= Telecommunications in Thailand =

Modern telecommunications in Thailand began in 1875 with the deployment of the first telegraph service. Historically, the development of telecommunication networks in Thailand were in the hands of the public sector. Government organisations were established to provide telegraph, telephone, radio, and television services, and other government agencies, especially the military, still control a large estate of radio and television spectra. Private telecommunication operators initially acquired concession agreements with state enterprises. For mobile phone services, all the concessions have been amended by successive government to last 25 years have gradually ended in 2015. For other services, the concession terms and conditions vary, ranging from one to fifteen years. Nearly all of the concessions are build-operate-transfer (BOT) contracts. The private investor has to build all the required facilities and transfer them to the state before they can operate or offer services to public.

Liberalisation took place in the 1990s and 2000s. State enterprises, the Telephone Organization of Thailand, Communications Authority of Thailand, and Mass Communication Organization of Thailand, were corporatised in 2003 and 2004. The Constitution of 1997 prompted the institutional changes when it declared that all the spectrum is a "national communication resource for public welfare". The 1997 Constitution further requires the establishment of "an independent regulator" who shall be authorized to allocate spectra and monitor and regulate communications in Thailand. In 1998, to comply with the constitutional mandate, the parliament passed a law establishing two independent regulators, the National Telecommunication Commission (NTC) and the National Broadcasting Commission (NBC). The regulatory practice began in Thailand when the NTC was appointed by the king through the complex nomination procedure in 2005. The inception of NTC automatically terminates and transfers all power and authority in telecommunication sector from the Post and Telegraph Department (PTD) to the newly established independent commission.

In September 2006, the military wrested control from a civilian government and merged the telecommunications and broadcasting regulators into a convergence regulator. The task had not been completed when a civilian government came into power and introduced the new bill. The new law dubbed the Act on Spectrum Allocation Authority, Regulatory & Control over Radio & TV Broadcast and Telecommunications of 2010 (aka NRA Act of 2010), eliminated the NTC and created a new "convergence regulator" to manage both telecommunications and broadcast in Thailand. The new law also requires that the National Broadcasting and Telecommunications Commission which was established in 2010 as an independent regulator, must allocate all commercial spectrum licenses via auction. In 2012, in order to license the 3G spectrum and services, the Telecom Commission (TC) hosted a spectrum auction which resulted in three new licenses for 2.1 GHz to three incumbents (AIS, True, and DTAC). In 2013, the Broadcast Commission (BC) auctioned 42 new DTTV licenses. Both auctions together earned record sums for money paid to the public sector via auction. Later the record was beaten by another auction by sister agency, the Broadcast Commission who launched the DTTV auction in December 2013. The NBTC Act in force then allowed NBTC to keep the proceeds of the DTTV auction. But when the military took over the country, it amended the NBTC Act to require return of auction proceeds to the treasury.

On 22 May 2014 when the coup d'état took place, the military decided that it would scrutinize the regulatory practices of both sectors. The government, led by General Prayut Chan-o-cha, announced that his government would move Thailand into the "digital economy" and would transform the Ministry of Information and Telecommunications into a Digital Economy Ministry. NBTC reform would be a part of the plan. In June 2014, the junta issued two new orders demanding that a) all the proceeds from spectrum auctions must be returned to the public purse and, b) all community radio stations must comply with a new junta order which would require examination and investigation of compliance before offering programming to the public. Temporary licenses were issued in September 2014 to compliant radio stations that signed voluntary memoranda of understanding (MOU) as "a condition precedent" to be able to broadcast while awaiting more thorough vetting from BC before issuance of the de juré license. The time required to an investigation was ambiguous. New community radio licenses must be in compliance with a junta order that supersedes the Radio and Television Act of 2008.

The mobile network market is dominated by three large operators who have a market penetration rate of 100 percent. All main mobile operators now utilise GSM/3GPP family technologies including GSM, EDGE, UMTS, and LTE. Thailand has six analogue terrestrial television channels, and 24 commercial digital terrestrial channels began broadcasting in 2014.

Under the Trade Competition Act 2017, which became effective in October 2017, the trade competition authority relinquished its authority to regulate specific sectors including broadcasting and telecommunications businesses. In other words, since the Trade Competition Act 2017 became effective, the broadcasting and telecom sectors that used to be regulated by specific legislation on trade competition have been exempted from complying with general competition laws and are only subject to sectoral regulations on competition. However, although the Trade Competition Act (“TCA”) BE 2560 (2017), states that the TCA does not apply to sectors that have specific legislation (i.e.: Banking, Broadcasting and Telecom), the Telecommunications Business Act (“TBA”) B.E. 2544 (2001) – Section 21 states: “In the telecommunications business operation, other than being subject to the law on trade competition…”. Therefore, a merger in the telecom sector for example, would be under both acts and authorities, because the specific legislation (The Telecommunications Business Act) points back to the law on trade competition.

== Telephone ==
=== Fixed-line ===
There are three fixed-line telephone operators in Thailand: state-owned TOT Public Company Limited (now known as National Telecom (NT)), True Corporation, and TT&T (Currently name "3BB"). As of 2014, there were 5,687,038 fixed-line subscriptions. That number has been in decline since 2008.

The first fixed-line telephone system was installed in Thailand (Siam) under the Ministry of Defence in 1881, and later its operation was transferred to the Post and Telegraph Department. The Telephone Organization of Thailand (TOT) was established in 1954 to manage the telephone system.

The penetration of telephone remained relatively limited for most of the 20th century. In 1992, the ratio of telephone lines per population was 3.3 lines per 100 population. In 1991, two private corporations were given concessions to build and operate telephone lines: Telecom-Asia (later renamed True Corporation) for the Bangkok Metropolitan Region and Thai Telephone & Telecommunications (TT&T) for the provinces.

=== Mobile networks ===
As of 2014, there were 97.6 million mobile subscribers in Thailand, a penetration rate of 146 percent of the total population. The Thai market is predominantly prepaid with 84.8 million prepaid subscribers. More than 99 percent of the market share belongs to three large operators (including their subsidiaries): Advanced Info Service (AIS), 46.52 percent market share, DTAC, 28.50 percent market share, and Truemove, 24.26 percent. Other operators include the state enterprises TOT Public Company Limited (TOT) with 0.57 percent market share, and CAT Telecom with 0.15 percent market share and Mobile Virtual Network Operators (MVNOs).

In 1980s and 1990s, private mobile operators were given concessions from TOT and CAT. TOT and CAT were corporatised in 2002–2003, and the Thai telecommunications landscape transitioned towards spectrum allocation by independent regulator. The 2007 constitution and the Act on Organization to Assign Radio Frequency and to Regulate the Broadcasting and Telecommunications Services include the provisions that a national independent regulator is established and frequencies for commercial activities must be allocated via auction. The first successful spectrum auction by the National Broadcasting and Telecommunications Commission was organised in 2012, allocating 45 MHz of IMT (2100) frequency band to three mobile phone operators.

Legislation that governs the Mobile networks includes the Act on the Organisation to Assign Radio Frequency and to Regulate Broadcasting and Telecommunications Services 2010 (the NBTC Act) and the Telecommunications Business Act 2001 (the Telecommunications Business Act). Additionally, any operator wishing to issue telephone numbers shall obtain a separate licence from the NBTC, subject to a Telecommunications Numbering Plan issued by the NBTC.

In 2015 the NBTC arranged two rounds of auctions for 1800 MHz and 900Mhz. In November, Advance Info Service and True Corporation won the 1800 MHz license in the auction which takes nearly 33 hours to complete. In December, True Corporation and Jasmine International won the 900 MHz auction. The significance of this auction is the establishment of Jasmine International in the telecommunication business which didn't have a new player for many years. There are many rumours following this auction questioning Jasmine International on its ability to pay the license fee to NBTC.

In 2017, the number of mobile subscribers has reached 121.53 million, and in 2018 has already reached 125.6 million. To purchase a SIM card in Thailand, it is necessary to present an ID to register.

At the end of 2021, the total number of mobile subscriptions in Thailand was 99.4 million, representing a mobile penetration rate of 150 percent of the total population. More than 96.5 percent of the total market share belongs to three large operators (including their subsidiaries): Advanced Info Service (AIS), 44.38 percent market share, Truemove, 32.44 percent and DTAC, 19.68 percent market share. Other operators include the state enterprises National Telecom (NT) with 3.45 percent market share, and mobile virtual network operators (MVNO) with 0.05 percent market share, resulting in a (HHI) of 3,421

On November 22, 2021, Telenor and Charoen Pokphand Group, officially announced they have agreed to explore a USD 8.6 billion merger plan between Thailand’s second and third largest telecom operators (by subscribers), True Corporation (TRUE) and Total Access Communication (DTAC) – The proposed merger is subject to regulatory approvals. The merger was "acknowledged" by the regulator NBTC at a meeting on October 20, 2022. The newly merged company still retain the True Corporation name, which was founded on March 1, 2023 and it was listed on the Stock Exchange of Thailand under the stock ticker symbol TRUE on March 3, 2023.

=== Mobile Network Operators ===
#	Operator	Technology	Subscribers	Ownership
1	AIS	GSM-900, 900/1800/2100 MHz LTE-A (4G), 700 MHz (Band 28/n28), 2600 MHz (Band 41/n41), 26 GHz (n258) 5G	45.7 million (Q1 2025)	INTOUCH Company (40.45%); Singtel (23.32%)
2	True Corporation	GSM-900/1800, 850/2100 MHz UMTS HSPA, HSPA+, DC-HSPA+, 900/1800/2100 MHz LTE-A (4G), 700 MHz (Band 28/n28), 2300 MHz (Band 40/n40), 2600 MHz (Band 41/n41), 26 GHz (n258), 1500 MHz (Band 32/n32) 5G	48.8 million (Q1 2025)	Charoen Pokphand Group (approx. 30%); Telenor (approx. 30%); China Mobile; Others
3	National Telecom (NT)	700 MHz n28 26 GHz n258	3,425,730 (2021); 700,000 (2024)	Ministry of Digital Economy and Society

=== Mobile Network Operator Sub-brands ===
#	Brand	Operator	Subscribers	Ownership
1	GoMo	AIS		INTOUCH Company (40.45%); Singtel (23.32%)
2	Finn Mobile (formerly Line Mobile)	True Corporation		Charoen Pokphand Group (approx. 30%); Telenor (approx. 30%); China Mobile; Others

=== Mobile Virtual Network Operator (MVNO) ===
#	MVNO	Technology	Subscribers	Ownership
1	IEC3G Buzzme (Host operator TOT)	3G : UMTS/WCDMA : B1 2100 MHz	End of Service 2018	Mobile 8 Telco Sdn Bhd.
2	MyWorld 3G (Host operator CAT)	3G : UMTS/WCDMA : B5 850 MHz	End of Service	Data CDMA Communication Co., Ltd.
3	OPEN SIM i-mobile (Host operator CAT)	3G : UMTS/WCDMA : B5 850 MHz	End of Service 2017	Samart Corporation Public Company Limited.
4	imobile-3GX (Host operator CAT)	3G : UMTS/WCDMA : B5 850 MHz	End of Service 2017	Samart Corporation Public Company Limited.
5	168 (Host operator CAT)	3G : UMTS/WCDMA : B5 850 MHz	End of Service 2018	168 Communication Co Ltd.
6	Mojo 3G (Host operator TOT)	3G : UMTS/WCDMA : B1 2100 MHz	End of Service 2017	MConzult Asia Co., Ltd.
7	Tune Talk (Host operator TOT)	3G : UMTS/WCDMA : B1 2100 MHz	End of Service	Loxley Public Company Limited (50%); Tune Group Sdn Bhd (10%); Thai AirAsia Co., Ltd. (40%)
8	i-Kool 3G (Host operator TOT)	3G : UMTS/WCDMA : B1 2100 MHz	End of Service 2025	Loxley Public Company Limited.
9	Penguin SIM (Host operator CAT & TOT)	3G : UMTS/WCDMA : B1 2100 MHz / B5 850 MHz	End of Service 2022	The WhiteSpace Co.Ltd.
10	K4 SIM (Host operator TOT)	3G : UMTS/WCDMA : B1 2100 MHz; 4G : LTE-FDD : B1 2100 MHz; 4.5G : TDD LTE : B40 2300 MHz	End of Service 2025 (License revoked)	K4 Communication Co., Ltd.
11	Feels (Host operator TOT)	3G : UMTS/WCDMA : B1 2100 MHz; 4G : LTE-FDD : B1 2100 MHz; 4.5G : TDD LTE : B40 2300 MHz	End of Service 2025	Feels Telecom Corporation Co., Ltd.
12	Infinite SIM (AJ SIM) (Host operator TOT)	3G : UMTS/WCDMA : B1 2100 MHz; 4G : LTE-FDD : B1 2100 MHz; 4.5G : TDD LTE : B40 2300 MHz	End of Service 2025	Bangkok Telling Co., Ltd.
13	Redone (Host operator TOT)	3G : UMTS/WCDMA : B1 2100 MHz; 4G : LTE-FDD : B1 2100 MHz; 4.5G : TDD LTE : B40 2300 MHz	End of Service 2025	Red One Network (Thailand) Co., Ltd

As of July 2025, Thailand's Mobile Virtual Network Operator (MVNO) sector has effectively ceased operations, with all MVNOs having ceased their service. This outcome is attributed to the National Broadcasting and Telecommunications Commission (NBTC)'s spectrum auctions and the persistent lack of wholesale network access from the dominant Mobile Network Operators (MNOs), AIS and the merged TRUE/DTAC.

The situation was exacerbated by the NBTC's 2025 spectrum auction. National Telecom (NT), which served as the only host for MVNOs, saw its allocated spectrum significantly reduced as its right to use the 850MHz, 2100MHz, and 2300MHz bands expired in August 2025. This development directly led to the termination of services for MVNOs that relied on NT's infrastructure.

Despite a regulatory mandate requiring MNOs to allocate at least 10% of their network capacity for MVNAs/MVNOs since 2013, critics allege that the NBTC has neglected its duty and has not enforced this provision, thereby preventing MVNOs from securing fair and reasonable wholesale agreements with AIS and TRUE/DTAC.

Consequently, all remaining MVNOs, including Feels Telecom (Feels Telecom), Infinite SIM (Infinite SIM), Penguin SIM (Whitespace) (The Whitespace), and i-Kool (Loxley) (i-Kool), officially announced the termination of their services, citing the expiration of contracts with NT and the inability to establish viable alternative agreements with other MNOs.

Critics contend that the NBTC's regulatory approach has inadvertently fostered a duopoly, severely limiting competition and consumer choice in the Thai mobile market. The Thailand Consumer Council has also raised concerns, questioning the impact of the spectrum auction on MVNOs and advocating for stronger regulatory oversight.

=== Mobile Virtual Network Aggregator (MVNA) / Mobile Virtual Network Enabler (MVNE) ===
The National Broadcasting and Telecommunications Commission (NBTC), has awarded a Type 1 Mobile Virtual Network Aggregator (MVNA) license to the MVNA and Mobile virtual network enabler (MVNE) company MVNO.SERVICE Co., Ltd.

=== Numbering ===
Fixed-line telephone numbers have nine digits, while mobile numbers have ten digits, both including the trunk prefix "0".

== Radio ==
- AM: 204
- FM: 334, shortwave 6 (1999)

There are 13.96 million radios in use (1997). But there were some cases like in 2015, expecting there will be more than 25 million radios are in use as of now.

== Television ==
Before the transition to digital terrestrial television, there were six free-to-air analogue terrestrial television stations in Thailand:

- Channel 3, operated by BEC World under concession from MCOT
- Channel 5, operated by the Royal Thai Army
- Channel 7, operated by BBTV, under concession from the Army
- Channel 9 MCOT HD, operated by the corporatised state-owned enterprise MCOT
- NBT, operated by the Thai government (Via The Government Public Relations Department, Office of the Prime Minister of Thailand)
- Thai PBS, a statutory public service broadcaster

The transition to digital terrestrial television began in 2014. The National Broadcasting and Telecommunications Commission arranged an auction for commercial television licenses in December 2013. The spectrum are allocated to four groups of commercial television services: seven high-definition general licenses, seven standard-definition general licenses, seven news station licenses, and four children-and-family licenses. In addition, spectrum are allocated for 12 national public services channels and 12 regional community channels. The commercial licensees began experimental broadcasts on 1 April 2014.

== Submarine cables ==
There are five submarine cables used for communications landing in Thailand. Thailand has cable landing points in Satun, Petchaburi and Chonburi.

- SEA-ME-WE-3, SEA-ME-WE-4 linking South East Asia to the Middle East and Western Europe. SEA-ME-WE 4 was operational since 2006.
- Thailand-Indonesia-Singapore (TIS) operational since December 2003.
- APCN linking Thailand, Malaysia, Singapore, Indonesia, Hong Kong, Philippines, Taiwan, Korea and Japan. The cable is operational since 1996.
- Thailand-Vietnam-Hong Kong (T-V-H) operational since February 1996.
- Flag Europe-Asia (FEA) operational since mid-1990s.

The Asia-America Gateway (AAG) is under construction and is in service since November 2009.

The Asia Pacific Gateway (APG), a new submarine cable, is under planning stage and is expected to be operational in Q3 2014.

== Satellite ==
Thaicom is the name of a series of communications satellites operated out of Thailand and the name Thaicom Public Company Limited, which is the company that owns and operates the Thaicom satellite fleet and other telecommunication businesses in Thailand and throughout the Asia-Pacific.

The official name of satellite project known as THAICOM named by His Majesty the King Bhumibol Adulyadej, as a symbol of the linkage between Thailand and modern communications technology.

Thailand-based Shinawatra Computer and Communications Co. Ltd. (now InTouch Group) signed a US$100 million contract with Hughes Space and Communications Company Ltd. in 1991 to launch Thailand's first satellite communications project. The first Thaicom satellite was launched on December 17, 1993. This satellite carried 12 C-band transponders covering a region from Japan to Singapore. Thaksin Shinawatra sold Shin Corporation, which owns 41% of Thaicom Public Company Limited.

== Telecommunications regulatory environment in Thailand ==
National Broadcasting and Telecommunications Commission (NBTC)

The NRA Organization Act of 2010 established the new National Broadcasting and Telecommunications Commission (NBTC) in December 2010 as a single converged regulator for the telecoms and broadcasting sectors in Thailand.

The Telecommunications Business Act of 2001 laid down the rules for Thailand's telecommunications industry by requiring telecoms operators to obtain a license from the National Broadcasting and Telecommunications Commission (NBTC). The Act classifies telecommunication licenses into three categories.

- Type-one telecom license is for an operator without its own network.
- Type-two telecom license is for an operator with or without its own network but provides services targeting a segment or even several segments of the public.
- Type-three telecom license is for an operator with a network that provides services to the general public.

The 2001 Act was amended in 2006 under the supervision of Prime Minister Thaksin Shinawatra to allow foreigners to own a larger holding in a Thai telecommunications business.

In 2001, foreigners were not permitted to apply for type-two or type-three licenses under Thailand's Foreign Business Act (FBA).

The applicant applying for type two and type three licenses must be organizations where Thai nationals hold at least 75% shares and at least three quarters of the applicant's firm directors and the person authorized to sign any binding commitments as a representation of the applicant firm must be Thai nationals.

The 2006 amendments repealed all the additional requirements of an applicant of type-two and type-three licenses, stating foreigners can now hold up to 49% in a telecommunications operator of type-two or type-three; no restrictions on the number of their foreign directors’ representation; and the authorized person signing binding commitments as a representation of the applicant firm can be a foreigner.

The telecoms license fee is composed of three types of fees - permission for license, renewal and an annual fee.

As of June 2013 the NBTC has granted 186 telecoms licensees, listed as follows:

- 144 type-one licensees
- 7 type-two licenses without own network
- 10 type-two licenses with own network
- 25 type-three licenses

As of December 2018 the National Broadcasting and Telecommunications Commission (NBTC) had issued 58 MVNO licenses, however only 9 had launched.

== See also ==
- Media of Thailand
- Censorship in Thailand
