= List of mobile network operators in Asia and Oceania =

This is a list of all mobile phone carriers in the Asia Pacific Region and their respective number of subscribers.

== Afghanistan ==
The country's telecom regulator is the Afghanistan Telecommunications Regulatory Authority (ATRA).

Rank	Operator	Technology	Subscribers (in millions)	Ownership
1	ATOMA (formerly MTN Afghanistan)	GSM-900/1800 MHz (GPRS, EDGE); 2100 MHz UMTS, HSDPA	6.2 (Q4 2020)	M1 Group
2	Roshan	GSM-900 MHz (GPRS, EDGE); 2100 MHz UMTS, HSPA+	5.4 (Q4 2020)	Aga Khan Fund for Economic Development (AKFED)
3	Etisalat Afghanistan	GSM-900/1800 MHz (GPRS, EDGE); 2100 MHz UMTS (3G), HSPA+ (3.75G), LTE (Under Trial)	5.4 (Q4 2020)	Emirates Telecommunications Corporation
4	Afghan Wireless	GSM-900/1800 MHz (GPRS, EDGE); 2100 MHz UMTS, HSPA+, LTE	3.7 (Q4 2020)	Telephone Systems International
5	Salaam	GSM-900/1800 MHz (GPRS, EDGE); 2100 MHz UMTS, HSPA+	2.0 (Q4 2020)	

== American Samoa ==
As of 2004, American Samoa has 32,000 subscribers in total, or an 85% penetration rate.

Rank	Operator	Technology	Subscribers (in millions)	Ownership
1	Blue Sky Communications	850 MHz GSM; 850 MHz UMTS, HSPA+ LTE	0.0320 (2012)	Amper SpA
2	American Samoa Telecommunications Authority (ASTCA)	800 MHz CDMA2000/Evolution-Data OptimizedRev.A LTE		Government of American Samoa

== Australia ==
The country's telecom regulator is the Australian Communications and Media Authority (ACMA). Australia is covered by three mobile network operators and multiple Mobile Virtual Network Operators which use network infrastructure of the three mobile network operators.

Rank	Operator	Technology	Subscribers (in millions)	Ownership
1	Telstra	700/850/1800/2100/2600 MHz LTE, LTE-A, VoLTE; 850/2600/3500 MHz, 26 GHz 5G NR, VoNR	20.7 (August 2024)	Telstra
2	Optus	700/1800/2100/2300/2600 MHz LTE-A, VoLTE; 700/900/2100/2300/2600/3500 MHz, 26 GHz 5G NR	10.50 (June 2024)	Singtel
3	Vodafone AU	700/850/1800/2100 MHz LTE-A, VoLTE; 700/850/1800/2100/3500 MHz, 26 GHz 5G NR	5.40 (February 2025)	TPG Telecom

== Bangladesh ==
The total number of Mobile Phone subscriptions in Bangladesh has reached 188.60 million at the end of May 2026.

Rank	Operator	Technology	Subscribers (in millions)	Ownership
1	Grameenphone-with Digital Sub Brand -Skitto	2G: GSM-900 /1800 MHz (GPRS, EDGE); 3G: 2100 MHz UMTS, HSPA, HSPA+, DC-HSPA+ (Available on selected area); 4G:700(B28)/900(B8)/1800(B3)/2100(B1)/2600(B41) MHz TD-LTE, FDD-LTE, LTE-A Pro Up to 5xCA B1+B3+B8+B41; 5G: 2600(N41) MHz NSA; 4G Calling (VoLTE) : Supported; Wi-Fi Calling : VoWiFi Available; FWD: Wireless Brodband - WiFi; eSIM : Available; RCS (Currently unavilable)	85.90	Telenor (55.8%); Grameen Telecom (34.2%); General Public & other Institutions (10%)
2	Robi with Digital Sub Brand - Cirkle	2G : GSM-900 /1800 MHz (GPRS, EDGE); 3G: Shutdown completed by Year-2024; 4G :900(B8)/1800 (B3) / 2100(B1) / 2600(B41) MHz TD-LTE, FDD-LTE, LTE-A Pro Up to 5xCA B1+B3+B8+B41; 5G: 2600(N41) MHz NSA; 4G Calling (VoLTE) : Supported; Wi-Fi Calling : VoWiFi On Trial; FWD: Wireless Brodband - WiFi; eSIM : Available; RCS (Currently unavilable)	58.18	Axiata Group Berhad (61.82%); Bharti Airtel (28.18%); General public (10%)
3	Banglalink with Digital Sub Brand - RYZE	2G : GSM-900 /1800 MHz (GPRS, EDGE); 3G: Shutdown commenced on May 5, 2024; 4G :900(B8)/1800(B3)/2100(B1)/2300(B40) MHz TD-LTE, FDD-LTE, LTE-A Pro Up to 4xCA B1+B3+B8+B40; 4G Calling (VoLTE) : On Trial by User Request; Wi-Fi Calling : VoWiFi Available; 5G: on Trial; FWD: Wireless Brodband - WiFi; eSIM : Available; RCS (Currently unavilable)	37.71	veon
4	Teletalk	2G : GSM-900/1800 MHz (GPRS, EDGE); 3G : 2100 MHz UMTS, HSPA, HSPA+, DC-HSPA+; 4G :700(b28)/1800(B3)/2100(B1) /2300(B40) MHz TD-LTE, FDD-LTE, LTE-A Pro Up to 2xCA; 5G – 3500 MHz (n78) on trial; 4G Calling (VoLTE) : Not Supported; Wi-Fi Calling : Not Supported; FWD : Not Supported; eSIM : Available; RCS (Currently unavilable)	6.81	State-owned

== Bhutan ==
Rank	Operator	Technology	Subscribers (in millions)	Ownership
1	B-Mobile	GSM-900/1800 MHz (GPRS, EDGE); 850 MHz UMTS, HSPA+ 1800 MHz LTE	0.464(June 2021)	Bhutan Telecom Limited (BTL)
2	TashiCell	GSM-900/1800 MHz (GPRS, EDGE); 850/2100 MHz UMTS, HSPA+ 700 MHz LTE	0.275(June 2021)	Tashi Group

== Bougainville ==
Rank	Operator	Technology	Subscribers (in millions)	Ownership
1	PNG dataco	GSM-900 (GPRS, EDGE); 900 MHz UMTS, HSDPA; 700 MHz LTE	Not Yet Available	PNG DataCo Limited is a state owned entity, created in 2014 to provide wholesale services to the Information and Communication Industry, mandated to build, own and operate the National Transmission Network (NTN).

== Brunei ==
As of December 2014, the penetration rate in Brunei was 114%, over a population estimate of over 400,000.

Rank	Operator	Technology	Subscribers (in millions)	Ownership
1	Datastream Digital (DST) (formerly DataStream Technology)	GSM-900 MHz (GPRS, EDGE); 2100 MHz UMTS, HSDPA, HSPA, HSPA+ 1800 MHz LTE	0.32	Unified National Networks (UNN)
2	Progresif (formerly B-mobile)	2100 MHz UMTS, HSDPA, HSPA, HSPA+	0.15	Imagine Brunei

== Cambodia ==
As of June 2013, the penetration rate in Cambodia was estimated at 69.318% over a population estimate of over 14.7 million.

Rank	Operator	Technology	Subscribers (in millions)	Ownership
1	Metfone	GSM-900/1800 MHz (GPRS); UMTS, HSDPA LTE	9 (2015)	Viettel Cambodia
2	Smart	GSM-900/1800 MHz (GPRS, EDGE); 2100 MHz UMTS, HSPA+ 1800 MHz LTE	8 {{}}	Axiata Group Berhad
3	Cellcard	GSM-900 MHz; 2100 MHz UMTS LTE	2.5 (2010)	The Royal Group

== China (mainland) ==
Mainland China's telecom regulator is the Ministry of Industry and Information Technology.

Rank	Operator	Technology	Subscribers (in millions)	Ownership
1	China Mobile (中国移动)	5G NR: Bands n28, n41, n79 TD-LTE: Bands 34, 39, 40, 41; LTE-FDD: Bands 3, 8 LTE-A, NB-IoT, VoLTE, VoNR	1,008.93 (Q1 2026)	State-owned (SASAC); Public-traded
2	China Telecom (中国电信)	5G NR: Bands n1, n5, n78 LTE-FDD: Bands 1, 3, 5 LTE-A, NB-IoT, VoLTE, VoNR	440.55 (Q1 2026)	State-owned (SASAC); Public-traded
3	China Unicom (中国联通)	5G NR: Bands n1, n8, n78 LTE-FDD: Bands 1, 3, 8 LTE-A, NB-IoT, VoLTE, VoNR	242.00 (Q1 2026)	State-owned (SASAC); Public-traded
4	China Broadnet (中国广电)	5G NR MOCN with China Mobile	~43 (Q1 2026)	State-owned (NRTA)

== Cook Islands ==
As of 2019, Cook Islands has 6,000 subscribers in total.

Rank	Operator	Technology	Subscribers (in millions)	Ownership
1	Vodafone (formerly Bluesky)	900 MHz GSM; UMTS; LTE	Not Yet Available	Telecom Cook Islands LTD

== Fiji ==
As of March 2011, the penetration rate in Fiji was estimated at 79.957% over a population estimate of around 0.9 million.

Rank	Operator	Technology	Subscribers (in millions)	Ownership
1	Vodafone	900 MHz GSM, GPRS, EDGE; 2100 MHz UMTS, HSDPA; 1800 MHz LTE	0.730 (2017)	Amalgamated Telecom Holdings, 72.6% owned by the Fiji National Provident Fund (51%) Fiji National Provident Fund (49%)
2	Telstra	900 MHz GSM, GPRS, EDGE; 900 MHz UMTS, HSPA+ 800/1800 MHz LTE	Not Yet Available	Telstra

== French Polynesia ==
As of March 2011, the penetration rate in French Polynesia was estimated at 98.7% over a population estimate of around 268.000.

Rank	Operator	Technology	Subscribers (in millions)	Ownership
1	VINI	900 MHz GPRS, EDGE; 2100 MHz UMTS, HSDPA 800/2600 MHz LTE	0.112 (2023)	ONATi
2	Vodafone	900 MHz EDGE; 900/2100 MHz HSDPA; 700/800/1800/2100/2600 MHz LTE-A 3.5 GHz (n78) 5G NR 5G-NSA	0.114	Pacific Mobile Telecom
3	VITI	WiMAX 800/2600 MHz LTE	Not Yet Available	

== Guam ==
As of 2012, Guam has 185,000 subscribers in total.

Rank	Operator	Technology	Subscribers (in millions)	Ownership
1	IT&E	1900 MHz UMTS, DC-HSPA+ 700/1900 MHz LTE Advanced n41 5G-NR ENDC	Not Yet Available	PTI Pacifica Inc.
2	Docomo Pacific	CdmaOne; GSM-1900 MHz (GPRS); 850 MHz UMTS; 700 MHz LTE	Not Yet Available	NTT Docomo
3	GTA	GSM-850/1900 MHz (GPRS); 850 MHz UMTS, HSPA+ 1700 MHz LTE	Not Yet Available	TeleGuam Holdings LLC

== Hong Kong ==
As of March 2025, the penetration rate in Hong Kong was estimated at 359% over a population estimate of over 7.501 million, with 27.81 million public mobile subscriptions. Hong Kong's telecom regulator is the Office of the Communications Authority (OFCA).

As of March 2024, there were 24 registered Mobile Virtual Network Operators, apart from the 4 licensed mobile network operators in Hong Kong.

Rank	Operator	Technology	Subscribers (in millions)	Ownership
1	CMHK	900(B8)/1800(B3)/2100(B1)/2600(B7)/2300(B40) MHz LTE-A; 2.1 GHz(n1)/3.5 GHz(n78)/4.7 GHz(n79) 5G NR	>5	China Mobile
2	csl	900/2100 MHz UMTS, HSPA+, DC-HSPA+ 900(B8)/1800(B3)/2600(B7) MHz LTE-A; 2.1 GHz(n1)/3.5 GHz(n78)/4.7 GHz(n79) 5G NR	4.764 (Dec 2023)	Hong Kong Telecom
3	3	900 MHz UMTS, HSPA+, DC-HSPA+ 900(B8)/1800(B3)/2100(B1)/2600(B7)/2300(B40) MHz LTE-A; 700 MHz(n28)/2.1 GHz(n1)/3.5 GHz(n78) 5G NR	4.3 (June 2024)	Hutchison Telecom
4	SmarTone	900(B8)/1800(B3)/2100(B1)/2600(B7) MHz LTE-A; 2.1 GHz(n1)/3.5 GHz(n78) 5G NR	2.65 (Dec 2023)	Sun Hung Kai Properties

== India ==
Rank	Operator	Technology	Subscribers (in millions)	Ownership
1	Jio	850(B5)/1800(B3)/2300(B40) LTE, TD-LTE, FD-LTE, LTE-A; 700(n28)/800(n5)/1800(n3)/3300(n78)/3500(n77)/26 GHz(n258) mmWave, 5G NR; VoLTE, ViLTE, VoWiFi; WiFi; eSIM : Available	472.42	Jio Platforms
2	Airtel	GSM – 900/1800 MHz (EDGE), GPRS; 900(B8)/1800(B3)/2100(B1)/2300(B40) LTE, TD-LTE, FD-LTE, LTE-A; 900(n8)/1800(n3)/2100(n1)/3300(n78)/3500(n77)/26 GHz(n258) mmWave, 5G NR; VoLTE, ViLTE, VoWiFi; Wi-Fi; eSIM : Available	386.52	Bharti Airtel
3	Vi	GSM – 900/1800 MHz (EDGE), GPRS; 900(B8)/1800(B3)/2100(B1)/2300(B40)/2500(B41) LTE, TD-LTE, FD-LTE, LTE-A; 1800(n3)/2100(n1)/2500(n41)/3300(n78)/3500(n77)/26 GHz(n258) mmWave, 5G NR; VoLTE, ViLTE, VoWiFi; Wi-Fi; eSIM : Available only Postpaid	219.08	Government Of India (49%); Vodafone Group Plc (16%); Aditya Birla Group (9.6%); Free Float (25.4%)
4	BSNL	GSM – 900/1800 MHz (EDGE), GPRS; 700(n28)/850(B5)/2100(B1)/2500(B41) LTE, TD-LTE, FD-LTE, LTE-A; VoLTE; WiMAX, Wi-Fi; eSIM : Available in Tamil Nadu	87.02	Government of India
5	MTNL (Areas: Mumbai, Delhi)	GSM – 900/1800/2100 (EDGE), GPRS, UMTS	1.92	Government of India; Subsidiary of Bharat Sanchar Nigam Limited

== Indonesia ==
Indonesia has 254.792 million subscribers in total (April 2018), or a 142% penetration rate (January 2017). The regulatory authority for telecommunication in Indonesia is the Ministry of Communication and Digital Affairs, having taking over the roles from the Badan Regulasi Telekomunikasi Indonesia (Indonesia Telecommunication Regulatory Agency), which was dissolved in November 2021.

Rank	Operator	Technology	Subscribers (in millions)	Ownership	MCC/MNC
1	Telkomsel (Include by.U and previous TelkomFlexi network)	2G : GSM-900/1800 MHz (GPRS, EDGE); 4G : 900(B8)/1800(B3)/2100(B1) MHz FDD-LTE, 2300(B40) MHz TDD-LTE, LTE-A; 5G : 2100(n1) MHz FDD-NR, 2300(n40) MHz TDD-NR NSA • VoLTE: Available • eSIM: Available	153.7 (Q1 2026)	Telkom Indonesia (69.9%); Singtel (30.1%)	51010
2	Indosat Ooredoo Hutchison (Include previous Satelindo, Indosat-M3, 3 and StarOne network)	2G : GSM-900/1800 MHz (GPRS, EDGE); 4G : 900(B8)/1800(B3)/2100(B1) MHz FDD-LTE, LTE-A; 5G : 2100(n1) MHz FDD-NR, 2600(n41) MHz TDD-NR NSA • VoLTE: Available • eSIM: Available	94.0 (Q1 2026)	Ooredoo Hutchison Asia (65%); Government of Indonesia (9.6%)	51001, 51021 and 51089
3	XLSMART (Include previous XL, AXIS, Smartfren, Esia and Mobile-8 network)	2G : GSM-1800 MHz (GPRS, EDGE; excluding Smartfren) 4G : 700(B28)/850(B5)/1800(B3)/2100(B1) MHz FDD-LTE, 2300(B40) MHz TDD-LTE, LTE-A; 5G : 2300(n40)/2500(n41) MHz TDD-NR NSA • VoLTE: Available • eSIM: Available	69.4 (Q1 2026)	Axiata Investments Indonesia (34,8%); Sinar Mas (34,8%)	51009, 51011 and 51028

== Japan ==
As of May 2020, Japan has 182.15 million subscribers in total, or a 144.61% penetration rate.

Rank	Operator	Technology	Subscribers (in millions)	Ownership
1	NTT Docomo	4G : B1(2100)/B3(1800)/B19(850)/B21(1500)B28(700)Mhz LTE, TD-LTE, LTE-A; 5G : n77(3700)/n77(3700)/n79(4700)Mhz /n257(28)Ghz 5G NR	82.632 (Mar 2021)	NTT
2	au	4G : B1(2100)/B3(1800)/B11(1500)/B18(850)/B41(2500)Mhz LTE, TD-LTE 5G : n3 (1800)/n28 (700)/n78 (3500)/n77(3700)Mhz /n257(28)Ghz 5G NR	60.398 (Mar 2021)	KDDI
3	SoftBank Corp. & Ymobile	4G : B1(2100)/B3(1800)/B8(900)/B11(1500)MHz; LTE, TD-LTE 5G : n77(3700)/n78(3500)/n3(1800)/n28(700)Mhz/n257(28)Ghz 5G NR	45.621 (Mar 2021)	SoftBank Group (99.99%)
4	Rakuten Mobile	4G : B3(1800)Mhz LTE 5G : n3(1800)/n77(3700)Mhz/n257(28)Ghz 5G NR	7.0	Rakuten
Mobile Virtual Network Operators
1	Disney Mobile (using SoftBank Mobile)	UMTS, HSPA+, DC-HSDPA; TD-LTE	N/A	SoftBank / The Walt Disney Company
2	b-mobile (using NTT Docomo)	2100/800 MHz UMTS, HSPA; 800/1500/2100 MHz LTE	N/A	Japan Communications Inc.
3	IIJmio			Internet Initiative Japan

== Kazakhstan ==
As of September 2022, the penetration rate in Kazakhstan was estimated at 128.85% over a population estimate of around 19.635 million, with 25.3 million mobile subscriptions.

Rank	Operator	Technology	Subscribers (in millions)	Ownership	MCC/MNC
1	Beeline Kazakhstan (including izi and Forte Mobile)	900 MHz GSM (GPRS, EDGE); 900/2100 MHz UMTS, HSDPA, HSUPA, HSPA, HSPA+, DC-HSPA+ 800/1800/2100 MHz LTE, LTE-A, VoLTE	11.6 (Q4 2024)	VEON (75%), Verny Capital (25%)	40101
2	Kcell (including activ)	900 MHz GSM (GPRS, EDGE); 2100 MHz UMTS, HSDPA, HSUPA, HSPA, HSPA+, DC-HSPA+ 800/1800/2100 MHz LTE, LTE-A; 700/3500 MHz 5G NR	7.9 (Q4 2024)	Kazakhtelecom (51%), Others (49%)	40102
3	Tele2 Kazakhstan / Altel (including Altel)	900 MHz GSM (GPRS, EDGE); 900 MHz UMTS, HSDPA, HSUPA, HSPA, HSPA+, DC-HSPA+ (disabled in some regions); 1800/2100 MHz LTE, LTE-A, VoLTE; 700/3500 MHz 5G NR	N/A	Power International Holding (formerly owned by Tele2 AB until 2019)	40177

== Kyrgyzstan ==
As of 2008, Kyrgyzstan has 6.6 million subscribers in total, a 120% penetration rate.

Rank	Operator	Technology	Subscribers (in millions)	Ownership	MCC/MNC
1	MegaCom	GSM-900/1800 MHz (GPRS, EDGE); 2100 MHz UMTS, HSDPA, HSUPA, HSPA, HSPA+, DC-HSPA+ 800/1800/2100 MHz LTE	2.7 (2012)	JSC Alpha Telecom	43705
2	Beeline	GSM-900/1800 MHz (GPRS, EDGE); 2100 MHz UMTS, HSDPA, HSUPA, HSPA, HSPA+, DC-HSPA+	1.7 (Q4 2024)	Sky Mobile Ltd. (Eldik Bank, state-owned)	43701
3	Fonex	CDMA, HSDPA, HSUPA, HSPA, HSPA+, DC-HSPA+	0.42 (2008)	Aktel Ltd.	43703
4	O!	GSM-900/1800 MHz (GPRS, EDGE); 2100 MHz UMTS, HSDPA, HSUPA, HSPA, HSPA+, DC-HSPA+ 800/2600 MHz LTE	0.9	NUR Telecom Ltd.	43709
5	Katel	TDMA, HSDPA, HSUPA, HSPA, HSPA+, DC-HSPA+	0.1 (2008)	KATEL	
6	Nexi	CDMA, HSDPA, HSUPA, HSPA, HSPA+, DC-HSPA+	0.049 (2008)	SoTel	
7	Sapat Mobile	CDMA, HSDPA, HSUPA, HSPA, HSPA+, DC-HSPA+	0.011 (2008)	Winline Ltd.	
8	iTel				43711
9	Saima Telecom				43710

== Laos ==
As of 2012, Laos mobile penetration was 70.86% with 4.841 millions subscriptions.

Rank	Operator	Technology	Subscribers (in millions)	Ownership
1	Unitel	GSM-900/1800 MHz (GPRS, EDGE); 2100 MHz UMTS, HSDPA 1800 MHz LTE	2.705	Lao Asia Telecommunication State Enterprise (LAT) (51%), Viettel Global (49%)
2	Lao Telecom	GSM-900/1800 MHz (GPRS, EDGE); 2100 MHz UMTS, HSDPA (14.4 Mbit/s) 2600 MHz LTE	1.291	Government of Lao P.D.R. (51%), Shennington Investments (Thaicom) (49%)
3	TPLUS	GSM-900/1800 MHz (GPRS, EDGE); 2100 MHz UMTS, HSPA+ (21 Mbit/s); WiMAX	0.289	Government of Lao P.D.R. (100%)
4	ETL	GSM-900/1800 MHz (GPRS, EDGE); 2100 MHz UMTS, HSPA+ (21 Mbit/s)	0.439	Jiafu Holdings (51%); Government of Lao P.D.R. (49%)

== Macau ==
As of December 2016, Macau has about 1.969 million subscribers in total. Macau's telecom regulator is Direcção dos Serviços de Correios e Telecomunicações (DSRT).

3 Macau is the only carrier to offer VoWiFi. SmarTone MAC is the only carrier not yet to offer VoLTE, till its operation ceased.

Rank	Operator	Technology	Subscribers (in millions)	Ownership
1	CTM	900/1800/2100 MHz LTE-A; 700/2100/3500/4900 MHz 5G NR	0.663 (Q4 2023)	CITIC Telecom International (99%); Correios de Macau (1%)
2	China Telecom	850/1800/2100 MHz LTE; 700/2100/3500 MHz 5G NR	(Information not available)	Government of China
3	3 Macau	900/1800 MHz LTE-A	(Information not available)	CTM

== Malaysia ==
As of March 2014, the penetration rate in Malaysia was estimated at 144.2%.

The country's telecom regulator is the Malaysian Communications and Multimedia Commission.

Rank	Operator	Technology	Subscribers (in millions)	Ownership
1	CelcomDigi	2G: 900, 1800 MHz (EDGE) 4G: 900(B8), 1800(B3), 2100(B1), 2600(B7) MHz (LTE, LTE-A) • VoLTE, VoWiFi, eSIM 5G: Uses DNB 5G NSA	20.309 (Q2 2026)	Major shareholders: Axiata (33.1%); Telenor (33.1%); KWSP Malaysia (9%)
2	Maxis	2G: 900, 1800 MHz (EDGE) 4G: 900(B8), 1800(B3), 2100(B1), 2600(B7) MHz (LTE, LTE-A) • VoLTE, VoWiFi, eSIM 5G: Uses DNB 5G NSA	13.480 (Q3 2026)	Major shareholders: BGSM Equity (62%) (itself co-owned by Ananda Krishnan via Usaha Tegas (37%)); Harapan Nusantara (30%) ("a discretionary trust for bumiputra object(ives)"); Saudi Telecom Company (25%)
3	U Mobile	2G: Uses CelcomDigi 2G nationwide 4G: 900(B8),1800(B3),2100(B1),2600(B7)MHz (LTE-A) • VoLTE, VoWiFi, eSIM Malaysia's 2nd 5G Network: 5G: 700 MHz LTE, 5G NR; 3500 MHz(N77/78) 5G NR	9.0 (Dec 2024)	Major Shareholders: Mawar Setia Sdn. Bhd. (a unit majority owned by Vincent Tan) Ibrahim Ismail of Johor (22%); ST Telemedia (20%)
4	Yes	4G: 800(B20), 2300(B40), 2600(B38) MHz (LTE, LTE-A) • VoLTE, VoWiFi; 5G: Uses DNB 5G SA/NSA	2.8 (Dec 2024)	YTL Power
5	Unifi Mobile	2G: Uses Maxis 2G nationwide 4G: 850(B5), 2300(B40), 2600(B38) MHz (LTE, LTE-A) • VoLTE, VoWiFi • Uses maxis 4G on the area out of its own 4G network coverage 5G: Uses U Mobile 5G NSA	1.0 (Jun 2022)	Telekom Malaysia
6	Digital Nasional Berhad (DNB) (Malaysia 5G wholesale Network)	700 MHz LTE, 5G NR; 3500 MHz(N77/78) 5G NR	CelcomDigi; Maxis; Yes	Major Shareholders: (as April-2026) MOF (Malaysia) (31.18%); CelcomDigi (22.94%); Maxis (22.94%); Yes (22.94%)
-no nationwide deployment	Redtone	2300 MHz WiMAX (East Malaysia only)		Berjaya Corporation Berhad
Mobile Virtual Network Operators
1	XOX	(uses CelcomDigi)	2.5 (2023)	XOX Bhd.
2	redONE	(uses CelcomDigi)	1.2 (December 2024)	red ONE Network Sdn. Bhd. (unit by Berjaya Corporation)
3	Tune Talk	(uses CelcomDigi)	1.0	Gurtaj Singh (37.71%) CelcomDigi (35%)
4	HelloSIM	(uses CelcomDigi)	0.3 (3Q 2012)	Merchantrade Asia
5	Pavo Communications; *Operate in 2 brands: 1. SpeakOut; 2. mCalls	(uses CelcomDigi)		Pavo Communications Sdn. Bhd.
6	MY Evolution Sdn. Bhd.	(uses CelcomDigi)		M2M services in Asia
7	Telin Malaysia (Kartu As)	(uses U Mobile)		Telin Malaysia is a joint venture (JV) company between Compudyne Holdings Sdn. Bhd. and PT. Telin, a company fully owned by PT. Telekomunikasi Indonesia (Telkom).

== Maldives ==
As of March 2011, the penetration rate in Maldives was estimated at 116.456% over a population estimate of around 0.4 million.

Rank	Operator	Technology	Subscribers (in millions)	Ownership
1	Dhiraagu	GSM-900 (EDGE); 2100 MHz UMTS, HSPA+ LTE	0.350 (October 2012)	Dhiraagu
2	Ooredoo Maldives	GSM-900 (EDGE); 2100 MHz UMTS, DC-HSPA+ 1800 MHz LTE	0.272 (Q2 2014)	Ooredoo

== Marshall Islands ==
As of 2008, Marshall Islands has 1000 subscribers in total.

Rank	Operator	Technology	Subscribers (in millions)	Ownership
1	NTA	GSM-900 UMTS LTE	0.0007 (2008)	MINTA

== Federated States of Micronesia ==
As of 2008, Federated States of Micronesia has 34,000 subscribers in total.

Rank	Operator	Technology	Subscribers (in millions)	Ownership
1	FSM Telecom	GSM-900 UMTS	0.0274 (2008)	FSMTC

== Mongolia ==
As of Dec 2025, the penetration rate in Mongolia was estimated at 141% over a population estimate of around 3.5 million.[1]

Rank	Operator	Technology	Subscribers (in millions)	Ownership
1	Mobicom	GSM-900/1800 MHz (GPRS, EDGE); 2100 MHz UMTS, HSDPA, HSUPA, HSPA, HSPA+, DC-HSPA+ 700/1800 MHz LTE[2]	1.7[3] (June 2014)	KDDI, Sumitomo Corporation, Newcom Group
2	Unitel	GSM-900 MHz (GPRS, EDGE); 2100 MHz UMTS, HSDPA, HSUPA, HSPA, HSPA+, DC-HSPA+ 1800 MHz LTE	1.54[4] (June 2014)	MCS Group
3	Skytel	CdmaOne; 2100 MHz UMTS, HSDPA, HSUPA, HSPA, HSPA+, DC-HSPA+	0.6[4] (June 2014)	Altai Holdings, Shunkhlai Group
4	G-Mobile	CdmaOne; 2100 MHz UMTS, HSDPA, HSUPA, HSPA, HSPA+, DC-HSPA+	0.47[4] (June 2014)	
5	ONDO	LTE-800/2300 MHz; 5G-NR/N77 3800-3900MHz	0.35[5] (Dec 2025)	ONDO LLC

== Myanmar (Burma) ==
As of January 2019, the penetration rate in Myanmar was estimated at 105% over a population estimate of around 54 million.

Rank	Operator	Technology	Subscribers (in millions)	Ownership
1	MPT	450/800 MHz CDMA, CDMA2000 1x-EVDO; GSM-900 MHz (GPRS, EDGE); 2100 MHz UMTS, HSPA, HSPA+, DC-HSPA+ 1800/2100 MHz LTE, LTE-A VoLTE: Available (for international roaming only) eSIM: Available	22 (October 2018)	State-owned, KDDI, Sumitomo Corporation
2	ATOM (Formerly Telenor Myanmar)	GSM-900 MHz (GPRS, EDGE); 2100 MHz UMTS, HSPA, HSPA+ 1800/2100 MHz LTE, LTE-A VoLTE eSIM: Available	17.183 (October 2020)	M1 Group, Investcom Pte. Ltd.
3	Ooredoo	GSM-900 MHz (GPRS, EDGE); 2100 MHz UMTS, HSPA, HSPA+ 1800/2100 MHz LTE, LTE-A VoLTE eSIM: Available	14.839 (May 2020)	Nine Communications Pvt. Ltd.
4	Mytel	GSM-900 MHz (GPRS, EDGE); 1800/2100 MHz LTE, LTE-A VoLTE eSIM: Available	6 (June 2019)	Viettel (49%); Star High Telecom (28%); Myanmar National Telecom Holding (23%)

== Nauru ==
As of March 2011, the penetration rate in Nauru was estimated at 42.909% over a population estimate of around 9,000 people. The World Factbook shows 6,700 subscribers in 2011.

Rank	Operator	Technology	Subscribers (in millions)	Ownership
1	Telstra	GSM-900 UMTS LTE	0.007	Telstra

== Nepal ==
As of August 2017, the penetration rate in Nepal was estimated at 130.24% over a population estimate of around 26.5 million.

Rank	Operator	Technology	Subscribers (in millions)	Ownership
1	Nepal Telecom	900 MHz, 1800 MHz GSM, GPRS; 2100 MHz UMTS, HSDPA, 3G, 4G, HSPA+ 800 MHz & 1800 MHz; LTE-1800 MHz VoLTE, LTE-A	21.5684 (April 2023)	Nepal Doorsanchar Company Ltd.
2	Ncell	GSM-900/1800; 2100 MHz UMTS, 3G, 4G, HSDPA; LTE-1800 MHz	17.3068 (April 2023)	Spectrlite UK Limited (80%)
3	SmartCell	3G, 4G, GSM 900/1800; GPRS 900/2100; LTE-1800 MHz (Testing)	2.4121 (April 2023)	Smart Private Telcom Limited

== New Caledonia ==
Rank	Operator	Technology	Subscribers (in millions)	Ownership
1	Mobilis	900 MHz GSM; 2100 MHz UMTS; 800/1800/2600 MHz LTE	0.244 (2012)	Office des Postes et Télécommunications de Nouvelle-Calédonie

== New Zealand ==
As of March 2011, the penetration rate in New Zealand was estimated at 124.326% over a population estimate of around 4.3 million.

Rank	Operator	Technology	Subscribers (in millions)	Ownership
1	One NZ (formerly Vodafone NZ, BellSouth)	700/900/1800/2100/2600 MHz LTE, LTE-A 3500 MHz 5G eSIM : Available	2.538 (July 2019)	Infratil Limited
2	Spark (formerly Telecom)	850 MHz UMTS, HSPA, HSPA+, DC-HSPA+ 700/1800/2100/2300/2600 MHz LTE, LTE-A 850/2300/3500 MHz 5G eSIM : Available	2.46 (May 2019)	Public (NZX: SPK)
3	2degrees	900/2100 MHz UMTS, HSPA, HSPA+, DC-HSPA+ 700/900/1800/2100 MHz LTE, LTE-A 3500 MHz 5G eSIM : Available	1.41 (May 2019)	Voyage Australia Pty Limited
Mobile virtual network operators
?	Compass Mobile (using Spark)	UMTS, HSPA, LTE, 5G NR	?	Compass Communications
?	Kogan Mobile (using One NZ)	GSM, GPRS, UMTS, HSPA, LTE, 5G NR	?	Kogan.com (ASX: KGN)
?	Slingshot Mobile (using Spark)	UMTS, HSPA, LTE, 5G NR	?	Voyage Australia Pty Limited
?	Skinny (using Spark)	UMTS, HSPA, LTE, 5G NR	?	Spark (NZX: SPK)
?	Warehouse Mobile (using 2degrees)	UMTS, HSPA, LTE, 5G NR	?	The Warehouse Group (NZX: TWG)
	Rocket Mobile (using One NZ)	GSM, GPRS, UMTS, HSPA, LTE, 5G NR	?	My Republic
	Kiwi Mobile (using 2degrees)	UMTS, HSPA, LTE, 5G NR eSIM : Available	?	Electric Kiwi
	Contact Mobile (using One NZ)	GSM, GPRS, UMTS, HSPA, LTE, 5G NR eSIM : Available	?	Contact Energy
	Mighty Mobile (using One NZ)	GSM, GPRS, UMTS, HSPA, LTE, 5G NR eSIM : Available	?	Mighty Ape

== Niue ==
As of 2008, Niue has about 385 subscribers in total, a 25% penetration rate.

Rank	Operator	Technology	Subscribers (in millions)	Ownership
1	Telecom Niue	900 MHz GSM; 700 MHz LTE	0.000385 (2008)	Telecom Niue

== Norfolk Island ==
As of October 2008, Norfolk Island has 131 subscribers in total, a 6.5% penetration rate.

Rank	Operator	Technology	Subscribers (in millions)	Ownership
1	Norfolk Telecom	900 MHz UMTS; 700 MHz LTE	0.000131 (October 2008)	Norfolk Telecom

== North Korea ==
As of March 2011 North Korea has over a million subscribers in total.

Rank	Operator	Technology	Subscribers (in millions)	Ownership
1	Koryolink	2100 MHz UMTS	3.8 (end 2015)	Global Telecom Holding S.A.E. (75%); Korea Post and Telecommunications Corporation (25%)
2	Kangsong NET	2100 MHz UMTS ? MHz LTE	Not Yet Available	Ministry of Information Industry

== Northern Mariana Islands ==
As of 2004, the Northern Mariana Islands have 20,500 subscribers in total.

Rank	Operator	Technology	Subscribers (in millions)	Ownership
1	Docomo Pacific	CdmaOne; GSM-1900 MHz (GPRS); UMTS LTE	Not Yet Available	NTT Docomo
2	IT&E	CdmaOne; GSM-850; UMTS, HSPA+ 700 MHz LTE	Not Yet Available	IT&E Overseas Inc

== Pakistan ==
As of October 2026, Pakistan has 212.46 million subscribers in total with a mobile density of 83.73%.

The country's telecom regulator is the PTA (Pakistan Telecommunication Authority).

Mainland Pakistan
Rank	Operator	MCC/MNC Tuple	Technology	Subscribers (in millions)	Ownership
1	Jazz (PMCL - Pakistan Mobile Communications Limited)	410 / 01 410 / 07	2G: 900 MHz (GPRS, EDGE) 4G: 900 (B8) / 1800 (B3) / 2100 (B1) / 2500 (B41) MHz (LTE/LTE-A) 5G: 700 (n28) / 2300 (n40) / 2500 (n41) / 3500 (n78) MHz (5G NR): VoLTE; VoWiFi	77.25	VEON Ltd. (100%)
2	Ufone (PTML - Pak Telecommunication Mobile Limited)	410 / 03 410 / 06	2G: 900 MHz (GPRS, EDGE) 4G: 850 (B5) / 900 (B8) / 1800 (B3) / 2100 (B1) MHz (LTE/LTE-A) 5G: 2500 (n41) / 3500 (n78) MHz (5G NR): VoLTE	76.55	PTCL (100%)
3	Zong (CMPak Ltd - China Mobile Pakistan Limited)	410 / 04	2G: 900 / 1800 MHz (GPRS, EDGE) 3G: 2100 MHz (UMTS, HSPA+, DC-HSPA+) 4G: 900 (B8) / 1800 (B3) / 2100 (B1) MHz (LTE/LTE-A) 5G: 2500 (n41) / 3500 (n78) MHz (5G NR): VoLTE; VoWiFi	56.55	China Mobile Limited (100%)
Mobile Virtual Network Operators (MVNOs)
—	Onic (Ufone MVNO)	410 / 03 410 / 06	2G: 900 MHz (GPRS, EDGE) 4G: 850 (B5) / 900 (B8) / 1800 (B3) / 2100 (B1) MHz (LTE/LTE-A) 5G: 2500 (n41) / 3500 (n78) MHz (5G NR)	N/A	Ufone
—	ROX (Jazz MVNO)	410 / 01 410 / 07	2G: 900 MHz (GPRS, EDGE) 4G: 900 (B8) / 1800 (B3) / 2100 (B1) / 2500 (B41) MHz (LTE/LTE-A) 5G: 700 (n28) / 2300 (n40) / 2500 (n41) / 3500 (n78) MHz (5G NR): VoLTE; VoWiFi	N/A	Jazz
AJK and Gilgit-Baltistan
—	SCO (Special Communications Organization) Roams on Ufone in Mainland Pakistan	410 / 05	2G: 900 MHz (EDGE) 3G: 2100 MHz (HSPA+) 4G: 1800 (B3) MHz (LTE)	2.10	Government of Pakistan, MoITT

== Palau ==
As of 2016, Palau has 23,743 subscribers in total.

Rank	Operator	MCC/MNC	Technology	Subscribers (in millions)	Ownership
1	PalauCel	552-01	2G: EDGE 900 MHz 3G: UMTS 900 MHz (Band 8) 4G: LTE 700 MHz (Band 28)	0.023743 (2016)	Palau National Communications Corporation (PNCC)

== Papua New Guinea ==
As of March 2011, the penetration rate in Papua New Guinea was estimated at 47.595% over a population estimate of around 6.2 million.

Rank	Operator	Technology	Subscribers (in millions)	Ownership
1	Telstra	GSM-900 MHz(GPRS, EDGE); 900 MHz UMTS, HSDPA; 700 MHz LTE	Not Yet Available	Telstra
2	Vodafone	GSM-900 MHz(GPRS, EDGE); 900 MHz UMTS, HSDPA; 700 MHz LTE	1.6m	Amalgamated Telecom Holdings Limited
3	BMobile	GSM-900(GPRS); 900 MHz UMTS	Not Yet Available	Pacific Mobile Communications
4	Telikom PNG	850 MHz GSM 1800 MHz LTE	Not Yet Available	Telikom (PNG) LTD

== Philippines ==
As of 1 August 2023, the total number of subscribers in the Philippines was estimated at 113.97 million, a stark contrast from the 167.9 million before the mandatory sim card registration in the country.

The country's telecom regulator is the National Telecommunications Commission (NTC).

Rank	Operator	Technology	Subscribers (in millions)	Ownership
1	Globe Telecom	2G : GSM 900(B8)/1800(B3) (GPRS, EDGE); 3G : 900(B8)/2100(B1) MHz UMTS, HSPA, HSPA+ 4G : 700(B28)/900(B8)/1800(B3)/2100(B1) MHz FDD-LTE, 2300(B40)/2500(B41)/2600(B38) MHz TDD-LTE, WiMAX, LTE, LTE-A; 5G : 3500(n78) MHz 5G NR • VoLTE, VoWIFI : currently available on postpaid and prepaid subscribers • eSIM : available on postpaid and prepaid subscribers	63.1 (November 31, 2025)	Ayala Corporation (13.20%); Singtel (20.10%); Asiacom Philippines, Inc. (50.85%); Directors, Officers, ESOP (0.19%); Public Stock (15.66%)
2	Smart Communications	2G : GSM 900(B8)/1800(B3) (GPRS, EDGE); 3G : 850(B5)/900(B8)/2100(B1) MHz UMTS, HSPA, HSPA+ 4G : 700(B28)/850(B5)/1800(B3)/2100(B1) MHz FDD-LTE,2300(B40)/2500(B41)/3400(B42) TDD-LTE, LTE, LTE-A, WiMAX; 5G : 3500(n78)/2500(n41)/700(n28) MHz 5G NR • VoLTE, VoWIFI, ViLTE : available for postpaid, and prepaid subscribers • eSIM : available on postpaid and prepaid subscribers	59.0 (End of 2024)	PLDT/Public (42.09 percent); NTT DoCoMo, Inc. (14.5 percent); Philippine Telecommunications Investment Corp. (12.05 percent); JG Summit Holdings (11.27 percent); Metro Pacific Resources, Inc. (9.98 percent); NTT Communications Corp (5.85 percent); First Pacific (3.54 percent)
3	Dito Telecommunity	4G : 700(B28)/2000(B34)/2100(B1)/2500(B41)/3300(B52) MHz LTE, LTE-A; 5G : 3500(n78) MHz 5G NR • VoLTE, ViLTE, VoNR • VoWIFI • eSIM : available on postpaid and prepaid subscribers	17.1 (April 1, 2026)	Dito CME Holdings Corporation (60%); China Telecommunications Corporation (40%)
4	Now Telecom	800 MHz	No information available.	Now Corporation (30%)
Mobile Virtual Network Operators
1	TNT (using Smart)	• VoLTE, VoWIFI, ViLTE : Available, need to request activation to use...	No information available	Smart Communications
2	TM (using Globe)	• VoLTE, VoWIFI : available on prepaid subscribers	No information available	Globe Telecom
3	GOMO (using Globe)	No information available	No information available	Globe Telecom
4	KiQ (using Smart)	No information available	No information available	Smart Communications

== Samoa ==
As of January 2021, Samoa had 146,300 subscribers in total, a 73.4% penetration rate.

Rank	Operator	Technology	Subscribers (in millions)	Ownership
1	Vodafone (formerly Bluesky Samoa)	900 MHz GSM; 1800 MHz LTE	Not Yet Available	(75%) Amalgamated Telecom Holdings Limited (25%) Unit Trust of Samoa
2	Telstra (formerly Digicel)	900 MHz GSM, GPRS, EDGE, 2100 MHz UMTS, HSPA+ 700/1800/2100 MHz LTE	Not Yet Available	Telstra

== Singapore ==
As of December 2025, the mobile penetration rate in Singapore was estimated at 160.9% over a population estimate of around 6.11 million, with a total of 9,831,500 mobile subscriptions.

The country's telecom regulator is the Infocomm Media Development Authority.

Rank	Operator	Technology	Subscribers (in millions)	Ownership
1	Singtel with digital sub-brands GOMO and Singtel hi!	4G : 700(B28)/900(B8)/1800(B3)/2600(B7,B38) MHz LTE-A; 5G : 700 MHz(n28)/2.1 GHz(n1)/3.5 GHz(n78) 5G NR-SA; *700 MHz utilising DSS to enable LTE and NR connectivity on B28 and n28 • VoLTE, VoWiFi, VoNR • eSIM : Available	4.547 (August 2026)	Temasek Holdings
2	StarHub with digital sub-brands giga! and eight Telecom	4G : 900(B8)/1800(B3)/2600(B7,B38) MHz LTE-A; 5G : 700 MHz(n28)/2.1 GHz(n1)/3.5 GHz(n78) 5G NR-SA • VoLTE, VoWiFi, VoNR • eSIM : Available	2.219 (August 2026)	ST Telemedia; Ooredoo; NTT Docomo
3	M1 with a digital sub-brand Maxx	4G : 900(B8)/1800(B3)/2600(B7) MHz LTE-A; 5G : 700 MHz(n28)/2.1 GHz(n1)/3.5 GHz(n78) 5G NR-SA • VoLTE, VoWiFi, VoNR • eSIM : Available	2.19 (December 2024)	Keppel Corporation; Singapore Press Holdings; Connectivity Pte. Ltd.
4	SIMBA (formerly TPG Mobile)	4G : 900(B8)/2300(B40)/2600(B38) MHz LTE-A; 5G : 2.1 GHz(n1) 5G NR-NSA • VoLTE, VoWiFi • eSIM : Available	1.412 (March 2026)	TUAS Limited
5	GRID Communications	806-821/851-866 MHz iDEN	N/A	GRID Communications Pte. Ltd.
Mobile virtual network operators
1	Circles.Life (Using M1)	4G : 1800(B3)/2600(B7)/900(B8) MHz LTE-A; 5G : 2.1 GHz(n1)/3.5 GHz(n78) 5G NR-SA • VoLTE • eSIM : Available	0.26 (End 2018)	Liberty Wireless Pte. Ltd.
2	Zero1 (Using Singtel)	4G : 700(B28)/900(B8)/1800(B3)/2600(B7,B38) MHz LTE-A; 5G : 700 MHz(n28)/2.1 GHz(n1)/3.5 GHz(n78) 5G NR-NSA/SA • VoLTE • eSIM : Available		Zero1 Pte. Ltd.
3	MyRepublic (Using StarHub for its 5G plans; Using M1 for its 4G plans)	StarHub: 4G : 1800(B3)/2600(B7)/2100(B1)/2600(B38) MHz LTE-A; 5G : 2.1 GHz(n1)/3.5 GHz(n78) 5G NR-SA, • VoLTE • eSIM : Available M1: 4G : 1800(B3)/2600(B7)/900(B8) MHz LTE-A • VoLTE • eSIM : Available		MyRepublic
4	VIVIFI (Using Singtel)	4G : 700(B28)/900(B8)/1800(B3)/2600(B7,B38) MHz LTE-A; 5G : 700 MHz(n28)/2.1 GHz(n1)/3.5 GHz(n78) 5G NR-NSA/SA • VoLTE • eSIM : Available		Icymi Pte. Ltd.
5	China Mobile CMLink SG (Using Singtel)	4G : 700(B28)/900(B8)/1800(B3)/2600(B7,B38) MHz LTE-A; 5G : 700 MHz(n28)/2.1 GHz(n1)/3.5 GHz(n78) 5G NR-NSA/SA • VoLTE • eSIM : Available		China Mobile International Limited
6	ZYM Mobile (Using Singtel)	4G : 700(B28)/900(B8)/1800(B3)/2600(B7,B38) MHz LTE-A; 5G : 700 MHz(n28)/2.1 GHz(n1)/3.5 GHz(n78) 5G NR-NSA/SA • VoLTE • eSIM : Available		MDR Limited
7	China Unicom CUniq SG (Using StarHub)	4G : 1800(B3)/2600(B7)/2100(B1)/2600(B38) MHz LTE-A; 5G : 2.1 GHz(n1)/3.5 GHz(n78) 5G NR-SA • VoLTE • eSIM : Available		China Unicom (Singapore) Operations Pte. Ltd.

Note:

- Singapore's 2G network shutdown commenced from April 2017 and completed by April 18 of 2017.
- Singapore's 3G network shutdown commenced from August 2024 and completed by end-2024.

== Solomon Islands ==
As of 2008, Solomon Islands has 30,000 subscribers in total.

Rank	Operator	Technology	Subscribers (in millions)	Ownership
1	Our Telekom	900/1800 MHz GSM; 850/2100 MHz UMTS, HSDPA; LTE	0.03 (2008)	Solomon Telekom Company Limited

== South Korea ==
As of October 2023, South Korea has 82.2 million subscribers in total or a 158.9% penetration rate.

Rank	Operator	Technology	Subscribers (in millions)	Ownership
1	SK Telecom	2100 MHz UMTS; 850/1800/2100/2600 MHz LTE-FDD; 3500 MHz 5G NR VoLTE	31.230 (Q4 2023)	SK Group
2	LG U^{+} (formerly LG Telecom)	850/2100/2600 MHz LTE-FDD; 3500 MHz 5G NR VoLTE	18.411 (Q4 2023)	LG Corporation (37%)
3	KT (formerly olleh, KTF)	2100 MHz UMTS; 900/1800/2100 MHz LTE-FDD; 3500 MHz 5G NR VoLTE	17.155 (Q4 2023)	KT Corporation

== Sri Lanka ==
Sri Lanka has 29.7 million subscribers in total, or a 126.7% penetration rate. (March 2026)

The country's telecom regulator is Telecommunications Regulatory Commission of Sri Lanka (TRCSL).

Rank	Operator	Technology	Subscribers (in millions)	Ownership	MCC/MNC Tuple
1	Dialog •Includes the Airtel sub-brand.	2G : GSM-900/1800 (GPRS, EDGE) 3G: Discontinued on November 15, 2023; 4G : 900(B8), 1800(B3), 2100(B1), 2500(B41) MHz LTE-A; 4G Calling (VoLTE) : Supported; 5G Sub-6: 3.5(n78) GHz 5G NR; 5G mmWave: 27(n258) GHz 5G NR (on Trial); 5G Calling (VoNR): Supported; Wi-Fi Calling (VoWiFi) : Supported eSIM : Available	▼18.9(Q1 2026)	Axiata Group Berhad (73.75%); Bharti Airtel Limited (10.36%)	413-02
2	SLTMobitel (formerly Mobitel)	2G : GSM-900/1800 (GPRS, EDGE); 3G : 2100 MHz UMTS, HSPA, HSPA+, DC-HSPA+ 4G : 850(B5), 1800(B3), 2100(B1) MHz LTE-A; 4G Calling (VoLTE) : Supported; 5G Sub-6: 3.5(n78) GHz 5G NR; Wi-Fi Calling (VoWiFi) : Supported eSIM : Available	▼7.1 (Q4 2024)	Sri Lanka Telecom PLC (100%)	413-01
3	Hutch •Includes the previous Etisalat network.	2G : GSM-900/1800 (GPRS, EDGE); 3G : 2100 MHz UMTS, HSPA, HSPA+, DC-HSPA+ 4G : 900(B8), 1800(B3) MHz LTE-FDD; 4G Calling (VoLTE) : Supported; 5G: 3.5(n78) GHz 5G NR (Trial); Wi-Fi Calling (VoWiFi) : Not supported eSIM : Available	▲4.0 (Q4 2025)	CK Hutchison Holdings Limited (85%); Emirates Telecommunication Group Company PJSC (15%)	413-08

Note:

- Hutch has acquired Etisalat on 30 November 2018.
- Dialog discontinued its 3G service on 15 November 2023.
- Dialog has acquired Airtel on 27 June 2024.

== Taiwan ==
As of June 2011, the penetration rate in Taiwan was estimated at 105.354% over a population estimate of around 23 million.

Rank	Operator	Technology	Subscribers (in millions)	Ownership
1	Chunghwa Telecom 中華電信; 466 / 92	3G : 2100 MHz UMTS, HSPA, HSPA+; 4G : 2100(B1)/1800(B3)/2600(B7)/900(B8) MHz LTE, LTE-A Pro, DL up to 5CA, DL/UL 256-QAM; 5G Sub-6 : 900(n8)/2100(n1)/3500(n78) MHz 5G NR-NSA (SA On trial), DL up to 2CA; 5G mmWave : 28000(n257) MHz 5G NR (On trial); VoLTE/EVS: Available; VoWiFi: Available; eSIM: Available *4G and 5G networks share 900/2100 MHz spectrum via DSS *3G network is only available at Taiwan Taoyuan International Airport area	▲11.325 (Aug 2026)	Republic of China Ministry of Transportation and Communications (35.29%); Shin Kong Life Insurance (3.3%); Cathay Life Insurance (2.53%); Chunghwa Post (2.06%)
2	Taiwan Mobile 台灣大哥大; 466 / 97	4G : 2100(B1)/1800(B3)/2600(B7)/900(B8)/700(B28) MHz LTE, LTE-A Pro, DL up to 4CA, DL/UL 256-QAM; 5G Sub-6 : 700(n28)/3500(n78) MHz 5G NR-NSA (SA On trial), DL up to 2CA; 5G mmWave : 28000(n257) MHz 5G NR (On trial); VoLTE: Available; VoWiFi: Available; eSIM: Available *4G and 5G networks share 700 MHz spectrum via DSS	▲8.924 (Aug 2026)	Fubon Group
3	Far EasTone 遠傳電信; 466 / 01	4G: 2100(B1)/1800(B3)/2600(B7)/700(B28)/2600(B38) MHz LTE, LTE-A Pro, DL up to 4CA, DL/UL 256-QAM; 5G Sub-6: 700(n28)/2600(n38)/3500(n78) MHz 5G NR-NSA (SA On trial); 5G mmWave: 28000(n257) MHz 5G NR (On trial); VoLTE: Available; VoWiFi: Available; eSIM: Available *4G and 5G networks share 700 MHz spectrum via DSS	▲8.168 (Aug 2026)	Far Eastern Group
Mobile virtual network operators
1	Ibon Mobile (Using FarEasTone)	4G: 2100(B1)/1800(B3)/2600(B7)/700(B28)/2600(B38) MHz LTE		7-Eleven

• All Taiwan's mobile network operators shut down 2G network in June 2017
• All Taiwan's mobile network operators shut down 3G network in June 2024

== Tajikistan ==
Tajikistan has an estimated 4.5 million subscribers in total, a 42% penetration rate.

Rank	Operator	Technology	Subscribers (in millions)	Ownership
1	Tcell	GSM-900/1800 MHz (GPRS, EDGE); 2100 MHz UMTS, HSDPA, HSUPA, HSPA, HSPA+, DC-HSPA+ 800 MHz LTE	3.301 (2013)	Aga Khan Fund for Economic Development (100%)
2	Babilon-Mobile	GSM-900 MHz (GPRS, EDGE); 2100 MHz UMTS, HSDPA, HSUPA, HSPA, HSPA+, DC-HSPA+ 1800/2100 MHz LTE	0.8 (March 2008)	
3	ZET Mobile (Formerly Beeline)	GSM-900/1800 MHz (GPRS, EDGE); 2100 MHz UMTS, HSDPA, HSUPA, HSPA, HSPA+, DC-HSPA+	0.836 (May 2011)	ZET Mobile Ltd. (100%)
4	MegaFon	GSM-900/1800 MHz (GPRS, EDGE); 2100 MHz UMTS, HSDPA, HSUPA, HSPA, HSPA+, DC-HSPA+	0.517 (May 2011)	MegaFon (75%)

== Thailand ==
As of December 2020, the mobile penetration rate in Thailand was 135% over a population of around 69.71 million.

Rank	Operator	Technology	Subscribers (in millions)	Ownership
1	True • Includes Truemove-H and dtac (with a digital sub-brand FINN Mobile)	2G : GSM-900 MHz 3G : UMTS, HSPA, HSPA+: B1/B8; 4G : FDD LTE: B1/B3/B8/B28 TDD LTE: B40/B41 SDL LTE: B32 4.5G : LTE-A Pro Up to 5xCA, Nationwide 4x4MIMO, 256QAM, Uplink CA 4G Calling (VoLTE, ViLTE) : Supported; Wi-Fi Calling (VoWiFi) : Supported; 5G : NR-NSA, NR-SA FR1 : FDD NR: n28, TDD NR: n40/n41 FR2 : n258 (B1, B3, B8, B28, B32, B40, B41, n258 = 2100/1800/900/700/1500/2300/2600 MHz/26 GHz respectively)	48.8 (Q1/2025)	Major shareholders: Telenor (28.60%); Thai NVDR (11.58%); Charoen Pokphand (10.37%); China Mobile (7.81%)
2	AIS or Advanced Info Service (with a digital sub-brand GOMO)	2G : GSM-900 MHz; 3G : UMTS/WCDMA: B1; 4G : FDD LTE: B1/B3/B8/B28 TDD LTE: B41; 4.5G : LTE-A Pro Up to 4xCA, Nationwide 4x4MIMO, 256QAM, Uplink CA; 4G Calling (VoLTE, ViLTE) : Supported; Wi-Fi Calling (VoWiFi) : Supported 5G : NR-NSA, NR-SA, NR-CA 5G Calling (VoNR) : Supported FR1 : FDD NR: n1/n28, TDD NR: n41 FR2 : n258 (B1, B3, B8, B28, B41, n258 = 2100/1800/900/700/2600 MHz/26 GHz respectively)	45.7 (Q1/2025)	Major shareholders: Intouch Holdings (40.44%); Singtel (19.10%); Thai NVDR (7.19%)
3	my by NT	3G : UMTS/WCDMA : B1 (Roaming on AIS); 4G : FDD LTE : B28 (With B1/B3/B8/B41 Roaming on AIS); 4.5G : Up to 2xCA B1+B3, nationwide 4x4 MIMO on B3, 256QAM 4G Calling (VoLTE) : Supported 5G : NR-NSA FR1 : TDD NR: n41 (Roaming on AIS) FR2 : n258 (B1, B3, B8, B28, B41, n258 = 2100/1800/900/700/2600 MHz/26 GHz respectively)	2.8 (EOY 2020)	National Telecom
4	NT Mobile (formerly TOT Mobile)	Out of Service as of 03/08/2025. Automatic migration to my by NT	0.533 (EOY 2020)	TOT Public Company Limited Migrating to my by nt in August 2025
Mobile Virtual Network Operators
1	IEC3G Buzzme (Host operator TOT)	3G : UMTS/WCDMA : B1	Closed January 2019	Mobile 8 Telco Sdn Bhd.
2	i-Kool 3G (Host operator TOT)	3G : UMTS/WCDMA : B1	0.002251	Loxley Public Company Limited.
3	MyWorld 3G (Host operator CAT)	3G : UMTS/WCDMA : B5	Closed	Data CDMA Communication Co., Ltd.
4	Penguin (Host operator CAT & TOT)	3G : UMTS/WCDMA : B1/B5	0.029690	The WhiteSpace Co.Ltd.
5	OPEN SIM i-mobile (Host operator CAT)	3G : UMTS/WCDMA : B5	Closed June 2017	Samart Corporation Public Company Limited.
6	imobile-3GX (Host operator CAT)	3G : UMTS/WCDMA : B5	Closed June 2017	Samart Corporation Public Company Limited.
7	168 (Host operator CAT)	3G : UMTS/WCDMA : B5	Closed 2018	168 Communication Co Ltd.
8	Mojo 3G (Host operator TOT)	3G : UMTS/WCDMA : B1	Closed January 2017	MConzult Asia Co., Ltd.
9	Tune Talk (Host operator TOT)	3G : UMTS/WCDMA : B1 2100 MHz	Closed	Loxley Public Company Limited (50%); Tune Group Sdn Bhd (10%); Thai AirAsia Co., Ltd. (40%)
10	Feels (Host operator TOT)	3G : UMTS/WCDMA : B1 2100 MHz; 4G : LTE-FDD : B1 2100 MHz; 4.5G : TDD LTE : B40 2300 MHz	0.004574 (EOY 2020)	Feels Telecom Corporation Co., Ltd.
11	AJ SIM (Host operator TOT)	3G : UMTS/WCDMA : B1 2100 MHz; 4G : LTE-FDD : B1 2100 MHz; 4.5G : TDD LTE : B40 2300 MHz	Launched November 2020	AJ Advance Technology Pcl.
12	Redone (Host operator NT Mobile (formerly TOT Mobile))	3G : UMTS/WCDMA : B1 2100 MHz; 4G : LTE-FDD : B1 2100 MHz; 4.5G : TDD LTE : B40 2300 MHz	Launched May 2021	Red One Network (Thailand) Co., Ltd

== Timor-Leste ==
Mobile subscribers reach 1.54m at End-2017

Rank	Operator	Technology	Subscribers (in millions)	Ownership
1	Telemor	GSM-850 MHz UMTS LTE	0.726913 (End 2017)	Viettel
2	Timor Telecom	GSM-900 UMTS LTE	0.620204 (Q2 2015)	Timor Telecom
3	Telkomcel	GSM-850UMTS LTE	0.16 (Mid 2015)	Telekomunikasi Indonesia International (TL) S.A.

== Tonga ==
As of November 2007, Tonga has 0.03 million subscribers in total.

Rank	Operator	Technology	Subscribers (in millions)	Ownership
1	Telstra	900 MHz GSM, GPRS; 1800 MHz LTE	0.020 (November 2007)	Telstra Group Limited
2	TCC	900 MHz GSM, GPRS; UMTS	0.010 (November 2007)	Tonga Government
3	Wantok	900 MHz GSM, GPRS; UMTS	0.010 (November 2007)	Tonga Government

== Turkmenistan ==
As of 2012, Turkmenistan has 4.44 million subscribers in total or 88.8% penetration rate.

Rank	Operator	Technology	Subscribers (in millions)	Ownership
1	TM CELL (Altyn Asyr)	GSM-900/1800 MHz (GPRS, EDGE); 2100 MHz UMTS, HSDPA, HSUPA, HSPA, HSPA+, DC-HSPA+ LTE	3 (October 2012)	TM CELL
2	AȘTU	CDMA ETS 450 D	0.055 (August 2018)	Ashgabat City Telephone Network

== Tuvalu ==
As of 2008, Tuvalu has 2,000 subscribers in total.

Rank	Operator	Technology	Subscribers (in millions)	Ownership
1	TTC	900 MHz GSM; LTE	0.002 (2008)	TTC

== Uzbekistan ==
The country's telecom regulator is Oʻzkomnazorat.

Rank	Operator	Technology	Subscribers (in millions)	Ownership
1	Ucell (Formerly Coscom)	GSM-900/1800 MHz (GPRS, EDGE); 2100 MHz UMTS, HSDPA, HSUPA, HSPA, HSPA+, DC-HSPA+ 700/1800/2600 MHz LTE; 3300(n78) mmWave, 5G NR	10 (Q4 2024)	ООО «COSCOM»
2	Beeline	GSM-900/1800 MHz (GPRS, EDGE); 2100 MHz UMTS, HSDPA, HSUPA, HSPA, HSPA+, DC-HSPA+ 2600 MHz LTE	8.3 (Q4 2024)	VEON, ООО «Unitel»
3	Uzmobile	CdmaOne; 1800 MHz LTE; 3300(n78) mmWave, 5G NR	8 (Q4 2024)	Uztelecom
4	Mobiuz (Formerly UMS)	GSM-900/1800 MHz (GPRS, EDGE), 2100 MHz UMTS, HSDPA, HSUPA, HSPA, HSPA+, DC-HSPA+ 800 MHz LTE; 3300(n78) mmWave, 5G NR	7.8 (Q4 2024)	OOO «UMS»
5	Perfectum	5G Standalone 850 MHz (n5), 3800 MHz (n77)		

== Vanuatu ==
As of 2022, Vanuatu has 327,000 subscribers in total.

Rank	Operator	Technology	Subscribers (in millions)	Ownership
1	Vodafone Vanuatu	GSM-900 MHz	Unknown	Vodafone Vanuatu
2	Telstra	GSM-900 MHzGPRS, EDGE; 900 MHz UMTS, HSPA 700 MHz LTE	2.8 million (across Pacific)	Telstra Group Limited
3	AIL	GSM-900 MHz	Not Yet Available	ACES International
4	WanTok	2300 MHz TDD-LTE	Not Yet Available	

== Vietnam ==
As of 2019, Vietnam had around 126 million mobile phone subscriptions. 2G coverage was shut down nationally in October 2024 freeing the resources for 4G and 5G.

The country's telecom regulator is the Ministry of Science and Technology

Rank	Operator	Technology	Subscribers (in millions, not precise)	Ownership
1	Viettel	UMTS, HSPA+ 1800 MHz LTE; 2500 MHz 5G NR	66 (2019)	Ministry of Defence
2	Vinaphone	UMTS, HSPA+ 1800 MHz LTE2500 MHz 5G NR	26 (2019)	Vietnam Posts and Telecommunications Group
3	MobiFone	UMTS; 1800 MHz LTE 2500 MHz 5G NR	23 (2019)	Ministry of Public Security
4	Vietnamobile	UMTS, HSPA+ 1800 MHz LTE	6 (2019)	Hanoi TelecomHutchison Asia Telecom

== See also ==
- Mobile Network Codes in ITU region 4xx (Asia)
- Mobile Network Codes in ITU region 5xx (Oceania)
- List of LTE networks
- List of mobile network operators worldwide
- List of mobile network operators of the Americas
- List of mobile network operators of The Caribbean
- List of mobile network operators of Europe
- List of mobile network operators of the Middle East and Africa
