= Telephone numbers in Thailand =

- Country: Thailand
- Continent: Asia
- Regulator: National Broadcasting and Telecommunications Commission
- Numbering plan type: closed
- NSN length: 8-9
- Country code: +66
- International access: 00
- Long-distance: 0

Thailand's telephone numbering plan is managed by the National Broadcasting and Telecommunications Commission (NBTC) in accordance with International Telecommunication Union's (ITU) recommendation E.164.

== Geographic area codes ==

Geographic (fixed line) area codes are, excluding the STD prefix, one digit in Bangkok and nearby provinces (area code 2) and two digits in all other provinces (area codes 3x, 4x, 5x, and 7x). In Thailand, an area code is usually shared by several provinces and roughly follows provincial borders.

Fixed-line subscriber numbers are six digits in Thailand (except Bangkok, Nonthaburi, Pathum Thani, and Samut Prakan, i.e., area code 2). Prior to 1980, subscriber numbers were six digits in Bangkok, Nonthaburi, Pathum Thani, and Samut Prakan. In 1980, subscriber numbers in these areas were expanded to seven digits in phases to meet new demands. The first digit of a subscriber number is associated with a specific locale within the area code. In Bangkok, Nonthaburi, Pathum Thani, and Samut Prakan, the second digit of a subscriber number identifies the service provider, which is almost always National Telecom (NT), as NT holds a near-monopoly of the Thai fixed-line market.

Thus, a full national number is 9 digits, including the STD prefix 0. When writing a telephone number with the area code, the area code and subscriber number are separated by a hyphen, also in the middle of subscriber number. Examples:

- A number 2134567 in Bangkok: 02-2134567
- A number 213456 in Nakhon Ratchasima: 044-213456

Thailand switched to a closed dialing plan in 2001, which means that calling within the area code requires the area code to be dialed. E.g., When calling a number 2134567 in Bangkok (02) from a fixed-line phone:

- Within Bangkok, Nonthaburi, Pathum Thani, and Samut Prakan: 02-2134567
- Outside Bangkok, Nonthaburi, Pathum Thani, and Samut Prakan: 02-2134567
- Outside Thailand: +66-2-2134567 (the initial 0 of the area code is omitted)

Area Code	Area Served
02	Bangkok (Krung Thep Maha Nakhon), Nonthaburi, Pathum Thani, Samut Prakan, Phutthamonthon (Nakhon Pathom)
032	Phetchaburi, Prachuap Khiri Khan, Ratchaburi
034	Kanchanaburi, Nakhon Pathom (except Phutthamonthon), Samut Sakhon, Samut Songkhram
035	Ang Thong, Phra Nakhon Si Ayutthaya, Suphan Buri
036	Lop Buri, Saraburi, Sing Buri
037	Nakhon Nayok, Prachin Buri, Sa Kaeo
038	Chachoengsao, Chon Buri, Rayong
039	Chanthaburi, Trat
042	Bueng Kan, Loei, Mukdahan, Nakhon Phanom, Nong Bua Lamphu, Nong Khai, Sakon Nakhon, Udon Thani
043	Kalasin, Khon Kaen, Maha Sarakham, Roi Et, Nam Nao (Phetchabun)
044	Buri Ram, Chaiyaphum, Nakhon Ratchasima, Surin
045	Amnat Charoen, Si Sa Ket, Ubon Ratchathani, Yasothon
052	Chiang Mai, Chiang Rai, Lamphun, Mae Hong Son
053	Chiang Mai, Chiang Rai, Lamphun, Mae Hong Son
054	Lampang, Nan, Phayao, Phrae
055	Kamphaeng Phet, Phitsanulok, Sukhothai, Tak, Uttaradit, Sam Ngam, Wachirabarami (Phichit)
056	Chai Nat, Nakhon Sawan, Phetchabun (except Nam Nao), Phichit (except Sam Ngam & Wachirabarami), Uthai Thani
073	Narathiwat, Pattani, Yala
074	Phatthalung, Satun, Songkhla
075	Krabi, Nakhon Si Thammarat, Trang
076	Phang Nga, Phuket
077	Chumphon, Ranong, Surat Thani

== Mobile phone codes and IP telephony ==
Mobile phone codes are in area codes 8 and 9, and VoIP are in the area code 6, plus a second digit, resulting in two digits excluding the leading zero.

Originally, each mobile phone operator was issued one mobile phone code. Through a series of mergers, there are currently three major mobile phone operators: AIS, True and DTAC. As existing numbers run out, the three mobile phone operators are assigned numbers in code 081, distinguished by the first digit of the subscriber number.

A mobile phone number consists of a mobile phone code and a seven-digit subscriber number. Therefore, a mobile phone number is written as 0641163685

Mobile phones in Thailand use 900/1800 MHz for GSM. Domestic roaming service is available free within Thailand in places where there is only a single transmitter in place due to restrictions.

As codes are being exhausted, a new range, 09x, is available for assignment. Despite the length of the code, subscriber numbers are seven digits, resulting in a ten-digit national number including the leading zero. Starting 28 April 2011, the prefix 090 followed by seven digits was available for use.

Code	Service
060	TrueMove (VoIP)
061	AIS
062	AIS
063	AIS
064	TRUE
065	AIS
066	DTAC
068	TOT (VoIP)
080-0 to 080-2	AIS
080-3	TrueMove
080-4 to 080-5	DTAC
080-6	AIS
081-0 to 081-2	AIS
081-3 to 081-6	DTAC
081-7 to 081-9	AIS
082	AIS
083	TrueMove
084	AIS
085	DTAC
085-4	AIS
086	TrueMove
087	AIS
088	TrueMove
089	TrueMove H
090	DTAC
090-1	AIS
090-9	True Move H, AIS
091	TrueMove H
092	AIS
093	AIS, TrueMove H
093-1	AIS
093-5	AIS
093-6	AIS
094	DTAC, TrueMove H
094-0 to 094-1	TrueMove H
094-22 to 094-23	TrueMove H
095	TrueMove H
095-6	TrueMove H
095	TrueMove H
096	TrueMove H
097	AIS, TrueMove H
098	AIS
099	AIS, TrueMove H, DTAC
099-5	TrueMove H

== Non-geographical short codes and special numbers ==
Code	Service
100	Universal operator service (formerly fixed telephone and facsimile fault report)
101	Operator assistance for domestic calls (to be combined to 100)
102	Operator service assistance (to be combined to 100)
1100	TOT
1111	Thai Government Call Center
1112	The Pizza Company
1133	Fixed telephone directory assistance
1150	KFC & Pizza Hut
1153	B-Quick
1155	Tourist Police
1175	AIS
1188-xxx-xxxx	Paging service (now abolished)
1193	Highway Police
1242	True Move, True Move H
1266	Major Development PCL
1333	Bangkok Bank (Bualuang Phone)
1401-xxx-xxx	Toll-free numbers
1425	Central (Central Call & Shop)
02-132-1888 & 1722	Flights, Suvarnabhumi Airport
02-535-1192	Flights, other airports
1586	Department of Highway
1669	Medical Emergency
1678	DTAC
1690	State Railway of Thailand
1691	Ambulance Service Center
1711	McDonald's
1811	Thailand Standard Time automated number
1888	National Telecom
1800-xxx-xxx	Toll-free numbers (from landlines only)
1900-xxx-xxx	Premium-rate telephone number
191	Universal emergency service
199	Fire Department
02-111-1111	Krungthai Bank
02-777-7777	Siam Commercial Bank (SCB Call Center)
02-888-8888	KASIKORNBANK (K-Contact Center)

== International dialling ==
International dialling from Thailand follows the following pattern:

Carrier selection code – Country calling code – Area code (if required, usually for landlines) – Subscriber number

Carrier selection codes, which direct the call via one of several providers, are as follows:

- 001 – CAT Telecom
- 003 – AIS
- 004 – Total Access Communication
- 005 – AIN Globalcom
- 006 – True Move
- 009 – CAT Telecom (low cost, using VoIP)

== Emergency numbers ==
As of 2021 Thailand has nearly 100 "hotline" telephone numbers to call for assistance. They include 911 or 191 for emergencies, fire, or unwanted intruding animals; 1699 or 1669 (or 1646 or 1554 in Bangkok) for medical emergencies; tourist police, 1155; car theft, 1192; transportation complaints, 1584; road accidents, 1146.
