= NT Stadium =

Football stadium in Lak Si, Bangkok, Thailand

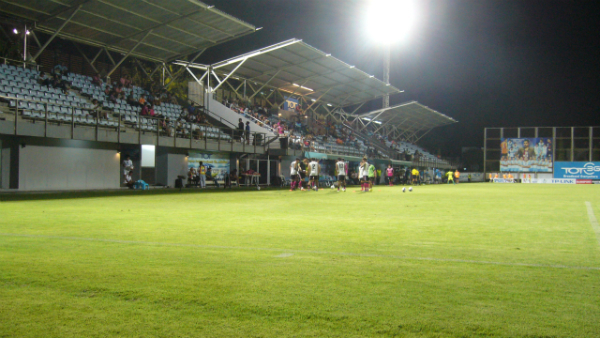
- Interactive map of NT Stadium
- Location: Lak Si, Bangkok, Thailand
- Coordinates: 13°53′03″N 100°34′37″E
- Owner: National Telecom
- Operator: National Telecom
- Capacity: 5,000
- Surface: Grass
- Public transit: MRT National Telecom; SRT Lak Si

Construction
- Opened: 2010

Tenants
- Police Tero (2025–present); Prime Bangkok (2025–present)

NT Stadium (Thai: สนามเอ็นที สเตเดี้ยม) is a football stadium in Lak Si, Bangkok, Thailand. It is used for football matches at several competitions and levels and is the home stadium of Police Tero. The stadium holds 5,000 spectators.

== Name ==
The name of the ground changed, it was changed from the original name, TOT Stadium to NT Stadium following the establishment and corporatized to National Telecom (NT) in 2021 by resulting from the merger of CAT Telecom and TOT Public Company Limited.

== Historical tenants ==
Tenants of NT Stadium have been Thai professional football clubs as follows.

- TOT S.C. in 2010–2016
- Kasetsart in 2017–2020
- Police Tero in 2025–present
