= Salamfone =

Malaysian telecommunications company

Salamfone Sdn Bhd
- Company type: Private Limited
- Industry: Telecommunication
- Defunct: 1 August 2013
- Headquarters: Bangsar, Kuala Lumpur, Malaysia
- Area served: Malaysia
- Products: Mobile Prepaid
- Parent: Reach Telecom Holdings K.S.C.C.
- Website: salamfone.my

Salamfone, a subsidiary of Kuwait’s Reach Telecom, was the world's first Syariah compliant mobile network. The Mobile Virtual Network Operator (MVNO) operated using the Maxis 2G network. Salamfone closed down its business on 1 August 2013.

== Services and coverage ==
The prepaid starter pack was priced at RM8.50 with RM5 airtime. Voice calls were charged RM0.20/min(normal rate is 25sen/min) to all network nationwide & each SMS costed 10sen. Data was pay-per-use and it was charged 10sen/10kb.

Some of the services provided by Salamfone:

- Infaq-One sen was donated by Salamfone every time a customer calls another Salamfone customer
- Talian Hidayah – dedicated Islamic helpline
- Islamic Auspicious Days reminder and bonus
- Free inspiring religious SMS
- Islamic tunes – Nasyid and Islamic RBT
- Subscription Islamic Value Added Services
- Reload transfer

Salamfone was planned to be aggressively marketed at Kedah, Perlis, Terengganu and Kelantan as these locations have the highest concentration of Muslim residents in Malaysia. The service was primarily targeted to those in the age group of 17 to 55.

== Developments ==
Salamfone, which received shariah certification in 2010, banned a number of things such as pornographic pictures sent and received through their lines.

== Termination ==
In late-July 2013, during the final weeks of the Ramadan holy month, and with Hari Raya Aidilfitri around the corner, Salamfone users began to experience a series of service disruptions. It was later known that Salamfone was in the process of settling certain disputes with its host network Maxis. After a series of disagreements between Salamfone and Maxis, it was later decided that Maxis will terminate Salamfone's services and hence, Salamfone was forcibly shut down.

On August 1, Subscribers were given the option to migrate to a different service provider. Existing Salamfone subscribers with unused credits had the choice to either request a refund or transfer their unused credits to "XOX," another MVNO (Mobile Virtual Network Operator) operator, in order to continue their services there.
