= Asia-America Gateway =

Submarine communications cable system

- Total length: 20,000-kilometre (12,000 mi)
- Date of first use: 10 November 2009; 16 years ago

The Asia-America Gateway (AAG) is a 20,000-kilometre (12,000 mi) long submarine communications cable system, connecting South-East Asia with the mainland of the United States, across the Pacific Ocean via Guam and Hawaii.

The cable is capable of delivering up to 2.88 Tbit/s (US–Hawaii and Hong Kong–South East Asia) and 1.92 Tbit/s (Hawaii–Hong Kong). The cable was ready for service on November 10, 2009.

Development of the AAG cable system was funded, at a cost of $500 million USD, by 19 partners: AT&T (United States), BayanTel (Philippines), Bharti (India), BT Global Network Services (UK), CAT Telecom (Thailand), ETPI (Philippines), FPT Telecom (Vietnam), Authority for Info-Communications Technology Industry (Brunei Darussalam), Indosat (Indonesia), PLDT (Philippines), Saigon Postal Corporation (Vietnam), StarHub (Singapore), Ezecom/Telcotech (Cambodia), Telkom Indonesia (Indonesia), Telstra (Australia), Telekom Malaysia (Malaysia), Telecom New Zealand (New Zealand), Viettel (Vietnam), and the Vietnam Posts and Telecommunications Group. The cable has landing points at California (United States), Hawaii (United States), Guam, Philippines, Hong Kong, Malaysia, Singapore, Thailand, Brunei and Vietnam.

== Outages ==
The AAG cable is notorious for its frequent breaks and outages since it was made ready for service in late 2009. Most of the outages have been located at the intra-Asia segments between Hong Kong and Singapore, with most problems occurring in the Vietnam section, while the segment between Hong Kong and the Philippines seems to have fewer problems. The segments between the Philippines and the United States are quite stable. Not only Vietnam, but also countries like Cambodia, Thailand, and Malaysia, which currently have fewer alternatives in place to reroute Internet traffic, are prone to severe service disruption when the AAG cable breaks, whereas Hong Kong, Singapore, and the Philippines, which are served by many different intra-Asia cables, are less affected.

=== 2011 ===
On March 10, the cable segment off the coast of Vung Tau, the AAG Cable landing point in Vietnam, was damaged causing severe disruption to international internet services throughout Vietnam and other countries in Southeast Asia. On March 27, the cable was finally repaired, restoring full internet capacity.

Two more cable breaks occurred in the cable segment off Vung Tau on August 6 and August 31, disrupting Internet services in parts of Southeast Asia.

On October 2, a break occurred in the cable segment between Hong Kong and the Philippines. Because the segment forms part of the cable's trunk, rather than a branch, internet services were disrupted throughout Southeast Asia.

=== 2013 ===
On December 20, 2013, the segment off the coast of Vung Tau was again damaged, affecting some 60% of international Internet traffic.

=== 2014 ===
On July 15, 2014, the segment off the coast of Vung Tau was again damaged, and the internet bandwidth to international destinations was disrupted. VNPT's Viet Nam Data Communications Company Deputy Director Nguyen Hong Hai, said that the time that it would take for repairing the cable had not yet been determined. On July 27, the line was finally mended, 3 days earlier than the scheduled date.

On September 15, 2014, a segment of the cable between Vung Tau and Hong Kong was damaged, which was expected to cause network slowdowns in Malaysia, Singapore, Thailand, Brunei, Vietnam, Hong Kong, Guam and the Philippines. In early reports, the cable break was identified as being in the same area as the July 15 incident, off the Vietnamese shoreline near Vung Tau. A representative of Vietnam's FPT Telecom said that this incident was most likely caused by anchors from local ships dragging along the shoreline, and blamed the cable's poor technical design as a factor in the repeated breaks. Later reports contradicted earlier reports of the break being off the coast of Vung Tau, stating instead that section S1I, off the coast of Hong Kong, had ruptured.

Initially expected to be mended within the 20 days of the incident, repairs experienced a setback when a new rupture was found. The new break, 68 km (42 mi)off the coast of Hong Kong, was only 4 km (2.5 mi) away from the original one. A date of October 3, 2014, was given for full restoration of service, with repair operations continuing until October 5.

=== 2015 ===
On January 5, 2015, the cable was damaged yet again at section S1H which connects Vung Tau and Hong Kong. The Vung Tau station launched a search effort in order to identify the point of fracture. Internet speeds returned to normal once the fault was identified and repaired by January 22, 2015.

The snail-paced Internet speed users in Vietnam have been suffering since Thursday, April 23, 2015, is not brought about by a submarine cable cut as widely thought and it will take three weeks, or a month at worst, for repairs. This is the second time this submarine cable is causing headaches to Vietnamese accessing US and European sites. With the increasing use of YouTube and Facebook, the internet in Vietnam comes to a crawl and "Err-timed out" and "unable to find website" became a common error message when accessing overseas websites.

Another outage occurred on May 26, along with a scheduled maintenance outage in June.

2015 was viewed as one of the most troublesome years for the AAG submarine cable. However, 2017 has now taken over as the year with the most outages for the Asia-American Gateway Internet cable.

=== 2016 ===
The Asia-American Gateway cable underwent maintenance again from June 22 to 28, 2016, slowing down internet connections between Southeast Asia and North America.

On August 2, 2016, the AAG cable snapped again, about 90 km from the South Lantau landing station in Hong Kong. The incident seriously affected the quality of Internet services in Southeast Asia. Repairs were completed on August 24, 2016.

=== 2017 ===
On January 8, 2017, Vietnam's internet speed slowed following problems with AAG. The disruption was triggered by a problem off the southern town of Vung Tau. The issue was resolved on January 26, 2017.

About 3 weeks later, the second breakdown of the year happened on February 18 at a section between Vietnam and Hong Kong. The cause was unknown and the repairs were completed only 7 weeks later, on April 6.

Another outage happened on 27 August 2017 after Typhoon Hato and Tropical Storm Pakhar (2017) caused dual cuts on S1 and S2 just off Southern Lantau (SLT) causing traffic transiting Hong Kong and Southeast Asia to Guam to crawl. Two other submarine Internet cables connecting Southeast Asia to the rest of the world (SEA-ME-WE_3 and TGN-Intra Asia) were also affected. The outage severely slowed internet a full month. Repairs were finished on 26 September 2017.

Only 3 weeks after the repair, on October 12, 2017, it was reported AAG suffered from outage due to problems in parts near Hong Kong. Connections were restored on October 24, 2017.

Southeast Asia (mainly Indochina) had good Internet connections with North America restored for 2 weeks only, as the AAG cable section near Vietnam was ruptured for a fifth time in 2017 on November 7. This time—as the newspaper Việt Nam News reported—"at a cable branch from Ho Chi Minh City", which in fact is at the section off Vung Tau once again. Repairs were scheduled to take place between 28 November and 2 December 2017. However, due to bad weather, repair was delayed twice, first to between December 14–18 and then again to 'sometime' after December 26, because the repair vessel will first tend to another broken internet cable, SEA-ME-WE_3.

The November-December outage of AAG cable will be an all-time record, surpassing the almost 7 week long breakdown earlier this year.

2017 is the most troublesome year for the Asia-America Gateway internet cable, so far. In total the connection was—for countries in Southeast Asia—interrupted in 2017 for at least 157 days, or 43% of the year. If only taking into account the last 6 months of 2017, AAG performed even worse with outages for at least 92 days, or more than 50% of the time.

=== 2018 ===
Because of the expansion of Singapore Changi Airport, AAG cables had to be moved. This disruption was announced. The outage started on January 6, 2018, but the cable's capacity was back within a day. However, new faults were detected and a reconfiguration was carried out. The complete restoration of the undersea cable took much longer. It was only completed on January 23, 2018. These occasions of AAG disruptions are considered proactive disconnections.

On May 22, 2018, AAG encountered a technical problem, affecting internet connections from Southeast Asia. Repair work began three days later. AAG's connections were restored on June 3, but repair works were continuing until June 5.

Less than 2 weeks after the repair, another incident occurred: AAG connections from Southeast Asia were disrupted again on June 16, prompting the online newspaper VnExpress to make this headline: "Disaster-prone cable drags internet in Vietnam again". It was unclear whether the disruption was caused by a cable breakage or a power leakage. Repairs were completed on July 13, 2018, meaning the AAG cable was out for 4 weeks.

The fourth breakdown of the AAG internet cable in 2018 occurred on August 23 of that year, due to a power leakage at a point about 250 kilometers offshore the cable's landing point in Vung Tau.

=== 2020 ===
On September 23, 2020, Philippine internet service providers PLDT and Sky Cable were among the ISPs that announced that their respective networks will be affected by a 5-day emergency maintenance of the AAG submarine cables near Hong Kong from 8 a.m. of September 25 to 5 a.m. of September 30. PLDT advised its customers, as well as those of its subsidiary Smart Communications, that they may experience "degraded internet connectivity during peak hours" during the maintenance period. Despite strong criticism from several users, who expressed concerns such as possible effects on remote learning, PLDT assured the public that they have put in place measures to minimize the effects of the maintenance activities. Sky Cable announced that they have activated back-up capacity to minimize the effects on their customers. On the other hand, Globe Telecom and Converge ICT announced that their customers will not be affected by this maintenance activity. On September 24, PLDT announced that the start of the 5-day maintenance activity was postponed to September 26. In light of the situation, several academic institutions have announced a suspension of online classes during the said period.
