= Asia Pacific Gateway =

- Total length: 10,400 km
- Design capacity: 54Tbps
- Date of first use: 31 October 2016

Asia Pacific Gateway (APG) is a submarine communications cable system that connects mainland China, Hong Kong, Japan, South Korea, Malaysia, Taiwan, Thailand, Vietnam and Singapore. It will be about 10,400 kilometres (6,500 mi) long. The capacity will be 54.8 terabits per second. The APG cable consortium includes Facebook, CAT Telecom, China Telecom, China Mobile International, China Unicom, Chunghwa Telecom, KT Corporation, LG Uplus, NTT Communications, StarHub, Global Transit, Viettel and VNPT. The APG cable system was scheduled to be ready for service in 2016.

In November 2024, a fault was reported on the S8 branch of the APG cable near Thailand, disrupting international connections along that route and affecting Vietnam's international internet capacity. At the time of the report, the cause of the fault was unknown and no repair schedule had been announced.

== Cable landing stations ==
It will have cable landing points at:

- Mainland China (at Chongming and Nanhui)
- Hong Kong (at Tseung Kwan O)
- Japan (at Shima and Shin Maruyama)
- South Korea (at Busan)
- Malaysia (at Kuantan)
- Taiwan (at Toucheng)
- Thailand (at Songkhla)
- Vietnam (at Da Nang)
- Singapore (at East Coast)
