= National Broadcasting and Telecommunications Commission =

Thai broadcast and telecom regulator

Office of The National Broadcasting and Telecommunications Commission
- สำนักงานคณะกรรมการกิจการกระจายเสียง กิจการโทรทัศน์ และกิจการโทรคมนาคมแห่งชาติ
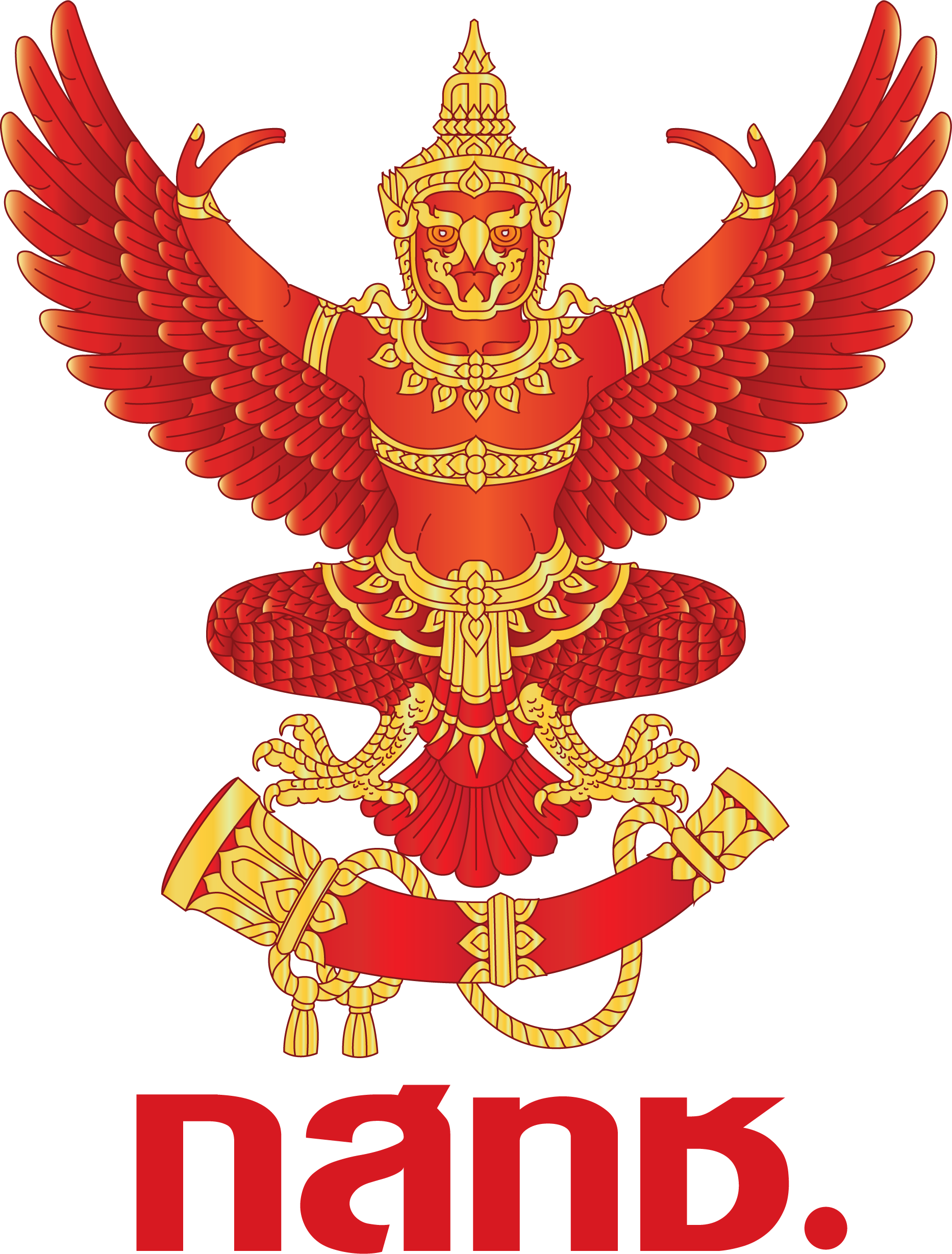

Agency overview
- Formed: 20 December 2010
- Preceding agencies: Post and Telegraph Department (1989-2002); Office of the National Telecommunications Commission (2002-2010)
- Jurisdiction: Kingdom of Thailand
- Headquarters: Bangkok, Thailand
- Website: NBTC

The National Broadcasting and Telecommunications Commission (NBTC, Thai: คณะกรรมการกิจการกระจายเสียง กิจการโทรทัศน์ และกิจการโทรคมนาคมแห่งชาติ), served by its operating body the Office of the NBTC, is an independent regulatory agency of Thailand. It is responsible for overseeing the country's broadcast and telecommunications industries, especially the regulation of radio frequencies.

The origins of the NBTC stem from the 1997 constitution, which envisioned transmission frequencies as a public resource to be regulated by an independent body serving the public interest. Parliamentary acts issued in 2000 in accordance with the constitution called for the creation of a National Telecommunications Commission (NTC) and a National Broadcasting Commission (NBC) to serve the roles. However, the appointment of the commissions was subject to much political manoeuvring, and the NTC had not been established when the 2006 coup repealed the constitution. The 2007 constitution instead called for the creation of a single regulatory agency, and the new Act on Organization to Assign Radio Frequency and to Regulate the Broadcasting and Telecommunication Services, B.E. 2553 was passed in 2010. The first 11-member commission of the NBTC, to serve under terms of six years, was appointed in September 2011, after a lengthy selection process which was subject to much public attention, not least due to the fact that over half of the appointees had military affiliations.

Major events overseen by the NBTC include, among other things, the auction of 3G, 4G and 5G frequency bands and Thailand's digital television transition.

== Censorship ==
In November 2021, the NBTC office led by Lt Gen Peerapong Monakit, an NBTC commissioner, gave a warning to TV operators and concessionaires to reconsider carefully or even refrain from presenting content on some monarchy-related issues from the 2020–2021 Thai protests, in particular the 10-point monarchy reform manifestos. Media outlets viewed the move as a threat, while academics may be reluctant to express opinions on the monarchy for fear of being punished. Analysts said such self-censorship could put all public debate down.

== Controversies and Criticisms ==
The NBTC has faced significant public and legal controversy, particularly concerning its role in market competition, consumer protection, and regulatory independence.

=== Controversial True-DTAC Merger (2022–Present) ===
The commission's handling of the merger between Thai telecommunications companies True Corporation and Total Access Communication (DTAC) was met with widespread opposition and legal challenges from consumer advocates and academics, who warned it would create a near-duopoly in the mobile market.

- Regulatory Approval and Duopoly: In October 2022, the NBTC voted 4-2 to merely "acknowledge" the $8.6 billion merger, allowing it to proceed under specific conditions. The move changed the NBTC from being a regulator to a spectator. The "acknowledgement", effectively reduced the number of mobile network operators from three to two: the merged TRUE-DTAC entity and Advanced Info Service (AIS).
- Legal Challenges and Enforcement Failure: The Thailand's Consumer Council (TCC) filed a high-profile lawsuit (Case No. 2421/2022) against the NBTC, alleging that its decision to approve the merger was unlawful and failed to protect the public interest. Furthermore, the NBTC has been accused of "regulatory slumber" for failing to enforce its own post-merger conditions, such as a mandated service rate reduction and guaranteed network access for Mobile Virtual Network Operators (MVNOs).

=== Systemic Failure in MVNO Regulation (Decade-Long Issue) ===
The NBTC has been accused of a decade-long pattern of regulatory neglect regarding Mobile Virtual Network Operators (MVNOs), a systemic failure that significantly harmed market competition and consumer choice.

- Neglect of Duty Complaint: This systemic failure to enforce MVNO regulations, despite being in place for over ten years, was formally highlighted in May 2025 when MVNO Services Co., Ltd. filed a complaint with the Office of the Ombudsman accusing the NBTC of "persistent and prolonged failure to enforce its own regulations" on network access.
- Collapse of the Sector: Critics cited the regulator's inaction, particularly its failure to enforce the post-merger condition requiring the merged True-DTAC entity to allocate 20% of its network capacity for MVNO use, as the primary cause for the "total collapse of Thailand's MVNO sector" by August 2025, eliminating alternatives for consumers.

=== Criminal Conviction of a Commissioner ===
In a case that generated significant debate over regulatory independence and corporate influence, NBTC Commissioner Pirongrong Ramasoota was convicted of dereliction of duty.

- The Charge: In February 2025, the Central Criminal Court for Corruption and Misconduct Cases sentenced Pirongrong to two years in prison without suspension after finding her guilty of intentionally seeking to harm True Digital Group (a subsidiary of True Corporation) by improperly exercising her official duties.
- Dispute Context: The case stemmed from Pirongrong's order to issue a warning to 127 broadcasters over the platform’s practice of inserting advertisements into free-to-air TV content, which she maintained was done to protect consumers and uphold "must-carry" principles.
- Implications: The ruling sparked concern among academics and civil society groups, who viewed the conviction as a potential threat to consumer protection, an attempt to pressure independent regulators, and evidence of growing corporate influence over media governance. Pirongrong was one of the two commissioners who had opposed the True-DTAC merger.

=== 2022 FIFA World Cup Broadcast Fiasco ===
The NBTC faced heavy criticism for its role in securing the broadcasting rights for the 2022 FIFA World Cup.

- Fund Allocation and Must-Have Rule: The commission voted to allocate 600 million baht from its Universal Service Obligation (USO) fund to the Sports Authority of Thailand (SAT) to help purchase the rights, which cost 1.4 billion baht in total, to ensure the event was broadcast free-to-air under the "Must-Have" rule. This use of the fund was criticized by academics and some commissioners, who questioned the legal mandate for using public funds for commercial sports rights.
- Secretary-General Removal: In June 2023, the NBTC board voted to remove its acting secretary-general, Trairat Viriyasirikul, over the fiasco. The commission established a disciplinary investigation against him for allegedly violating regulations by discussing the budget proposal with SAT before proper internal approval. The dismissal subsequently led to a lawsuit by the former secretary-general against the commissioners, though the NBTC commissioners were later acquitted by the Central Criminal Court for Corruption and Misconduct Cases in 2025.

=== Sexual Misconduct Controversy at Staff Conference ===
In September 2025, the NBTC faced a controversy involving sexual misconduct by an advisor during an official staff seminar.

- Misconduct and Investigation: A Senator revealed that "an NBTC advisor allegedly sexually harassed a female employee" during a conference held in Phuket. The matter was initially suppressed, and the advisor resigned in an attempt to close the issue. However, the victim's family refused to let the matter drop. The Acting Secretary-General of the NBTC confirmed that an investigation committee had been established to probe the incident.

=== Neglect During Natural Disasters (Hat Yai Flood) ===
The NBTC was heavily criticized for its failure to ensure communication services during the major flood disaster in Hat Yai, Songkhla Province.

- Communication Failure: During the November 2025 floods, citizens experienced a complete phone and internet signal outage for several days. A Senate committee vice-chairman disclosed that the communication failure made it impossible for victims trapped in their homes to call for help from government agencies or relatives, which was cited by affected citizens as contributing to a high number of fatalities (reported as over 100).
- Regulatory Carelessness: The NBTC was publicly criticized for failing to develop or implement an emergency plan, and for neglecting to deploy necessary resources like mobile signal transmission vehicles (*mobile unit*) during the crisis. This inaction led to accusations that the NBTC was leaving the public "to fate" and acting as if the disaster were "normal" without any lessons learned from past emergency situations.

=== Controversies Surrounding the NBTC Chairman ===
The tenure of NBTC Chairman Dr. Sarana Boonbaichaiyapruck, a clinical professor and cardiologist by profession, has been marked by accusations of conflicts of interest, alleged misuse of funds, and a leadership style that led to internal legal battles.

- Conflict of Interest and Dual Employment Claim: The Chairman faced controversy over claims he was actively engaged in his medical profession, thereby neglecting his full-time duties as NBTC Chairman. A Move Forward Party MP accused Dr. Sarana of using NBTC funds and time for over 120 days of overseas trips to the United States over a 16-month period, potentially to supervise a US medical clinic he allegedly ran. The MP argued that using the Chairman position as a "part-time job" while practicing medicine constituted a significant conflict of interest. The Chairman denied the claims, stating that the clinic references found online referred to a "person with a similar name" and that his US medical license had expired decades ago.
- Legal Qualification Dispute: The controversy extended to Dr. Sarana's legal eligibility, with the Commission on Information Technology of the Senate and the Consumer Council of Thailand (TCC) formally challenging his right to hold the position. Critics alleged his continued or prior employment status at Mahidol University's Faculty of Medicine violated the prohibited criteria set by the Frequency Allocation Organization Act of 2010. They argued that if he was found to lack qualifications, all votes he cast, including the one for the controversial True-DTAC merger, could be rendered void. Mahidol University, however, officially reported that he was only working as a "volunteer physician" (without compensation) or a "fee-for-service doctor," arguing this status did not violate the law.
- Internal Conflict and Judicial Setbacks: The Chairman was at the center of a severe governance crisis over the recruitment of a new Secretary-General (the NBTC's top administrative post). The Chairman's process for selecting the new Secretary-General was challenged by four of the seven commissioners, who voted to reject his nomination and selection method, arguing the process was invalid and improperly driven by the Chairman. In June 2025, the Administrative Court ruled the NBTC's selection process for the Secretary-General illegal, concluding that the appointment was the responsibility of the entire board, not just the chairman, and ordered the process to restart.
- Centralizing Power and Regulatory Delays: An NBTC Commissioner publicly blamed the Chairman for the delayed or absent SMS alert messages during an earthquake, suggesting the failure to warn the public was due to the Chairman's practice of centralizing power to himself, which inhibited swift coordination between the NBTC Office and mobile operators.

== See also ==
- Telecommunications in Thailand
