= XOX =

Malaysian telecommunications company

XOX Malaysia
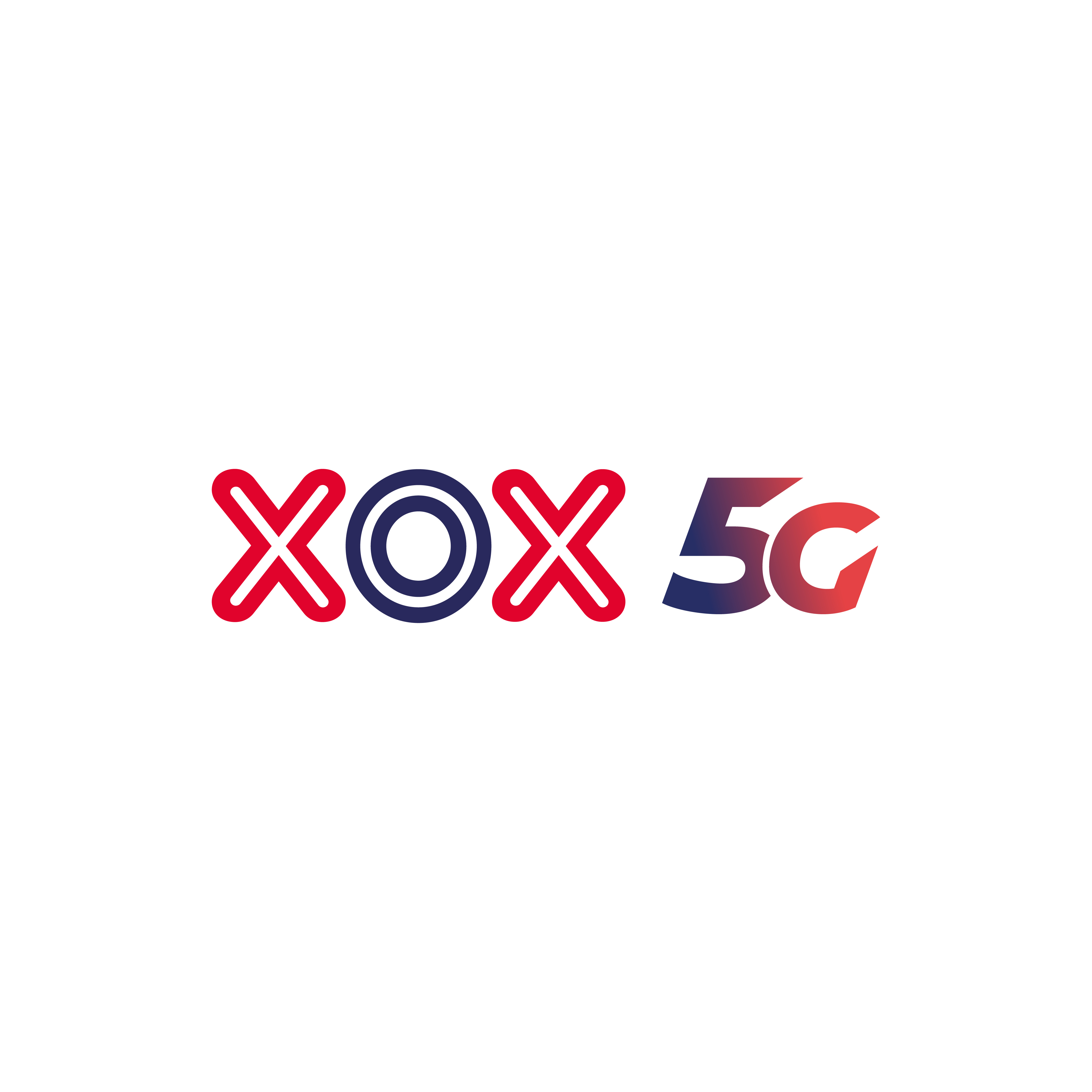
- Company type: Publicly traded company
- Traded as: MYX: 0165
- Industry: Telecommunication
- Founded: 2004
- Headquarters: Petaling Jaya
- Area served: International
- Key people: Datuk Kenneth Vun (Managing Director)
- Products: Mobile telecommunications
- Website: xox.com.my

Launched in 2005, XOX BHD (previously known as XOX MOBILE) is a Malaysian technology corporation.

The company began as a telecommunication company and launched its first prepaid SIM card in 2009, and was the first Malaysian Mobile Virtual Network Operator (MVNO) to be listed on Bursa Malaysia in 2011. Currently their mobile services are marketed under ONEXOX brand and has approximately 2.5 million subscribers.

== History ==
=== Telecommunication ===
In January 2009, XOX launched its first prepaid SIM card. A Hybrid Plan was introduced in the second half of 2010. In 2012, XOX launched its SIM-FREE subscription plan which was followed by the #PrepaidPlus plan known as XOX-Voopee in 2013. In April 2016, the plan was then discontinued and was replaced by ONEXOX Prepaid as part of the efforts to consolidate product divisions. In 2013, XOX was appointed by the Penang State Government Information Division as the official Mobile Technology partner. A year later, the Badminton Association Malaysia (BAM) appointed XOX as its official Mobile Technology Partner. The brand launched 'XOX-Voopee' SIM-FREE subscription plan in 2012 followed by the launching of #prepaidplus in 2013, which was replaced with ONEXOX prepaid as part of product consolidation.

In 2014, XOX was signed as the official Mobile Technology partner for Badminton Association Malaysia (BAM). The brand then launched "Season Pass" in the same year. In February 2016, XOX signed badminton player Dato Lee Chong Wei as its ambassador. XOX partnered with Galaxy to bring in entertainment. such as Hong Kong singer Eason Chan In April, XOX announced its collaboration with Johor Southern Tigers (JST), and the brand launched a limited edition to keep fan clubs updated.

=== ONEXOX BLACK and XOX eSIM ===
From 2017 to 2019, XOX developed and launched ONEXOX BLACK and XOX eSIM. All new products include XOX exclusive feature called #BURNPROOF, which automatically carries forward unused data, minutes and SMS and no forfeiting.

In 2018, XOX expanded its regional operations by having a joint venture agreement with Perkumpulan Nahdlatul Ulama (PBNU), EH Integrated Systems Sdn Bhd and PT Nusantara Digital Telekomunikasi. The new company, known as PT Nusantara Mobile Telecommunication, focuses on telecommunication services, mobile application and e-wallet.

In 2019, XOX launched Malaysia's first fully digitized XOX eSIM, an embedded SIM technology.

== Marketing and activities ==
XOX FA Cup Final 2015

XOX was title sponsor of the 2015 Football Association of Malaysia FA Cup.

Malaysian Cub Prix

XOX has been one of the main sponsor for Malaysian Cub Prix from 2017. It is an effort to nurture young Malaysian talented riders to future world champions.

2019 ONEXOX TKKR SAG Team

XOX made a partnership with ONEXOX TKKR SAG Team, a Malaysian-Spanish motorcycle racing team competing in Malaysian Cub Prix, FIM ARRC, FIM CEV Repsol and FIM Moto2.

== Awards ==
- 2013: SME Blue Chip Award – MVNO
- 2013: Master Class Awards - Emerging Telco of the Year in BrandLaureate Award
- 2013 - 2015: Malaysia’s 100 Top Brands
- 2016 & 2022 - 2023: The BrandLaureate President’s Award
- 2018 & 2021: Star Rating Awards
- 2018: Mobile Business Excellence Award (Best Telco of the Year – Best Data Package for Business Plan and Company of the Year)
- 2019: Best MVNO - PC.com Best Product Award
- 2021: Best Mobile Virtual Network Operator (“MVNO”) 2021” at MCMC’s Star Rating Award (SRA) by Deputy Minister of Communications & Digital YB Teo Nie Ching
- 2023: “Most Affordable Postpaid & Prepaid Telco Brand” Award by The BrandLaureate
- 2024: Best Customer Service Award - Malaysia Direct Distribution Association (MDDA)
