= TOT Public Company Limited =

Thai telecommunications company

- Corporate logo

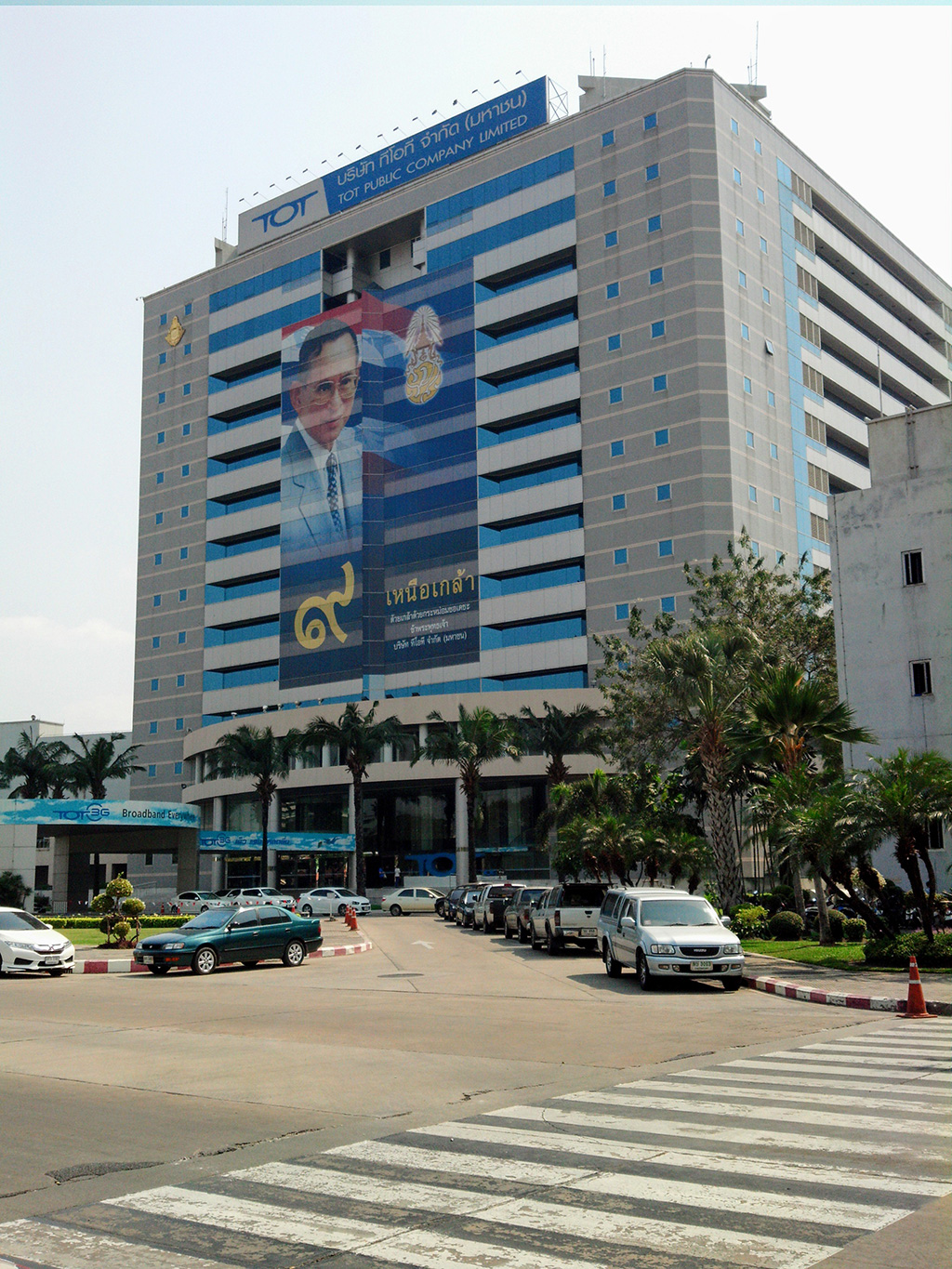
- TOT Headquarters in Bangkok (2015)
- Trade name: TOT
- Native name: บริษัท ทีโอที จำกัด (มหาชน)
- Type: State-owned enterprise
- Industry: Telecommunications
- Genre: Public limited company
- Predecessor: Telephone Organization of Thailand; TOT Corporation
- Founded: February 24, 1954; 72 years ago
- Founder: Government of Thailand
- Defunct: January 7, 2021
- Fate: Merged with CAT Telecom
- Successor: National Telecom
- Headquarters: 89/2 Chaeng Watthana Road, Lak Si, Bangkok, Thailand
- Number of locations: 3 Metropolitan Sales and Service Offices; 6 Regional Sales and Service Offices
- Area served: Thailand
- Key people: AVM Somsak Khaosuwan (Chairman); Morakot Thienmontree (Acting President)
- Products: Internet; Telephone; Leased lines
- Production output: 1,565,446 Ports (2020)
- Brands: IPTV; TOT Cloud App
- Services: Infrastructure; Fixed-line; Broadband; Digital; Telecom towers
- Revenue: ▼ ฿58.477 billion (2020)
- Operating income: ▼ ฿54.749 billion (2020)
- Net income: ▼ ฿657 million (2020)
- Total assets: ▲ ฿148.147 billion (2020)
- Total equity: ▼ ฿108.882 billion (2020)
- Owner: Ministry of Finance (100%)
- Number of employees: 17,293 (2020)
- Parent: Ministry of Digital Economy and Society
- Website: www.tot.co.th

TOT Public Company Limited (Thai: บริษัท ทีโอที จำกัด (มหาชน) or ทีโอที) is a Thai state-owned telecommunications company. Originally established in 1954 and corporatized in 2002, TOT used to be known as the Telephone Organization of Thailand (Thai: องค์การโทรศัพท์แห่งประเทศไทย, romanized: Ongkan thorasap haeng prathet Thai) and TOT Corporation Public Company Limited. TOT's main line of business is fixed line telephony, internet, although it has several other businesses, including mobile telephony. Since 2021, TOT PCL become National Telecom Public Company Limited after merger with CAT Telecom.

== Early history ==
The first use of the telephone in Thailand began during the reign of King Rama V in 1881 with a telephone line constructed between Bangkok, and Paknam, in Samut Prakan, a short distance south of Bangkok along the Chao Phraya River. Its purpose was to inform Bangkok of the arrival and departure of ships at Paknam.

The Telephone Organization of Thailand was founded by the Thai government on 24 February 1954. A state enterprise under the Ministry of Transport and Communications, it incorporated the Telephone Technician Unit under the Post and Telegraph Department. It originally had 732 staff members and a budget of 50 million baht. The TOT provided telephone services in the Bangkok metropolis, which included Wat Lieb, Bang Rak, Ploenchit, and Sam Sen Exchanges.

TOT was transformed from a state-owned enterprise under the control of the Transport and Communication Ministry to a public company named TOT Corporation PCL. on 31 July 2002.

== Corporate status change and the aftermath of the 2006 coup ==
Under the deposed government of Thaksin Shinawatra (2001–2006), TOT became a corporation and plans were under way to privatise a portion of the state enterprise through an IPO on the Stock Exchange of Thailand. These plans were cancelled after the Thaksin government was overthrown by a coup on 19 September 2006. Soon after the coup, the junta of General Surayud Chulanont announced plans to merge TOT with rival state telecom enterprise CAT Telecom (formerly the Communications Authority of Thailand).

The junta also appointed junta assistant secretary-general General Saprang Kalayanamitr as the new chairman of the board of directors of TOT. General Saprang's first move as TOT chairman was to hand-pick three Army colonels and controversial Thaksin-critic Vuthiphong Priebjrivat to sit on the state enterprise's board of directors.

The junta cancelled the Thaksin government's telecom excise tax policy. The Thaksin government had imposed an excise tax on privately offered fixed and cellular services, and then allowed telecom companies to deduct the amount they paid in excise tax from concession fees they had to pay to state concession owners TOT and CAT Telecom. The amount paid by the private telecom firms did not change. The Surayud government's excise tax cancellation meant that TOT and CAT Telecom would receive their full concession payments. However, TOT and CAT were then forced to increase their dividends to the Ministry of Finance to account for their increased income.

In December 2009, TOT became Thailand's first 3G mobile phone service provider, launching 3G mobile phone service (Phase 1) via the brand TOT3G, by enhancing 584 base stations in Bangkok and its vicinity to accommodate 500,000 numbers for the service and with a goal of nationwide coverage by the end of 2011.

== Restructuring plan ==
In August 2014, TOT was ordered by the State Enterprise Policy Commission to submit a proposal that would wind down non-core businesses, allowing it to reduce costs. Known in Thailand as the "superboard", the commission was established by Thailand's National Council for Peace and Order (NCPO) and tasked with assessing the operations of state enterprises. TOT restructuring plan includes splitting into six subsidiary operations that would then partner with private firms.

TOT plans to streamline its business into the following six key areas:

- Telecoms infrastructure
- Towers
- Broadband
- Mobile wholesale
- ICT and cloud
- International gateway/submarine cable

TOT announced its intention to upgrade its business, through public–private partnership (PPP) and commercial agreements with third-party companies. Among the companies that have expressed interest in a partnership with TOT are:

- Advanced Info Service (AIS)
- MVNE One Development
- Softbank (Softbank Corporation)
- Loxley Pcl.
- MobileLTE

On 7 January 2021, TOT PCL agreed to merge with CAT Telecom into a new company, National Telecom Public Company Limited (NT) according to the cabinet resolution by Ministry of Digital Economy and Society under Prime Minister Prayut Chan-o-cha.

== Mobile Virtual Network Operator Host ==
TOT is also a host network operator, who hosts Mobile virtual network operator (MVNOs).

As of January 2017, TOT had two MVNOs operating on its network:

- i-Kool 3G (Loxley)
- IEC3G - Renamed to Tron IEC3G As of 25 March 2014

By the end of 2016 the MVNO's and TOT itself, had a combined market share of 0.18% representing 163,658 subscribers out of a total market size of 90,921,572.

In January 2017, TOT's financial statement reported total revenue of THB 30.8 billion in 2016, Ebitda of THB 1.6 billion, and a Net Loss of THB 5.8 billion.
