= National Telecom =

Thai state-owned telecom company

National Telecom Public Company Limited
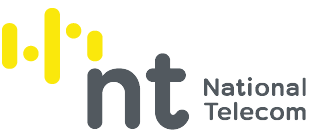

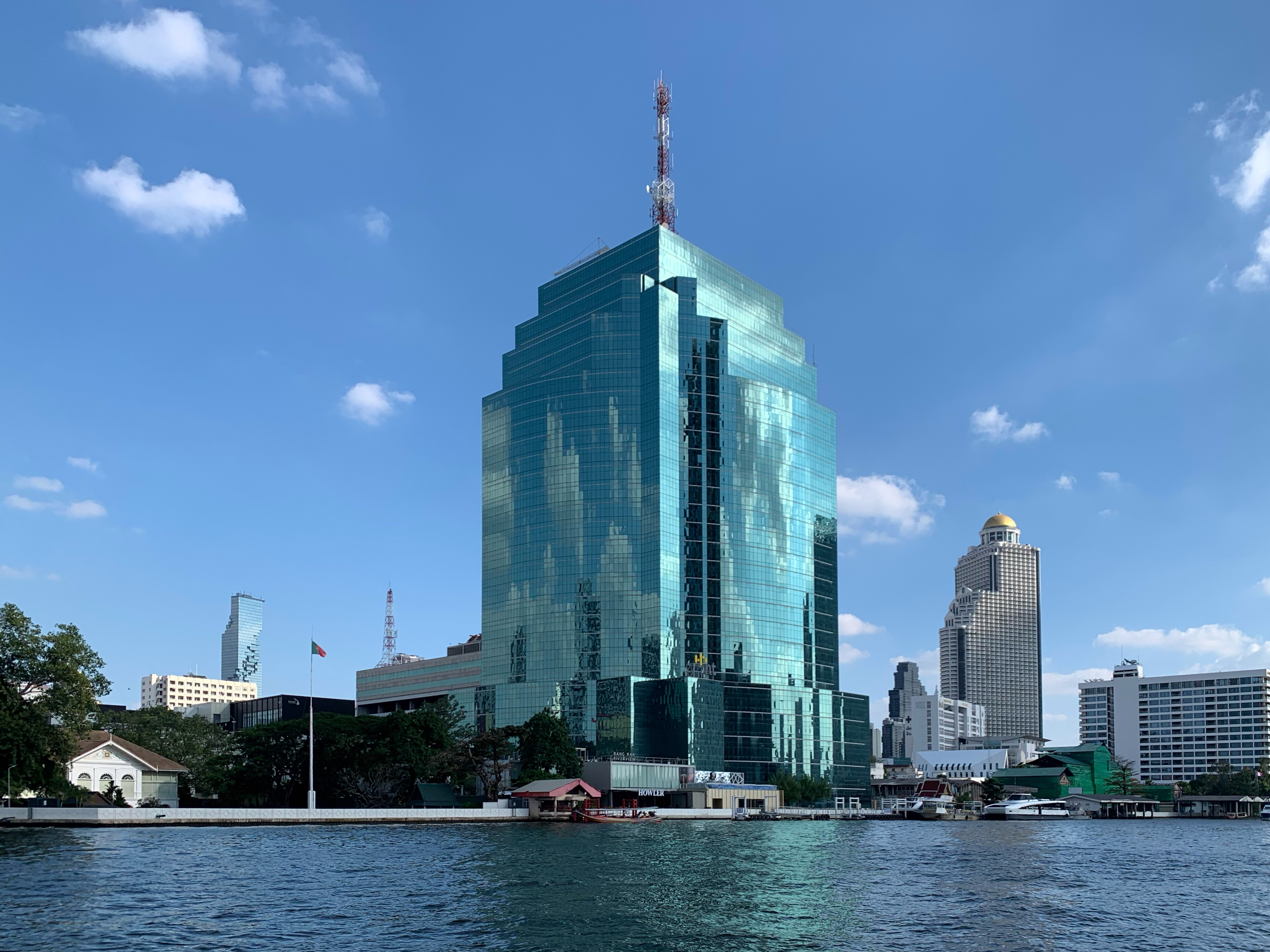
- NT Tower Bang Rak, Bangkok, former office of CAT
- Native name: บริษัท โทรคมนาคมแห่งชาติ จำกัด (มหาชน)
- Company type: Public State-owned
- Industry: Telecommunications
- Predecessor: CAT Telecom; TOT Public Company Limited
- Founded: 7 January 2021; 5 years ago
- Headquarters: Bangkok, Thailand
- Area served: Thailand
- Key people: Colonel Sapachai Huvanandana (President)
- Products: Mobile telephony; Wireless broadband services; International gateways; Satellite; Submarine cable networks
- Owner: Ministry of Digital Economy and Society
- Website: Official website

National Telecom Public Company Limited (NT) (บริษัท โทรคมนาคมแห่งชาติ จำกัด (มหาชน)) is a Thai state-owned telecommunications company. Established and corporatized in 2021 by resulting from the merger of CAT Telecom and TOT Public Company Limited. NT's main line of business is fixed line telephony, mobile telephony, international telecommunications infrastructure, including its international gateways, satellite, and submarine cable networks connections.

Its office on Chaeng Watthana Road is located next to, and being the namesake of National Telecom MRT station.

== Early history ==
On 1 September 2020, the Cabinet passed a resolution acknowledging the progress of the merger and the use of the new company name resulting from the merger is National Telecom Public Company Limited; NT PCL. Later, on 18 December 2020, Puttipong Punnakanta, Minister of Digital Economy and Society, held a meeting with employees and state enterprise labor unions of both TOT and CAT Telecom to communicate the organization's drive to be in the same direction. This included communicating accurate information to employees and/or asking questions about the merger to lead to the creation of a new organization.

Later, on 7 January 2021, the Ministry of Finance as a total shareholder of both TOT, CAT Telecom, and NT PCL., approved the merger between TOT and CAT Telecom to become the National Telecommunications PCL. (NT) with a registered capital of 16,000 million baht. Subsequently, both TOT and CAT Telecom went to register for the establishment of NT PCL. at the Department of Business Development, Ministry of Commerce, and Puttipong Punnakanta was the chairman of the press conference on the official launch of NT PCL. Completing the merger of TOT and CAT Telecom.

After the merger and established as NT PCL., has set up a committee to act as the first official set with Mom Luang Chayothit Kritdakorn as the chairman of the board and Gp.Capt. Somsak Khaosuwan, as acting president. In addition, National Telecom has set a goal to compete with the private sector to become one of the top 3 telecommunication providers in Thailand.
