= CAT Telecom =

Thai telecommunications company

CAT Telecom Public Company Limited
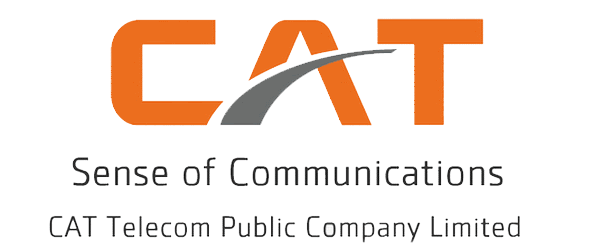

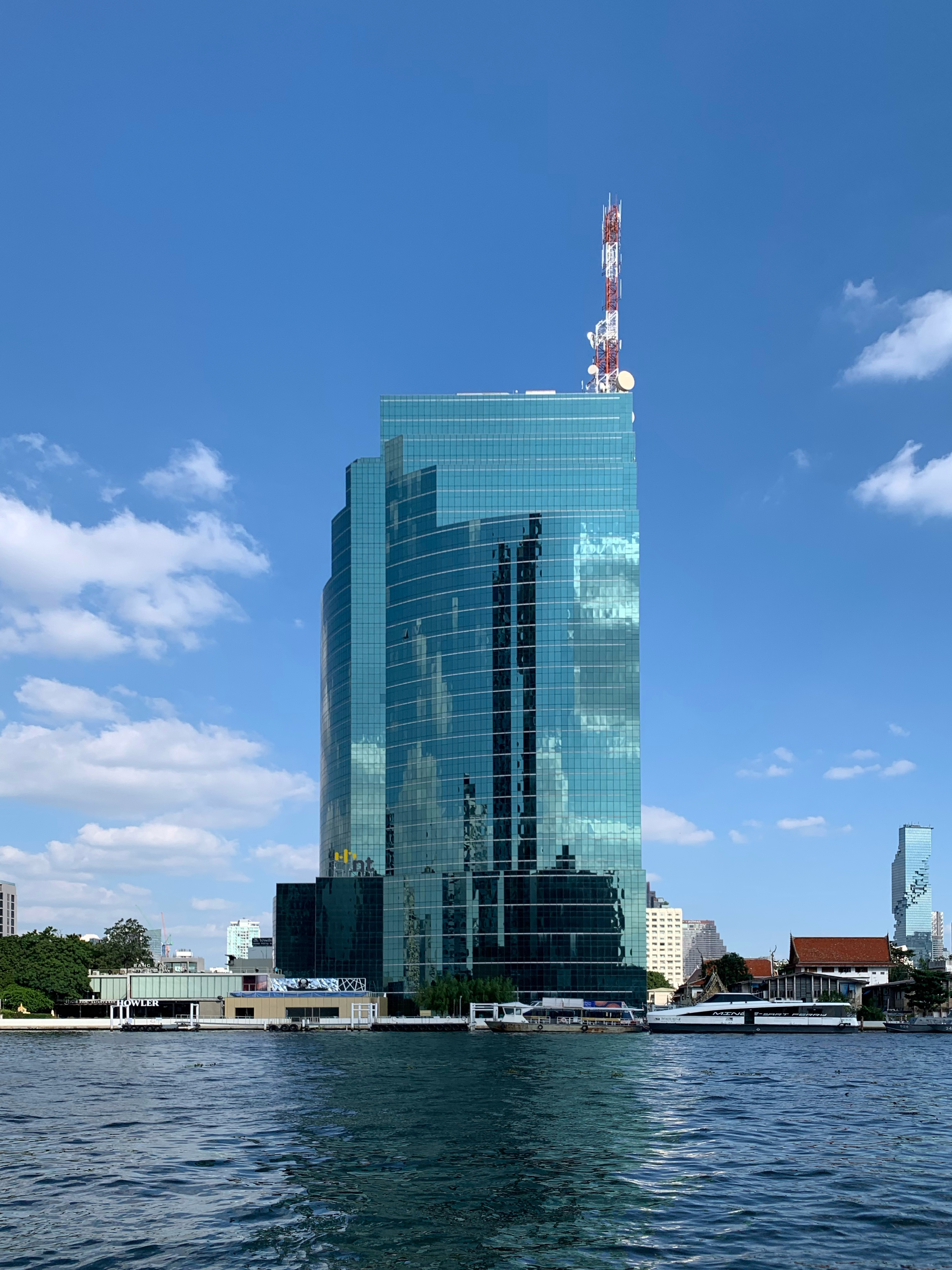
- CAT Tower, the CAT Telecom’s Headquarter, located by the Chao Phraya River, Bangrak District, Bangkok
- Native name: บริษัท กสท โทรคมนาคม จำกัด (มหาชน)
- Company type: State-owned
- Industry: Telecommunication
- Founded: 14 August 2003
- Defunct: 6 January 2021
- Successor: National Telecom Public Company Limited
- Headquarters: Bangkok, Thailand
- Area served: Thailand
- Website: www.cattelecom.com

CAT Telecom Public Company Limited (Thai: บริษัท กสท โทรคมนาคม จำกัด (มหาชน); abbreviation of Communication Authority of Thailand (การสื่อสารแห่งประเทศไทย)), was a state-owned company that ran Thailand’s international telecommunications infrastructure, including its international gateways, satellite, and submarine cable networks connections. Since 2021 CAT Telecom became the National Telecom Public Company Limited after merging with TOT Public Company Limited.

== Services ==
Until recently, CAT had a monopoly on international telephony and CDMA mobile telephony. CAT partnered with TOT to provide the GSM mobile service Thai Mobile. In partnership with Hutchison, it provided a CDMA2000 1x mobile service in 25 central provinces and operated its own CDMA2000 1xEV-DO in 51 provinces.

CAT provides data communications and applications services, such as leased line, Fiber-to-the-Premises, Gigabit Ethernet, xDSL, live TV broadcast, e-Commerce, e-Auction, and e-Security.

== History ==
CAT Telecom Public Company Limited (Thailand) was established on August 14, 2003, by the government of Prime Minister Thaksin Shinawatra. Plans were under way to privatize a portion of the state enterprise through an IPO in the Stock Exchange of Thailand but these plans were cancelled after the Thaksin government was overthrown by a coup on 19 September 2006. Soon after the coup, the junta of General Surayud Chulanont announced plans to merge CAT with rival state telecom enterprise TOT (Telephone Organization of Thailand).

Before 2003, CAT was an abbreviation for Communications Authority of Thailand, a Thai government agency. Despite not having been privatized, CAT was still made into a state-owned enterprise (though without the IPO to Stock Exchange of Thailand). It became a public company (with 100% of shares held by the Thai government) with its name CAT, where CAT is no longer an abbreviation for the Communications Authority of Thailand. Any telecommunication regulation was transferred to the National Broadcasting and Telecommunications Commission (NBTC).

The junta appointed General Saprang Kalayanamitr as the new chairman of the board of directors for both CAT and TOT. Saprang was accused by the founders of PTV, a new satellite television station, of being behind CAT's refusal to grant an internet link from Bangkok to a satellite up-link station in Hong Kong. PTV was established by some previous executives of the Thai Rak Thai party. CAT, however, claimed that it never received PTV's application for internet access.

The junta also canceled the Thaksin government's telecom excise tax policy. The Thaksin government imposed an excise tax on private fixed and cellular services, and then allowed telecom companies to deduct the amount they paid in excise tax from concession fees to TOT and CAT. The total amount paid by the private telecom firms did not change. The Surayud government's excise tax cancellation meant that TOT and CAT would receive their full concession payments. However, TOT and CAT were then forced to increase their dividends to the Ministry of Finance to account for their increased income.

On 30 November 2013, during the mass protests going on in Bangkok, a group of unidentified protesters infiltrated CAT's headquarter, which hosted its data center, to cut off its electricity. This affected roughly 92,000 clients of the company and resulted in about 300 million baht ($10 million) in lost transactions. Upon the system shut down, internet was inaccessible, phone lines were down, and ATMs were out of service.

CAT is a network operator that hosts mobile virtual network operators (MVNO). CAT has two MVNOs operating on its 850 MHz network:

- Truemove H, a subsidiary of True Corporation
- 168, formerly known as 365 3G Communications

On 7 January 2021, CAT Telecom agreed to merge with TOT Public Company Limited into a new company, National Telecom Public Company Limited (NT) according to the cabinet resolution by Ministry of Digital Economy and Society under Prime Minister Prayut Chan-o-cha.

== Subsidiaries ==
My By CAT, a mobile phone operator

CAT includes the following subsidiaries:

- My By CAT (mobile phone operator)
- CAT Internet
- CAT cyfence

== Coverage ==
MybyCAT services are available in the following provinces:

- Bangkok
- Ang Thong Province
- Kanchanaburi Province
- Chanthaburi Province
- Chachoengsao Province
- Chonburi Province
- Trat Province
- Nakhon Nayok Province
- Nakhon Pathom Province
- Nonthaburi Province
- Pathum Thani Province
- Prachuap Khiri Khan Province
- Prachinburi Province
- Phra Nakhon Si Ayutthaya Province
- Phetchaburi Province
- Rayong Province
- Ratchaburi Province
- Lopburi Province
- Samut Prakan Province
- Samut Sakhon Province
- Samut Songkhram Province
- Sa Kaeo Province
- Saraburi Province
- Sing Buri Province
- Suphan Buri Province
- Kalasin Province
