= List of Thais by net worth =

This is a list of Thai billionaires based on an annual assessment of wealth and assets compiled and published by Forbes magazine.

== Top 25 richest Thai ==
According to Forbes, as of March 2024, the 25 wealthiest individuals in Thailand are as follows:

Global rank	'23 rank	Name	Net worth in \// billion US$	Source of wealth	Citizenship
159 ▼	116	Dhanin Chearavanont	12.5 billion	Charoen Pokphand Group	Thailand
177 ▼	118	Charoen Sirivadhanabhakdi	11.3 billion	ThaiBev, real estate	Thailand
200 ▼	141	Sarath Ratanavadi	10.7 billion	Gulf Energy Development	Thailand
548 ▼	425	Sumet Jiaravanon	5.5 billion	Charoen Pokphand Group	Thailand
563 ▼	437	Jaran Chiaravanont	5.4 billion	Charoen Pokphand Group	Thailand
835 ▼	721	Vanich Chaiyawan	3.8 billion	Thai Life Insurance, beverages	Thailand
871 ▲	818	Prasert Prasarttong-Osoth	3.7 billion	Bangkok Dusit Medical Services	Thailand
1062 ▼	721	Somurai Jaruphnit	3.1 billion	Charoen Pokphand Group	Thailand
1496 ▼	1217	Prayudh Mahagitsiri	2.2 billion	coffee, shipping	Thailand
1545 ▼	1368	Harald Link	2.1 billion	B.Grimm	Thailand
1545	1434	Thaksin Shinawatra	2.1 billion	investments	Thailand; Montenegro
1545 ▲	1516	Wichai Thongtang	2.1 billion	Bangkok Dusit Medical Services	Thailand
1764 ▼	1575	Manas Chiaravanond	1.8 billion	Charoen Pokphand Group	Thailand
1764 ▼	1516	Phongthep Chiaravanont	1.8 billion	Charoen Pokphand Group	Thailand
1764 ▼	1575	Prathip Chiravanond	1.8 billion	Charoen Pokphand Group	Thailand
1764 ▼	1575	Somsri Lamsam	1.8 billion	Charoen Pokphand Group	Thailand
1764 ▲	1804	Sathien Sathientham	1.8 billion	Carabao Group	Thailand
1851	1725	William Heinecke	1.7 billion	Minor International	Thailand
1945 ▼	852	Somphote Ahunai	1.6 billion	Energy Absolute	Thailand
2046 ▼	1647	Krit Ratanarak	1.5 billion	Bangkok Broadcasting & TV, real estate	Thailand
2287	2133	Pongsak Viddayakorn	1.3 billion	Bangkok Dusit Medical Services	Thailand
2410 ▼	1725	Keeree Kanjanapas	1.2 billion	BTS Group Holdings	Thailand
2410	2259	Thongma Vijitpongpun	1.2 billion	Pruksa Real Estate	Thailand
2545 ▼	2133	Anant Asavabhokhin	1.1 billion	Land and Houses	Thailand
2545 ▼	2020	Niti Osathanugrah	1.1 billion	Osotspa	Thailand
2545 ▼	1905	Prachak Tangkaravakoon	1.1 billion	TOA Paint (Thailand)	Thailand

== See also ==
- The World's Billionaires
- List of countries by the number of billionaires
