= Suphachai Chearavanont =

Thai businessman (born 1967)

- ศุภชัย เจียรวนนท์ 謝榕仁
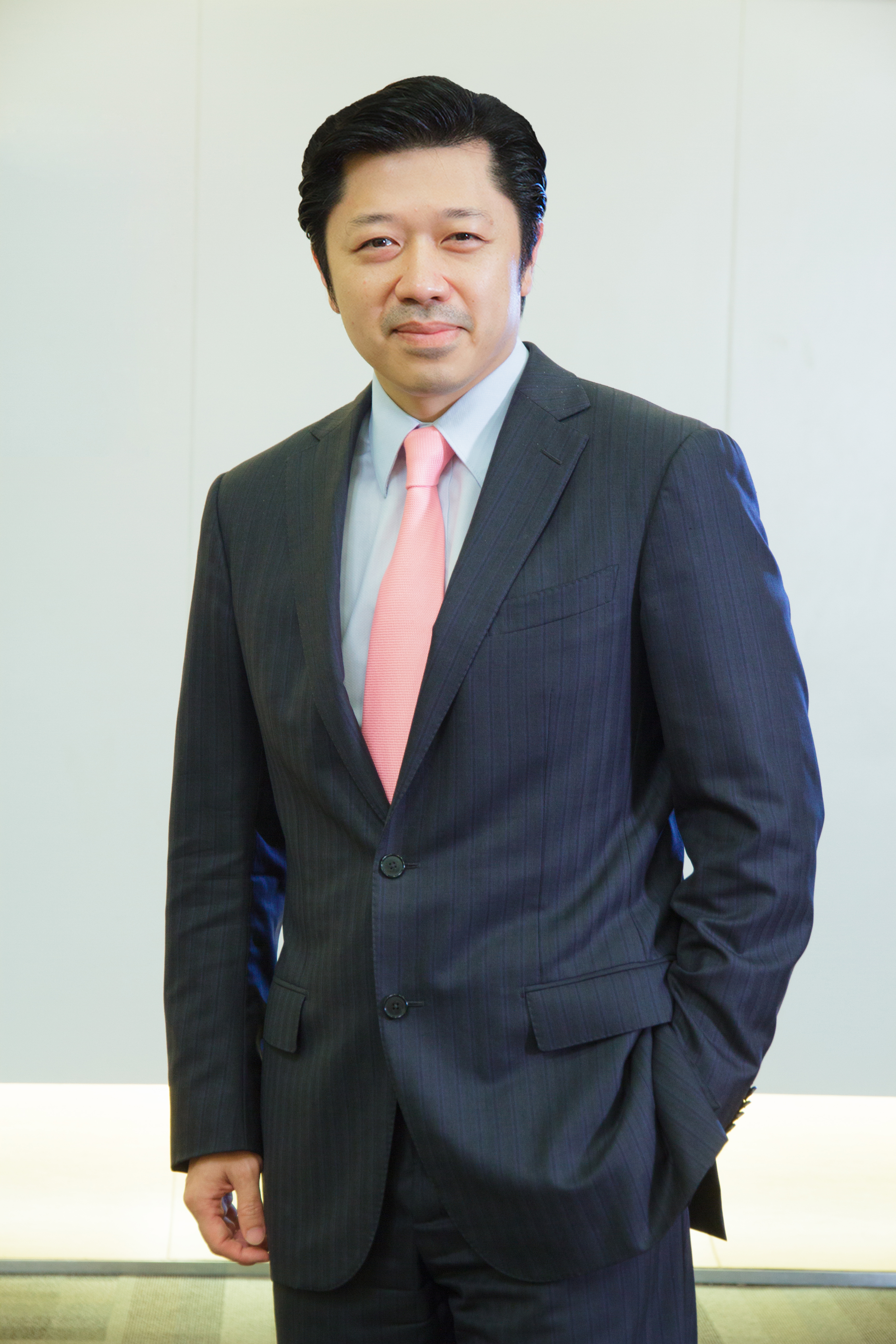
- Born: March 24, 1967 (age 59); Bangkok, Thailand
- Other name: Nai
- Education: Boston University (BBA)
- Occupation: Businessman
- Years active: 1989–present
- Title: Chairman and CEO of Arise Ventures Group Company Limited; Senior Vice Chairman of Charoen Pokphand Group; Chairman of True Corporation; Vice Chairman of Charoen Pokphand Foods; Vice Chairman of CP All; Chairman of CP Axtra
- Children: 3, including Korawad
- Father: Dhanin Chearavanont
- Family: Chearavanont family

Suphachai Chearavanont (Thai: ศุภชัย เจียรวนนท์; RTGS: Suphachai Chiarawanon; Chinese: 謝榕仁; born 24 March 1967) is a Thai businessman. He is the founder, chairman, and CEO of Arise Ventures Group Company Limited, Senior Vice Chairman of Charoen Pokphand Group, Chairman of telecommunications company True Corporation, Vice Chairman of Charoen Pokphand Foods and CP ALL, and Chairman of CP Axtra.

Chairperson of United Nations Global Compact Network Thailand., Chairman of the Council of Digital Economy and Society in Thailand Advisor of the Thai Chamber of Commerce Chairperson of Office for National Education Standards and Quality Assessment (Public Organization), Chairman and Founder of Ascend Money, Chairman and Founder of True IDC, Founder of True Digital Park., Chairman and Founder of the ConnextED Foundation, a public-private partnership initiative to reform education in Thailand., Chairman and Founder of Plookpanya Foundation, which promotes education and the teaching of Buddhist philosophy., Senior Chairman and co-founder of the Digital Council of Thailand. Global Advisory Board of One Young World

== Early life and education ==
Suphachai Chearavanont was born in 1967 in Thailand to businessman Dhanin Chearavanont and Tewee Chearavanont. Raised in Thailand, he has two sisters and two older brothers. His father is known as the owner of Charoen Pokphand (C.P. Group), an international conglomerate that became the first foreign company to invest in China after borders opened in 1978. At the age of eight, Chearavanont spent a year in Taiwan studying Chinese.

He graduated secondary school at Assumption College and attended Boston University in the United States, where he graduated with a bachelor's degree in business administration with a focus on financial management. In 2016 he received an honorary doctorate in mass communications from Ramkhamhaeng University, and he also has an honorary doctorate in business administration from Khon Kaen University.

== Career ==
=== 1989-1998: Early positions ===
After graduating from Boston University, Chearavanont spent time as an intern at a petrochemical factory in Houston, Texas. On his return to Thailand, in 1989 he worked at Siam Makro (now known as CP Axtra), a C.P. Group subsidiary. Chearavanont in 1990 worked at Soltext Federal Credit Union in the United States, and in 1991 and 1992 he was employed at Vinylthai, a Thai petrochemical company.

In 1992 he joined TelecomAsia Corporation, Thailand's largest telecommunication company and a subsidiary of C.P. Group. Initially a senior officer in the president's office, he was named VP of the Operation Room in 1993 and senior VP of Planning and Project Coordination & Support in 1994. After becoming a managing director of TelecomAsia in 1995, that year TelecomAsia named him general manager of its eastern region. Also in 1995 he was chief operations officer (COO) of UTV Cable Network, becoming the subsidiary's president in 1996 when it was renamed Asia Multimedia. TelecomAsia appointed him executive VP of business operations in 1996, then senior executive VP in 1997. TelecomAsia was negatively affected by the 1997 Asian financial crisis, with its debt reaching record levels after the depreciation of the Thai baht by 50% that year. Seeking to avoid bankruptcy, Chearavanont is credited with pitching TelecomAsia's growing fixed-line phone business and future prospects to investors, securing a debt restructuring plan.

=== 1999-2005: TelecomAsia CEO ===
Chearvanont was named president and CEO of TelecomAsia in 1999, also becoming chairman of the subsidiary Wire & Wireless. He became an executive director of CP Lotus, a subsidiary of C.P. Group, in 2000, and 2001 he became chairman of Pantavanij Company. In May 2002 Chearavanont was also appointed the co-CEO of TA Orange, a wireless joint venture between TelecomAsia and France Télécom. After managerial disagreements on marketing for the Thai market, in May 2003 France Telecom began divesting of its foreign ventures, including TA Orange. Chearavanont "staged a buyback," with France Telecom ultimately selling all but 10% of its stake back to TelecomAsia in March 2004. Afterwards Chearavanont continued to invest in TA Orange to increase its network size, renaming TA Orange TrueMove. As part of the buyback, Chearavanont also rebranded TelecomAsia as True Corporation, expanding into "mobile, fixed-line phones, broadband and pay TV services." During his tenure as president and CEO, he pioneered the Chearavanont's family entry into the telecommunications business. True would go on to become one of Thailand's major telecommunications operators, contributing to the expansion of Thailand's telecommunications infrastructure.

=== 2005-2017: True Corporation CEO ===
While remaining CEO of True Corporation, in 2006 Chearavanont also became CEO of TrueVisions, a pay-TV subsidiary formed out of UBC. By 2007 he was overseeing four True Corporation subsidiaries beyond TrueVisions: TrueMove operated a mobile phone business, TrueOnline provided data and fixed-line phone services, TrueMoney focused on digital commerce, and TrueLife focused on digital content. In 2007 he established True Plookpanya, a CSR initiative by True Corporation that sought to use communications to "enhance education for underprivileged children" in 6000 schools in rural Thailand. In 2013 Chearavanont helped launch the Digital Infrastructure Fund, considered "Thailand’s first telecommunications infrastructure fund," and also became a director of the C.P. Group subsidiary Siam Makro Public Company Limited. In September 2014, Chearavanont sold 18% of True Corporation to China Mobile, a move that according to the Bangkok Post "managed to stem the bleeding at True" concerning accrued long-term debt.

=== 2015-2018: C.P. Group CEO ===
After becoming an executive director of True's parent organization C.P. Group in 2008, in 2015 Chearavanont was named C.P. Group's vice chairman and president while remaining the president and CEO of True. In 2016 he was announced as the successor to Dhanin Chearavanont as C.P. Group's chief executive, officially becoming CEO on January 9, 2017. On February 21, 2017, he was appointed chairman of True's executive committee, stepping down as True's CEO and president. He remained director of various True subsidiaries, as well as CEO of TrueVisions and TrueMove. On February 24, 2017, Chearavanont announced that True Corporation would invest in expanding TrueMove's 4G networks that year.

In May 2017, Chearavanont stated that C.P. Group would focus on digitizing operations as part of a five-year business plan for the "4.0 era," pushing C.P. Group to become a "technology-led company, spanning food, retail and telecom businesses." He did note the company would avoid complete automation in subsidiaries such as 7-Eleven stores, stating that it was "unproven that unmanned retail operations [would result in greater efficiency]" and "we also have a social responsibility to create jobs." He also outlined expanding logistics for supply chains and distribution systems. Chearavanont announced in 2018 that the new healthcare subsidiary CP Medical Centre Company would construct and operate a Bangkok medical center.

=== 2019-2025: CP Group projects ===
In June 2019, he succeeded Dhanin Chearavanont as True Corporation's chairman. In 2019, Chearavanont announced that CP Group was working with the Thai government to build a $7.4 billion rail network, as well as a train station, mall, hotel, convention center, and rail research center in Bangkok. At C.P. Group he currently oversees "group-wide strategies on sustainability policies and corporate communications," heading several social responsibility and sustainability-related committees. In September 2019, he led the CP Group team that launched an artificial reef project in Thailand. Among other projects, in 2020 he formed a CP Group program to limit deforestation in the Pua District by helping farmers replace maize with crops such as coffee.

In May 2020, Chearavanont announced C. Group would not be laying off any of its 400,000 employees due to COVID-19, and that it had hired 20,000 delivery workers since the start of the pandemic. Also in 2020, he oversaw CP Group's acquisition of Chilindo for $18 million, with the company to "complement" CP Group's WeMall shopping platform and enter the international market. He described buying Chilindo as a "pilot project" to establish a Thai e-commerce platform. Also in 2020, as chairman of the company Eastern High-Speed Rail Linking Three Airports he was overseeing the construction of a high-speed railway project in Thailand.

In 2021, he led the exploration of equal partnership between True Corporation Public Company Limited (True) and Total Access Communication Public Company Limited (dtac). Following the successful completion of the amalgamation of True and dtac in March 2023, the newly formed organization appointed him chair of the board of directors. The new entity focuses on developing technology-driven businesses, fostering a digital ecosystem, and establishing a start-up investment fund to promote innovation.

In Nov 2023, he introduced the concept of “Sustainable Intelligence,” emphasizing the integration of technology, people, and sustainability within the framework of the 5.0 era. He advocated for the business sector to serve as a significant learning resource for Thai children and youth, aiming to nurture their development as researchers, influential leaders, and key contributors to both national and global progress. He remains committed to empowering the younger generation, recognizing them as the driving force for the nation's and the world's future. His vision prioritizes advancing science and technology while upholding ethical principles, fostering positive change toward a sustainable, inclusive society where no one is left behind.

2026

In January 2026, Suphachai became founder, chairman and CEO of Arise Ventures Group Co., Ltd.

== Speaking and writing ==
Chearavanont has published articles on business and building responsible supply chains, and also speaks publicly on corporate and social topics. Among other high-profile talks, Chearavanont gave the keynote speech at "2019 Social Business Day" in Thailand. He was also co-chair of the World Economic Forum's "Annual Meeting of New Champions" in Dalian, China in July 2019. He has written articles for the World Economic Forum on responsible supply chains. In June 2020, he spoke during a United Nations online seminar on corporate sustainability during the COVID-19 pandemic.

== Corporate boards ==
An executive director of C.P. Pokphand Co., Ltd since 2008 and a current vice chairman, he is also vice chairman of both the Charoen Pokphand Foods Public Company Limited and CP ALL Public Company Limited subsidiaries. Other current positions include serving as chairman of True Corporation and a director of True subsidiaries such as TrueMove and TrueVisions. Previously chairman of Wire & Wireless, from 2000 until 2005 he was chairman of Freewill Solutions and afterwards remained on the board.

== Committees and public initiatives ==
Chearavanont has been involved in a number of public initiatives and committees. From 1996 until 2000 he advised Wan Muhamad Noor Matha, then president of the Thai House of Representatives. He was a member of the Thai Listed Companies Association (LCA) from 2005 until 2007, and in 2006 he joined the Thai Red Cross Eye Bank committee, also serving as chairman of organization's fundraising subcommittee. In 2008 he joined the managing committee for the Nation-Wide Strategic Approach Eye Provisioning Project. In 2009 he joined the board of trustees at Bangkok University, and he was a committee member of the Bangkok Art and Culture Center starting in 2010. Also in 2010, he became a director of the Ramathibodi Foundation. Chearavanont was a counselor and advisory board member for the One Young World Summit in 2015. That June, he was elected president of the Telecommunications Association of Thailand (TCT), afterwards remaining an executive director.

As Chief of the Private Sector Team of Public Private Partnership in Education and Leadership Development, Chearavanont was involved with the Connext ED project, which provides access to education in Thailand. In May 2017, he was appointed to the Thai government's Independent Committee for Educational Reform, co-chairing a panel on education and leadership under the government's Pracha Rath initiative. As part of the initiative, Chearavanont pushed for the establishment of national "excellence centers" at universities which could interact with private companies in fields such as nanotechnology and robotics. In 2019 he began a two-year term as a director of the Thai Chamber of Commerce, and in October 2019 Chearavanont was named chairman of the Council of Digital Economy and Society in Thailand. In that role, according to The Nation he was "pushing to transform Thailand into a more competitive country and promote the kingdom as a digital hub." Currently, at Chulalongkorn University he is a director of several degree programs relating to technology and business.

In 2016 he became chair of the preparatory committee for the United Nations Global Compact Network Thailand (GCNT). He currently serves as GCNT chairperson, president and is chairman of the GCNT Steering Committee.

== Accolades ==
- 2006: "Telecom Man of the Year" - Ministry of Information and Communication Technology of Thailand
- 2012: "Best Human Resource Professional of Thailand" for president and CEO category - Thailand Top 100 HR Awards, Thammasat University
- 2013 : "Asia Brand Management Innovation Personality Award" - Asia Brand Awards
- 2015: "Frost & Sullivan Asia Pacific Telecom CEO of the Year" - Asia Pacific ICT Awards
- 2019: "Thai Venerable People Award" for Outstanding Religion Support - Asia Media Thailand Communication Association and Thai Society Support Network Council
- 2019: "Thai People Role Model Award" for Outstanding Mass Communication - Radio, Television and Newspaper Program Producer Assembly of Thailand
- 2019: "Gold Telly Award" in the Religion TV Program Category for "True Little Monk : A Wisdom Training Programme for Novices"
- 2020: "2020 Leader of Virtue Asoke Statue Award" - Association of Contributors towards Buddhism

== Personal life ==
Chearavanont and his wife Busadee Chearavanont have three children, Korawad, Kamolnan, and Zander Chearavanont, and live in Bangkok, Thailand. Among his hobbies are cycling and traveling.
