= Korawad Chearavanont =

Thai entrepreneur

- กรวัฒน์ เจียรวนนท์ 謝鎔仁
- Education: The Lawrenceville School; Columbia University
- Occupation: Internet entrepreneur
- Known for: Founding Amity (previously Eko Communications)
- Title: CEO of Amity
- Relatives: Suphachai Chearavanont (father); Busadee Chearavanont (mother); Dhanin Chearavanont (grandfather)
- Family: Chearavanont family

Korawad Chearavanont (Thai: กรวัฒน์ เจียรวนนท์) is a Thai entrepreneur, founder and executive chairman of Amity, formerly known as Eko, an AI and software group that primarily focuses on serving the retail and telecommunications verticals, headquartered in Bangkok, Thailand.

== Biography ==
Chearavanont is the son of Suphachai Chearavanont, CEO of Charoen Pokphand Group, Thailand's largest private company where his grandfather Dhanin Chearavanont currently serves as senior chairman. He was educated at the Lawrenceville School and Columbia University for two years, where he was a history major, before leaving in 2015 to pursue a career in entrepreneurship.

=== Amity ===
In 2012, Chearavanont founded Amity (previously known as Eko Communications) as a mobile chat app, taking a year off from boarding school to do so. After living in Princeton, NJ during a gap year and wanting to focus on Amity, Chearavanont made a deal with his family that he could quit college if he raised at least $5 million for his company, which he was able to do after initially raising a seed round from Tigerlabs Ventures which was quickly followed by a Series A funding through investors such as 500 Startups, Gobi Ventures, and Itochu. The Series B funding round led by Sinar Mas Digital Ventures raised $20 million, with investors such as Air Asia’s digital investment fund and EV Growth, giving a total amount of $28.7 million by 2019.

Chearavanont stated that the enterprise collaboration market “is really open right now” when discussing the many competitors like Slack, Microsoft, and Facebook.

Notable clients of Amity include companies such as Bangkok Bank, Thanachart Bank, BEC-TERO, True Corporation, and Telekom Malaysia. There are currently approximately five million active users across Asia, Europe, and North America.

In June 2020, Amity acquired local AI chatbot firm, ConvoLab, and formed a new parent firm, changing its name from Eko to Amity, as part of its expansion plans.

In July 2024, Amity and its parent company, Amity Corporation, completed a $60 million Series C financing round. This included $41.6 million raised by Amity (led by Insight Capital) and $18.4 million raised by Amity Corporation (led by returning investor SMDV, with participation from Gobi Partners and several existing investors), utilizing both equity and debt financing structured by AlteriQ Global.

The funds were explicitly earmarked to drive a "Build, Buy, Bridge" merger and acquisition strategy. Executing on this in September 2024, Amity acquired a majority stake in Tollring, a UK-based call analytics and intelligence provider. The transaction, valued in the ten-digit Thai Baht range, aimed to bolster Amity's generative AI voice analytics capabilities and significantly expand its European footprint.

Most recently, in March 2026, Amity announced a $100 million Series D funding round led by Singapore's EDBI, the investment arm of SG Growth Capital, alongside Asia Partners and SMDV, with participation from existing and new investors, including CMLIM Capital. This pre-IPO round, aimed at expanding its GenAI capabilities across Southeast Asia and Europe ahead of a planned 2027 public listing, brought the company's total reported funding to approximately $160 million, up from the previously announced US$60 million in late 2024.

=== Accolades ===
In 2016, Chearavanont was listed on "Forbes 30 Under 30 Asia" under the Enterprise Tech category.
