= Soopakij Chearavanont =

Thai business executive

- สุภกิต เจียรวนนท์
- Born: 1963 (age 61–62)
- Education: New York University (BBA)
- Title: Chairman: C.P. Group
- Spouse: Marisa Chearavanont
- Parent(s): Dhanin Chearavanont; Tewee Chearavanont
- Family: Chearavanont family

Soopakij Chearavanont (Thai: สุภกิต เจียรวนนท์; born 1963) is a Thai businessman and Chairman of C.P. Group, a multinational conglomerate owned by his father.

== Early life and education ==
Soopakij attended New York University, graduating in 1987 from the Stern School of Business with a Bachelor of Business Administration.

== Career ==
On 9 January 2017, Soopakij assumed the role of Chairman of C.P. Group, with his younger brother Suphachai assumed the role of CEO. Both positions were previously held by their father, Dhanin Chearavanont.

== Personal life ==
Soopakij married Korean-born Marisa, also known as Kang Soo-hyeong, in 1998.
