= Aden (company) =

- Company type: Private, subsidiary
- Founded: 1997; 29 years ago
- Headquarters: Bangkok, Thailand
- Area served: Southeast Asia
- Key people: Dean Krvetski (COO, E-commerce)
- Industry: Logistics
- Services: E-commerce, fulfillment, logistics
- Parent: Ascend Group
- Website: Aden eCommerce Solutions

Aden Business Center, known simply as Aden, is a privately owned e-commerce enabler, fulfillment and logistics company headquartered in Bangkok, Thailand, as a subsidiary of Ascend Group.

It operates warehouse facilities in Thailand and the Philippines, with an ongoing expansion to Vietnam.

== Facilities ==
Early version of the logo, 2014

Aden operates fulfillment centers in Thailand and Philippines, serving more than 30.000 customers daily. It aims to further increase the capacity by leveraging the extensive network of fulfillment centers and retail locations of CP Group.

It supports the logistics and delivery operation of Ascend Group’s e-commerce ventures, namely iTrueMart, WeLoveShopping and WeMall, as part of the main subsidiary unit Ascend Commerce.

== Expansion ==
=== Additional services ===
From the initial order fulfillment and logistics, Aden now includes e-commerce platform development, business intelligence, online marketing and store management. Aden plans to expand its pioneer and updated portfolio across emerging Southeast Asian markets like Vietnam, Malaysia and Indonesia by 2017.
