= Baksaas =

Baksaas is a Norwegian surname. Notable people with the surname include:

- Bendik Baksaas (born 1991), Norwegian jazz and electronica musician
- Jon Fredrik Baksaas (born 1954), Norwegian businessman
