= True Mobile =

Thai telecommunication company

- Native name: ทรู โมบาย
- Formerly: TrueMove (2006-2023)
- Type: Division
- Industry: Telecommunications
- Predecessor: TelecomAsia
- Founded: 2006; 20 years ago
- Headquarters: True Tower, Bangkok, Thailand
- Products: Mobile phone Mobile telephony Internet access
- Parent: True Corporation
- Website: www.true.th/truemoveh/site/

True Mobile is a mobile telecommunication operator provided by True Corporation. It is the largest operator in Thailand.

True Mobile is a mobile virtual network operator that uses NT's 850 MHz network, acquired from Hutchison CAT Wireless MultiMedia Ltd (Hutch). True Mobile uses 900 MHz, 1800 MHz and 2100 MHz, which licenses were granted by Thailand's National Broadcasting and Telecommunications Commission.

The predecessor brand "TrueMove" was operating on GSM 1800 MHz network when the license expired in September 2013.

True Mobile now provides 5G in Thailand.

== History ==
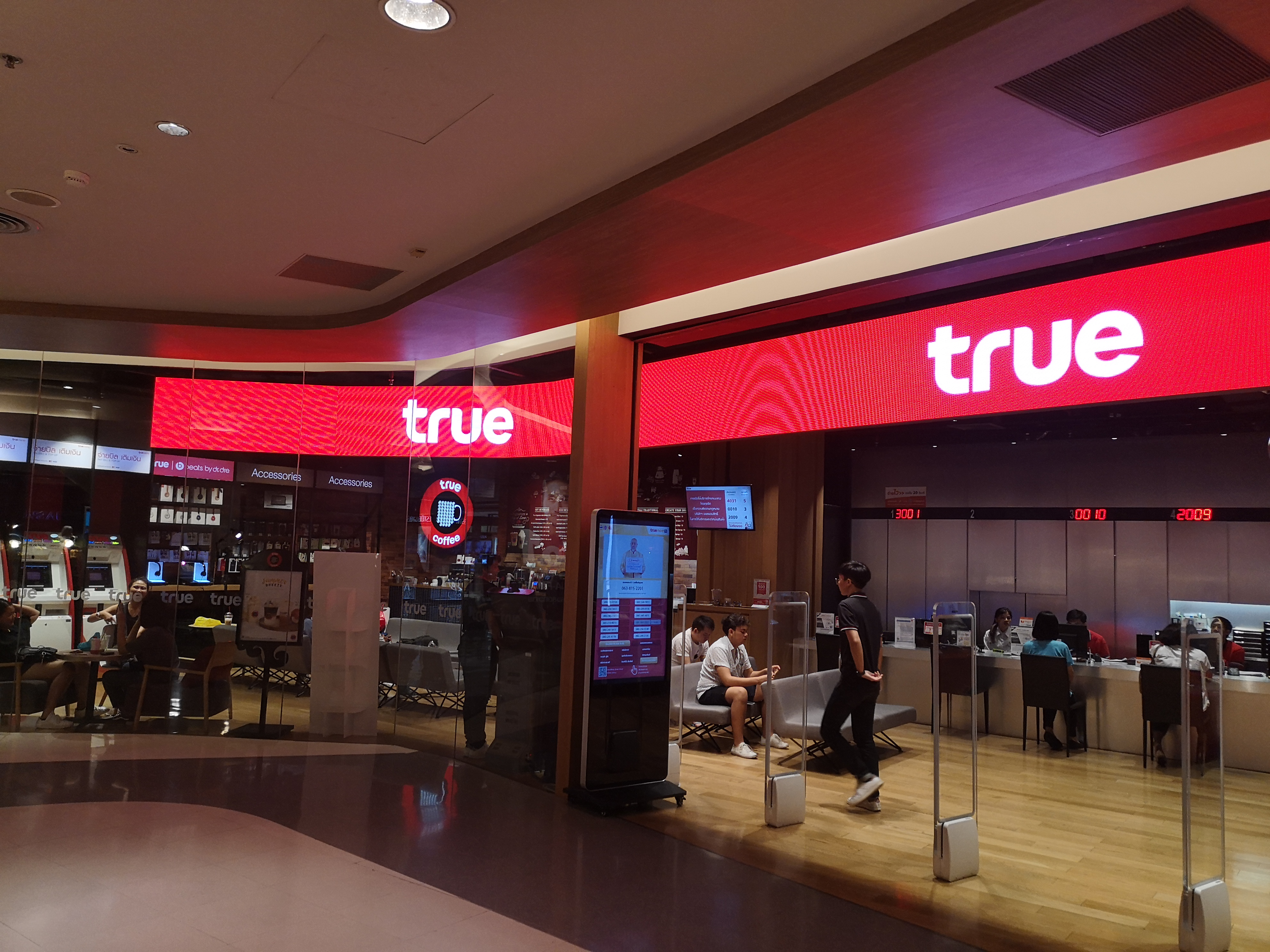
True shop at Central Silom Complex

=== Origin ===
In 2000, Charoen Pokphand (CP) acquired Wireless Communication Services Co., Ltd. (WCS), a company with a license to operate mobile telecommunication service on 1800 MHz.

In 2001, WCS formed a partnership with a global telecom Orange, and WCS was later renamed to CP Orange. In 2002, it was renamed to TA Orange.

In 2004, Orange sold its stake in TA Orange to TelecomAsia for the nominal price of TH฿1.

TA Orange continued to be marketed as Orange until 2006.

TA Orange was rebranded to TrueMove in 2006 after TelecomAsia was rebranded to True Corporation.

=== Hutch acquisition ===
In 2010, True Corporation acquired Hutch and its subsidiary from CAT Telecom. Real Move, a subsidiary of True, replaced Hutch as an operator of CAT's 850 MHz CDMA network.

TrueMove H was launched as a brand to market the reselling of 850 MHz from CAT Telecom.

TrueMove H launched its 4G service in a limited scale on 8 May 2013. It was the first 4G service in Thailand using LTE technology.

In 2012, True's subsidiary, Real Future (now True Mobile), won the 2100 MHz license, together with its rivals AIS and Dtac.

In 2015, True Move H won the licenses for 900 MHz and 1800 MHz.

On November 22, 2021, Telenor and Charoen Pokphand Group, officially announced they have agreed to explore a USD 8.6 billion merger plan between Thailand’s second and third largest telecom operators (by subscribers), True Corporation (TRUEE) and Total Access Communication (DTAC) – The proposed merger is subject to regulatory approvals. The merger is expected to be completed by late-September 2022. The merger was "acknowledged" by the regulator NBTC at a meeting on October 20, 2022. The newly merged company still retain the True Corporation name, which was founded on March 1, 2023 and it was listed on the Stock Exchange of Thailand under the stock ticker symbol TRUE on March 3, 2023.

== Total Access Communication ==
Total Access Communication
- Industry: Telecommunications
- Founded: 31 August 1989; 37 years ago
- Founder: Boonchai Bencharongkul
- Defunct: 1 March 2023; 3 years ago
- Fate: Acquired by True Corporation in 2023
- Successor: True Corporation
- Headquarters: Bangkok, Thailand
- Key people: Sigve Brekke (Chairman); Sharad Mehrotra (President and CEO)
- Products: Mobile; internet
- Revenue: ▼80.753 billion baht US$ 2.3 billion (FY 2022)
- Net income: ▼5.893 billion baht (2015)
- Total assets: ▲110.965 billion baht (2015)
- Parent: BCTN Holding (1989-2023); Telenor (1989-2023); True Corporation (2023-present)
- Subsidiaries: Paysbuy (2017-2018)

Total Access Communication Public Company Limited (DTAC) was a mobile phone company in Thailand. It was the nation's third largest mobile carrier, after Advanced Info Service (AIS) and True Mobile. DTAC was owned by Norwegian company Telenor both directly and indirectly, and both companies share the same logo. As of 31 December 2011, DTAC had 23.2 million subscribers with a market share of subscribers at around 30 percent. As of 2019, the company has 20.642 million mobile subscriptions and 3904 employees. It is listed on the Singapore Exchange and the Stock Exchange of Thailand.

In 2015, DTAC reported total assets of 110,965 million baht, with revenues of 87,753 million baht, and a net profit of 5,893 million baht.

As of 11 April 2012, DTAC's parent company became BCTN Holding.

DTAC has won the "Best Mobile Operator of Thailand" award for three consecutive years (2005–2007) from Asian MobileNews Awards 2007, organized by Asian MobileNews Magazine.

=== Services and coverage ===
DTAC claims to have the second-widest coverage nationwide, compared to its main rival AIS, with more than 13,000 base stations installed as of 2016 on the 850 MHz, 1800 MHz and 2100 MHz bands.

As of 2013 DTAC is offering both EDGE and 3G services on its postpaid and prepaid brands DTAC Happy. Unlimited Internet access stands at a price of 999 baht per month or 49 baht per day (numerous cheaper hourly packages are available, and, in 2010, traffic-based packages were also introduced, obviously due to the increasing popularity of smartphones). DTAC has international roaming agreements with 147 countries.

Currently DTAC is offering 3G commercial service as seen on this coverage map. 3G+ service can be used with 3G+ compatible mobile devices (WCDMA 850 and 2100 and/or HSPA/HSPA+ 850 and 2100) with speeds of up to 42 Mbit/s.

4G LTE service is available as of 2014 on the 2100 MHz band, and the enhanced 4G LTE service on the 1800 MHz and 2100 MHz bands (Not Carrier Aggregation) has been available in the major areas of Bangkok since October 2015 and had extended their coverage level to the major areas of the country since March 2016, and claims to have their 4G LTE coverage nationwide within the end of 2016. DTAC claims to have their 4G LTE network 3 times faster than before.

In February 2020, the company announced plans to launch first home-based ultra-high-speed broadband service by June on the 26-gigahertz range it secured in the 5G spectrum licence auction.

== Controversies ==
=== Issuing SIM card without checking ID ===
In July 2016, a businessman from Ayutthaya lost TH฿ 986,700 after TrueMove H issued a new SIM card to a thief without checking an ID. The SIM card was said to be linked to the businessman's online account, and the thief used the SIM card to obtain a new passcode to access the victim's online account. Kasikorn paid the victim with full compensation, while TrueMove H agreed to give the victim a new Apple iPhone 6s Plus and one year of free calls.

== See also ==
- True Corporation
- TrueVisions
