= Charoen Pokphand Foods =

Thai agro-industrial and food company

Charoen Pokphand Foods Public Company Limited
- Native name: บริษัท เจริญโภคภัณฑ์อาหาร จำกัด (มหาชน)
- Type: Public
- Traded as: SET: CPF
- ISIN: TH0101A10Z01
- Industry: Agriculture, Food and Beverage
- Founded: 17 January 1978; 48 years ago
- Founder: Dhanin Chearavanont
- Headquarters: Bangkok, Thailand
- Key people: Adirek Sripratak (CEO)
- Products: Animal Feed, Animal Breeder, Meat and Food
- Revenue: 501,507 million baht (2017)
- Net income: 15,259 million baht (2017)
- Total assets: 593,497 million baht (2017)
- Number of employees: 126,341 (2017)
- Parent: Charoen Pokphand Group Co., Ltd. (largest single shareholder)
- Website: www.cpfworldwide.com

Charoen Pokphand Foods Public Company Limited, (Thai: บริษัท เจริญโภคภัณฑ์อาหาร จำกัด (มหาชน)) a company of the Charoen Pokphand Group, is an agro-industrial and food conglomerate headquartered in Thailand. It is one of the world's largest producers of feed and shrimp, and is also a global top three producer of poultry and pork.

Approximately 64 percent of its revenue came from overseas operations, with 30 percent from its home market of Thailand, and six percent from export operations. It recently acquired Bellisio Foods, one of the largest frozen food suppliers in the United States, for US$1 billion, as well as Westbridge Foods, a major British poultry producer with turnover of over £340 Million

The company's core businesses are livestock and aquaculture. Livestock operations include chicken broilers, chicken layers, ducks, and swine. In aquaculture, the two main marine animals are shrimp and fish.

== Financials ==
Calendar year 2017 results: revenues of 501,507 million baht, net income of 15,259 million baht, and total assets of 593,497 million baht. It employed 126,341 persons in 2017.

== Operations ==
=== Livestock ===
CPF's livestock business includes broilers, layers, swine, and ducks. Products can be divided into three main categories, animal feed, farm, and meat and food products.

==== Animal feed ====
The company produces livestock feed in the forms of concentrate, powder and pellets for chickens, cows, swine, and ducks. The feed is distributed by more than 600 sales representatives throughout Thailand. A portion of the livestock feed is sold directly to large animal farms.

==== Animal breeding ====
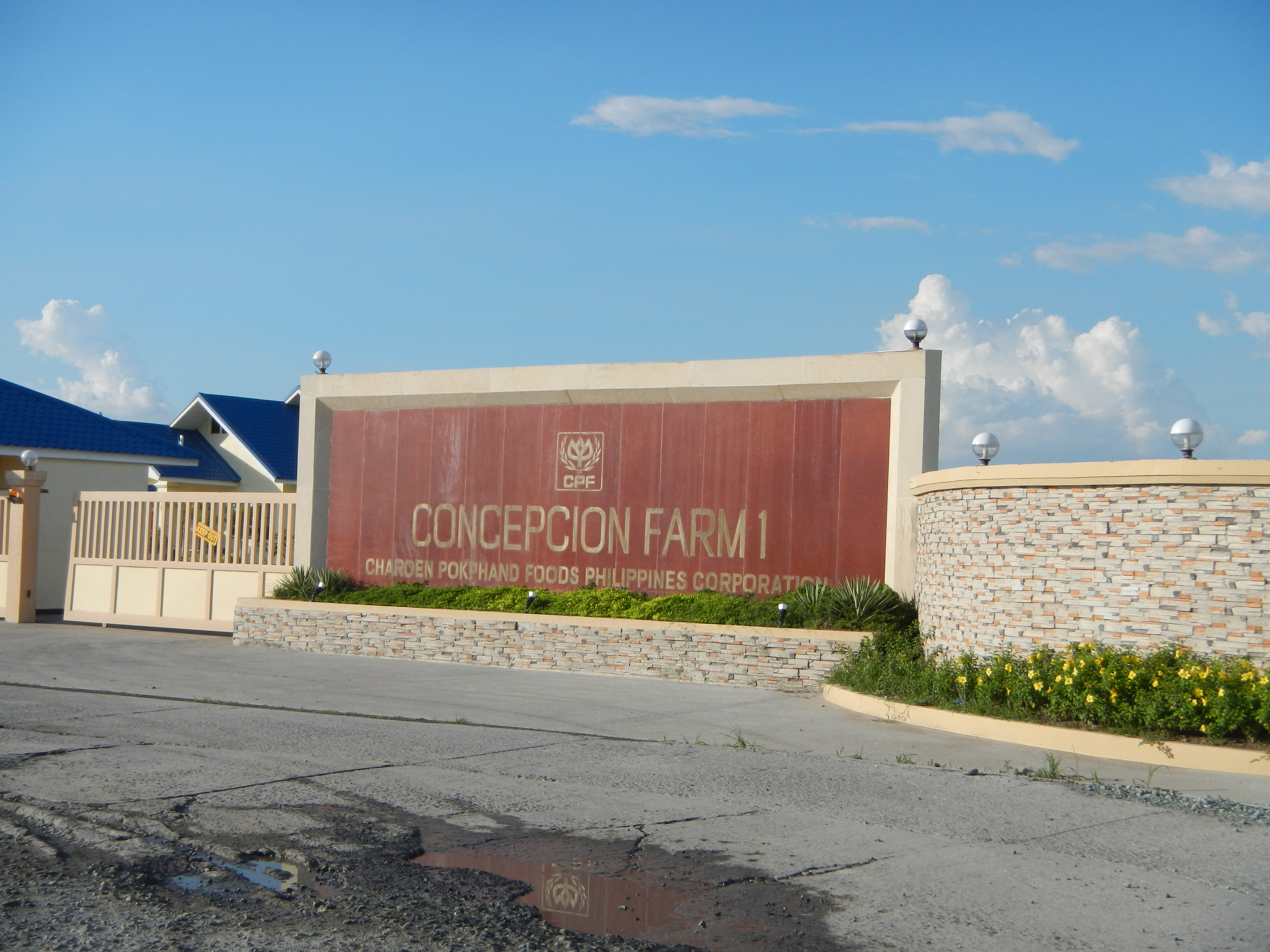
Thai-owned Charoen Pokphand Foods Philippines Corp. for the production of parent stocks, in Tinang, Concepcion, Tarlac.

The company researches and develops natural animal breeds. The goal is to obtain breeds that are disease-free and suited to the breeding environment in Thailand. The company produces parent stock broiler chicks, parent stock layer chicks, parent stock swine, broiler chicks, layer chicks, layers, and piglets for distribution to animal farms and domestic sales representatives.

Grandparent stock used in livestock breeding is imported from abroad to breed parent stock which are then raised on the company's farms.

The NGO World Animal Protection succeeded in persuading CPF, a major pork producer, to end the use of uses sow stalls in their pork production process by 2025.

==== Meat and food products ====
Products in this category can be further divided according to two types of production processes: animal farming for commercial purposes and processing and manufacture of cooked food products.

===== Animal farming for commercial purposes =====
Products from animal farming for commercial purposes include live chickens, eggs, live ducks, and live swine which are distributed to sales representatives throughout the country. The products are also distributed in surrounding local areas, to wholesalers and retailers, or to the company's processing plants or other processing plants in Thailand.

The company has offices across the country, which act as centers for technical information to farmers on how to properly raise animals to obtain fast growth as well as assistance with marketing and distribution.

The company has a support program for the farming of swine and broilers. The company selects farmers who have their own farms and farming equipment. Selected farmers receive support in the areas of animal breeds, animal feed, medication, and farming knowledge from the company. The company then undertakes to purchase all yield which meets the CPF standards.

===== Processing and manufacture of cooked food products =====
Broilers, ducks, and swine from the company's farms are brought to processing plants to be butchered into meat products according to customer specifications. The meats are packaged, frozen, and distributed as chilled and frozen meat products to wholesalers, domestic retailers, and importers in various countries. The company adds value to processed meat products by flavoring and cooking through the process of boiling, steaming, frying, baking and grilling according to customer specifications. Export products are distributed through importers in various countries in the European Union, Asia, and Japan.

=== Aquaculture ===
The aquaculture business includes mainly shrimp and some fish. The products can be classified into three main categories: animal feed, animal breeders, and meat and food products.

==== Animal feed ====
The company produces and distributes aquatic feed, with the main product being shrimp feed. Aquatic feed is produced in the forms of concentrate, powder, and pellets and distributed through sales representatives who are in shrimp farming areas throughout the country. Agricultural products such as soybean meal, fish meal, and wheat flour are used in the production of aquatic feed.

==== Aquatic breeders ====
===== Shrimp culture farms and hatcheries =====
Following the company's policy of supporting sustained growth and development in the shrimp industry, the company has developed shrimp fry to distribute to farmers, which will increase their opportunity to successfully farm shrimp. In 2004, the company entered into a joint venture with an American company with shrimp breeding expertise to develop shrimp fry that are suitable for farming conditions in Thailand. The company's culture farms and hatcheries are in the shrimp farming areas in the eastern and southern regions of Thailand.

===== Fish culture farms and hatcheries =====
The company has developed fish breeds to distribute to farmers, including tabtim fish fry, developed from tilapia fish. In 2006, the company also succeeded in developing the morakot fish breed type, which was developed from basa fish.

===== Fish food products =====
Products in this category can be further divided according to two types of production process: shrimp and fish farming for commercial purposes and processing and manufacture of cooked food products.

===== Farming for commercial purposes =====
"Traceability" has prompted the company to expand its shrimp farming business, resulting in fully integrated operations that produce for the company's processing plants as well as other processing plants in Thailand. In the management of the company's shrimp farms, research and development and technology are applied to find ways to prevent the outbreak of disease in shrimp and farming methods, which are friendly to the environment and do not cause residue build-up. The company promotes "probiotic farming" which avoids the use of drugs and chemicals.

===== Processing and manufacture of cooked food products =====
Products derived from processing are one of the important products in the food products category of the aquaculture business. The main products are processed fresh shrimp and value-added processed shrimp, most of which are produced for export as chilled and frozen products and distributed through importers in various countries. The selling prices are also determined by agreement if the products have been manufactured according to customer specifications.

== Controversies ==
=== Slavery allegations ===
In June 2014, after a several-month-long investigation, the British newspaper The Guardian claimed that Charoen Pokphand Foods (CPF) purchases fishmeal, which it then feeds to its farmed prawns, from suppliers that own, operate, or buy from fishing boats manned with slaves. The Guardian claimed that after the slaves are bought "for as little as £250", the working conditions on those boats included forced labor with 20-hour work days, forced drug use, starvation, and executions.

In July 2014, CP Foods hosted a three-day meeting to create a task force on the issue, with representatives from retailers, local government authorities, and non-governmental organisations such as Oxfam and the Environmental Justice Foundation. The progress made at this meeting is difficult to ascertain, as the original newspaper, The Guardian, has not posted any additional stories and the company website's sustainability page says "For the latest general update covering our approach and achievements" to read a page from December 2013, which promises "a further progress update in Q1 2014."

The president and CEO of Charoen Pokphand subsequently posted a "Statement to Shareholders" vowing to purchase only from certified processing plants, only acquire product from certified Thai fisheries, and that supply chain "...fishing vessels, fishmeal processing plants...must be certified by Thailand's Labor Standard or have been audited...by an external agency (Third Party)...."

In Australia, Woolworths stocks only CPF-Vietnam products and Metcash, wholesale supplier to Independent Grocers of Australia (IGA), has eliminated CPF SKUs from their inventory.

In January 2017, the United States District Court, Northern District of California ruled on multiple grounds in favour of CP Foods in relation to litigation brought against them and others, which claimed damages related to the alleged presence of human rights abuses in the supply chain for Thai shrimp. The Court's order - dismissal with prejudice - bars the plaintiffs from bringing such claims again.

=== Allegations of links to blackchin tilapia outbreak ===
CP Foods has been alleged to be the source of an outbreak of the blackchin tilapia. The blackchin tilapia is native to West Africa but became an invasive species in Thailand, having spread to 19 provinces as of 2025. This raised suspicions that the source could be CP Foods, as it is the only private company to have obtained regulatory approval for legally import of fish for research purposes. A class action lawsuit was filed against CP Foods by fishermen from Samut Songkhram, which was accepted by the Bangkok South Civil Court in March 2025. A panel of the House of Representatives of Thailand also came to the conclusion that the "sole legally authorized importer" of the fish was to blame and urged state agencies to take legal action. CP Foods has publicly acknowledged that it imported the fish from Ghana in 2010 for breeding research at Yisan Farm, Samut Songkhram, close to where the outbreak first began a year later, However, the company denied being the cause of the outbreak. CP Foods claimed that the fish it had imported all died within days and were properly disposed of in line with regulations, with samples of the dead fish sent to the Department of Fisheries. However, the Department stated it had no record of receiving samples from CP Foods. Moreover, Bancha Sukkaew, the ex-chief of the fishery department, had mentioned that approximately 230,000 blackchin tilapia were shipped by 11 exporters to 17 countries between 2013 and 2016. In 2025, CP Foods sued the BioThai Foundation and its director, environmental activist Witoon Lianchamroon, for defamation. This lawsuit followed the BioThai Foundation’s sharing of data that linked the outbreak to Yisan Farm at an academic conference in September 2024. Various groups expressed concern that this amounted to a SLAPP suit intended to silence debate, including Mary Lawlor, the United Nations Special Rapporteur on the situation of human rights defenders, who stated the charges were baseless and a reprisal for Witoon's work on community rights and food security.The lawsuit is specifically in response to Biothai's use of "false" images and information, which created public misunderstanding and damaged its reputation. On October 22, 2025, the Nonthaburi Provincial Court held the first hearing in a criminal defamation case filed by the public prosecutor against Witoon Lianjamroon, Secretary-General of the BioThai Foundation. The charges involve criminal defamation through the publication of false and misleading information regarding the spread of invasive blackchin tilapia, which has caused significant reputational damage to CPF. During the hearing, Witoon Lianjamroon, the defendant, pleaded not guilty. CPF, as the injured party, submitted a motion to join the case as a co-plaintiff alongside the public prosecutor. The Court approved this motion and scheduled the pre-trial evidence examination for December 1, 2025.

A 2026 study by researchers at the Aquatic Resources Research Institute, Chulalongkorn University, reported genetic evidence that blackchin tilapia in Thailand did not originate from a single source or a single introduction event. Haplotype distribution and phylogenetic analyses indicated multiple introductions from different origins, followed by dispersal within Thailand, with some spread likely facilitated by human activities.

== See also ==
- Chearavanont family
