= TrueVisions =

Thai cable and satellite TV company

TrueVisions Group Co., Ltd.
- Formerly: United Broadcasting Corporation (UBC); UBC-True
- Type: Subsidiary
- Industry: Pay television Mass media
- Founded: July 1, 1998; 28 years ago
- Headquarters: 118/1 Tipco Building, Rama XI Road, Sam Sen Nai, Phyathai, Bangkok 10400, Thailand
- Area served: Southeast Asia
- Key people: Soopakij Chearavanont (chairman); Suphachai Chearavanont (CEO)
- Products: Digital satellite and cable TV
- Parent: True Corporation
- Website: truevisions.co.th

TrueVisions Group Co., Ltd. is a provider of cable and satellite television services in Thailand. It is a wholly-owned subsidiary of True Corporation. Prior to February 2007, the company was known by various other names, including United Broadcasting Corporation (UBC), United Television Cable Network (UTV) and the International Broadcasting Corporation (IBC).

== History ==
=== International Broadcasting Corporation (1989–1998) ===
International Broadcasting Corporation Limited
- Type: Subsidiary
- Industry: Pay television
- Founded: April 17, 1989; 37 years ago
- Founder: Thaksin Shinawatra
- Defunct: July 1, 1998
- Headquarters: Bangkok, Thailand
- Area served: Thailand
- Products: Satellite television

In 1983, American communications company Clearview International announced a proposal to launch a nationwide satellite television project in Thailand, having introduced a similar television service in Tonga earlier that year. Clearview partnered with Thaksin Sinawatra, the then-chairman of Shinawatra Computers, to establish the International Broadcasting Coropration (IBC) on April 17, 1989. The IBC was Thailand's first national television provider.

The Mass Communication Organization of Thailand, Thailand's state-owned public broadcaster, granted a cable TV license to IBC in 1989, along with IBC's main rival, Thai Cablevision (UTV). That year, IBC began broadcasting its programs via super high frequency microwaves using a multichannel multipoint distribution service. Initially, the IBC's broadcasts were limited to Bangkok and other major cities in Thailand.

In 1995, after receiving approval for a coverage area expansion, the IBC began its first direct-to-home television service. In 1997, the South African–Dutch company MIH Limited purchased a 16% stake in the IBC. The IBC obtained most of its programming content from international channels, including HBO, CNN and ESPN.

=== UTV Cable Network (1993–1998) ===
Thai Cable Vision Public Company Limited
- Type: Public
- Founded: October 2, 1992; 34 years ago
- Defunct: July 1, 1998

UTV Cable Network was founded on October 2, 1992, to provide cable television services in Thailand under the aegis of TelecomAsia. In September 1995, UTV began providing television service in the Bangkok metropolitan area on a hybrid fibre-optic network. It also provided pay-per-view services. By 1997, UTV's cable network reached about 800,000 homes. In 1997, UTV sold its cable infrastructure to its sister company, Asia Multimedia Company Limited. This allowed UTV to focus on content and service delivery to its subscribers.

=== Merger with United Broadcasting Corporation (1998–2006) ===
Following the 1997 Asian financial crisis, IBC merged with UTV in February 1998 in order to decrease operational costs and reduce staff overhead. The result of the merger was the United Broadcasting Corporation (UBC), which officially began operations on July 1, 1998. The UBC faced criticism due to its status as a monopoly in the cable TV industry, and later split into two companies: UBC PCL. which provided satellite television services, and UBC Cable Co., Ltd. which provided cable television services.

In 1998, the Shin Corporation (formerly Shinawatra Computer Co., Ltd.) sold its entire stake in UBC to TelecomAsia.

=== UBC-True (2006–2007) ===
In November 2005, True Corporation bought a 30.59% stake in UBC from MIH Holdings. The company launched an offer for 221 million outstanding shares at a sale price of 26.5 baht per share, and subsequently delisted UBC from the Thai stock exchange. In April 2006, UBC rebranded to "UBC-True".

On April 2, 2006, UBC-True announced the launch of a series of documentary channels (Explore 1, Explore 2, and Explore 3). In the following months, UBC-True expanded its entertainment offerings with two promotional channels, G-Square and UBC Preview, followed by two music channels, Majung TV and True Music.

=== TrueVisions (2007–present) ===
On January 24, 2007, UBC-True was re-branded as "TrueVisions UBC". The following day, Truevisions UBC announced its successful purchase of exclusive broadcasting rights to the Premier League in Thailand.

On July 12, 2012, as part of its efforts to combat copyright infringement, TrueVisions switched its content encryption system to VideoGuard and upgraded its video encryption from MPEG-2 to the newer MPEG-4 standard. The switch was implemented in the company's new line of high-definition set-top boxes, launched in October 2011.

In 2012, TrueVisions lost its bid for the Premier League broadcast rights to Cable Thai. The company reacquired the league's broadcast rights in 2016, signing a sub-licensing agreement with Qatar-based sports network beIN Sports. TrueVisions has since acquired the Premier League's broadcasting rights in Thailand from 2019 through 2022.

== Subscribers ==
At the end of the 2008 financial year, TrueVisions had a total of 799,837 paid subscribers, with an additional 669,000 subscribers on the company's free-to-air Free View package. The table below charts the annual growth of TrueVisions' paid subscriber base:

| Year | Subscribers |
|---|---|
| 1998 | 301,309 |
| 1999 | 324,537 |
| 2000 | 380,956 |
| 2001 | 406,589 |
| 2002 | 437,845 |
| 2003 | 434,815 |
| 2004 | 457,542 |
| 2005 | 483,816 |
| 2006 | 558,860 |
| 2007 | 618,228 |
| 2008 | 799,837 |

== Products ==
=== Personal Video Recording ===
In July 2008, TrueVisions launched a personal video recording (PVR) system. Sold separately with an extra monthly fee, the PVR set-top box included a 140 GB hard drive for recording personal videos.

=== High-definition channels ===
In November 2007, TrueVisions started testing high definition (HD) television broadcasts, and began developing a HD set-top box. The system was demonstrated at the Bangkok ICT Expo. In 2010, TrueVisions began offering high-definition broadcasts of three HD channels, including HBO, to customers with premium subscriptions. The following year, this lineup was expanded to eight channels, and coincided with the launch of a new HD and PVR set-top box. TrueVisions also began a planned extension of its fibre optic cable networks to some provincial areas. On July 16, 2012, TrueVisions further expanded their high-definition offerings to seventeen channels, and made all channels available to satellite and cable subscribers. By September 2016, TrueVisions expanded its high-definition lineup to 56 channels.

=== HD set-top box ===
In October 2011, TrueVisions launched an all-in-one high-definition set-top box called "HD Plus", following the launch of its high-definition television service. The HD Plus was manufactured by Samsung and Humax, and used an external eSATA hard drive for digital video recording. On September 22, 2014, the extra monthly fee for PVR service was removed for customers with premium packages.

=== 3D broadcasts ===
In 2008, TrueVisions began testing 3D television broadcasts, showing a series of short European-made vignettes filmed using the Pulfrich effect. In 2009, segments of the Thai reality TV show Academy Fantasia were broadcast live using the Pulfrich effect. Since 2013, TrueVisions' True Film HD channel has aired selected movies in a side-by-side 3D format.

=== 4K UHD ===
On May 18, 2018, TrueVisions announced it would broadcast several live matches from the 2018 FIFA World Cup in ultra high-definition on a new dedicated 4K UHD channel.

== See also ==
- List of television channels in Thailand § TrueVisions Homemade channels
- Media of Thailand
