= Sigve Brekke =

Norwegian business leader, former politician

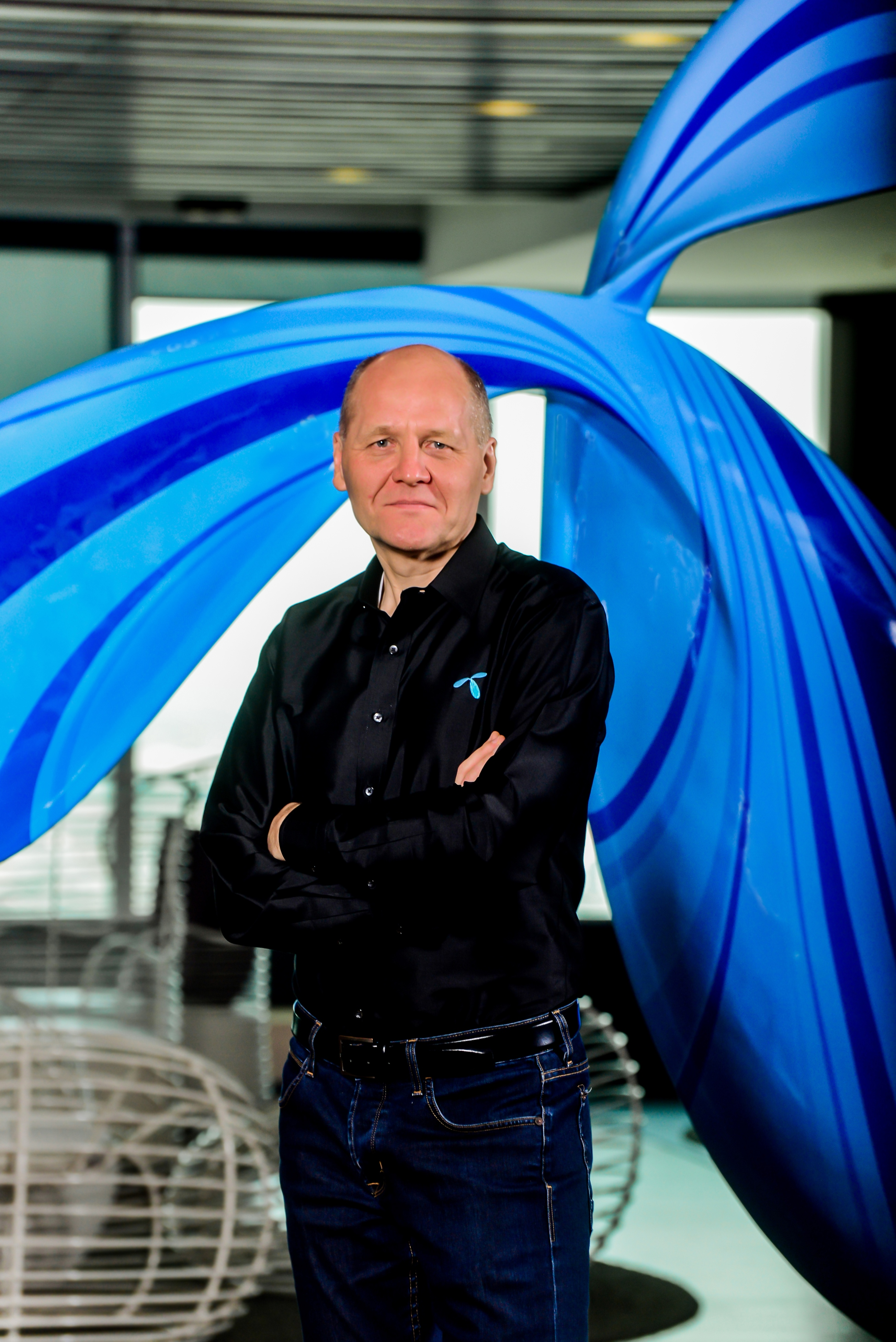
- Born: 15 December 1959 (age 66)
- Education: Studies at Telemark University College, Harvard University
- Occupations: Former President and CEO, Telenor, 2015-2024

Sigve Brekke (born 15 December 1959) is the former president and CEO of Telenor Group. In January 2025, Thai conglomerate CP Group announced Brekke's appointment to oversee its telecommunications and digital businesses.

== Telenor career ==
Sigve Brekke was a member of the Executive Management team of Telenor Group from 2008 to 2024. He succeeded Jon Fredrik Baksaas as president and CEO in August 2015 and served in this role until stepping down in December 2024.

Sigve Brekke joined Telenor in 1999 as Manager Business Development and later managing director of its Singapore office. He worked as co-Chief Executive Officer of Thai mobile operator dtac (part of the Telenor Group) from 2002 to 2005, and Chief Executive Officer in Dtac from 2005 to 2008. From 2008 to 2015, Sigve Brekke was responsible for Telenor's operations in Asia.

Consistent with his hands-on leadership style, Brekke engaged directly in operations when required. He served as Managing Director of Uninor, Telenor's Indian business unit, from 2010 to 2013, and as interim CEO at dtac from September 2014 to March 2015.

== Political career ==
Prior to joining Telenor, Sigve Brekke was a politician. He was the secretary-general of the Workers' Youth League from 1989 to 1992. In March 1993 he was appointed as a political adviser in the Ministry of Defence, being a part of Brundtland's Third Cabinet. In November 1993 he was promoted to State Secretary in the Ministry of Defence, where he served until 1996.

== Education ==
He holds a Mid-Career Master in Public Administration (MC/MPA) - a one-year program - from the John F. Kennedy School of Government, Harvard University. He has also been an associate research fellow at the same school.

Business positions
Preceded by Jon Fredrik Baksaas	CEO of Telenor; 2015-2024	Succeeded by Benedicte Schilbred Fasmer
Party political offices
Preceded by Ståle Dokken	Secretary-general of the Workers' Youth League; 1989–1992	Succeeded by Rita Ottervik
