= Harald Link =

Thai-German businessman (born 1955)

- Born: Harald Link; January 12, 1955 (age 71); Basel, Switzerland
- Education: University of St. Gallen
- Occupation: Businessman
- Known for: Chairman, CEO, and owner of B.Grimm

Harald Link (born 12 January 1955) is a Thai-German businessman, industrialist, and philanthropist. He is the chairman, CEO, and owner of B.Grimm of Bangkok, Thailand. As of 2020, his net worth is estimated to be US$3.3 billion.

In 2025, Harald Link was ranked No. 23 in Thailand in the Forbes list of the world's billionaires.

== Early life and education ==
Link was born in Basel, Switzerland, to Monika (Ruedt) and Dr. Gerhard Link, and grew up in Lübeck, Germany. In 1978, Link received an MBA from University of St. Gallen in Switzerland. In September 2016, Harald Link received an honorary doctorate in Business Administration from the Rajamangala University of Technology Thanyaburi.

== Career ==
Link came to Bangkok, Thailand in 1978 to join his uncle in managing the family firm, B.Grimm, which had been acquired by his paternal grandfather Adolf Link in 1914. He has served as its chairman and chief executive officer since 1987.

In July 2017, Link led the first IPO of a group company, listing the group's power unit B.Grimm Power PCL on the Stock Exchange of Thailand. The company is traded under the ticket symbol BGRIM. The company is considered a major regional player in renewable energy, with hydroelectric, solar and wind projects in the region.

In June 2018, Link announced the construction of Southeast Asia's largest solar energy plant in Vietnam at a ceremony with Thailand Prime Minister General Prayut Chan-o-cha and Vietnamese Prime Minister Nguyen Xuan Phuc.

Since 1998, Link is an independent board director of Siam Cement Group and True Corporation, and serves as the President of the South-east Asian Equestrian Federation.

== Philanthropy ==
One of Link's main philanthropic projects is a German programme for science education called The Little Scientist House, now taught in more than 13,000 Thai schools. In 2010, he became an elected member of the Council of the Thai Red Cross Society.

In 2014, Link's organization B.Grimm partnered with the World Wildlife Fund and its efforts to help recover Thailand's tiger population.

According to Thaizeit.de, for aiding the development of German-Thai trade and economic relations, he was awarded the Federal Cross of Merit First Class, which was given by Ambassador Dr. Hanns-Heinrich Schumacher.

== Political donations ==
In August 2021, Harald Link donated 100,000 Euro to the center-right liberal party Free Democratic Party (Germany) and again in November 2024, Link donated another 100,000 Euro to Free Democratic Party.

== Personal life ==
Link built the largest polo club in Thailand, the Thai Polo & Equestrian Club in Pattaya.

His wife is a titled princess in Liechtenstein. The couple married April 1981 and have two children, Felix and Caroline (both were born in Bangkok), the former serving as president of the group's real estate company. Link reports that he is grooming his daughter Caroline to take over the family business.
