= Chearavanont family =

Thai Chinese business family

Chearavanont เจียรวนนท์ Sae Chia (謝家)
- Parent family: Xie family
- Current region: Thailand
- Earlier spellings: เจียรวนนท์ (Thai)
- Origin: Shantou, China
- Founded: 1921
- Founder: Ekchor Saechia
- Current head: Dhanin Chearavanont
- Heirlooms: Charoen Pokphand

The Chearavanont family (Thai: เจียรวนนท์) is a Thai Chinese business family based in Bangkok, Thailand, with ancestral roots in Shantou, China. The family is noted for its success in business, making it one of the richest ethnic Chinese families in the world. The family owns the Charoen Pokphand (CP) conglomerate, and was ranked by Forbes Asia in 2017 as Asia's fourth-wealthiest family, with a net worth of US$36.6 billion.

The family is currently headed by Dhanin Chearavanont. Dhanin's father, Ekchor Saechia, and uncle, Seowhui Saechia, left China for Bangkok in the 1920s to begin selling seeds and agricultural chemicals. Their business diversified geographically across Asia, and vertically via a number of technology ventures and contract farming initiatives. In the 1980s, as China opened up to foreign firms, the Charoen Pokphand Group became its preferred partner for international brands such as Honda, Walmart, and Tesco.

Dhanin, his three brothers Jaran, Montri, and Sumet, and their cousins collectively own the group, which is one of Asia's largest conglomerates and operates in agriculture, telecommunications, marketing, distribution and logistics, international trading, petrochemicals, property and land development, crop integration, insurance, automotive, and pet foods.

== Family businesses ==
- Ping An Insurance (largest shareholder, world's largest insurance firm by market capitalization, valued at over US$200 billion as of November 2017)
- CP All (second-largest 7-Eleven chain in the world, with over 10,000 stores in Thailand)
- C.P. Fresh Mart (Thailand-based chain selling frozen foods and finished products, with over 700 branches)
- Charoen Pokphand (holding company)
- C.P. Land (manages several Bangkok properties including C.P. Tower 1 & 2; listed through C.P. Land Infrastructure Fund; market capitalization of over US$300 million)
- CP PC (major plastic production manufacturer with plants in Thailand, China, and Vietnam)
- C.P. Pokphand (listed in Hong Kong, one of the world's largest producers of feed and one of China's leading agricultural companies, with factories nationwide)
- Charoen Pokphand Foods (operations in dozens of countries; world's largest producer of shrimp and animal feed; world's third-largest chicken and pork producer)
- Chester's (major fast food chain in Thailand)
- Concordian International School (Thailand)
- Lotus Supermarket Chain (China)
- Dayang Motors (China's third-largest motorcycle manufacturer)
- Magnolia Quality Development Corporation Limited (Thailand)
- Makro (largest cash and carry retailer in Thailand)
- Super Brand Mall (Shanghai)
- True Corporation (joint venture with Telenor, largest internet service provider, cable television network, and third largest wireless carrier in Thailand)
- True Growth Infrastructure Fund (US$2 billion fund set up to manage True's extensive telecommunication assets, including Thailand's largest fibre optic network and largest 3G and 4G cell networks; became Thailand's second-largest initial public offering ever in late 2013; True Corp is True GIF's largest shareholder)

== Notable members ==
- Dhanin Chearavanont
- Suphachai Chearavanont
- Korawad Chearavanont
