= Shantou No.1 High School =

High school in Shantou, China

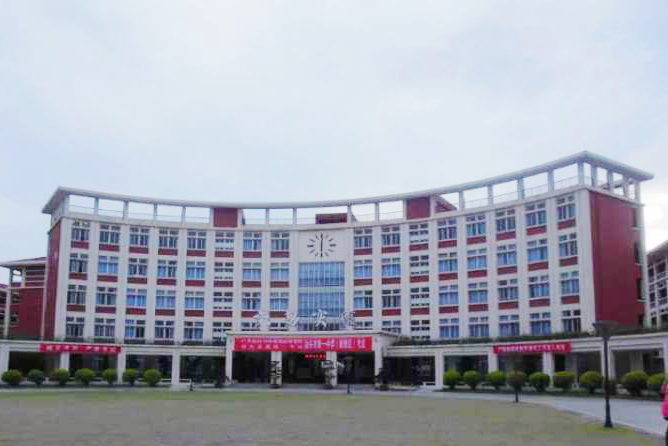
- The new campus of Shantou No.1 High School

Information
- Type: Public senior high school
- Established: 1904
- Principal: Lin Xiping
- Staff: ~377
- Grades: High school grades 1–3
- Enrollment: ~5000
- Website: Official website

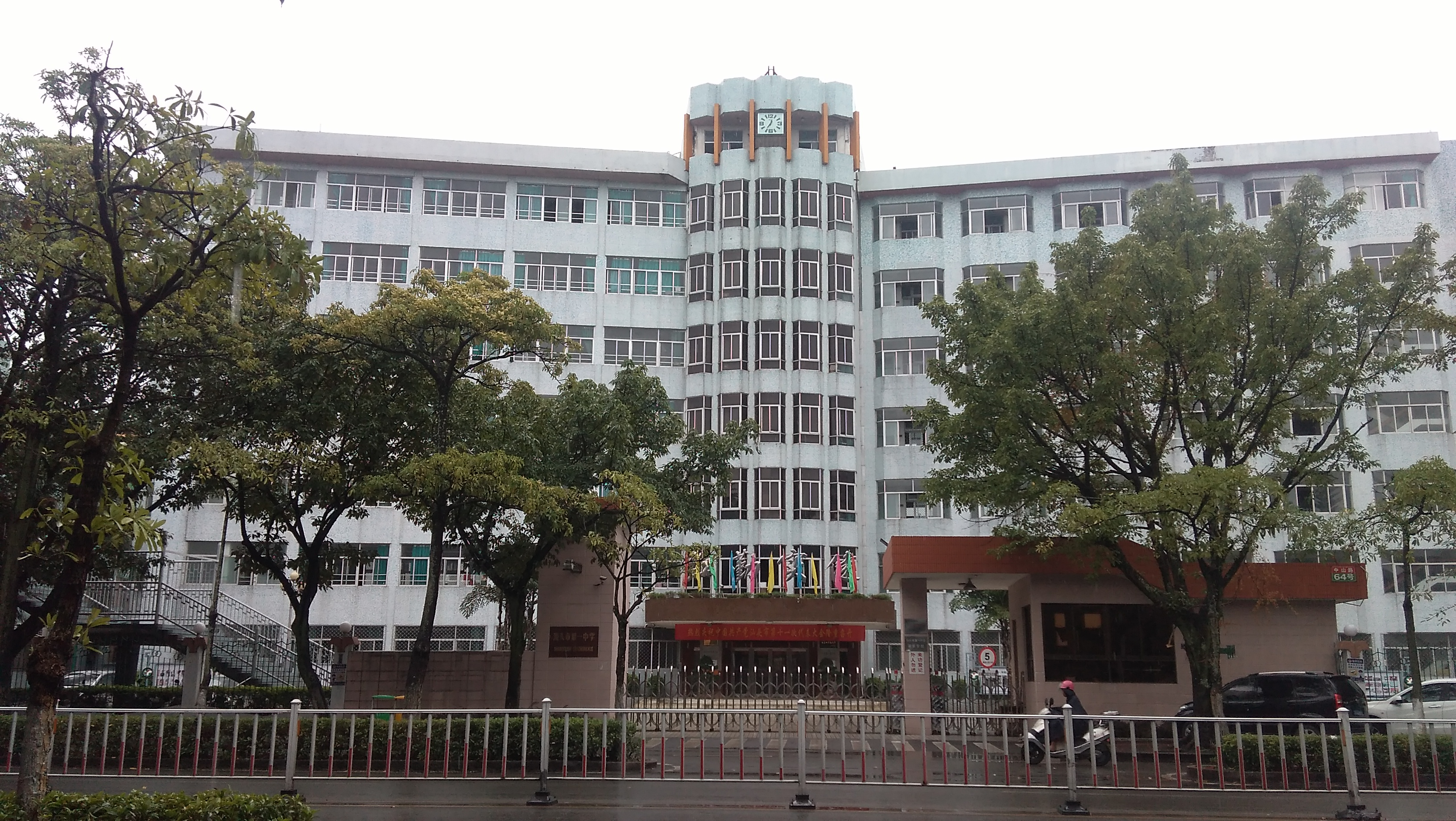
The old campus of Shantou No.1 High School

Shantou No.1 High School (formerly the Anglo-Chinese College and Nanqiang Secondary School) is a high school in Shantou, Guangdong Province, China. It belongs to the first batch schools of first class in Guangdong Province.

== History ==
=== 1904–1949 ===
In 1904, Chen Yuting, a wealthy businessman in Chenghai, devoted money to build Huaying Middle School that was managed by English Presbyterian Mission. It was the original form of Shantou No.1 High School, enabling many poor students to get education. In 1925, two sons of Chen Yuting got the school back through laws, and the name was changed into Nanqiang Middle School.

In 1927, the name was changed again, this time to Shantou No.1 Municipal Middle School. During the Second Sino-Japanese War, this school had moved to Chaoan area, Puning area and other places because of the chaos caused by war. In October 1949, the Shantou People's Government took in charge of it and officially named it Shantou No.1 Middle School. For commemorating Shantou liberation, this school designated October 24 as the day of school anniversary.

=== 1950–2006 ===
Shantou No.1 Middle School was designated as Shantou Key Middle School in 1954. Since the Chinese economic reform, it has entered a new stage of development. First of all, changes took place in the school type. In 1993, this school was appraised as a provincial school. During the next four years, it had gradually changed from a middle school to a high school. In 1997, it totally became a high school, so people call it Shantou No.1 High School nowadays.

In the 1990s, the school built the Shixian Yili Building (世贤伊梨大楼), an auditorium built in a European style.

Shantou No.1 High School has been the window of Shantou because of its cooperation with foreign schools. Especially In the 21st century, this school has established friendly relationship with some schools in Kishiwada, Osaka Prefecture, Japan.In 2000, a delegation was sent by Shantou No.1 High School to visit Osaka comprehensive institution of higher learning, participating in its anniversary. Later, this school sent a delegation to pay an inverted visit to Shantou No.1 High School.

Besides, the plan of building a new campus was raised by the Shantou government in 2005 in order to increase the impact of Shantou No.1 High School. The new campus finished construction in 2006 and was put into use after a year.

=== 2007–present ===
Since March 2007, Shantou No.1 High School has kept the running pattern of two campuses in Shantou. The old campus is a day school, but the new one is a boarding school. Both campuses absorb students from grade one to grade three. Overall, there are around seventy classes in this school, among which more than forty classes are in the new campus and the rest belongs to the old campus. In regard to the numbers of students and teachers, in 2016, about 5,000 students are studying at this school and 377 teachers do some teaching. It is planned that the biggest scale of the school will contain 108 classes and over 6,000 students in the future.

During this period, Shantou No.1 High School has made many achievements in various fields. It has combined study of projects of different levels with class teaching. Besides, by setting creative goals, organizing comprehensive practice activities and implementing other methods, students have been promoted to make achievements in many matches. After operating new curriculum, Shantou No.1 High School students had been participated in 364 competitions and 1,424 students had received awards in three years.

== Campuses ==
Shantou No.1 High School covers an area of around 187,000 square meters. The school has two campuses; one is named the old campus and the other is called the new campus.

=== Old campus ===
The old campus campus is located in the Jinping District. The old campus features a playground at No. 79, Zhongshan Road. The Sanhao Pavilion is situated in the old campus.

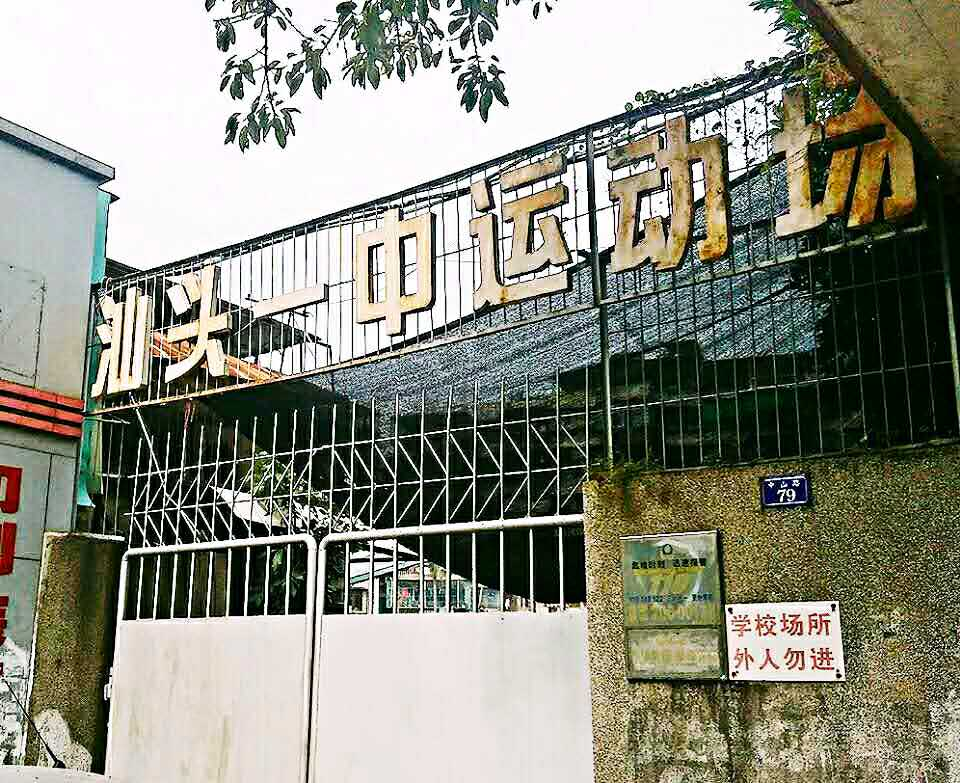
The main playground pre-renovation

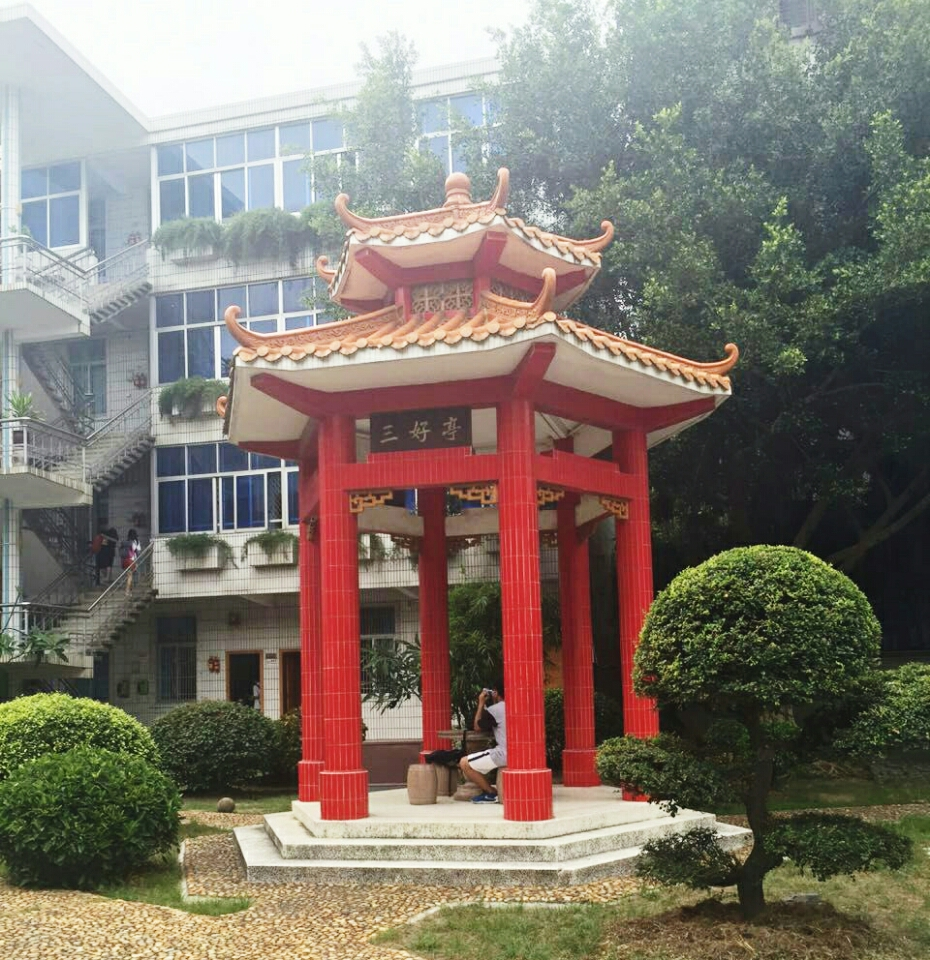
The Sanhao pavilion

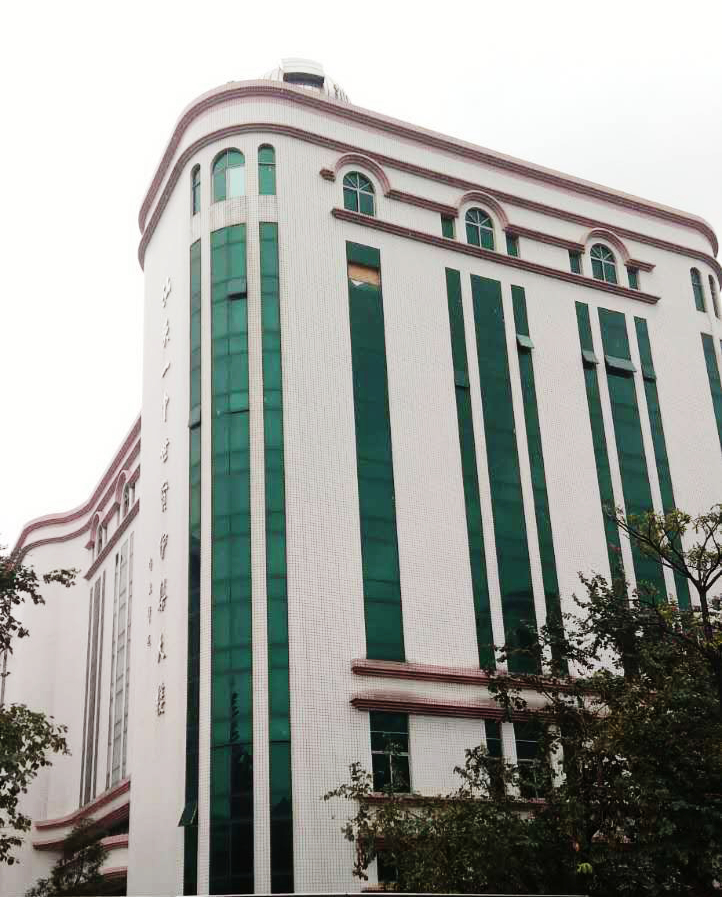
The Shixian Yili building

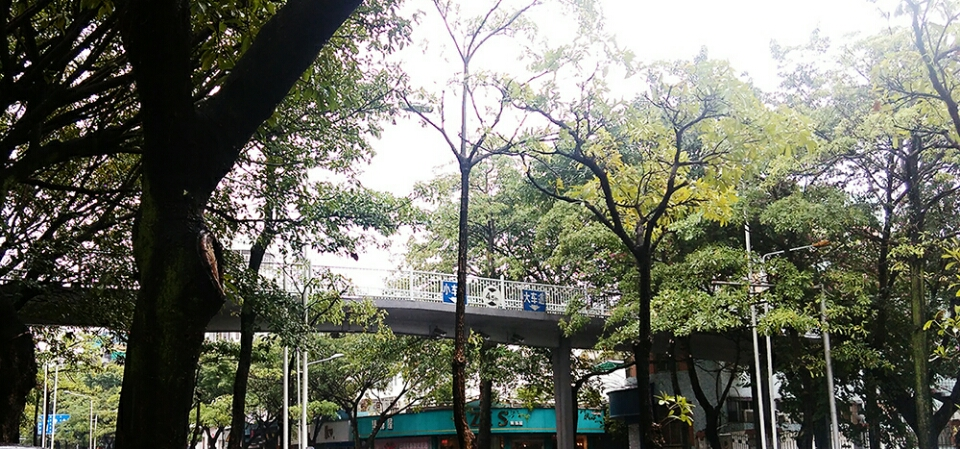
The artificial bridge

=== New campus ===
The new campus lies in the Wan Ji living area in the Longhu District. The new campus is inspired by Lingnan architecture. It features a gymnasium, which also converts into the school hall for assemblies. The new campus has an art building and a library, which are set on the opposite direction of the artificial lake.

The new campus features a number of teaching buildings, connected by special corridors.

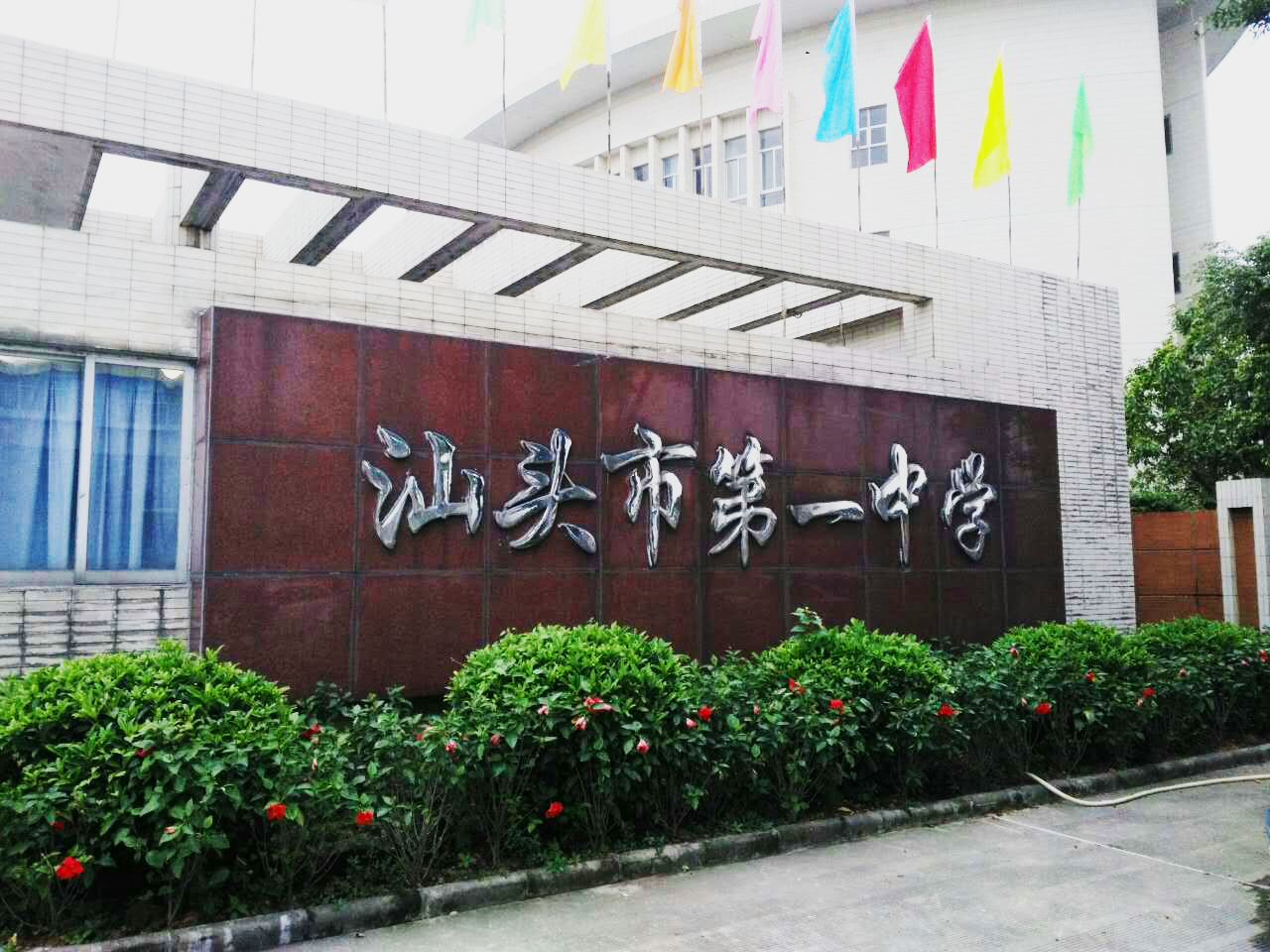
New campus

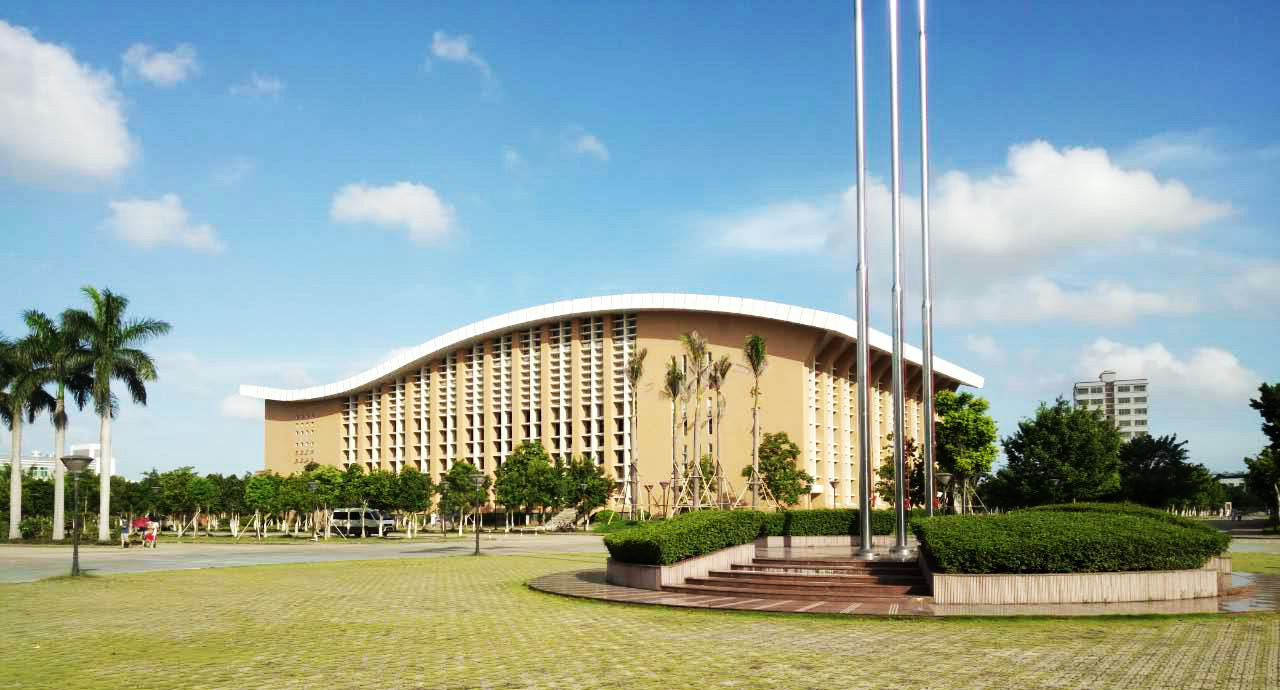
The gymnasium in the new campus

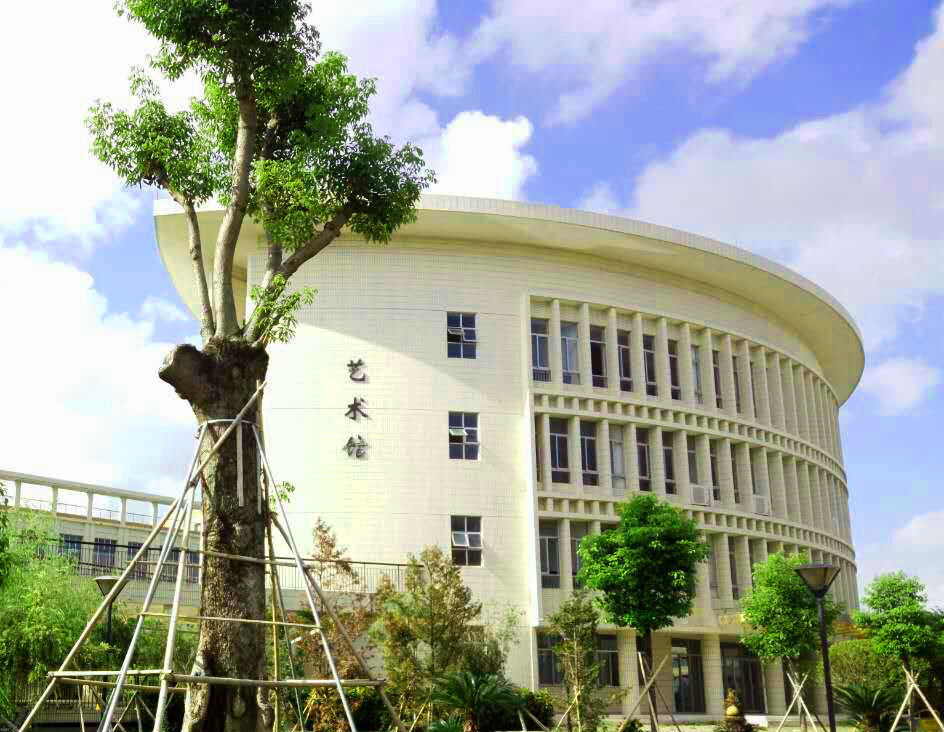
The art gallery in the new campus

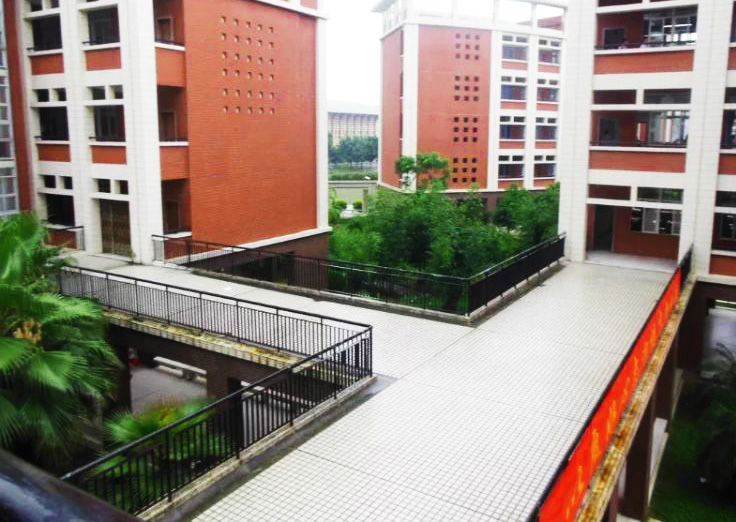
The special corridors in the new campus
