= Ascend Group =

Thai e-commerce company

Ascend Group Co. Ltd.
- Company type: Private
- Founded: 2015; 11 years ago
- Headquarters: Bangkok, Thailand
- Area served: Southeast Asia
- Key people: Punnamas Vichitkulwongsa (CEO); Monsinee Nakapanant (COO); Chaiwat Ratanaprateepporn (CTO); Pumchanut Ruangchainun (CSO); Seubsakol Sakolsatayadorn (General Manager, Ascend Commerce)
- Industry: Internet
- Services: E-commerce, E-payment, Fulfillment and Logistics, Data center and Cloud services, Digital marketing, Venture capital
- Parent: Charoen Pokphand
- Website: Ascend Group

Ascend Group Co. Ltd. is a privately held e-commerce company headquartered in Bangkok, Thailand as a spin-off of True Corporation. It marked its $150-million expansion by launching their affiliates in the Philippines, Indonesia and Vietnam, plus hard to reach economies like Myanmar and Cambodia.

== History ==
Launched in 2014, Ascend Group consolidates True Corporation's previous e-commerce and service ventures, in order to facilitate seamless inter-unit service. Ventures are classified under major subsidiaries: Ascend Commerce, Ascend Money and Ascend Capital, along with smaller independent ventures like TrueIDC and Egg Digital..

In April 2018, Ascend was at the centre of controversy as over 11,000 customers had their data leaked due to the company not protecting their users accounts correctly. The leaks included the ID card information of their customers.

== Subsidiaries ==
=== Ascend Commerce ===
==== WeMall ====
Launched in Thailand as a flagship business to consumer e-commerce platform, iTrueMart serviced an average of 14,000 orders per day in the fourth quarter of 2015. This put it a close second to Lazada Thailand in revenue and competed first for fulfillment options. iTrueMart expanded to the Philippines last November 15, 2015 as its first satellite office, initially serving the Metro Manila and Luzon sector. Services were launched to the island groups of Visayas and Mindanao on April 26, 2016. iTrueMart is ongoing a rebrand as WeMall to also cater to marketplace sellers. iTrueMart PH ceased trading in September 2016 and has since closed the business in the Philippines.

==== Aden ====
Founded in October 2015, Aden has served more than 3 million customers in Thailand. Aden provides warehousing and inventory management. It manages warehouse facilities in Thailand.

==== WeLoveShopping ====
Established as the consumer to consumer platform to cater to resellers and small merchants, WeLoveShopping houses more than 320,000 stores in Thailand. It began as the flagship e-commerce platform of Ascend Group.

==== Pantavanij ====
Founded in 2001, Pantavanij was recently acquired into the portfolio of Ascend Group. C.P. Group, Ascend's parent firm, owns a 90% stake in Pantavanij with Bangkok Bank owning the remaining 10%. It offers business-to-business services, with portfolios extending from consulting, marketplace and government services. s Bangkok Bank Public Company Limited, Siam Cement, and Benchachinda Holdings, PLC forms its core corporate client, along with parent firms of Ascend Group, C.P. Group and True Corporation.

==== Ascend Travel ====
Ascend Travel offers a booking system that blends technology with Thai culture. Mu Travel Tech combines astrology and science to create positive travel experiences. Enjoy “Well Sleep, Feel Great, and Be Auspicious” with their global network, featuring Thailand’s largest selection of budget accommodations.

=== Ascend Money ===
==== TrueMoney ====
TrueMoney was launched as an e-payment and financial service provider, catering to the underserved and unbanked market across Southeast Asia, now serving Thailand as a flagship venture, with presences in Myanmar, Cambodia and Indonesia. In Indonesia, it has partnered with Samsung to fulfill its target of 7,000 electronic data capture (EDC) modules to serve the archipelago of 14,000, and certified as compatible to Islamic banking laws by Indonesia's National Islamic Council. Cambodia launched its services on New Year's Day in 2016 while Myanmar has partnered with Asia Green Development Bank, the same service provider as Myanmar Post and Telecommunications (MPT).

==== Ascend Nano ====
Ascend launched Ascend Nano in April 2016. It includes a nanofinance and microcredit structure, designed to serve the entrepreneurial grassroots, SMEs and the "underserved market".

=== Ascend Capital ===
Ascend Group launched Ascend Capital as a platform for venture capital, investing on tech start-ups that can complement existing ventures and services. Focused mainly on financial technology, e-commerce, CRM, cloud computing and logistics.

==== TrueIDC ====
Launched in 2003 as Ascend Group's data center, TrueIDC provides cloud data storage and computing service geared towards the service needs of Ascend Group and True Corporation. TrueIDC now has ISO/IEC 20000-1, ISC 22301, ISO/IEC 27001, ISO 50001 and CSA Star certifications for IT, information management and cloud safety. It is currently in the process of expanding its data center facility in Hemmaraj Industrial Estate, located in Chonburi, Thailand. TrueIDC also brings its global partners, notably, Amazon Web Services, Microsoft, and Google within reach of Southeast Asian businesses. An overseas expansion was started in Myanmar last September 22, 2015, a first for the formerly reclusive country and owing to its recent economic growth as tight controls eased. Expansions to Cambodia, Vietnam, Laos, the Philippines and Indonesia have been announced, but as of January 2017, no further news has been reported on these ventures.

=== Egg Digital ===
Egg Digital serves as the digital marketing and advertising unit of Ascend to cater to its market and services, along with the needs of its parent firm, Charoen Pokphand.
