= Jon Fredrik Baksaas =

Chairman of GSMA

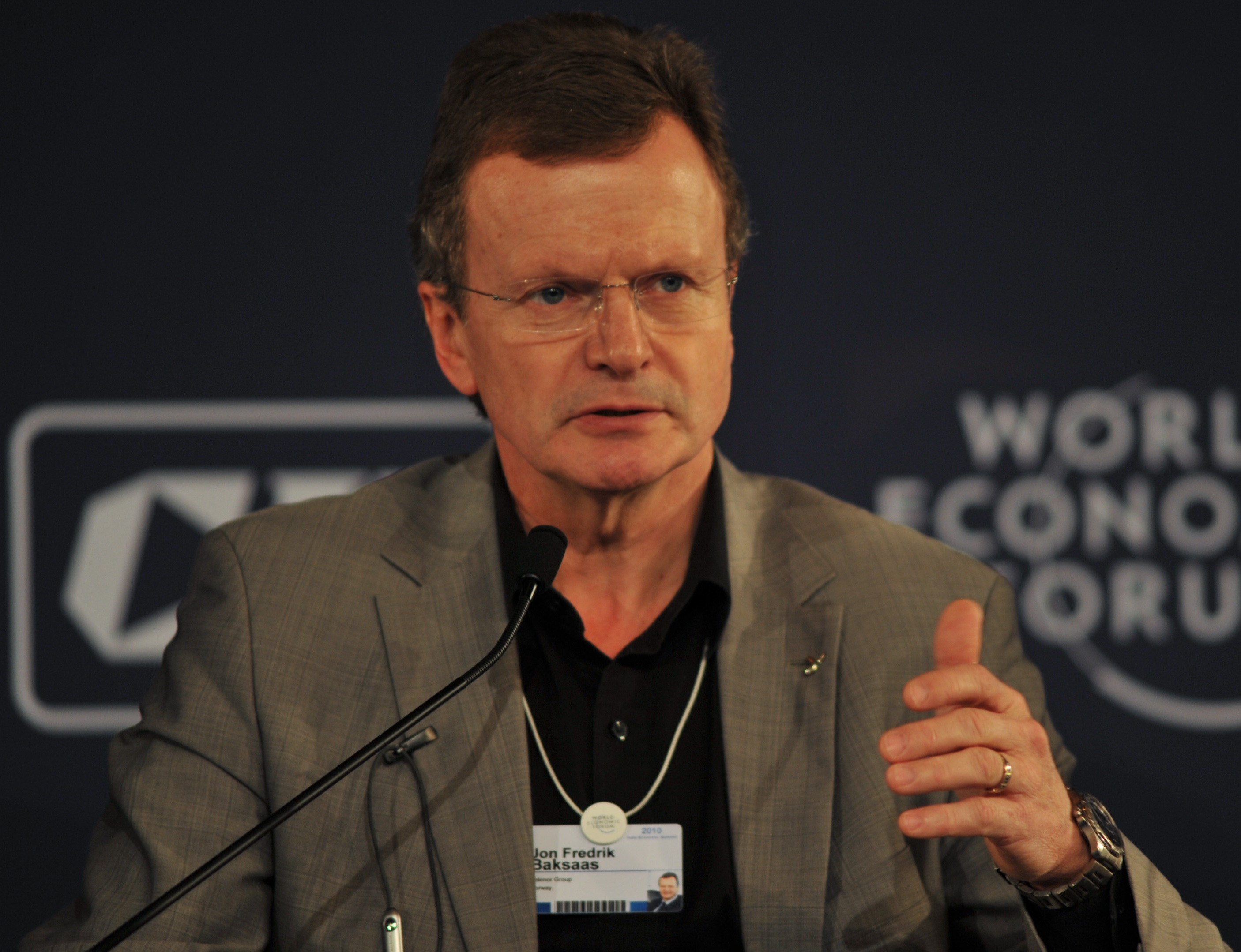
- Born: 1954 (age 71–72); Skien, Norway
- Occupation: Businessman
- Office: Chairman, GSMA

Jon Fredrik Baksaas (born 1954) was the chairman of the GSMA until 2016, and CEO of Telenor until August 2015. He now serves as a special adviser to the telecommunications company's Group Executive Management team.

Among the longest-serving top executives in international telecoms and in Norwegian business life, Baksaas served as president and CEO of Telenor for 13 years, from June 2002 to August 2015. His resignation came under a cloud, as he had acted as one of the primary actors in a bribery and corruption scandal at VimpelCom (where he was a director), in connection with the purchase of wireless licenses in Uzbekistan. Before taking the top position at Telenor, he had served as Telenor’s deputy CEO, CFO, and executive vice president. He joined Telenor in 1989.

== Career ==
Before joining Telenor, Baksaas served as CFO in both Aker ASA, Stolt-Nielsen Seaway and also Det Norske Veritas.

In addition to his previous chairmanship at the GSM Association, he is also a member of the board of Svenska Handelsbanken, VimpelCom and the Advisory Council of Det Norske Veritas.

Baksaas received a Masters of Science degree from the Norwegian School of Economics, and additional executive education qualifications from IMD Business School in Lausanne, Switzerland.

Business positions
| Preceded by Tormod Hermansen | CEO of Telenor; 2002-2015 | Succeeded by Sigve Brekke |
