= CP All =

Convenience store chain in Thailand

CP All Public Company Limited
- Type: Public
- Traded as: SET: CPALL
- ISIN: TH0737010Y08
- Industry: Retail (Convenience stores)
- Founded: 7 November 1988; 37 years ago
- Founder: Charoen Pokphand Group
- Headquarters: Bangkok, Thailand
- Number of locations: 15,430 stores (13 May 2025)
- Area served: Thailand
- Key people: Dhanin Chearavanont (chairman) Korsak Chairasmisak (Chairman of the Executive Committee)
- Revenue: 480 billion baht (est 2017)
- Number of employees: 35,557 (2012)
- Parent: Charoen Pokphand Group
- Website: www.cpall.co.th

CP All Public Company Limited (Juristic Registration: 0107542000011) was established in 1988 by the Charoen Pokphand Group to operate convenience store businesses in Thailand under the 7-Eleven trademark. The company was granted a license to use the trademark by 7-Eleven, Inc., USA. In 1989, the first 7-Eleven outlet in Thailand was opened on Patpong Road.

== History ==
CP All PLC was established in 1988 by the Charoen Pokphand Group. The company is the sole operator of 7-Eleven convenience stores in Thailand, which has been granted exclusive rights from 7-Eleven, Inc. to conduct business under an area license agreement.

== Operations ==
As of 13 May 2025, the company has a total of 15,430 7-Eleven stores nationwide, of which 51 percent of stores were company-owned, 49 percent franchise stores and sub-area license stores.

In 2017 CP All spent 20 billion baht to open 710 new branches and renovate its existing stores, IT facilities, and open its new distribution centre. Revenues in 2017 are projected to be 480 billion baht.

== Executive malfeasance ==
Insider trading by CP All executives occurred in 2013, according to a statement by Thailand's Securities and Exchange Commission (SEC) on 2 December 2015. Korsak Chairasmisak, the vice chairman of CP All, at that time was its CEO. He bought over 118,000 shares of Siam Makro (the company is now known as CP Axtra), a cash-and-carry chain, over a 12-day period ending on 22 April 2013. The following day, CP All announced a tender offer for Siam Makro shares at 15 percent above the 22 April close. The regulator found that Korsak had prior knowledge of the deal and imposed a fine of over 30 million baht (US$833,000). Three executives also involved were fined 3.1 million baht. No criminal charges were brought. CP All's audit committee said they had decided it was "appropriate for the individuals to continue" their employment. As justification, the statement cited their prior behavior and performance and their "exceptional skills and experience, which would be difficult to replace".
