= WeMall =

Thai e-commerce platform

- Company type: Private, subsidiary
- Headquarters: Bangkok, Thailand
- Area served: Southeast Asia
- Industry: Online retail
- Services: E-commerce
- Parent: Ascend Group
- Website: WeMall Thailand iTrueMart Philippines

WeMall, formerly iTrueMart, was an ecommerce platform headquartered in Bangkok, Thailand. The platform was owned by Ascend Group Co. Ltd., and primarily sells electronics, appliances, and personal care products.

== History ==
iTrueMart was first launched in 2014 and initially operated in Thailand. A Philippine subsidiary, iTrueMart Philippines, was launched on November 15, 2015; it initially served the Luzon region and later expanded to Visayas and Mindanao on April 23, 2016 before ultimately shutting down on September 9, 2016.

Logo of iTrueMart before rebranding to WeMall

The original Thailand platform remained in operation and was rebranded WeMall on July 6, 2016.

As of January 3, 2024, WeMall describes itself as "shut down until further notice[.]"
