= B.Grimm =

Multinational conglomerate based in Bangkok, Thailand

- Type: Private
- ISIN: TH7545010004
- Industry: Energy, Building & Industrial Systems, Healthcare & Lifestyle, Transportation, Real Estate, Digital
- Founded: 1878; 148 years ago
- Founder: Bernhard Grimm; Erwin Mueller
- Headquarters: Bangkok, Thailand
- Area served: Thailand; Malaysia; Vietnam; Laos; Cambodia; Philippines; Germany
- Key people: Harald Link (Chairman) (CEO); Caroline Link
- Revenue: ▲$3+ billion (2015)
- Owner: Link family
- Number of employees: 2,000+
- Website: bgrimmgroup.com

B.Grimm Group (Thai: บี.กริม) is a multinational conglomerate founded in 1878, based in Bangkok, Thailand. The large-scale conglomerate is active in healthcare, energy, building and industrial systems, real estate, e-commerce, and transport; with 22% annual growth in recent years. The company is wholly owned and operated by the Link family. The chairman and CEO, Harald Link, is a noted polo player and philanthropist.

== History ==
B.Grimm was founded in 1878 when German pharmacist Bernhard Grimm and his Austrian partner, Erwin Mueller, started a chemist's shop, the Siam Dispensary, on Oriental Avenue off New Road. The shop, one of the earliest incorporated businesses in the country, prospered and it was soon appointed official pharmacist to the Thai royal family.

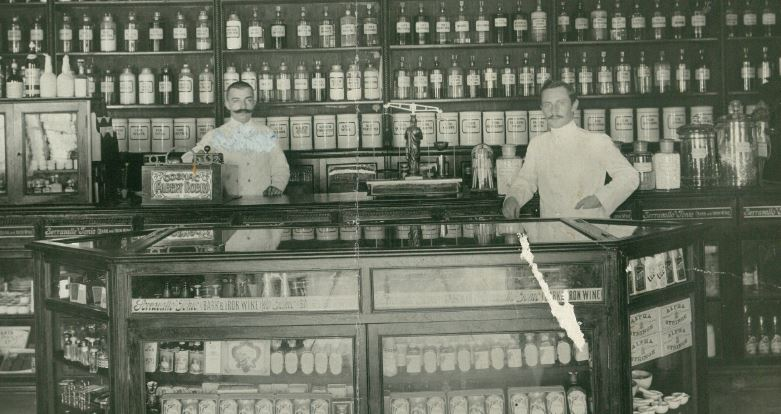
Siam Dispensary

As early as 1900, the company had secured a partnership with global heavyweights like Siemens Corporation. In 1903, Adolf Link was hired as a manager to help expand the growing business. After King Chulalongkorn returned from his grand tour in Europe, he began putting in place measures to modernize the country to bring it more in line with European nations.

Following the outbreak of World War I, all of the assets in Siam (then Thailand) of Adolf Link, a German national, were seized on orders of the British government and was sent with his wife, Erma, and their two children, Herbert and Gerhard, to concentration camps in India.

The Links had much credibility in Thailand and they knew the Thais had not taken away their assets on their initiative. The family returned to Thailand in 1920 after the war had ended in 1918. In 1928, Prince Bhanurangrsi built on his property the new premises for the company at Wang Burapha, and King Prajadhipok and Queen Rambhai Barni presided over the opening of the new offices.

Herbert Link reopened the company in Thailand in 1949, while brother and partner Gerhard remained in Germany to help expand the B.Grimm name in Europe. In 1953, Gerhard Link was appointed Thailand's honorary consul and later its consul general in Hamburg.

Over the next decade, the brothers expanded the business so that by 1964 it included engineering and equipment for healthcare, power generation, telecommunications, air conditioning, and mechanical engineering.

The Princess Mother opened the company's new offices and warehouse on New Petchaburi Road in January 1967. In 1975, Herbert's wife, Alma, was bestowed the title of Khunying (equivalent to 'Dame') by the King Rama IX in recognition of her work for various charitable foundations. She was the first foreign woman to receive such an honor in Thailand.

In 1988, Dr. Gerhard Link's son Harald Link expanded B.Grimm into power generation, manufacturing, and real estate, and also forged joint ventures with some of the world's largest corporations.

Harald Link, who had been raised in Germany and had graduated from University of St. Gallen business school, had joined his uncle Herbert in Thailand in 1978 to help manage the growing business. He moved to Thailand with his wife, Princess Assunta of Liechtenstein, a descendant of Prince Aloys of Liechtenstein.

In 1992, the company built new factories and work also began on another new head office. Soon afterward, B.Grimm expanded into power generation, bio-diesel production, and the lifestyle industry. The company has since expanded into power generation which now accounts for 80% of total revenues.

Forbes magazine reported that Harald Link's daughter, Caroline Link, is being trained to play a key part in the business. She was named as one of "12 women to watch" by Forbes.

== Logo ==
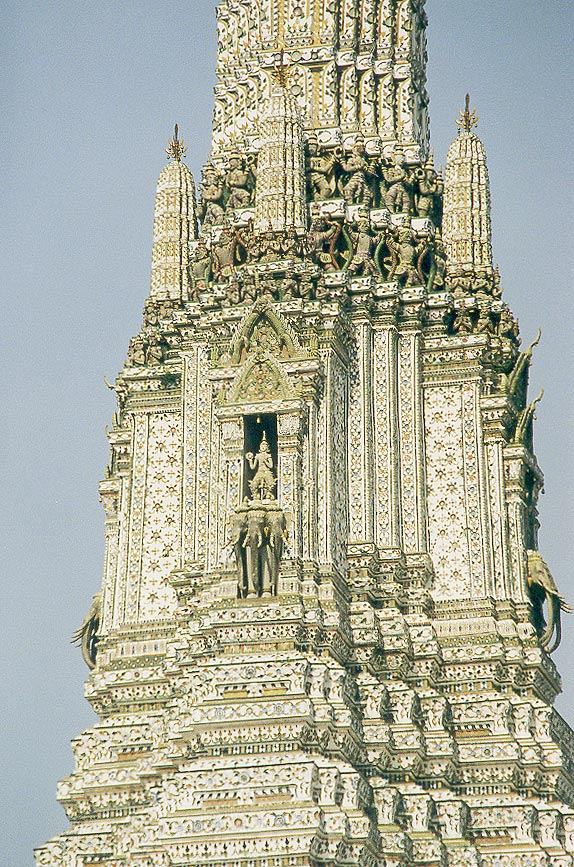
Wat Arun Phra Prang, source of B.Grimm's logo

B.Grimm's logo comes from the Phra Prang of Wat Arun ('Temple of Dawn'). A prang is a Buddhist tower-like spire, usually richly carved, that was especially symbolic during Thailand's Ayutthaya Kingdom (1350–1767) and Rattanakosin Kingdom (1782-1932). Phra Prang was selected as the company's logo as the site of the first B.Grimm & Co. by the Chao Phraya River overlooked the Phra Prang of the Temple of Dawn.

== Businesses ==
=== B.Grimm Power PCL ===
B.Grimm Power was created on 26 July 1993 and was listed on the Stock Exchange of Thailand (SET) on 19 July 2017. It trades under the symbol SET: BGRIM.

B. Grimm owns and operates more than 20 power plants in Thailand, four in Laos and one in Vietnam, through its subsidiary Amata Power. Amata Power is a joint-venture between Amata and the Sumitomo Corporation, with the majority stake owned by B. Grimm. It builds and operates power plants in Thailand, Laos, and Vietnam, providing electricity and steam for national power grids as well as nearly 200 large manufacturers. Of these industrial parks, the Amata City Industrial Estate received a prize for "Best distributed generation project" in 2015.

Eighty-five percent of B.Grimm's production capacity is gas powered combined cycle cogeneration plants. However, B.Grimm has expanded their renewable generation (wind, solar, hydro) and are on track to double capacity within the next few years. Another five power plants in Thailand are under development, as well as four renewable plants abroad. B.Grimm Green Power, majority owned by B.Grimm in a joint-venture with STRR Engineering Co., Ltd., produces biodiesel in Chumphon Province.

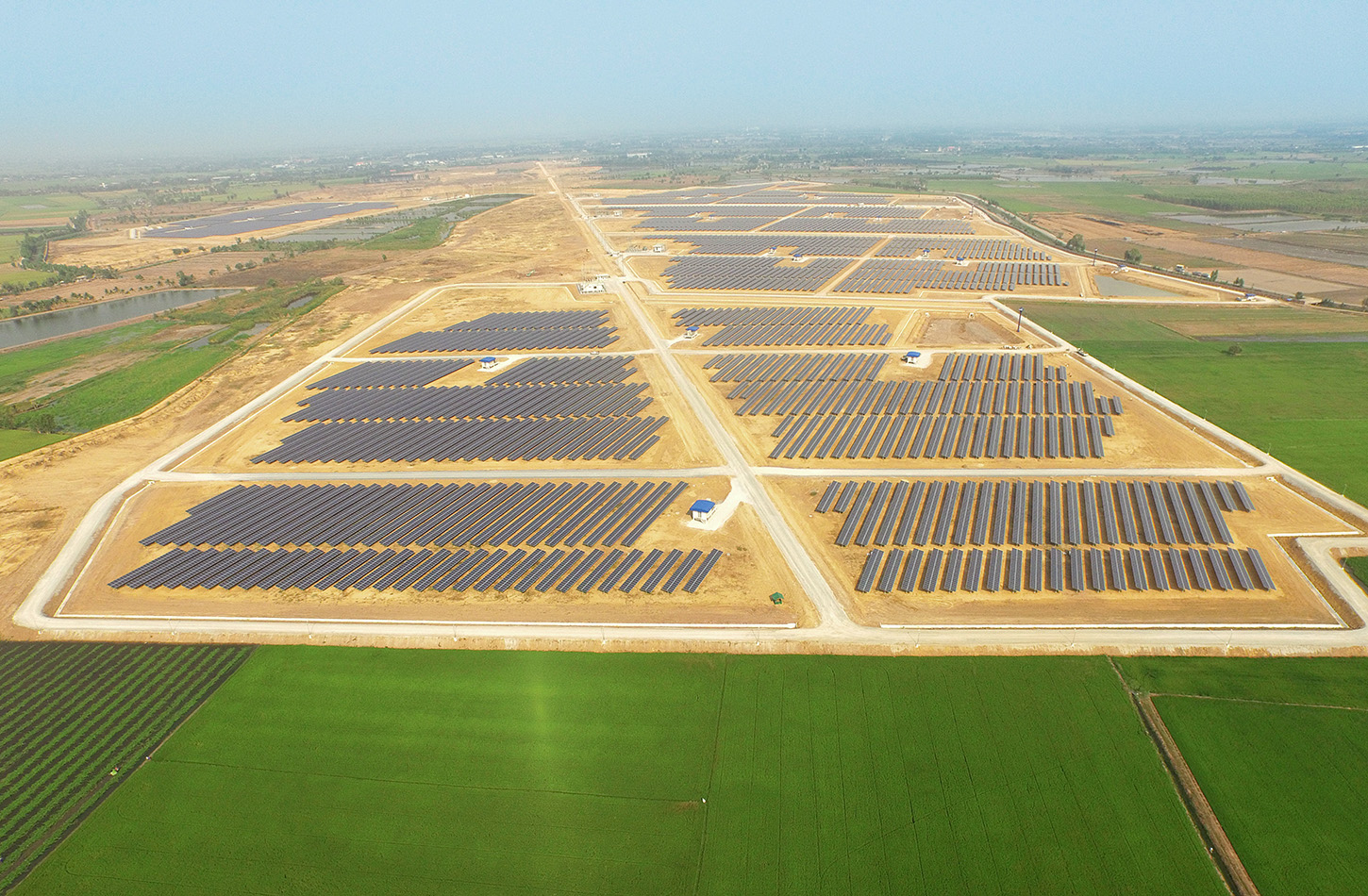
B.Grimm Yanhee solar power plant, Nakhon Pathom, Thailand

B.Grimm Power had revenues of 37.3 billion baht for their fiscal year 2018 ending 31 December. They showed a net profit of 1.9 billion baht, and assets of 100.6 billion baht. Bualuang Securities projects the company's revenue will rise to 44.6 billion baht in FY2019, with profits rising to 9.2 billion baht. At FY2018 year-end, B.Grimm Power had 869 employees.

=== Building and industrial systems ===
B.Grimm distributes air conditioners through a joint venture and licensing arrangements with US-based Carrier Corporation. The company also provides parts for air conditioning and refrigeration units through a joint venture with Beijer of Sweden, Beijer B.Grimm (Thailand). B.Grimm also manufactures Carrier commercial and light-commercial air conditioning systems at its air conditioner factory.

Other partnerships include Siemens Limited, a leader in electrical engineering; Hamon, a leader in cooling towers for power plants; KSB Pumps, which provide pumps for energy-related industries, and B.Grimm Trading Corporation, supplying energy equipment to industries and buildings.

Hamon B.Grimm Co., Ltd. is a joint venture with Hamon Group of Belgium, manufacturers of large cooling towers in power generation and the petrochemical industry. The company, in operation since 1993, is engaged in local subcontract fabrication of parts for and installation of cooling towers and as such operates in synergy with B.Grimm for the marketing and distribution for large industrial and infrastructural equipment.

=== Healthcare ===
The company is a distributor of foreign healthcare devices through partnerships with Merck, Getinge, Siemens, and Carl Zeiss.

=== Real estate ===
B.Grimm has developed two high rise office buildings: the Alma Link Building, located in the central business district, and the Dr. Gerhard Link building, located in eastern Bangkok near Suvarnabhumi Airport. The company has begun the development of a 600-acre real estate project in Pattaya.

=== Internet ===
B.Grimm is the majority owner of online financial comparison platform, Masii.com, which launched in February 2016.

=== Transport ===
Bangkok's Airport Rail Link was built in 2005 by a consortium of B.Grimm, STENCON, and Siemens. The line connects Bangkok's Suvarnabhumi Airport to the city center. The line operated by SRTET (SRT Electric Train Company), is a wholly owned subsidiary of the State Railway of Thailand (SRT). The cost of the project was 25.9 billion baht.

== Gross National Happiness ==
On the 12 October 2016, Her Royal Highness Ashi Kesang Choden Wangchuck of Bhutan agreed with B.Grimm to establish the Gross National Happiness Centre of Thailand. The agreement marks the world's first Gross National Happiness Centre outside of Bhutan since being established in 1972. A key mission of the centre is to "pursue and achieve collective happiness by building a more peaceful, sustainable and harmonious world."

== Polo ==
B.Grimm is involved in recreational and charity-based polo events through Thailand. The company frequently hosts international polo competitions including the annual BMW-B.Grimm Thai Polo Open 2015 from the Asia League. Proceeds often go to educational charity endeavors such as the Chitralada Vocational School.

B.Grimm's Chairman and CEO Harald Link established the Thai Polo Club in Pattaya in 1990.
