= Somphote Ahunai =

Thai billionaire

- Education: Joseph M. Katz Graduate School of Business
- Occupations: Businessman, Entrepreneur
- Known for: Founder of Energy Absolute

Somphote Ahunai is a Thai billionaire. He made his fortune from his founding of the renewable energy firm Energy Absolute. He has overseen the expansion of the firm into electric cars (Mine Mobility) and a gigafactory. He graduated from the Joseph M. Katz Graduate School of Business, and began his career in security trading. He resides primarily in Bangkok. His firm has been likened to the "Tesla of Asia."
