= True Corporation =

Thai telecommunications company

True Corporation Public Company Limited
- Trade name: True (since in 2004)
- Formerly: TelecomAsia (1990–2003)
- Type: Public
- Traded as: SET: TRUE
- ISIN: THB231010000
- Industry: Telecommunication; Consumer electronics
- Predecessor: Total Access Communication
- Founded: 13 November 1990; 35 years ago
- Founder: Suphachai Chearavanont
- Headquarters: Bangkok, Thailand
- Area served: Thailand
- Key people: Sigve Brekke (Chairman); Manat Manavutiveth (President and CEO); Sharad Mehrotra (President and CEO)
- Products: Mobile phone; Smartphones; Set-top box; Tablet computer
- Services: Cable television; mobile; internet
- Revenue: ▼140.94 billion baht (2019)
- Operating income: ▼7.1 billion baht (2019)
- Net income: ▼5.64 billion baht (2019)
- Total assets: ▲523.99 billion baht (2016)
- Total equity: ▼126.02 billion baht (2019)
- Owners: Arise Ventures Group (24.95%); Thai NVDR (11.87%); Charoen Pokphand (9.04%); China Mobile (7.81%)
- Number of employees: 23,000
- Divisions: True Mobile
- Subsidiaries: see Subsidiaries
- Website: www.true.th (True) www.dtac.co.th (DTAC)

True Corporation Public Company Limited (stylized as true) is a communications conglomerate in Thailand. It is a joint venture between Arise Ventures Group and Charoen Pokphand Group, formed by the merger between the original True Corporation and Dtac in the form of equal partnership to create a new telecommunications company that can fully meet the needs of the digital age. True controls Thailand's largest cable TV provider, TrueVisions, Thailand's largest internet service provider True Online, Thailand's largest mobile operators, True | dtac which is second to only to AIS. and entertainment media including television, internet, online games, and mobile phones under the True Digital brand. As of August 2014, True, along with True Telecommunications Growth Infrastructure Fund, had a combined market capitalization of US$10 billion. TrueMove is also a partner of Vodafone. Charoen Pokphand Group and Telenor hold equal ownership of 30% of True's shares as of March 2023. It operates fixed-line (as a concessionaire of NT), Wireless, satellite and cable TV, IPTV and broadband services.

== History ==
True Corporation was established on 13 November 1990 as TelecomAsia. The company had a partnership with Verizon. The company was listed on the Stock Exchange of Thailand on 22 December 1993. In 2001, TelecomAsia set up mobile phone subsidiary TA Orange with Orange SA. Orange sold off its stake in 2003 but the Orange brand was used until 2006.

In an effort to converge TelecomAsia's telecommunication business into a single brand, the company renamed itself to True Corporation in 2004, and streamlined its operations with subsidiaries Asia Infonet (renamed True Internet) and Orange (renamed True Move in 2006).

In 2005, True took a higher stake in UBC, Thailand's largest cable television provider that time, and renamed the company to UBC-True. On 24 January 2007, UBC-True was renamed TrueVisions.

On 8 May 2013, TrueMove H became Thailand's first mobile operator to provide 4G LTE commercial service on the 2100 MHz bandwidth.

On 11 September 2014, it was announced that China Mobile agreed to purchase 18 percent of its shares for US$881 million.

On 13 November 2014, TrueMove H announced that it allocated 10 billion baht to expand its 4G LTE network in Thailand to cover 80 percent of the country's population.

In June 2015, Suphachai Chearavanont, True's President and CEO, was presented with the "2015 Frost & Sullivan Asia Pacific Telecom CEO of the Year" award in Singapore for his leadership and achievements in developing the telecommunications industry in the Asia Pacific region. In the same month, Chearavanont was elected president of The Telecommunications Association of Thailand.

On 22 November 2021, Charoen Pokphand and Telenor, officially announced they have agreed to explore a USD 8.6 billion merger plan between Thailand's second and third largest telecom operators (by subscribers), True Corporation (TRUEE) and Total Access Communication (DTAC) – The proposed merger is subject to regulatory approvals. The merger is expected to be completed by late-September 2022. The merger was "acknowledged" by the regulator NBTC at a meeting on 20 October 2022. The newly merged company still retain the True Corporation name, which was founded on 1 March 2023 and it was listed on the Stock Exchange of Thailand under the stock ticker symbol TRUE on 3 March 2023.

== Subsidiaries ==
True Corporation includes the following subsidiaries

- TrueOnline (Broadband / fixed line business)
- TrueVisions (Pay TV and Mass Media business)
- True Digital (Television, Internet, Online games, and Mobile phones)

== Alleged government collaboration ==
Thai activists have charged that True, Thailand's largest ISP, shared dissidents' internet account details to the junta in the aftermath of the 2014 Thai coup d'état. It is impossible to corroborate that True shared dissidents' data with law enforcement, but Thai governments since 2007 have sought to curb online criticism by passing legislation that compel ISPs to deploy online surveillance and censorship technologies. True's privacy policy allows it to share data with law-enforcement authorities.
