= Charoen Pokphand =

Conglomerate of Thailand

Charoen Pokphand Group Co., Ltd. เครือเจริญโภคภัณฑ์
- Type: Private
- Industry: Conglomerate
- Founded: 1921; 105 years ago
- Headquarters: Bangkok, Thailand
- Area served: Worldwide
- Key people: Dhanin Chearavanont (senior chairman); Soopakij Chearavanont (chairman); Suphachai Chearavanont (CEO)
- Products: Agro-industry; Food industry Manufacturing
- Services: Real estate development Retail; Investment; Telecommunications; E-commerce
- Revenue: ▲US$111.4 billion (2025)
- Owner: Chearavanont family
- Number of employees: ▲460,00 (2025)
- Subsidiaries: Ping An (9.19%); CP ALL; Charoen Pokphand Foods; True Corporation (19.72%); Ascend Group; Super Brand Mall; CP Axtra; Dayang Motors
- Website: www.cpgroupglobal.com

The Charoen Pokphand Group Company, Ltd. (Thai: เจริญโภคภัณฑ์; RTGS: Charoen Phokkhaphan; also commonly known as CP) is a Thai conglomerate based in Bangkok. It is Thailand's largest private company and the largest privately held Royal Warrant holder of the Thai Royal Family. The company describes itself as having eight business lines covering 14 business groups. As of 2025, the group has investments in 21 countries.

It owns controlling stakes in Charoen Pokphand Foods (CPF), the world's largest producer of feed, shrimp, and a global top three producer of poultry, pork, among other agricultural produces. It also operates Southeast Asia's largest retail business by revenue, with over 15,245 7-Eleven stores the second largest in the world after the 20,000 stores in Japan and a leading cash and carry business through CP Axtra, formerly known as Siam Makro. In the telecommunications sector, CP Group subsidiary, True Corporation, is one of the largest telecom firms in Southeast Asia with over 48.8 million mobile customers.

With some 200 business subsidiaries in mainland China, CP Group is known in China as "Zhèng Dà" (正大 - "positive" or "upright"). When China opened up its economy in 1978, the CP Group was the first foreign investor in the country and became the first foreign company registered in the special economic zone of Shenzhen, Guangdong. The company is the single largest investor in mainland China today commanding over a fifth of China's entire feed meal market. The corporate registration number was "0001." Through its extensive investments, CP Group has been credited with changing the country's dietary habits and leading China's green revolution.

== History ==
Charoen Pokphand traces its beginnings back to 1921. when immigrant brothers Chia Ek Chor (謝易初) and Mat U Ramus (謝進賢), hailing from Swatow, China, started a seed store named Chia Tai Chung on Song Sawat Road in Bangkok's Chinatown during the reign of King Rama VI. They imported seeds and vegetables from China and exported pigs and eggs to Hong Kong, Taipei, Kuala Lumpur, and Singapore. The two brothers, who were virtually penniless, managed to scrape together enough capital to start their tiny seed shop. For the first few years of the businesses existence, the two brothers experimented to find their own market niche. By the 1950s, the shop began to specialize in exporting animal feed, particularly for chickens but the business struggled until the 1970s when the Bangkok Bank asked it to assume control of a bankrupt chicken farm. The shop later specialized in purchasing grown chickens for distribution to grocers and restaurants with vertically integrated strategy of feed-milling operations with chicken breeding. In 1969, the company had an annual turnover of US$1–2 million.

When the Thai economy was liberalized in the 1970s, the CP Group entered various business negotiations with several major Thai banks, the Thai government, and foreign firms. The CP Group would supply Thai farmers with chicks and feed and teach breeders how to raise chickens while the farmers would sell the grown chickens back to the CP Group which processed the chickens and sold them to high volume grocery stores, restaurants, and fast food franchises across Thailand. The CP Group expanded internationally exporting their contract farming formula across Southeast Asia and around the world to Mexico, Taiwan, Portugal, mainland China, Indonesia, Turkey, and the United States. By the 1980s, with Thailand becoming a full blown capitalist economy, the CP Group entered the aquaculture business, turning their formula to raising and marketing shrimp.

The company increased its scope from selling vegetable seeds under the trademark of Rua Bin ("Aeroplane") to production of animal feed under Ek Chor's two elder sons, Jaran Chiaravanont and Montri Jiaravanont. The company further integrated its business to include livestock farming, marketing, and distribution, under Dhanin Chearavanont. By the 1970s, the company had a virtual monopoly on the supply of chicken and eggs in Thailand. The company was known for vertical integration, expanding into several business lines, adding breeding farms, slaughterhouses, processed foods production, and, later, its own chain of restaurants. CP had also gone international, launching feed mill operations in Indonesia in 1972, exporting chickens to Japan in 1973, then moving into Singapore in 1976.

In the 1980s, as mainland China opened up to foreign direct investment, the firm became the preferred partner for international brands such as Honda, Walmart, and Tesco. CP's family ties with the mainland enabled it to become the first foreign company to establish itself in the newly created Shenzhen Special Economic Zone, where the company set up its Chia Tai Co. (Chinese: 正大集团; pinyin: Zhèngdà Jítuán) subsidiary. In 1987, the company acquired the rights to the 7-Eleven convenience store chain and the KFC fast food restaurant chain. The company would also expand into Shanghai by manufacturing motorcycles under license from Honda and brewing beer with a license from Heineken. In 1989, CP entered the petrochemical business with Solvay of Belgium to launch Vinythai Co., a manufacturer of polyvinylchloride. In 1990, the CP Group acquired a stake in TelecomAsia, a joint venture with US telecommunications firm NYNEX to build and operate two million telephone lines in Bangkok worth some $3 billion. The CP Group also acquired interests in satellite launch, cable television, and mobile telephone services.

By the early-1990s, CP presided over some 200 subsidiaries in China. CP's investment in poultry production on the mainland was credited with changing the country's dietary habits, as per capita consumption more than doubled by the end of the decade. Starting in 1993, many subsidiaries went public. TA, Charoen Pokphand Feedmill, Siam Makro, and Vinythai were listed publicly on the Stock Exchange of Thailand (SET); its Hong Kong subsidiary, CP Pokphand, on the Hong Kong Stock Exchange; a Shanghai-based animal feed and poultry group on the Shanghai exchange; a real estate development arm, Hong Kong Fortune, on the Hong Kong Exchange; and Ek Chor China Motorcycle on the New York Stock Exchange. Having been listed on the Hong Kong Stock Exchange since 1981, CP Lotus, a retail arm of CP Group in China, opened its first store in Shanghai in 1997.

After the Asian financial crisis in 1997, CP consolidated into three business lines under its main brands: foods (CP Foods), retail (7-Eleven), and telecommunications (True). By the early-2000s, the CP Group claimed $9 billion in business assets. The company sold its stakes in the Tesco Lotus venture with Tesco in 2003 due to its crisis policy in order to focus on 7-Eleven, in which, unlike Tesco, CP owns a majority, as its flagship retail arm.

In 2013, Charoen Pokphand has got clearance to buy HSBC's stake of Chinese Ping An Insurance. On 10 May 2013, in spite of a lack of loan from the China Development Bank, HSBC said "it was selling the 15.6 percent stake at HK$59 a share" to Charoen Pokphand Group.

In 2014, CP announced a tie-up with the Japanese general trading company Itochu under which CP acquired 4.9 percent of Itochu's listed stock for about US$1 billion, and Itochu in turn acquired a 25 percent stake in a Hong Kong-listed CP group company, CP Pokphand Co., for about $854 million. This transaction made CP the third-largest shareholder in Itochu, and was marketed as an alliance between the two conglomerates with a focus on developing international food trading opportunities. In 2015, CP and Itochu announced that they would jointly take a $10.4 billion stake in China's CITIC Limited, forming a trilateral alliance with Itochu and CP each holding 10 percent of CITIC's stock, one of the largest foreign investments in a Chinese state-owned company.

On 9 March 2020, CP Group submitted the winning bid to purchase Thai retailer, Tesco Lotus, for about $10.6 billion. The purchase needed the approval of the Office of Trade Competition Commission (OTCC) as it could constitute a monopoly, given that CP already owns 7-Eleven convenience stores and the Makro cash-and-carry business. The sale became approved in Malaysia in November 2020 and in Thailand in December 2020, with rebranding of the acquired stores beginning in February 2021, replacing the Tesco corporate branding with that of Lotus's.

In February 2021, CP Group was recognized as one of the World's Most Ethical Companies 2021 award from Ethisphere Institute, a global institution for evaluating ethical business standards.

In September 2021, CP Group raised $150 million from existing investors, raising the valuation of its Ascend Money subsidiary to $1.5 billion.

In November 2021, CP Group and Telenor Group announced an agreement to form an equal partnership to support the merger of True Corporation and Total Access Communication (dtac). The aim was to create a new tech company that would contribute to Thailand’s strategy of becoming a regional technology hub, focusing on digital infrastructure and innovation.

In 2023, Siam Makro Public Company Limited officially changed its name to CP Axtra Public Company Limited (CPAXT). The rebranding was intended to clarify its business scope, which includes both wholesale and retail operations, and to support the company’s long-term growth under CP Group.

== Subsidiaries ==
=== Charoen Pokphand Foods ===
Known as Charoen Pokphand Foods Plc., (CPF). It was established in 1978 with operations in animal feed production, livestock breeding, further processing and trade. Currently, CPF invests overseas in nine countries, has subsidiaries in 17 countries and exports to over 40 countries. Furthermore, CPF is today the leading producer of feed and one of the largest producers of poultry in the world. Charoen Pokphand Foods is listed in the Stock Exchange of Thailand under the code: CPF.

CPF reported sales revenue of approximately US$17.8 billion in 2024, with a market capitalization of over $5.9 billion that same year.

=== CP ALL ===
CP ALL Public Company Limited is the flagship company of the Charoen Pokphand Group's marketing and distribution business. It has been the Thai licensee of 7-Eleven since 1989 and operates 15,245 convenience stores under that trademark in Thailand. This is the third largest number of stores after the United States and Japan.

=== 7-Eleven ===
CP All Plc. is the sole operator of 7-Eleven convenience stores in Thailand. The CP Group acquired the rights to distribute the convenience store in 1987. The first 7-Eleven outlet was opened in 1989 on Patpong Road in Bangkok. As of 2020, the company had a total of 11,700 stores nationwide employing 170,000 workers. Of the total, 4,245 stores are in Bangkok and vicinity (44 percent) and 5,297 stores are in provincial areas (56 percent). There are 4,205 corporate-owned stores (44 percent), 4,645 franchise stores (49 percent), and 692 sub-area license stores (seven percent). An average of 11.7 million customers visit 7-Eleven stores each day. In 2016, the company expanded another 710 new stores both as stand-alone stores and stores at PTT gas stations. At the end of 2014, the company had 8,210 stand-alone stores (86 percent) and 1,332 stores in PTT gas stations (14 percent). The company planned to open approximately 700 new stores annually, with the goal of 10,000 stores in 2017.

In 2024, there were 15,245 7-Eleven branches in Thailand, and in 2025, the company plans to invest in opening an additional 700 branches.

=== CP Axtra ===
CP Axtra Public Company Limited is a key retail and wholesale subsidiary of Charoen Pokphand Group, operating under the brands Makro and Lotus's. Established in 1988 as Siam Makro, the company opened its first store in Bangkok in 1989 and was listed on the Stock Exchange of Thailand in 1994. In 2022, CP Axtra underwent a significant restructuring by amalgamating with Ek-Chai Distribution System Co., Ltd., the operator of Lotus's stores, consolidating its wholesale and retail operations under one entity. As of 2025, CP Axtra operates over 305 large-format stores across Thailand.

=== True Corporation ===
The Telecommunications Business Group was established during the late 1980s. Known as True Corporation Plc, True offers a "convergence" of voice, video and data services across its integrated communications platform. Based in Bangkok, True currently services more than 23 million subscribers to its various services, which includes Thailand's third-largest mobile operator (TrueMove), the country's largest broadband and dial-up internet provider, largest fixed-line phone operator in Bangkok Metropolitan Area, electronic cash and payment services, personal communication telephone, data services, VoIP services, online portals, online games and is the only nationwide cable-TV provider (TrueVisions). True Corporation is listed on the Stock Exchange of Thailand under the code TRUE.

True Corporation generated approximately US$3.1 billion in revenue in 2012, it had a market capitalization of about $4.3 billion in 2013. It is spinning off its infrastructure operations into a new telecommunications fund set to IPO at about $1.8 billion, putting the group's total value at about $5 billion.

On November 22, 2021, Telenor and Charoen Pokphand Group, officially announced they have agreed to explore a US$8.6 billion merger plan between Thailand's second and third largest telecom operators (by subscribers), True Corporation (TRUE) and Total Access Communication (DTAC) – The proposed merger is subject to regulatory approvals. The merger was "acknowledged" by the regulator NBTC at a meeting on October 20, 2022. The newly merged company still retain the True Corporation name, which was founded on March 1, 2023, and it was listed on the Stock Exchange of Thailand under the stock ticker symbol TRUE on March 3, 2023. Q1/2025 True Corporation is one of the largest telecom firms in Southeast Asia with over 48.8 million mobile customers.

=== Ascend Group ===
Founded in 2014 as a spin-off of True Corporation, Ascend Group handles the e-commerce, online retail, logistics and fulfillment component of CP Group. It marked its $150-million expansion by launching their affiliates in the Philippines and Indonesia, Vietnam, and also hard to reach economies like Myanmar and Cambodia. Ventures are classified under major subsidiaries: Ascend Commerce, Ascend Money and Ascend Capital, along with smaller independent ventures like TrueIDC and Egg Digital.

=== Lotus Supercenter ===
CP Lotus Corporation is a retail operation in China.

=== C.P. Pokphand Co., Ltd. ===
Listed in Hong Kong, CPP is one of the world's largest producers of feed and one of China's leading agricultural companies with factories nationwide.

=== CP Fresh Mart ===
A Thai-based chain selling frozen foods and finished products, now with over 700 branches.

=== Dayang Motors ===
One of China's leading motorcycle producers Dayang Motors, recently signed a joint venture to begin production of cars in Thailand. Its motorcycles are exported to Southeast Asia, Europe, and Africa.

=== Solvay ===
In 1989, CP entered the petrochemical business through a joint venture with Solvay, one of Belgium's largest chemical firms. But, it later sold its stakes.

=== Wal-Mart ===
In 1994, CP signed a joint venture agreement with American retail giant, Wal-Mart to establish super-retail stores throughout Asia and later dissolved it.

=== CP Beverages & Food ===
CP B&F is the Beverages arm of CP and was established in 2016 in Bangkok, Thailand. It operates Cafes, QSR, Logistics Brands namely Arabitia Cafe, Jungle Cafe, Farmee, Daily Runner and also is into Export - Import Business. The company now operates in 5 countries - China, Thailand, India, Cambodia, Laos and Myanmar and has 5 subsidiaries - CP B&F India Pvt Ltd, CP B&F (Thailand) Co. Ltd, CP B&F (Cambodia) Co., Ltd. In September 2020, CP B&F (Vietnam) Private Company Limited has been established in Vietnam.

=== SAIC Motor-CP ===
SAIC Motor-CP Co., Ltd. is a 50-50 joint venture between CP and Chinese automotive manufacturer SAIC Motor. It produces MG vehicles in a manufacturing plant in Chonburi. MG vehicles are distributed in Thailand by MG Sales (Thailand) Co., Ltd.

=== CP Future City Development Corporation Limited (CPFC) ===
CP Future City Development Corporation Limited (CPFC) is a fully-integrated real estate company, a subsidiary of C.P. Group, established in 2021 to develop Makkasan then expanded to handle other projects claiming $14 USD billion in deveolopment assets and currently managing 800,000sqm of space, CPFC core businesses focus on property development, investment and management.

== Shrimp feed supply chain traceability and audit ==
CP Foods produces and sells farmed shrimp. It does not own or operate any fishing vessels. The company has worked to improve the traceability of the fishmeal element of its supply chain since 2012, and broadened this effort to encompass a full traceability system for its farmed shrimp supply chain in 2014. As part of that process, CP Foods has reduced the number of suppliers who provide fishmeal for the production of shrimp feed.

CP Foods has undertaken a full independent, third-party audit of its shrimp feed supply chain (all the way back to the individual fishing boats catching fish for fishmeal production), conducted by an international supply chain audit company. It's approved by-product fishmeal in shrimp feed is certified "IFFO RS CoC".

=== Shrimp Sustainable Supply Chain Task Force ===
CP Foods is a founding member of the Shrimp Sustainable Supply Chain Task Force (SSSC), established in July 2014, which has convened food producers, international retailers, and NGOs to map out a holistic improvement and audit plan for the Thai shrimp industry, and to identify and agree the steps and timetable to increase the sustainability and transparency of the supply chain. The key aim of CP Foods and the SSSC is to ensure that abuse of workers and damage to the maritime ecosystem in the Gulf of Thailand and Andaman Sea is a thing of the past, and to restore trust in the industry.

A U.S. court dismissed the lawsuit against Costco and CP Foods over allegations of selling Thai prawns linked to forced labor. The court ruled that the plaintiffs failed to prove the companies had a legal duty to disclose labor conditions in their supply chains and could not directly link the prawns they purchased to sources using illegal labor. CP Foods stated that it does not support forced labor and does not own the fishing vessels referenced in the allegations.
