= Dhanin Chearavanont =

Thai businessman and entrepreneur (born 1939)

Dhanin Chearavanont MPCh MVM PBh ThCh
- ธนินท์ เจียรวนนท์ 謝國民
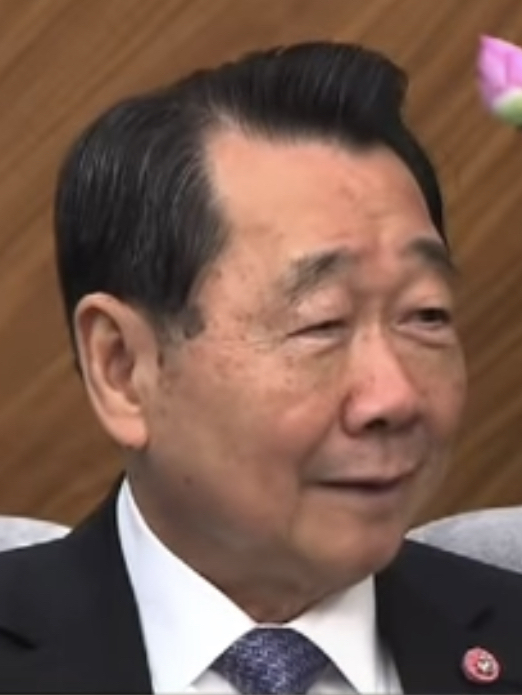

Member of the Senate of Thailand
- In office 22 March 1992 – 21 March 1996

Personal details
- Born: Kokmin Saechia; 19 April 1939 (age 87) Bangkok, Siam
- Party: Independent
- Spouse: Tewee Wattanalikit (1962–2023)
- Children: 5, including Suphachai
- Occupation: Senior chairman, Charoen Pokphand

Dhanin Chearavanont (Thai: ธนินท์ เจียรวนนท์; RTGS: Thanin Chiarawanon; born 19 April 1939), known in Chinese as Xie Guomin, or Chia Kok Min in Teochew (Chinese: 謝國民; pinyin: Xiè Guómín, Peng'im: zia^{7} gog^{4} min^{5} ), is a Thai businessman and entrepreneur. He is the senior chairman of Charoen Pokphand, Thailand's largest private company. Dhanin is head of the Chearavanont family, which was ranked by Forbes Asia in 2017 as Asia's fourth-wealthiest family with a net worth of US$36.6 billion. As of January 2021, his net worth was estimated at $17.2 billion. By July 2021 Forbes stated Dhanin and his brothers were worth to be US$12.8 billion, and in July 2022, Forbes ranked the Chearavanont Brothers as the richest in Thailand.

== Early life and education ==
Dhanin Chearavanont was born in 1939, as the fourth and youngest son of Chia Ek Chor. Dhanin attended primary school at the Chinese Sarasit Wittaya school in Ban Pong District, Ratchaburi province, until graduating in 1949. In 1952, he travelled to China to study at Shantou No.1 High School, before travelling to the Education University of Hong Kong where he pursued higher education in 1956 including training from the National Defence College of Thailand.

== Business ==
Chearavanont built a close relationship with leadership of Chinese Communist Party, which allowed his business CP to be the largest foreign lessee of land in China, amounting to 200,00 hectares of land in 2012.

== Philanthropy ==
In 2020, Dhanin donated US$21.8 million to fight the spread of COVID-19 in Thailand.

== Personal life ==
He is a follower of Buddhism.
