= E-commerce in China =

China is the world's largest market for e-commerce. Domestic e-commerce firms have the greatest share of China's market, with foreign companies having a comparatively small presence. The expansion of e-commerce in China has resulted in particular e-commerce patterns like the development of Taobao villages and livestreaming e-commerce.

E-commerce in China is regulated through a variety of means, particularly China's 2018 E-Commerce Law.

== Expansion of E-commerce ==
In the early 2000s, China's e-commerce lagged behind that of other major economies. When the 2008 financial crisis resulted in decreased demand from Western markets, Chinese manufacturers re-oriented towards the domestic market. Many focused on domestic online marketing, either through creating their own brands or selling to other Chinese online sellers. In turn, this pivot by Chinese manufacturers increased the quantity and diversity of products available online, leading to a major increase in e-commerce in China. In 2008 alone, online retail sales in China increased by a factor of 26.

Since 2013, China is the world's largest e-commerce market. Its domestic e-commerce market was an estimated US$899 billion in 2016. China accounted for 42.4% of worldwide retail e-commerce in that year, the most of any country.In 2019, online retail sales were 21% of China's total retail sales. As of late 2022, approximately 850 million Chinese individuals shop online and sectors related to e-commerce employ 69 million people in the country. In 2023, nearly 50% of worldwide online sales took place from China.

The rapid rise of e-commerce in China is facilitated by mobile payment systems such as Alipay and WeChat Pay. These payment platforms help simplify the transaction process and ensure the security of transactions to win the trust of consumers. Therefore, the mobile payment system has completely changed the daily life of the Chinese people and the future business model. The rise of e-commerce has in turn facilitated the rapid adoption of digital payment and mobile wallets.

The expansion of Chinese e-commerce has also prompted the growth of an efficient express delivery industry. As of 2020, express delivery companies served 98% of all Chinese townships and half of all villages. In that same year, Chinese express delivery accounted for 83 billion parcels, which was more than half of the global total.

E-commerce contributed substantially to China's COVID-19 pandemic response by facilitating fast delivery of personal protective equipment, food, and daily use consumer goods during lockdowns.

Since 2020, cross-border e-commerce has expanded significantly and Chinese sellers have increased their presence on non-domestic platforms like Amazon.

The expansion of e-commerce in China is an example of leapfrogging development. Although China was a latecomer to e-Commerce in comparison to other major economies, it has now grown beyond them in both total market size and on a per capita basis.

== E-commerce patterns ==
Domestic companies like Alibaba, JD.com, and Pinduoduo have the largest share of China's e-commerce market. Foreign companies like Amazon and EBay have not gained significant shares in the market. Because of this, Alibaba's Taobao/Tmall ecosystem captures around 46% of the market share with platforms like the B2B site Alibaba and consumer retail JD.com holding around 27% with their ability for same day delivery and control of logistics domestically. With many of these companies having their own payment applications like AliPay and WeChat pay they are able to prevent entry from foreign companies. AI adoption is another significant trend for many Chinese companies. In 2017, Kuo Zhang became the President of Alibaba.com and oversaw many policies that prioritized AI integration, supplier verification, and cross-border SME enablement. In 2024, he launched an AI sourcing agent called Accio Work that uses natural-language search and automated supplier comparisons to reduce manual procurement processes. Zhang also drove Alibaba.com’s transformation into a transactional, AI-enabled global-trade platform. He introduced AI foreign-trade tools including Business Assistant and OKKI AI, expanded supplier-verification and trust mechanisms, pursued logistics and payments partnerships, and later broadened Accio into an agent platform for sourcing, storefront operations, analytics, and compliance. In 2025, he also expanded third-party supplier verification tiers (verified and assessed suppliers) to increase reliability in B2B transactions. His focus remained on simplifying global trade for small businesses and providing support for the creation of online stores, etc. In 2025, Zhang set the target of 100% merchant adoption of AI tools by the year-end. Kuo Zhang in 2026 argued that agentic AI will eventually lead to solo founders who can create one-person unicorns, where a single entrepreneur can run a billion-dollar global business by delegating work tasks to AI agents. Alibaba subsequently reported substantial growth in AI usage, including more than 10 million monthly active users for Accio (before Accio Work was launched) by March 2026, but did not publicly confirm that the 100% adoption target had been achieved. There is a real economic push by China as multiple local government agencies are providing cash subsidies to fund One-Person-Companies (OPC's). The subsidy includes rent-free office space, free housing, and computing credits. The Wuxi high-tech zone is offering 500,000 yuan for startups building industrial AI applications.

In 2015, the State Council promoted the Internet Plus initiative, a five-year plan to integrate traditional manufacturing and service industries with big data, cloud computing, and Internet of things technology. The State Council provided support for Internet Plus through policy support in area including cross-border e-commerce and rural e-commerce.

E-commerce in China is primarily platform based. China's major e-commerce platforms do not sell their own products, but instead host tens of millions of third party sellers which are often small enterprises or microbusinesses. The vast majority of sellers are individuals doing business. The majority of e-commerce sales in China are non-branded products or lesser known brands.

Direct sales through online retail and livestreaming have created a new channel for rural economic opportunities. The expansion of e-commerce in China has resulted in the development of Taobao Villages, clusters of e-commerce businesses operating in rural areas. Because Taobao villages have increased the incomes or rural people and entrepreneurship in rural China, Taobao villages have become a component of rural revitalization strategies. E-commerce also benefits rural people more broadly through the consumption effect of lowering costs of living and therefore enhancing purchasing power. By bringing economic benefits to remote and economically challenged villages, e-commerce decreases cross-regional inequalities in China. In 2015, the Ministry of Finance allocated 2 billion RMB to establish e-commerce centers in some of the least developed areas of China.

An analysis by academic Lizhi Liu published in 2024 finds that cities with economies traditionally reliant on natural resources (such as Daqing and Yulin) rank among the Chinese cities with the lowest level of e-commerce development. Liu describes this as an example of resource curse.

The increase in e-commerce in urban areas has led to loss of sales for brick and mortar stores. In turn, this has led to an increase in the "new retail" concept, which seeks to tie online and offline shopping experiences together, for example by allowing customers to try products in offline "experience stores" that they can then order online.

Some local governments have created e-commerce platforms in an effort to facilitate sales of local products. With the exception of the business-to-business platform Yiwugo.com (created by the Yiwu city government and a state-owned enterprise), these platforms have not been commercially successful.

Livestreaming e-commerce in China was initiated by fashion e-commerce platform Mogujie in 2016. In the same year, it was picked up and gradually made popular by Alibaba, who turned live commerce into a fixture in its annual Singles' Day shopping festivals. The livestreaming trend has particularly benefited sales of agricultural products through e-commerce, with streamers presenting live tastings.

Chinese e-commerce spending peaks every year during Singles' Day, which is the world's largest online shopping event. By 2025, live streaming commerce accounted for about a quarter of overall Singles' Day sales, prompting Alibaba to double down on Taobao Live as a core sales channel rather than spending on other marketing. In 2025, the company announced a 110 billion yuan upgrade to its Taobao Live ecosystem, including billions in consumer red envelopes and integrated large language models into Taobao and Tmall search and recommendations ahead of the 2025 Singles' Day pre-sales.

The online platforms of cross-border e-commerce serve as significant venues for language services. The analytical approach to their language services involves conducting field studies on typical cross-border e-commerce platforms and their language service partners, focusing on analyzing the development models and service models of their language services. Some translations lack an in-depth understanding of the target market's culture and consumption habits, resulting in content that is rigid and poorly adapted to the local context, thereby negatively impacting user experience and brand perception.

== Regulatory framework ==
According to a 2024 book by academic Lizhi Liu, the e-commerce boom in China occurred because of weak government institutions, not despite them, with gaps in government institutions resulting in the development private institutions for contract enforcement, fraud detection, and dispute resolution with the government acquiescing to or encouraging the development of these institutions. The lack of formal regulatory institutions led to significant development of private e-commerce institutions dealing with contract enforcement, anti-fraud, dispute resolution, and inexpensive loans.

Significant development to China's regulatory framework governing online transactions occurred after e-commerce had boomed. The government was generally hands-off in its regulatory approach until 2020. A period of intense regulatory scrutiny and action followed from 2020 until mid-2023. After that point, the government decreased its regulatory intervention and issued policies more supportive of the e-commerce sector.

In 2004, China passed an Electronic Signature law which was based largely on the United Nations model. The law encouraged the use of electronic signatures in e-commerce.

In 2015, the State Administration of Taxation prohibited local tax authorities from inspecting e-commerce businesses. Online sellers are obligated to pay taxes as brick-and-mortar businesses do, but because of their generally small size, comparatively fewer online sellers meet the revenue threshold to pay taxes.

China passed its E-Commerce Law in 2018 following five years of significant debate among numerous stakeholders. Chinese policymakers encouraged wide participation in the legislative process, including seeking input from a wide variety of non-state actors including private tech businesses. In Article 7, the E-Commerce Law states that "the state shall establish a collaborative administration system" in which e-commerce industry associations, e-commerce businesses, and others jointly participate. The law describes e-commerce platforms as important market entities and states the principle that "the state regulates the platforms, and the platforms regulate online businesses". Among other provisions, the law states in Articles 58 through 63 that platforms should establish online dispute resolution systems among other online institutions. It requires that online sellers register with the state and provides exceptions designed to facilitate small scale business, such as registration exceptions for those selling self-produced agricultural products or family handicrafts. The E-Commerce Law, along with other regulatory provisions relevant to e-commerce, is part of the broader mandate of the State Administration for Market Regulation.

The E-Commerce Law, along with the Consumer Protection Law, require e-commerce platforms to take proper action if they are aware or should be aware of fraudulent online behavior by merchants, including the sales of fraudulent goods. If merchants are found to have sold counterfeit goods, the Consumer Protection Law imposes a penalty of three times their value to compensate consumers. If platforms have prior knowledge of counterfeit goods being sold, then the E-Commerce Law makes them jointly liable with merchants engaged in sale of such goods. These risks also prompted platforms to take a stricter view towards shanzhai products.

In the event of contract disputes over e-commerce, the question of jurisdiction can be uncertain. The Civil Procedure Law states that contract disputes shall be "under the jurisdiction of the people's court of the place where the defendant has his domicile or where the contract is performed". Chinese courts have taken different views about whether "the contract is performed" where the e-commerce buyer or the e-commerce seller are located. Courts also rely on platform user agreements, which sometimes state that the court of the defendant's domicile have jurisdiction.

In 2019, the city of Hangzhou established a pilot program artificial intelligence-based Internet Court to adjudicate disputes related to e-commerce and internet-related intellectual property claims.

China prohibits the practice of review brushing, which is regarded under e-commerce laws and regulations as a form of false advertising.

Chinese policymakers frame data as a "key" factor of production, comparable to land, labor, capital, and technology, thereby requiring an increased level of state control.

== See also ==
- Conversational commerce
- Digital economy
- Internet in China
- Shein
- Taobao
- Timeline of e-commerce
- Tmall
- Types of e-commerce
- Vipshop
- Xiaohongshu
- E-commerce in other Asian countries:
  - E-commerce in India
  - E-commerce in Pakistan
  - E-commerce in Southeast Asia
  - E-commerce in Sri Lanka
- E-Commerce elsewhere in the Global South:
  - E-commerce in Mexico
