= E-commerce in Sri Lanka =

Sri Lanka had an internet user base of about 6 million as of July 2016, about 28.2% of the population. Despite being a developing country, the E-commerce industry has been receiving funding over the span of 10 years. Market conditions in Sri Lanka are similar to those in India, as cash on delivery is the most preferred payment method.

According to experts, Sri Lanka’s annual domestic E-commerce sales value including services is an estimated US$40 million. This is expected to grow to US$400 million by 2022. Currently, only 0.4% of Sri Lanka’s total annual retail sales (US$10 billion) is in e-commerce.

== Government involvement ==
The Government of Sri Lanka has shown interest in promoting the country's e-commerce industry further.

== See also ==
- E-commerce in other Asian countries:
  - E-commerce in China
  - E-commerce in India
  - E-commerce in Pakistan
  - E-commerce in Southeast Asia
- E-Commerce elsewhere in the Global South:
  - E-commerce in Mexico
