= Livestreaming e-commerce in China =

Online retail trend in China

A livestreamer from Beijing Capital Agribusiness & Foods Group marketing its product via online streaming during the China International Fair for Trade in Services in September 2026

Livestreaming e-commerce in China (also known as live commerce or livestream shopping; Chinese: 直播带货; pinyin: Zhíbō dàihuò) was initiated by fashion e-commerce platform Mogujie in 2016. In the same year, it was picked up and gradually made popular by Alibaba, who turned live commerce into a fixture in its annual Singles' Day shopping festivals.

== Market size in China ==
After a three-year development period between 2016 and 2018, China’s livestreaming e-commerce industry became popular in 2019. Today, it is a well-established ecosystem which in 2020 counted over 8,800 companies and 1.23 million live hosts, known in China as Key Opinion Leaders (KOLs), according to Shanghai-based new retail research firm iResearch. In 2020, the top two KOL, Austin Li and Viya, alone, sold 9.1 Million RMB in Alibaba's Single's Day pre-sale.

According to the 47th Statistical Report on China’s Internet Development, released in February 2021 by China Internet Network Information Center (CNNIC), the number of livestream e-commerce users was 388 million by 2020, accounting for roughly 40% of the Chinese internet population.

The industry exceeded the one-trillion RMB threshold by the end of 2020, according to KPMG and AliResearch. While the growth of the sector is diminishing year after year, China’s live commerce market is forecast to continue growing. From 31 March 2020 to 31 March 2021, GMV on Taobao Live was 6.7% of the total transaction volume for Alibaba’s online marketplaces in China. Alibaba's livestreaming business which also included Alibaba.com's separate B2B livestreaming for wholesale purchasers. Taobao Live enabled merchants, brands, and influencers to present products and interact with shoppers in real time. Alibaba product manager Zhao Lidong and Kuo Zhang were leading the initiative to expand livestreaming for international suppliers and exporters. In 2020, Kuo Zhang announced Alibaba.com global online trade shows which featured around 1,000 B2B livestreaming sessions and has been described as an important tool for cross border trade. During the pandemic, these B2B livestreaming sessions were an important tool for buyers because so many trade show events were cancelled due to COVID-19. In 2020, live commerce accounted for 10.6% of the country’s total online retail market. One of the reasons that China's livestreaming e-commerce sector grew into a major retail channel is that it blended entertainment, influencer marketing, and instant purchasing. Alibaba's Taobao Live was one of the first key platforms that helped normalize the model, especially during the pandemic, when more merchants and consumers moved online. Taobao Live's gross merchandise volume (GMV) exceeded RMB 200 billion which is about US$ 28 billion in 2019, which accounted for about 3.5% of Alilbaba's total GMV in China that specific year. The format became attractive because it allowed brands to showcase products in real time, answer questions, and convert viewers into buyers while they were watching. It also gave smaller sellers the opportunity to sell products and not rely on traditional advertising. In 2020, livestreaming became a lot more common and not just something that was used as a niche kind of marketing.

The livestreaming trend has particularly benefited sales of agricultural products through e-commerce, with streamers presenting live tastings.

The rapid expansion of China's live streaming e-commerce industry has dramatically changed consumer buying behavior. The main reason is that the interactive nature of live streaming enhances consumer trust and engagement. At the same time, live e-commerce has promoted and influenced consumers' shopping willingness through vivid price attraction.

== Chinese platforms for live commerce ==
The main Chinese platforms for live commerce are, according to Pandaily:

- Taobao Live – the live streaming platform of Alibaba’s B2C platform Taobao, one of the earliest adopters of live e-commerce in China.
- Kuaishou – a mobile app for short videos, particularly popular among the lower tier cities and rural areas.
- Douyin – the short-video platform owned by ByteDance and famous outside of China as TikTok.

== Multi-channel networks in China ==
Besides the livestream platforms, the growth of the industry is fueled by multi-channel networks (MCNs), companies who incubate live streamers, or KOLs, and connect them with brands and end-users. MCN plays two critical roles. On the one hand, MCNs are training live streamers and acting as a communication bridge between merchants and live streamers. Based on the merchant's product information, the MCN selects the suitable live streamers they have trained to prepare for live streaming sales to sell their products. In addition, the MCN will negotiate details with the merchant on behalf of the live streamer, such as deposits, commissions, and products to be sold. Most MCNs have one leading KOL in the founding team or as the main source of revenue, and tend to work with one platform. Among the most famous MCNs in China are, according to TechNode:

Main MCNs in China
| MCNs | Headquarters | Key KOLs | Main platforms |
|---|---|---|---|
| Xinxuan Group | Guangzhou | Xin Youzhi (Xinba), top KOL, Founder and CEO | Kuaishou |
| Rhunn | Hangzhou | Eve Zhang (Zhang Dayi), top KOL, Co-Founder and Marketing Chief | Douyin, Taobao Live |
| MeiONE | Shanghai | Austin Li (Li Jiaqi), top KOL | Taobao Live |
| Qianxun Group | Hangzhou | Viya (Huang Wei), top KOL | Taobao Live |

== Regulatory interventions ==
In March 2021, the State Administration for Market Regulation introduced new rules targeting the development of the livestreaming e-commerce sector, giving platforms and merchants more responsibilities and addressing concerns linked to user data privacy and forced exclusivity.

In April 2021, six Chinese government agencies including the Cyberspace Administration of China rolled out additional rules requiring providers to set up a system to maintain the safety of content, verify the identity of livestream hosts and to secure users' personal information.

When these regulations were passed, platforms were required to establish content-safety systems and had to verify the real identities of hosts and operators to protect users' personal information. The measures were made effective on May 25, 2021, and also created blacklists for goods that are prohibited and real-time monitoring to prevent false advertising and counterfeit sales. Alibaba, which was at the time operating Taobao Live and Tmall Live, was among some of the platforms that were required to comply. In its 2026 SEC filing, Alibaba disclosed that in April 2021 measures were imposed to make livestreaming platforms obliged to follow the guidelines.

In August 2021, China’s Ministry of Commerce introduced new industry standards for livestream commerce, detailing how hosts should dress or speak during the live broadcasts, as well as setting guidelines for hosts and products reviews.
