= List of content platforms by monthly active users =

This is a list of the top 100 content platform services by monthly active users (MAU), not ranked in any specific order:

| Name | Type | MAU | Year | Ref |
|---|---|---|---|---|
| YouTube | video/streaming | 2,680,000,000 | 2023 | |
| Tencent Video | video | 597,000,000 | 2023 | |
| TikTok | video | 1,060,000,000 | 2023 | |
| Tencent Music | music | 592,000,000 | 2023 | |
| iQIYI | video | 500,000,000 | | |
| Youku | video | 500,000,000 | | |
| Kuaishou | video | 400,000,000 | 2019 | |
| Hotstar | video | 300,000,000 | 2020 | |
| Dailymotion | video | 300,000,000 | 2017 | |
| MX Player | video | 290,000,000 | 2021 | |
| iHeartRadio | music | 275,000,000 | | |
| Spotify | music/podcasts | 271,000,000 | 2020 | |
| JioCinema | video | 212,000,000 | 2023 | |
| Vine | video | 200,000,000 | 2015 | |
| Dailyhunt | news | 190,000,000 | | |
| Netflix | video | 182,000,000 | | |
| SoundCloud | music | 175,000,000 | 2019 | |
| Vimeo | video | 170,000,000 | | |
| DouYu | video | 163,000,00 | 2019 | |
| Gaana | music | 150,000,000 | 2020 | |
| Toutiao | news | 120,000,000 | 2017 | |
| JioSaavn | music | 190,000,000 | 2019 | |
| Rumble | video | 78,000,000 | 2022 | |
| Apple Music | music | 78,000,000 | 2021 | |
| Amazon Prime Video | video | 75,000,000 | 2019 | |
| Pandora Radio | music | 55,000,000 | 2021 | |
| Disney+ | video | 50,000,000 | | |
| Amazon Music | music | 50,000,000 | | |
| Twitch | streaming | 43,000,000 | 2013 | |
| Hulu | video | 30,000,000 | | |
| Anghami | music | 21,000,000 | 2019 | |
| Xbox Game Pass | video games | 18,000,000 | 2021 | |
| Deezer | music | 14,000,000 | | |
| Crunchyroll | video/anime | 10,000,000 | 2021 | |

== See also ==
- List of most popular social platforms
