= Qianxun Group =

Chinese multi-channel influencer network

- Native name: 谦寻
- Industry: livestreaming e-commerce
- Founded: 2017
- Headquarters: Hangzhou, China
- Key people: Viya (Huang Wei)), top KOL; Alves Huang, CEO; Dong Haifeng, Chairman
- Website: http://en.qxwhmcn.com/

Qianxun Group (Chinese: 谦寻; pinyin: Qiānxún) is a content livestream agency. It attained media attention for representing Viya (Chinese: 黃薇; pinyin: Huáng Wēi), one of China's most popular influencers, noted for having sold a rocket for RMB 40 million during a live session in April 2020.

Backed by Legend Holdings and Yunfeng Capital, Qianxun is considered one of the main multi-channel networks (MCNs) in China.

== History ==
Qianxun was founded as a company in February 2017 in Hangzhou, Zhejiang province, by Viya and her husband Huang Haifeng. Since then, the company was transformed into a group of companies, the Qianxun Group. According to the information from Tianyan, there are 36 member companies under Qianxun Group, and the core company is Qianxun (Hangzhou) Holding Co., Ltd. Among these 36 companies, only 8 were established before 2020.

Qianxun has received a number of awards from Taobao, including the top Taobao Livestreaming Agency in 2018, and 14 additional awards in 2020.

In November 2019, Qianxun's top livestreamer Viya partnered with American influencer Kim Kardashian to host a joint live session focused on perfumes sales, which attracted more than 13 million viewers in China.

In June 2021, unknown sources revealed that Qianxun was planning an overseas IPO, among fierce competition in China's livestreaming e-commerce market. However, the company denied the rumors.

At the pre-sales of the last Singles’ Day Shopping Festival on 20 October 2021 Viya achieved total sales of RMB 8.5 billion.

On December 20, 2021, Viya was fined RMB 1.43 billion by the Hangzhou tax bureau, who found her guilty of having evaded more than RMB 700 million in taxes from 2019 to 2020.

== Statistics ==
The companies in the Qianxun Group have specialized focuses such as video content production (Qianyu Entertainment Co), IP licensing (Qianxi Culture), advertising (Hangzhou Qianhe Advertising Co., Ltd) and KOL (Key Opinion Leader) training. Qianxun has a livestreaming site in Beijing and two supply chain bases in Hangzhou and Guangzhou. Qianxun was reported to employ a total of 500 people, as of June 2020.

According to the official company website, Qianxun has today over 50 anchors covering all categories of products. As of August 2021, leading influencer Viya accumulated over 83 million fans on Alibaba's Taobao.

As of July 2021, Qianxun closed partnerships with over 5,000 brands, bringing them a total GMV of RMB 10 billion.
