= Zilzar =

Malaysian marketing platform

Zilzar Tech Sdn Bhd
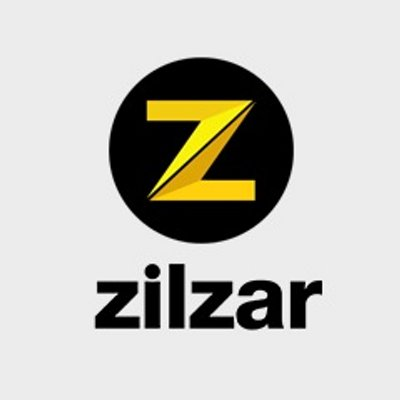
- One Community, One Platform
- Company type: Business to Business (B2B)
- Industry: Muslim Marketplace
- Founded: 2014
- Headquarters: Kuala Lumpur, Malaysia
- Area served: Worldwide
- Key people: Dato Vaseehar (Chairman)
- Website: www.zilzar.com

Zilzar (Arabic: زلزار) is a privately held, online marketing platform headquartered in Malaysia, specifically catering to Muslim consumers seeking halal products and services. The company positions itself as a global Muslim lifestyle marketplace where consumers can access information, content, community and trade. This e-commerce platform was launched in 2014 by Malaysian Prime Minister, Dato Sri Muhamad Najib Tun Razak in the 10th World Islamic Economic Forum in Dubai. The site was described as a way of empowering the consumer and creating employment for Muslims in emerging markets by the country's prime minister. The business describes its aim as connecting Muslim consumers and making it easier for halal traders around the world to conduct business online. The platform handles content regarding Islamic societies and products that deals with the compliance of the Islamic Sharia law.

== History ==
Zilzar was founded by Islamic businessman Rushdi Siddiqui, former Global Head of Islamic Finance & OIC Countries for Thomson Reuters. Rushdi also served as a Global Director for the Dow Jones Islamic Market Indices. Siddiqui is a co-founder of Shekra, an Islamic crowd funding site, and a member of the Board of Advisors for Crescenrating, a Singapore-based, Muslim travel company. Founder Rushdi is quoted by the Wall Street Journal as saying "It is our hope and belief that Zilzar and our colleagues will do for the halal industry market what Alibaba did for China."

== Products and Services ==
The business-to-business and business-to-consumer platform offers several branches of products and services. According to an Investvine interview with Siddiqui, the core product groups are: electronics; food and beverages; health and beauty; machinery, industrial parts and tools; fashion, textiles and accessories; and gifts, sports and toys.

== Operations ==
The e-commerce platform aimed to have presence in 57 Muslim countries. Zilzar was reported as operating with over 12,000 vendors in 2015. Vendors supply to the site from numerous countries, namely: China; Malaysia; Indonesia; Singapore; Thailand; the US; India; South Africa; the UK; and the Philippines. The company partners with MasterCard as a payment gateway partner on payment services. Other business partners include Hong Leong Islamic Bank Berhad (HLIB), International Centre for Education in Islamic Finance (INCEIF), Halal Development Corporation (HDC), and Crescentrating.

=== Halal Certification ===
See also: Halal

Rushdi Siddiqui, is reported as commenting on the lack of a global halal standard, calling it "a patchwork of regulations." As no single organization oversees global halal standards, interpretation of halal terms may differ between certifying organizations. This lack of consensus creates challenges for a company in the halal e-commerce marketplace. Zilzar's approach is described as being one of vetting and monitoring, where the supplier must provide the product certification to the marketplace, and the consumer may request the certification when viewing the product.

== See also ==
- B2B e-commerce
- Business-to-business
- E-commerce
- E-commerce in Southeast Asia
- Halal tourism
- Islamic dietary laws
- Islamic economics
- Online marketplace
