= Kaymu Pakistan =

Former Pakistani e-commerce portal

Kaymu.pk

- The homepage of Kaymu
- Website type: Private
- Available in: English
- Founded: 2013
- Area served: Pakistan
- Industry: Retail, Ecommerce, Online Marketplace
- Services: Online shopping
- Employees: 300
- Website: kaymu.pk (inactive)
- Current status: Defunct, merged into Daraz

Kaymu Pakistan was an e-commerce portal based in Pakistan. In July 2016 Rocket Internet merged ecommerce site Kaymu into Daraz. Kaymu stopped its operations officially in Pakistan on 5 July 2017.

== History ==
Initially launched as Azmalo.pk in January 2013, Rocket Internet rebranded the company as Kaymu.pk in September 2013, aligning the venture with the global company brand that currently spans 3 continents, Asia, Africa and Europe. Kaymu Pakistan was initially managed by Managing Director Asia Region Ahmed H. Khan followed by co-founders and Managing Directors Kaymu Asia - Christian Schröder and Niroshan Balasubramaniam respectively. Kaymu's online shopping operations in Pakistan were led by Adam Dawood as country manager from August 2014 to January 2016 followed by Ali Zain Sheikh till March 2017.

The idea behind the founding of Kaymu in Pakistan was to facilitate online buying and selling through a single platform. At the time of Kaymu's launch in Pakistan, OLX was already operating in the country as an online classifieds website. The idea of a managed online marketplace that would be providing seller rating and facilitating buyers via cash on delivery received good response from the local community. Kaymu Pakistan now serves as a platform that offers consumer to consumer (C2C) as well as business to consumer (B2C) services across the country.

Kaymu launched smartphone apps for Android, iOS and Blackberry devices in 2014 and 2015, respectively.

== Funding ==
In April 2014, Ooredoo, a Qatar-based Telecommunications Company (formerly known as QTel) joined hands with Rocket Internet. The founding of APACIG resulted in additional funding from Ooredoo.

== Rocket Internet in Pakistan ==
The German internet company Rocket Internet took an initial step into Pakistan's e-commerce sector with the establishment of Daraz.pk in July 2012. Following a positive reception in Pakistan with its first e-commerce venture, Rocket Internet expanded its operations in Pakistan to over 30 active websites in 2015, the widest known being Kaymu.pk, Foodpanda.pk and Daraz.pk. In a recent development, one of the ventures of Rocket internet in Pakistan has been acquired by Alibaba.

== Marketplace model ==
An apparent drawback Kaymu faces is the inability to gauge the quality of products listed by the sellers. Some of these products are illegally copied games and programs being listed as genuine copies.

== See also ==
- E-trading in Pakistan
