= Yang Qingning =

- Yang Yan
- Born: November 5, 1998 (age 27); Hangzhou, Zhejiang, China
- Other names: Devbor
- Education: Junior high school
- Occupations: Camgirl, singer, businesswoman
- Years active: 2014－present
- Notable work: We, Four and a half years
- Children: Xiao Nezha; June 26, 2017 (age 8)

Chinese name
- Traditional Chinese: 楊清檸
- Simplified Chinese: 杨清柠
Transcriptions
Standard Mandarin
- Hanyu Pinyin: Yáng Qīngníng
- Musical career
- Genres: Pop

Yang Qingning (simplified Chinese: 杨清柠; traditional Chinese: 楊清檸; pinyin: Yáng Qīngníng, b. 5 November 1998), native name: Yang Yan, English name: Devbor, is a Chinese Internet celebrity, Kuaishou and former camgirl. She once had many fans in Kuaishou, but was later banned after she was criticized by China Central Television for having a child out of wedlock and using a live broadcast platform for speculation. She is mainly active in Sina Weibo and shows her own photos.

== Career ==
In 2014, Yang Qingning, at age 16, joined the network broadcast platform and opened Sina Weibo. She gradually became known to the public by launching online live broadcasts in Kuaishou and sharing her photos on Weibo.

In 2017, Yang Qingning began her singing career. On June 14, her first song "We" was released online. Yang and her then-boyfriend Wang Lele provided the vocals. On September 30, she issued her first solo single "Four and a half years". From October to December, she released more songs, such as "Little Sun, If There is No If, A Little Princess".

In March 2018, she issued her second solo single, "Loving Your Smile".

In early 2018, Yang Qingning invested in ifashion, a brand owned by Taobao, and set up an online store on Taobao mall, mainly selling women's fashion.

== Personal life ==
On June 26, 2017, she gave birth to a son named Xiao Nezha with her then-unmarried boyfriend Wang Lele.

== Controversy ==
At the end of March 2018, Yang Qingning and her boyfriend, Wang Lele, were criticized by CCTV for showing their children on the Kuaishou live broadcast. Shortly after the broadcast, the accounts of Yang Qingning and Wang Lele were banned by the official of Kuaishou.

== Discography ==
Date	Title	Record company	Language
14 June 2017	We (& Wang Lele)	Longtianteng Culture	Chinese
18 August 2017	We (& Ren Jinyong)	—N/a	Chinese
30 September 2017	Four And A Half Years	Qianheshiji	Chinese
12 October 2017	Little Sun (& Xiao Jian)	Longtianteng Culture	Chinese
23 November 2017	If There is No If (& Zeng Yican)	Qianheshiji	Chinese
14 December 2017	A Little Princess (& Jiang Jiang)	Longtianteng Culture	Chinese
15 March 2017	Loving Your Smile	Qianheshiji	Chinese
