= Internet Plus =

Chinese strategy to incorporate internet in traditional industry

Internet Plus (Chinese: 互联网+), similar to Information Superhighway and Industry 4.0, is a concept and strategy proposed by China's premier Li Keqiang in his Government Work Report on March 5, 2015 so as to keep pace with the information trend. According to China's official website, "Internet plus" was on the list of significant economic keywords in 2015 and was one of the newest expressions of the two sessions (National People's Congress of the People's Republic of China and Chinese People's Political Consultative Conference, Chinese: 两会) of the year.

== Definition ==
"Internet Plus" refers to the application of the internet and other information technology in conventional industries. It is an incomplete equation where various internets (mobile Internet, cloud networking, big data or Internet of Things) can be added to other fields, fostering new industries and business development in China. It was a five-year plan to integrate traditional manufacturing and service industries with big data, cloud computing, and Internet of things technology.

== Background ==
=== Domestic challenges ===
China's economy's growing speed is declining due to the growing debt, declining factory activity and foreign exchange reserves devaluation, which has led the government to figure out a plan to create a new driver to stimulate its development.

=== International environment ===
In the field of industrial development, the U.S. government has put forward the term "Industrial Internet", while Germany has proposed the idea of Industry 4.0. The emerging new industrial revolution and ecological revolution as well as the rising of business startups indicate that the internet is not only a tool but a platform that can be combined with traditional industries.

=== Development ===
In the 2011 Two Sessions Work Report, Premier Wen Jiabao announced support for e-commerce in China, describing it as a mechanism to expand domestic consumption. Emphasis on e-commerce was later incorporated into Internet Plus.

Chinese entrepreneurs in the IT industry such as Ma Huateng, the founder of Tencent and Yu Yang, CEO of Analysys International, first put forward the idea in 2013 in a bid to extend their businesses into some service sectors. China's Premier Li Keqiang brought up the concept of Internet Plus and made it the national strategy in his Government Work Report presented to the National People's Congress. Internet Plus aims to use the internet to upgrade China's economy.

== Practical application ==
The State Council provided support for Internet Plus through policy support in area including cross-border e-commerce and rural e-commerce. Various regulatory bodies promoted Internet Plus within their sectors.

=== Internet+Manufacturing Industry ===
"Internet + Manufacturing industry" means that the traditional manufacturing enterprises can adopt information and communication technologies to reform the existing mode of production. With the help of mobile Internet technology, traditional manufacturers can install hardware and software on cars, household appliances, accessories, and other industrial products to achieve functions of remote control, automatic data acquisition and analysis, etc.

=== Internet+Finance ===
"Internet + Finance" means that financial industries can apply internet technology to their service provision and product sale. For instance, clients can pay bills or transfer money from one account to another through internet. The number of Internet users has reached about 649 million in China, while the amount of e-commerce has been more than 13 trillion yuan (Chinese monetary unit). China's import and export transactions of cross-border e-commerce has exceeded 3 billion yuan. The potential risks of this new technology in a financial industry also exists in terms of personal information security since the related information could be under higher exposure than before.

=== Internet+Medical System ===
Internet plus is expected to ease the medical current problems of the general public in China. Specifically, Internet plus will optimize the traditional mode of treatment for patients with one-stop health management services. Through the Internet, the patient's medical data can be obtained from the mobile terminal to monitor their own health data.

=== Internet+Government ===
"Internet + Government" (also known as Internet government, digital government, online government and connected government) consists of the digital interactions between the government and citizens, government and government agencies, government and employees, and government and the commerce.(Jeong, 2007)

With the help of this new strategy, governments can enable anyone visiting a city website to communicate and interact with city employees via the Internet. As for ordinary people, they can access to government affairs, learn about concerned information and express their attitudes toward government. Moreover, government work such as permanent residence registration, careers guidance can be done via the internet.

=== Internet+Agriculture ===
"Internet + Agriculture" makes it possible to precisely know the climate, the land and all the other large data analysis for agricultural purposes. In addition, the farmers can use the Internet to acquire updated information about the price and the demand for their production.

== Influences and outlook ==
Apart from Chinese government's goal of upgrading China into a "powerful industrial country", the "Internet Plus" strategy will, most importantly, produce new economic forms and create suitable environment for the general public to make innovations or start their own business. Moreover, according to the official statement, the plan exerts a profound influence on adapting to information economy, rebuilding innovation system, intriguing creativity, cultivating emerging industry and public service pattern.

== Limitations and challenges ==
A first challenge to the Internet Plus plan is that, precisely, if it's government-powered in China, it means going through all the ladder of central, provincial and local barons. Another argument from the South China Morning Post edited in Hong Kong writes that "Beijing needs to address censorship before any new strategy can be expected to have an impact", adding that "we all know the key thing about the internet is freedom. If Beijing misses the point and continues to censor access to information, Premier Li's new Internet Plus strategy will probably just get more Chinese to shop online rather than have any significant and long-term impact on the country's long-awaited economic transformation." On top of that, while Chinese government filter a lot of access to information, the relationship between Internet Plus and freedom of speech online is doubted by some people.

== See also ==
- E-commerce
- Big data
- Industry 4.0
- WeChat
- VPN
