= List of Kuaishou original programming =

Kuaishou is a Chinese short video sharing platform.

== Variety/live streaming ==
Title	Genre	Premiere	Season	Length	Status
Roast Nice (Chinese: 超Nice大会）	Standup	November 21, 2021	4 episodes update	1 hour 30 min.	Ended
Olympics First Grade (Chinese: 奥运一年级)	Reality	July 23, 2021	-	Live stream	Ended
Yuè nǔlì yuè xìngyùn (Chinese: 岳努力越幸运)	Food	September 23, 2021	Updating	45 min.	Ongoing
Kuaishou Super Livestreaming (Chinese: 快手超级播)	Live stream/variety/special	February 1, 2021	26 episodes	live stream (during 2021 Spring festival)	Ended
Guòzhāo niúrén zhī yè（Chinese: 过招牛人之夜）	Festival/special	February 4, 2020	1 episode	Live stream	Ended
Dàn yuàn rén chángjiǔ (Chinese: 诞愿人长久)	Standup	February 22, 2020	-	Live stream (during China national COVID-19 lockdown)	Ended
Natural Born Dancer (Chinese: 天生就是舞者)	Dance competition/live stream	-	-	Live stream	Ended

== Short drama ==
=== Vertical ===
Title	Genre	Premiere	Season	Length	Status
Love Start from Misunderstood (Chinese: 全世界都误会我们在恋爱)	Romance	October 23, 2021	20 episodes update	2 min.	Ended
Your Eyes, My World（Chinese: 你的眼睛，我的世界）	Romance	October 4, 2021	24 episodes	2 min.	Ended
The Legend of Qing Yan (Chinese: 青颜传)	Chinese costume/romance	October 5, 2021	19 episodes update	2 min.	Ended
This male protagonist is a bit cold (Chinese: 这个男主有点冷)	Drama	February 7, 2021	32 episodes	2 min.	Ended

== Movie ==
Title	Genre	Premiere	Length
The Empty Nest	Drama	May 10, 2020	84 min.
