= Su Hua =

Chinese entrepreneur

- 宿华
- Born: 1982 (age 43–44); Hunan, China
- Education: Tsinghua University
- Occupation: Businessman
- Known for: Chairman of the board of Kuaishou

Chinese name
- Simplified Chinese: 宿华
Transcriptions
Standard Mandarin
- Hanyu Pinyin: Sù Huá

Su Hua (Chinese: 宿华, born 1982 in Hunan Province) is a Chinese billionaire internet entrepreneur. He is the co-founder and CEO of the video platform Kuaishou, which is known outside of China under the name Kwai. In April 2021, Forbes estimated his personal wealth at $17 billion.

== Early life ==
Su comes from a simple family from a village in the west of Hunan Province, which only received electricity in 1998. He learned to code on a children's learning program age 12. He is a graduate of Tsinghua University.

== Career ==
He worked as a software developer first for Google in the United States and later for Baidu. In 2011, together with Cheng Yixiao, he founded the mobile app Kuaishou, which was initially intended for sharing GIF images. Kuaishou later became an app for short videos and live streaming. Tencent was one of the early investors. In October 2021, Su step down as CEO of Kuaishou.
