= Paysbuy =

- Type: Private
- Industry: Electronic payment processing
- Founded: 2004
- Headquarters: Bangkok, Thailand
- Key people: Aung Kyaw Moe, Suchote Cheewakoseth
- Revenue: 2 billion Thai Baht (2013)
- Owner: Bank of Thailand; DTAC
- Number of employees: 11-50
- Website: paysbuy.com

Paysbuy is a payment processor and one of Thailand's three major payment service providers. It is a subsidiary of DTAC.

Paysbuy is licensed by the Bank of Thailand to operate an e-money business and is accredited with Trustmark (DBD Verified) by the Department of Business Development, Ministry of Commerce.

== History ==
Paysbuy was founded in 2004 by Aung Kyaw Moe and Suchote Cheewakoseth.

In 2008, DTAC acquired the majority stake in the company. Paysbuy was the first e-wallet service in Thailand and was acquired by Omise in 2017.

== See also ==
- PayPal
- DTAC
- True Money
