= SoundCloud =

German audio streaming service

- Screenshot Screenshot of the desktop version of SoundCloud
- Company type: Private
- Website type: Music streaming; Internet community (Social community)
- Available in: English
- Founded: 27 August 2007; 19 years ago
- Headquarters: Berlin, Germany
- Country of origin: Sweden
- Area served: Worldwide
- Owners: SoundCloud Global Limited & Co. KG
- Founders: Alexander Ljung; Eric Wahlforss
- Key people: Eliah Seton (CEO); Drew Wilson (COO, CFO); Lauren Wirtzer-Seawood (CCO, CMO); Antonious Porch (CDO); Alexander Ljung (Chairman and Co-Founder)
- Industry: Music; Social media
- Services: Audio; Internet forum
- Employees: ≈425 (2021)
- Website: soundcloud.com
- Registration: Optional but required for certain tasks, such as post and upload content, save playlists, and follow artists
- Users: ▲140 million users monthly (2023)
- Launched: 17 October 2008; 18 years ago
- Current status: Active
- Written in: Ruby; Scala; Clojure

SoundCloud is a German multinational company and streaming service founded in Stockholm and headquartered in Berlin. It is owned and operated by SoundCloud Global Limited & Co. KG. The service allows its users to upload, promote, and share audio. Founded in 2007 by Alexander Ljung and Eric Wahlforss, SoundCloud is one of the largest music streaming services in the world and is available in 190 countries and territories. The service has upwards of 76 million active monthly users and over 200 million audio tracks as of November 2021.

== History ==
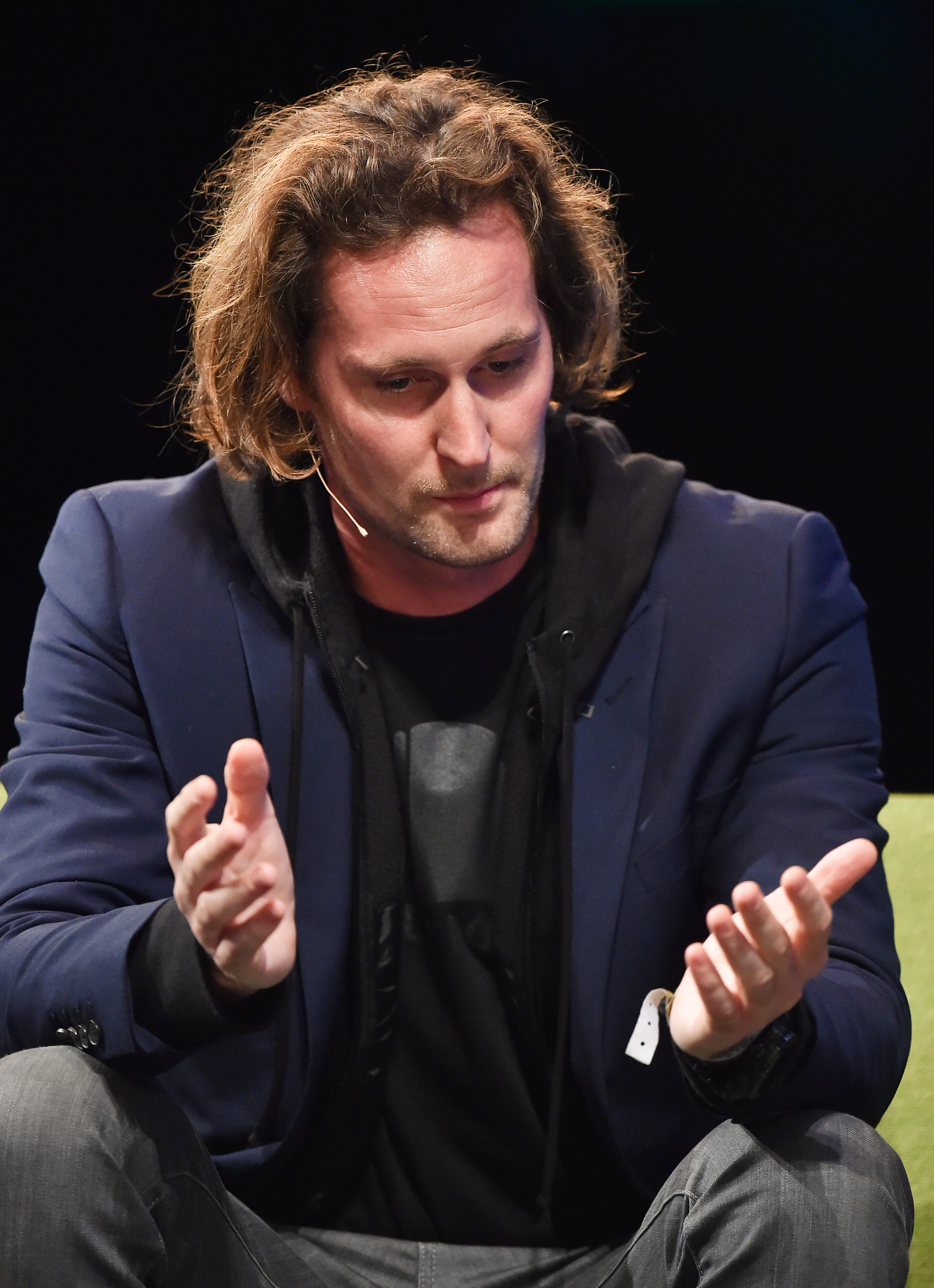
Eric Wahlforss in 2014

SoundCloud was established in Stockholm on 27 August 2007, by Swedish sound designer Alexander Ljung and Swedish electronic musician Eric Wahlforss; SoundCloud's website was launched on 17 October 2008. It was originally intended to allow musicians to collaborate by facilitating the sharing and discussion of recordings, but later transformed into a publishing tool for music distribution. According to Wired magazine, soon after its inception, SoundCloud began to challenge the dominance of Myspace as a platform for musicians to distribute their music.

In April 2009, SoundCloud received €2.5 million Series A funding from Doughty Hanson Technology Ventures. In May 2010, SoundCloud announced it had one million users. In January 2011, it was reported that SoundCloud had raised US$10 million Series B funding from Union Square Ventures and Index Ventures. On 15 June 2011, SoundCloud reported five million registered users and investments from Ashton Kutcher and Guy Oseary's A-Grade Fund, and on 23 January 2012, it reported 10 million registered users. In May 2012, it was announced that SoundCloud had 15 million users, and site usage was increasing by 1.5 million monthly users.

In March 2014, Twitter announced it would partner with SoundCloud in developing its first integrated music app. However, the project never moved forward because SoundCloud could not accommodate licensed music due to a lack of necessary arrangements with music labels. In July 2013, SoundCloud had 40 million registered users and new users were joining at 20 million per month.

SoundCloud announced in January 2014 that it had commenced licensing negotiations with major music companies to address unauthorized, copyrighted material regularly appearing on the platform. The announcement followed a round of funding in which US$60 million was raised, resulting in a $700 million valuation. According to media sources, the negotiations were initiated in an attempt to avoid similar problems faced by Google, which had been forced to handle a large number of take down notices on its YouTube video-sharing platform.

In May 2015, it was reported that Twitter was considering the acquisition of SoundCloud for approximately US$2 billion. However, the prospect of acquisition was discounted by the media, with one report stating that "the numbers didn't add up", and Bobby Owsinski hypothesizing on the Forbes website in July that SoundCloud's ongoing inability to secure deals with the major music labels was the foremost culprit.

On 28 September 2016, Spotify announced that it was considering to buy SoundCloud. On 8 December 2016, Spotify was reported to have abandoned its acquisition plans.

In February 2019, SoundCloud reported having surpassed 200 million sound tracks, four times as many as Myspace had.

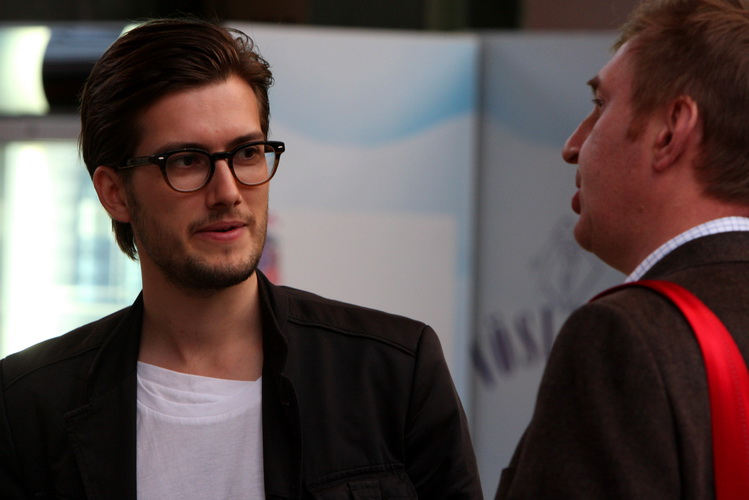
Alexander Ljung at Next10 (2010)

In May 2019, SoundCloud bought artist distribution platform Repost Network.

In January 2020, a US$75 million investment by SiriusXM was announced.

On 2 March 2021, SoundCloud announced a new pay model for artists, entitled "fan-powered royalties", which went into effect on 1 April 2021.

In December 2021, SoundCloud Chief Financial Officer, Drew Wilson, said the company is "at the doorsteps of break-even" and said the company expects to generate a net profit by 2023. The rise in popularity of SoundCloud Rap (a.k.a. "mumble rap") and ability for new artists to gain popularity helped SoundCloud gain enough users to continue business. Compared to other streaming services, SoundCloud is an interactive platform, which contributes to the artist being able to gain popularity.

In January 2024, SoundCloud moved its New York City headquarters from 71 Fifth Avenue to 2 Gansevoort. This 23,000 square foot space was the former home of Kobalt Music Group.

=== Monetization, subscription services ===
In August 2014, SoundCloud announced a new program known as On SoundCloud, which would allow "premier" partners to monetize their content through pre-roll audio ads, channel sponsorships, mobile display ads, and native content. The company announced deals with a number of content partners (including Comedy Central and Funny or Die), independent labels, and YouTube multi-channel networks, and that it was in "active and ongoing, advanced discussions" with major record labels.

In December 2014, it was reported that SoundCloud could potentially raise approximately US$150 million in new financing, resulting in a valuation surpassing one billion dollars. The major label issue became prominent again when the new financing information was released, as the lack of monetization was presented as an issue—SoundCloud signed an agreement with Warner Music Group as part of the new Premier program that allows both Warner Music, which also has a minor stake in the company, and its publishing division to collect royalties for songs they have chosen to monetize on the site; meanwhile, the other labels remained skeptical of the company's business model. By December 2014, SoundCloud had shared ad revenue with about 60 other Premier Partners. Concerns over the amount of revenue from the program led Sony Music Entertainment to pull its content from the service entirely in May 2015. In June 2015, SoundCloud announced that it had reached a deal with the Merlin Network, a group representing 20,000 independent record labels, to monetize their content through the Premier partner program.

In January and March 2016, SoundCloud reached respective deals with Universal Music Group and Sony Music Entertainment. A UMG spokesperson told The New York Times that the deal would give the company an option to require certain content to be restricted to paid subscribers, a statement suggesting that SoundCloud was preparing to launch its own subscription streaming service.

In February 2017, SoundCloud launched a mid-range subscription tier named SoundCloud Go, that allows users to remove ads and listen offline for $US5 per month through the site. The original version, which was renamed to SoundCloud Go+, allows access to (at the time) over 150 million songs, offline playback, no ads, no previews, and premium music tracks for $US10 per month through the site. Both subscriptions were categorized for listeners, with separate subscription services provided specifically for creators.

In Spring 2017, SoundCloud initially faced being sold after not raising the $100 million needed to support the platform. The initial evaluation of SoundCloud at $700 million did not hold as strong to investors after their financial shortages.

In July 2017, SoundCloud announced layoffs and the closure of two of its five offices in San Francisco and London in an effort to manage costs. In August 2017, SoundCloud announced it reached an agreement on a $169.5 million investment from The Raine Group and Temasek. In connection with the investment, veteran digital media operators Kerry Trainor and Michael Weissman joined the SoundCloud team respectively as chief executive officer and Chief Operating Officer. Alexander Ljung and Eric Wahlforss remained with the company—Ljung as chairman of the board, and Wahlforss as Chief Product Officer until 2019, when Wahlforss transitioned into an advisory role.

In May 2022, SoundCloud announced the company had acquired the Singapore based music AI company Musiio, with the aims of increasing features on the site such as discovery features. SoundCloud acquired Nina Protocol in July 2026.

== Performance Rights Organizations royalties ==
For music registered with a Performance Rights Organization (PRO) which have been uploaded to and played on SoundCloud, public performance royalties will be paid to composers, songwriters, and publishers under blanket public performance licenses maintained by SoundCloud with all of the major PROs worldwide. Under these agreements, SoundCloud reports information about tracks registered with PROs, including their corresponding ISWC numbers and the total number of times in quarter the tracks have been played. PROs use this information to match reported works with entries in their repertoire databases. For example, ASCAP and BMI use their jointly operated SongView database to identify and verify registered musical works. Unlike payments made through SoundCloud's own monetization programs, public performance royalties distributed by PROs are mandatory under the licensee's agreements with the PROs and are processed on a quarterly basis, with payments typically released 5 to 6 months after the end of the applicable quarter.

== Platforms and features ==
A new APN was released in December 2012 which improved mobile device support and added features such as concurrent listening, site navigation, and the ability to create personal collections. At this time, SoundCloud was reported to be "reaching 180 million people per month", with 10 hours of content being uploaded per minute.

SoundCloud offers two mobile apps; the main SoundCloud app is oriented towards streaming, with music discovery, playlist, and sharing features. In November 2015, its separate app known as SoundCloud Pulse was released for Android and iOS; it is primarily oriented towards content creators, allowing users to upload and manage their uploads, reply to comments, and view statistics. In July 2020, SoundCloud introduced Insights into its mobile app, discontinuing SoundCloud Pulse. Through the new Insights portal all users can see their top listener, top city, top country and top 50 tracks, while Pro Unlimited subscribers have access to their top 50 everything (listeners, cities, countries, and tracks).

In April 2017, Chromecast support was added to the main SoundCloud iOS app.

SoundCloud previously delivered audio in 128 kbit/s MP3 and 64 kbit/s Opus formats via HTTP progressive download and HLS. On 15 September 2025, it was announced that the MP3 and Opus formats would be deprecated on 15 November 2025, and replaced by 96 kbit/s / 160 kbit/s AAC via HLS, as part of efforts to provide a standardised experience across various devices and operating systems.

== Subscription services ==
=== SoundCloud Go ===
On 29 March 2016, SoundCloud unveiled SoundCloud Go, a subscription-based music streaming service; the service provides an ad-free experience, offline playback, and integrates licensed music from major labels into the existing, user-uploaded content of the service. Co-founder Eric Wahlforss stated that this aspect would help to differentiate SoundCloud Go from other music streaming services such as Spotify and Apple Music, as it technically provides a larger total library of songs than competing services, with a higher degree of diversity in its content. The Verge found that, excluding existing content uploaded by users, the service's initial library of songs is smaller than those of its closest competitors.

The service was initially priced at US$10 per month. On 28 February 2017, SoundCloud renamed its main Go plan SoundCloud Go+, adding a secondary tier titled SoundCloud Go at a US$5 price point, which does not include the licensed music library but still offers ad-free and offline playback. SoundCloud Go+ offers mix tracks for certain DJ apps, has a complete catalogue, and has 256 kbit/s streaming.

=== Artist Pro ===
SoundCloud offers premium services for musicians with their Artist Pro (Formerly Next Pro) service. With Artist Pro, subscribers can upload unlimited audio files, access enhanced analytics, distribute their music to other streaming platforms, and access tools to reach larger audiences. This service is available for US$99 per year, and is available globally.

== Label services ==
=== SoundCloud For Artists ===
In October 2022, SoundCloud announced its music distribution service SoundCloud For Artists, a successor to Jeff Ponchick's Repost Network which SoundCloud acquired in 2019. Repost Network formerly had two divisions, Repost and Repost Select. Repost was a paid distribution platform available to the public whereas Repost Select was the dedicated label services department that provided label services such as marketing, funding and music distribution for artists that signed with SoundCloud directly/independent labels that have partnerships with SoundCloud.

In July 2022, SoundCloud A&R Cameron Cox carried out a distribution deal with Sohaib Ali and Alontae Lloyd's BlondeWorld Label which is the first independent label to enter into a partnership venture with the company prior to the rebranding.

== Criticism ==
As SoundCloud evolved and expanded beyond its initial user base, consisting primarily of grassroots musicians, many users complained that it had sacrificed its usefulness to independent artists in an attempt to appeal to the masses, perhaps in preparation for public sale. Such criticism particularly followed the launching of a revamped website in 2013 which, according to former CEO Alexander Ljung, was implemented for the purpose of increasing SoundCloud usage.

On 3 July 2014, TorrentFreak reported that SoundCloud offered unlimited removal powers to certain copyright holders, allowing those copyright holders to unilaterally remove paid subscribers' content without recourse.

In April 2015, SoundCloud announced a new partnership with Zefr, a content tracking company that works with YouTube to help identify songs on the platform and facilitate either takedowns or ads being run against it.

In July 2016, SoundCloud notified registered users via email that it would be "phasing out" groups because they "were not a strong driver to help users share their new tracks to the most users effectively". This announcement was met with alarm and concerned responses from numerous artists because it would eliminate their only effective means of sharing music on SoundCloud.

In January 2023, Taiwan was changed from a country to a "Province of China" on SoundCloud's website.

SoundCloud has also been criticized for changes in service. The anti-piracy algorithm—which was put into place to combat the number of illegal music downloads—has often been criticized for taking down music that was not illegally submitted or downloaded. Also, Universal Music Group has the right to take down any files on SoundCloud. Uploads can be taken down directly by Universal Music Group outside of SoundCloud's anti-piracy policy. Other than uploads, Universal Music Group has the ability to take down accounts, both premium and free. Customers of the company have claimed this to be "bogus", arguing that the right to manage and delete accounts should be reserved to SoundCloud itself, not to an outside company.

== Cultural impact ==
=== Music industry ===
SoundCloud first entered the music streaming industry as a new way for artists to share and promote their music. As an online platform, artists can release music without a record label or distributor. SoundCloud users are both listeners and artists, using the platform together, creating a community focused space. Features that enable users to comment, like, and share songs allows the platform to operate as a social media site rather than a streaming service. In 2018, the Grammys began to recognize artists and their music on SoundCloud. The shift from The Recording Academy was thanks to the popularity of the platform and their artists. Chance the Rapper is an example of a SoundCloud artist who broke the mould of the industry; he released his debut mixtape, 10 Day, on SoundCloud. In a Vanity Fair interview Chance explained how he decided against signing to a major label and felt it was better for him to give his music "without any limit on it".

==== SoundCloud rap ====
Through SoundCloud, a sub-genre of rap was created. Artists such as SpaceGhostPurrp, Lil Pump, XXXTentacion, Juice Wrld, Lil Skies, Nav, Lil Uzi Vert, Playboi Carti, Trippie Redd, Tay-K, Pop Smoke, 6ix9ine, Lil Xan, Lil Yachty, Ski Mask the Slump God, Lil Tjay, Smokepurpp, Suicideboys, Lil Peep, PlayThatBoiZay, Famous Dex, and Denzel Curry originated from SoundCloud and have since risen to the Billboard top charts. The sound created was different from the mainstream, featuring a grittier and darker sound that results from a lack of production. SoundCloud rap is a lo-fi, melody driven, distorted sound with lyrics that usually focus on repetition and less on content. The SoundCloud artists themselves are known to have exaggerated appearances that include bright colored hair and face tattoos. Smokepurpp, a SoundCloud artist, explained in a Rolling Stone article how the first songs he created and put on the platform were recorded using a simple headphone microphone. The DIY nature of SoundCloud made it so millions of artists were able to put out their work without any studio equipment usually needed to make music. The freedom to upload on the platform allows for many SoundCloud rappers to post tracks impulsively or post many tracks at a time. For example, Lil Uzi Vert was known to upload songs to SoundCloud impulsively, usually without telling anyone except their security and close friends. The imperfect sound created by these SoundCloud rappers has contributed to their growing popularity and the creation of a rap sub-genre.

== Availability ==
At the end of November 2013, the desktop web version of SoundCloud was blocked in mainland China; on 3 March 2014, its mobile web version and mobile app were completely blocked in mainland China. The government of Turkey blocked access to the SoundCloud website in January 2014. In October 2022, Russia's Federal Service for Supervision of Communications, Information Technology and Mass Media blocked access to SoundCloud due to its refusal to remove anti-war podcasts.

== See also ==
- Weird SoundCloud
- Music websites
- Music streaming services
