= E-commerce in Southeast Asia =

E-commerce in Southeast Asia is the buying and selling of products and services over the internet in the countries of Southeast Asia. These practices reached Southeast Asia during the dot-com mania in the 1990s. After the dot-com bust, local e-companies have seen promising growth in this sector.

== History ==
=== Before the Bubble ===
The Internet and the beginning of e-commerce in the 1990's made it practical for Southeast Asian consumers to purchase items from American and European companies that would be delivered in their countries. The dot-com companies’ stock prices then skyrocketed, and native companies felt they needed to catch up to the other high selling e-commerce countries, choosing to underestimate the risks of launching many e-companies and letting the market decide which ones would succeed.

Asia had begun to receive nearly half of the total capital inflow from developing countries, attracted by the high interest rates. The economies of Malaysia, Singapore, Thailand and Indonesia saw high GDP growth rates up to 12 percent, due to the stable Asian economies, the World Bank and the IMF for the benefit of the Asian local companies.

=== After the Bubble ===
After 2000, the e-commerce market was mainly dominated by business-to-business (B2B) transactions due to consumer mistrust after going through the 1997's financial crisis in Southeast Asia and the bubble burst. The only way e-commerce companies could re-enter the business-to-consumer (B2C) market was to earn back consumer trust. Companies like Amazon.com, for example, spent almost a decade, in coordination with the Southeast Asian governments that became more “internet-friendly," to rebuild that trust.

==== Challenges ====
In addition to consumer mistrust, e-companies have to face low internet usage. According to Nielsen, the average Southeast Asian internet penetration was around 38% among the 15 and over population, with the exception of Singapore where the use of internet is widespread (~ 67%). This number is comparatively low to the rest of the world with Australia (78.9%), United States (78.1%), Germany (83%) and Japan (79.5%).

Others hurdles to overcome are cultural. For example, the number of credit card owners in Asia, and those who use payments other than cash, is small. Trust of the bank system and the electronic payments is traditionally low but government initiatives such as Thailand's PromptPay is trying to push for a "cashless society." The payments by credit or debit card are, however, on the rise, allowing the development of internet services and retail. The high rate of fraud and corruption in some countries also discourages people from paying over the internet.

While payment and credit card usage is one element, the massive differences in cultural sensitivity differ greatly between e-commerce in Singapore and those of e-commerce in Indonesia and many other predominately Islamic countries, leading to interregional advertising confusion.

Lack of information in the industry is also a major concern as reliable market data is scarce and employees lack the digital experience needed to grow quickly. Market research brands such as ecommerceIQ are trying to fix this problem by published and sharing research and insights regarding e-commerce in Southeast Asia. The market research brand launched officially in February 2016 with Google Thailand.

In response to these challenges, emerging e-commerce service providers such as WeLoveShopping, iTrueMart and aCommerce provide cash on delivery (COD) in order to penetrate second and third tier cities in Southeast Asia, as demonstrated by the 42% sales rate outside of the Thai capital, Bangkok.

When participating in mobile commerce campaigns in the region, brands also noticed an uptick in sales of luxury items. "What was most surprising to us was how well high price point items sold. We believe this is driven by the fact that customers have the option to pay via cash on delivery (COD), which reduces the perceived risk for the customer and also enables brands to target customers in regions with lower credit card penetration," said aCommerce Regional Chief Marketing Officer, Sheji Ho.

The Cambodian e-commerce market is less developed compared to the other nations in the ASEAN region. Lack of internet infrastructure outside of major towns and cities, audience insecurity about purchasing online, delivery systems and logistics within the country to credit cards usage, and taxes, as well as many other factors, have been major stumbling blocks in this development.

==== Growth of Domestic e-commerce ====
With bankruptcies of many dominant international companies at the beginning of 2000 Southeast Asian companies were able to take over the Internet: Blogs, reviewssocial networks and others started flourishing.

It was not until the end of 2011, however, that e-commerce really re-established itself in Southeast Asia. Foreign companies no longer just ship there but actually offer products and services focused on and responsive to regional needs, from local offices to warehouses.

Photobook Malaysia started in 2005 with a seed fund of RM1.4 Million, offering a service where people can print their digital photos and turn them into photo books, and later turned into a multinational company.

Rocket Internet was the first company to enter the online shopping market at a large scale in the region, through Singapore, with its fashion venture Zalora. Following that success, Rocket Internet launched Lazada Malaysia, an Amazon.com equivalent offering a range of products from electronics, recreation, home appliances, books, video games, health and beauty products, toys, baby products, and fashion items such as bags.

The draw was cutting shipping time needed for favorite foreign goods from up to a month to just a few days. They did this by offering Southeast Asians the opportunity to get the same products that they used to purchase through foreign companies along with local products from an online company just around the corner.

Zalora and Lazada Malaysia rapidly spread out to neighbor countries and are now among the top most visited and most efficient websites in Southeast Asia, leading to international investors, seeing the potential in the Southeast Asian market, investing heavily in Lazada.

In Thailand, WeLoveShopping was established in 2004 as a C2C online marketplace by Ascend Group, a spin-off of True Corporation and a subsidiary of C.P. Group. The site has recently changed its business model from earning revenue from rentals of online stores to earning commissions from transaction fees ranging from 2.9 to 13%. Payments for products will be placed in Escrow with cooperation with TrueMoney, and only when the product is delivered to the buyer satisfactorily will the seller get paid. Ascend Group also went on to set up iTrueMart in 2013 as a B2C e-commerce platform. In 2015, iTrueMart turned to Amazon Web Services (AWS) to run its e-commerce website and launched in the Philippines.

To overcome the mistrust of the consumers, e-companies adapted themselves to the market and its difficulties. In the case of Rocket Internet and aCommerce, they decided to offer the payment methods such as credit card payment and cash on delivery. Furthermore, they updated methods compared to the brick-and-mortar businesses to meet market expectations: They launched the “14 day return” policy and free and fast delivery in all countries to attract consumers back.

Soon after the appearance of Lazada and Zalora, Rakuten, Japan's largest B2B2C online retailer, also decided to reach into the same market by launching Rakuten in Malaysia. Even though they were already working with local and small e-commerce companies in a low customer catchment area, in Thailand in 2009 and Indonesia in 2011, their Malaysian venture is their biggest achievement in the region. They also had to match consumers’ expectations by offering attractive payment methods and appealing customer service.

The second largest country in Southeast Asia, the Philippines is a large and rapidly developing market for e-commerce. In 2018, there were 37.75 million eCommerce users in the Philippines, with an additional 18.02 million users expected to be shopping online by 2022. By then, these 45.77 million eCommerce users will spend an average of US$48.72 online. Total Filipino eCommerce revenue across all product categories is US$1.49 billion, and is expected to grow to US$2.62 billion by 2021. Electronics & Media is currently the leading product category in the Philippines, accounting for US$618.6 million market share, followed by Toys, Hobby & DIY, which generates US$336.5 million in sales. 47% of Filipino shoppers like to pay with cash on delivery when shopping online.

In response to the significant growth in the number of online retailers, price-comparison websites became another e-commerce business on the rise. They compile product database from online retailers, traffic users to their websites, before redirecting to the designated merchants. Examples of these websites are Priceza, iprice, PricePanda and Pricetory.

Despite the lack of trust in e-commerce and several cultural issues coming from the recent financial crisis, the market for e-businesses has been growing at a double-digit rate and seems poised to become one of the most profitable sectors.

The e-commerce sector has grown rapidly over the past few years. This is due to the fact that more businesses are using digital technology such as online shopping, social media marketing, etc. Especially during the Covid pandemic time, when e-commerce platforms grew even more. In Malaysia, the e-commerce revenue was recorded at RM279.0 billion, a jump of 17.1 per cent year-on-year in the third quarter of 2021.

=== The Biggest E-Commerce SEA Q1 2019 ===
Based on mobile app Monthly Active Users

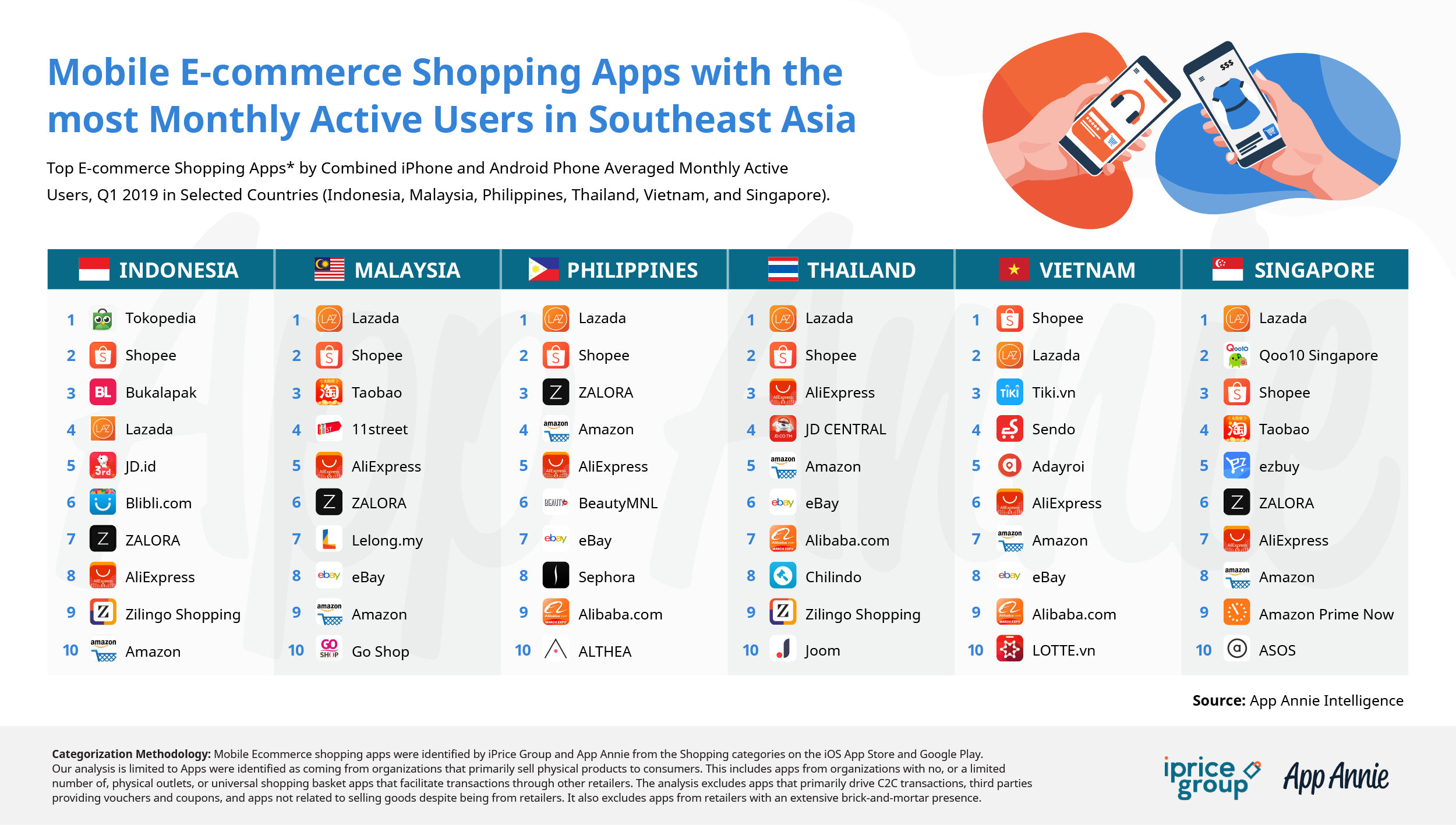

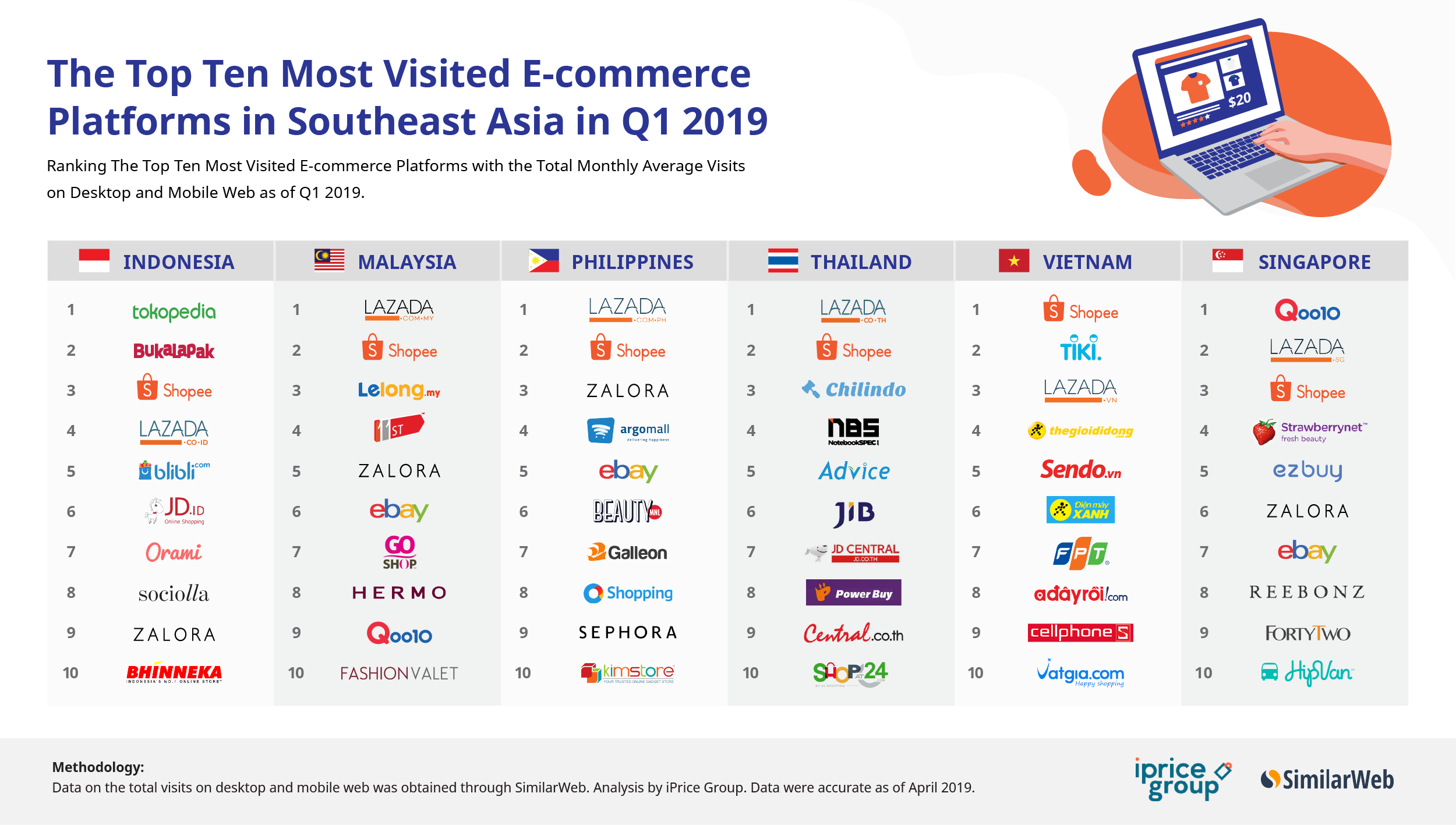

Source: iPrice
