= Brushing (e-commerce) =

Deceitful technique used in e-commerce to boost seller ratings

A suspicious seed package intercepted for analysis by the National Identification Service of the USDA's Animal and Plant Health Inspection Service (APHIS)

In e-commerce, brushing, also called review brushing, is a deceitful technique sometimes used to boost a seller's ratings by creating fake orders, which are either shipped to an accomplice or to an unsuspecting member of the public.

Most e-commerce sites rate sellers by multiple criteria and display these seller ratings to customers. Since a good rating can boost sales, these ratings are very important to sellers. The number of items shipped is usually an important factor in that rating, as is the star rating given by the person who placed the order (irrespective of who received the item, or whether the parcel that was sent to them even contained it).

== Process ==
A seller pays someone a small amount to place a fake order, or just uses another person's information to place an order themselves. Because a shipment usually has to take place for an order to be considered valid by the e-commerce site, the seller will frequently ship an empty box or some cheap item. These fake orders, if unnoticed, can boost the seller's rating, which can make it more likely that their items will appear at the top of search results on e-commerce sites. The person who placed the order may also post a positive rating or review, further artificially increasing the credibility of the item's listing.

In an effort to avoid detection, brushers may seek to imitate genuine consumer behavior, for example by browsing competitors' listings before making a purchase from the seller whose reviews they are inflating. This technique may have additional benefits to brushers on platforms like Taobao, where click-to-purchase conversions significantly influence search rankings on the platform.

Many e-commerce sites have recognized the problem and claim to actively combat brushing. One example is Alibaba, who mentioned it as a problem in the prospectus they published before their initial public offering. Brushing also inflates the numbers reported on a company's financial statements, and therefore it also attracts the scrutiny of investors and market regulators. For instance, the U.S. Securities and Exchange Commission opened a probe to investigate the validity of their data when Alibaba reported revenue of more than $14 billion on Singles' Day.

== Past incidents ==
In 2015, investigators working for the travel review platform Tripadvisor identified an Italian business, PromoSalento, which was offering to write fake reviews for hospitality businesses to help them improve their Tripadvisor profile. The man operating the business was found guilty in a "landmark ruling" in the Italian courts, jailed for 9 months and ordered to pay €8000 in costs and damages.

In July 2019, consumers were warned to be wary of unsolicited Amazon packages following reports of individuals receiving packages they never ordered as part of such brushing schemes. In Amazon's system, those making the original purchase are allowed to leave a verified review for the product, thus boosting the rating by posting a fake five-star review. The customer's address may have been previously obtained by a third-party seller, or even through a simple Internet search. While receiving such packages may not necessarily indicate any greater problem, they could in some cases be indicative of a data breach. Customers who believed they may have been the victim of brushing scams were advised to immediately notify the retailer in question, as well as change their password and possibly utilize credit-monitoring services.

The FBI has warned of a variation of brushing in which criminals mail unsolicited packages containing a QR code. The packages often carry no sender details, which encourages recipients to scan the code. Doing so can lead them to a request for personal and financial details or to the installation of malware that steals data from their phones. The FBI said this scam was less widespread than other fraud schemes.

=== 2020 Chinese seeds incident ===
Unsolicited seeds analysed by APHIS Plant Protection and Quarantine (PPQ) botanists at the National Identification Services (NIS) Lab in Beltsville, Maryland

In July 2020, thousands of packages of seeds marked with false descriptions such as earrings were received all over the world from China. Many early reports traced the story to a Facebook post by a woman in Tooele, Utah, which had drawn many of her neighbors with the same experience. The mysterious seeds caused biosecurity concerns but were thought to be another brushing scam. Authorities such as the United Kingdom's DEFRA and the USA's USDA APHIS investigated and Kentucky agriculture commissioner Ryan Quarles said: "We don't have enough information to know if this is a hoax, a prank, an internet scam or an act of agricultural bioterrorism". China Post said that the mailing labels had been forged while Taiwan intended to fine a Chinese logistics company for transshipping contraband.

In September 2020, an article by Motherboard which summarized the result of Freedom of Information Act requests relayed that a Utah lab reported, "Our seed lab has identified the following: rose, amaranth (not Palmer), 2 mints, False Horse Balm, Self Heal, Lespedeza and Sweet Potato."

In late September 2020 the Utah Department of Agriculture and Food announced that Amazon had agreed to a voluntary US inbound seed quarantine, wherein they would delist seeds from outside the US that any seller attempted to sell into the US. The American Seed Trade Association gave a statement saying that this was their understanding also.

On September 29, 2020, the Brazilian Ministry of Agriculture said it had so far received 36 complaints about unsolicited seeds. These reports came in across eight states.

Alibaba and eBay's plant security practices were investigated by James Comer, Ranking Member of the House Oversight and Reform Committee, at the start of October 2020.

Seed mailings occurred again, following a hiatus, in October 2020 in Marion County, Alabama.

In November 2020, the Arizona Department of Agriculture said that seed mailings had slowed but not stopped. Most reports were from the Phoenix and Tucson areas, although the entire state had reports. The seeds were ornamentals, fruits, vegetables, herbs, and wheat. The seeds were noted for their potential to spread viruses and other diseases.

In November 2020, the Australian Department of Agriculture said that they had received 228 reports and had decided to start using a new x-ray system. Unlike the existing x-ray scanners used at borders, these would use automated processing of the x-ray images themselves, which the DoA expected to yield more thorough results. For seeds that were not caught by the scanners, the Department asked Australians to report seed mailings using a website.

In February 2021, USDA APHIS issued new rules regarding buying and selling seeds and live plants from other countries.

==== Resolution ====
Amazon has stated that all of the orders it looked into were legitimate orders, in statements in summer 2020 and March 2021; a specific brusher or set of brushers responsible for the seed orders were never identified, and the USDA had not found "direct evidence of brushing". By the beginning of October 2020, the USDA and Louisiana Department of Agriculture and Forestry considered the mystery largely solved, blaming both real seed orders that were merely mailed from locations the buyers did not expect, and truly unsolicited mailings. An Atlantic investigation in 2021 found that many of the people reporting unsolicited seeds had seed orders in their Amazon ordering history they had forgotten about, often many months before and shipping long-delayed, or were part of "gift groups" with public wish lists that others could order items for them, concluding, "in every single case that we were able to research fully, we found a convincing connection between a mystery package and an earlier order."

== Prohibitions ==
China's e-commerce laws and regulations prohibit brushing. In August 2024 the Federal Trade Commission announced a final rule that prohibits the sale or purchase of fake consumer reviews and testimonials. The rule lets the agency seek civil penalties against knowing violators and was set to take effect 60 days after its publication in the Federal Register.
