= Kuaishou =

Chinese video application company

Kuaishou Technology
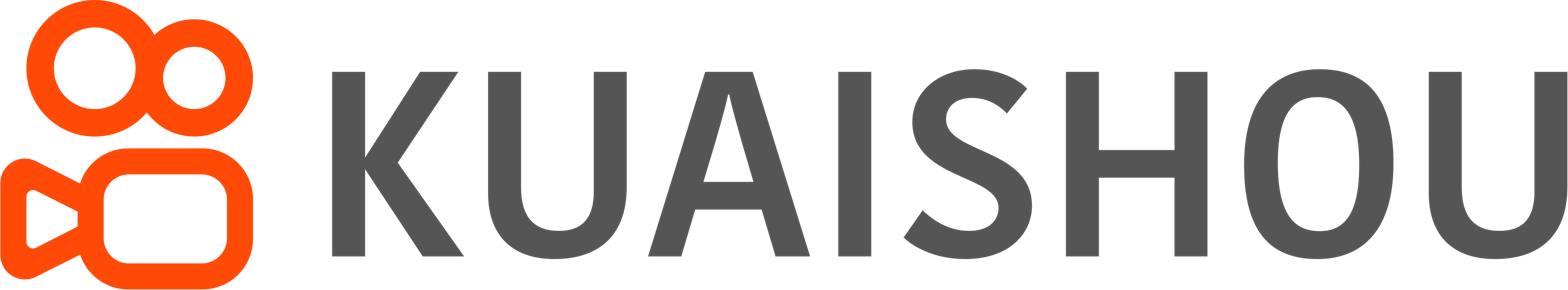

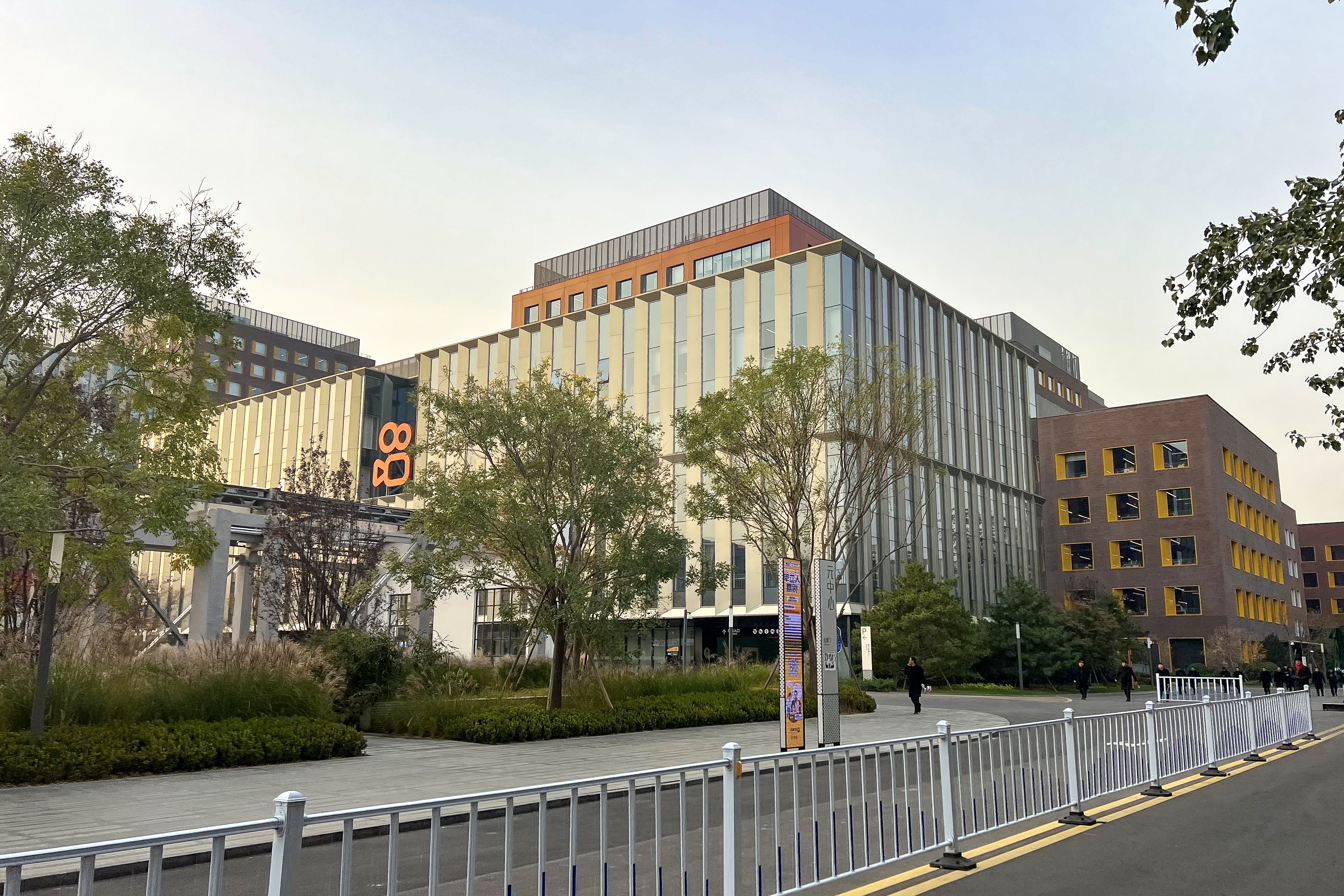
- Headquarter in Haidian, Beijing
- Native name: 快手
- Type: Public company; partially state-owned
- Traded as: SEHK: 1024
- Industry: Internet
- Founded: March 2011; 15 years ago
- Founder: Su Hua, Cheng Yixiao
- Headquarters: Beijing, China
- Key people: Su Hua (CEO)
- Revenue: ▲CN¥127 billion (US$17.39 billion, FY2024)
- Owner: China Internet Investment Fund; Beijing Radio and Television Station
- Number of employees: 24,718 (FY2024)
- Website: www.kuaishou.com

Kuaishou
- Simplified Chinese: 快手
- Literal meaning: quick hand
Transcriptions
Standard Mandarin
- Hanyu Pinyin: Kuàishǒu

Kwai
- Developer: Kuaishou Technology
- Operating system: iOS; iPadOS; Android
- Type: Video sharing
- License: Proprietary software
- Website: kwai.com

Kuaishou Technology is a Chinese publicly traded partly state-owned holding company based in Haidian District, Beijing, that was founded in 2011 by Su Hua (Chinese: 宿华) and Cheng Yixiao (Chinese: 程一笑). The company, listed on the Hong Kong Stock Exchange, is known for developing a mobile app for sharing users' short videos, a social network, and video special effects editor. The app is known as Kwai in many countries outside of China. It is also known as Snack Video in India, Pakistan and Indonesia.

== Ownership and governance ==
Kuaishou's overseas team is led by the former CEO of the application 99, and staff from Google, Facebook, Netflix, and TikTok were recruited to lead the company's international expansion.

The China Internet Investment Fund, a state-owned enterprise controlled by the Cyberspace Administration of China, holds a golden share ownership stake in Kuaishou.

== History ==
Kuaishou is China's first short video platform that was developed in 2011 by engineer Hua Su and Cheng Yixiao. Prior to co-founding Kuaishou, Su Hua had worked for both Google and Baidu as a software engineer. The company is headquartered in Haidian District, Beijing.

Kuaishou uses a decentralised content distribution model based on an inclusive value-based algorithm. The platform has a virtual screening area for watching user-generated short videos and a public space for online socialising.

Kuaishou's predecessor "GIF Kuaishou" was founded in March 2011. GIF Kuaishou was a mobile app with which users could make and share GIF pictures. In 2013, Kuaishou became a short-video social platform. By 2013, the app had reached 100 million daily users. By 2019, it had exceeded 200 million active daily users.

In March 2017, Kuaishou closed a US$350 million investment round that was led by Tencent. In January 2018, Forbes estimated the company's valuation to be US$18 billion.

In April 2018, Kuaishou's app was briefly banned from Chinese app stores after China Central Television (CCTV) reported on the platform popularizing videos of teenage mothers.

In 2019, the company announced a partnership with the People's Daily, an official newspaper of the Central Committee of the Chinese Communist Party, to help it experiment with the use of artificial intelligence in news.

In June 2020, following the start of the 2020–2021 China–India skirmishes, the Government of India banned Kwai along with 58 other apps, citing "data and privacy issues".

In January 2021, Kuaishou announced it was planning an initial public offering (IPO) to raise approximately US$5 billion. Kuaishou's stock completed its first day of trading at $300 Hong Kong dollars (HKD) (US$38.70), more than doubling its initial offer price, and causing its market value to rise to over $1 trillion HKD (US$159 billion).

In February 2021, Kuaishou made a debut on the Hong Kong Stock Exchange, with its shares soaring by 194% at the opening. The company subsequently encountered major setbacks as a result of heightened regulatory restrictions on Chinese internet firms, which contributed to its share price falling by nearly 80% from its post-IPO peak. By December 2021, Kuaishou announced a major reorganization, including the layoff of 30% of its staff, primarily targeting mid-level employees earning an annual salary of $157,000 or more. This restructuring aimed to cut costs and mitigate financial losses.

In October 2022, state-owned Beijing Radio and Television Station took a minority ownership stake in Kuaishou.

In April 2024, a Financial Times article citing current and former Kuaishou employees stated that the company has been running an ageist redundancy programme known internally as "Limestone", culling workers in their mid-30s. In June 2024, Kuaishou and the Sichuan international communication center launched a branch center in São Paulo, Brazil.

In June 2024, Kuaishou released its diffusion transformer text-to-video model, Kling, which they claimed could generate two minutes of video at 30 frames per second and in 1080p resolution. The model has been compared to that of OpenAI's Sora text-to-video model. It is accessible to the public on Kuaishou's video editing app KwaiCut via signing up for a waitlist with a Chinese phone number.

In December 2025, Kuaishou came under a cyberattack which led to a temporary influx of violent and pornographic content.

== Popularity ==
As of 2019, it had a worldwide user base of over 200 million, leading the "Most Downloaded" lists of the Google Play and Apple App Store in eight countries, such as Brazil, where it was introduced in 2019. Its main short-video platform competitor was Douyin, which is known as TikTok outside China.

As of 2021, Kuaishou had a monthly average of 777 million active users, 25% of whom created content.

According to the platform, more than 240 million users earn income via the app (for example, through virtual gifts or live-streaming e-commerce) as of 2021.

As of 2022, users spend an average of 128.1 minutes per day on the app.

Compared to Douyin, Kuaishou is more popular with older users living outside China's Tier 1 cities. Its initial popularity came from videos of Chinese rural life. The app is particularly well known for its "rustic" aesthetic and is popular among rural people.

Kuaishou also relied more on e-commerce revenue than on advertising revenue compared to its main competitor.

== Reception ==
Kwai (as the app is called outside of China) was banned in India in 2020 along with other short video apps like TikTok. Kuaishou then released the clone SnackVideo, which was subsequently also banned. The app is one of the most popular social media platforms in Brazil, where Kuaishou partnered with creators to make telenovela style content, and appeals to football fans by working with football teams CR Flamengo and Santos FC and sponsoring the tournament Copa América. Kwai was notable in Brazil for spreading information (and misinformation) about the COVID-19 vaccine and political misinformation.

=== Manjiao Wenhua ===
"Manjiao wenhua" (慢脚文化) is a sarcastic term on Chinese internet, referenceing the unethical or illegal content on Kuaishou. State broadcaster China Central Television (CCTV) reported that much of the content is about child pregnancy. "Dating, pregnancy, bearing a child...these are strictly prohibited in the real time by a minor, but these contents can easily shown to audiences here." In addition, many students from primary or secondary schools could be seen making a pose of smoking. Wang Zhenhui (王贞会) from CUPSL stated that these kinds of bad values will give a negative effect to the minors.

== See also ==
- List of Kuaishou original programming
- List of content platforms by monthly active users
