= Amazon Prime Video =

American video streaming service

Prime Video
- Prime Video's logo used since 2024

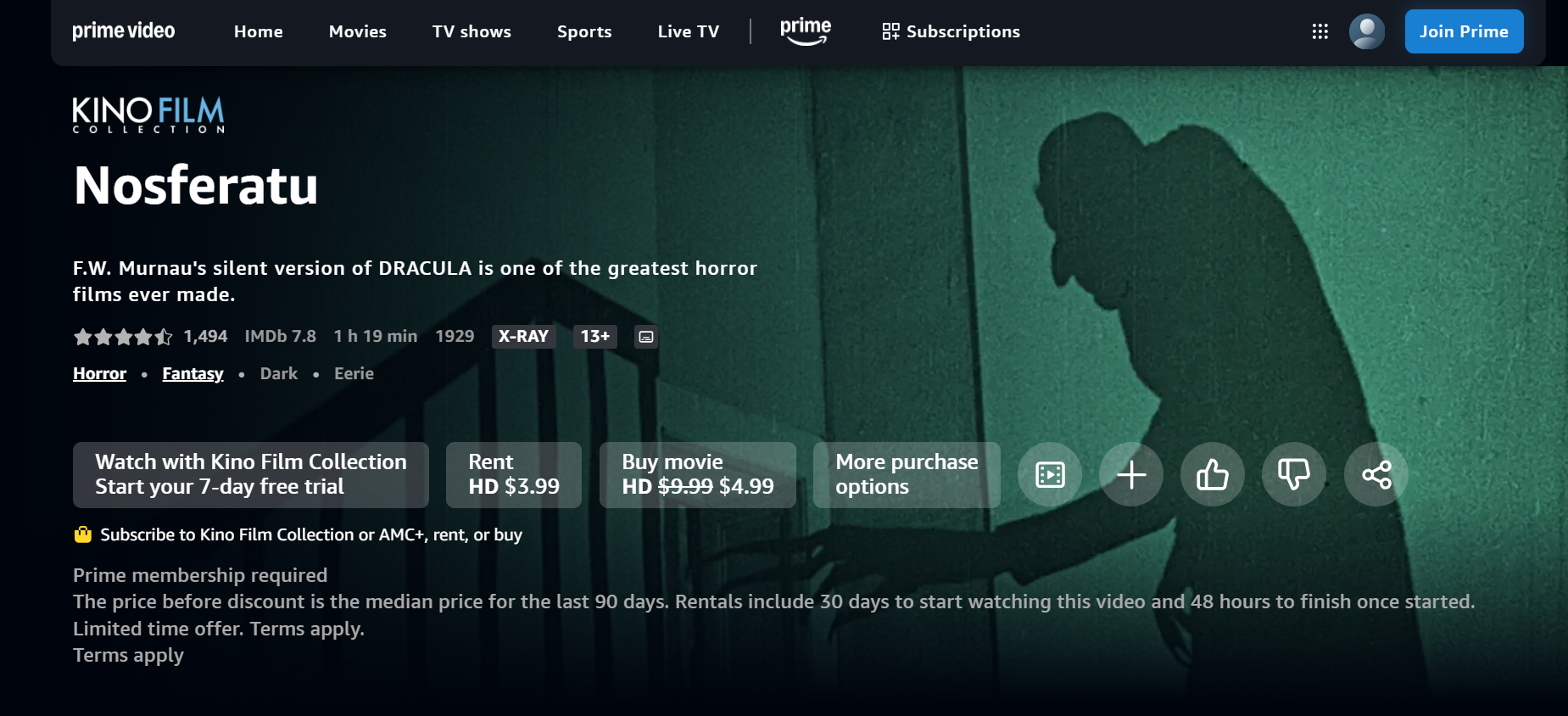
- Screenshot Screenshot of Prime Video's international website in January 2025, including a public domain film, Nosferatu
- Company type: Division
- Website type: OTT platform
- Available in: 30 languages
- List of languages: Arabic; Bengali; Chinese; Czech; Danish; Dutch; English; Filipino; Finnish; French; German; Greek; Hebrew; Hindi; Hungarian; Indonesian; Italian; Japanese; Kannada; Korean; Malay; Malayalam; Marathi; Norwegian; Polish; Portuguese; Romanian; Russian; Spanish; Swedish; Tamil; Telugu; Turkish
- Headquarters: Seattle, Washington, US
- Country of origin: United States
- Area served: Worldwide (except Belarus, mainland China, Crimea, Cuba, Iran, North Korea, Russia, Sudan, Syria, and Vietnam)
- Owner: Amazon
- Industry: Entertainment; mass media
- Products: Streaming media; video on demand; digital distribution
- Services: Film production; film distribution; television production; television distribution
- Subsidiaries: Prime Video Slate; Bray Film Studios
- Website: www.primevideo.com
- Commercial: Yes
- Registration: Required
- Users: ▲205 million (as of August 2025)
- Launched: September 7, 2006; 20 years ago
- Current status: Active

Amazon Prime Video, known simply as Prime Video or Amazon Video, is an American subscription video on-demand over-the-top streaming television service owned by Amazon. The service primarily distributes films and television series produced or co-produced by Amazon MGM Studios or licensed to Amazon, as Amazon Originals, and also hosts content from other providers, content add-ons, live sporting events, and video rental and purchasing services. Prime Video is offered both as a standalone service and as part of Amazon's Prime subscription. Amazon Prime Video is the second-most-subscribed video on demand streaming media service after Netflix, with about 205 million paid memberships worldwide.

In some places, the service requires a full Prime subscription to access. In the United States, United Kingdom, and Germany, it can be accessed without a full Prime subscription, while in Australia, Canada, France, India, Turkey, and Italy, it can be accessed only on a dedicated website. Additionally, Prime Video offers a content add-on service in the form of channels, called Amazon Channels, or Prime Video Channels, which allow users to subscribe to additional video subscription services from other content providers within Prime Video.

Launched on September 7, 2006, as Amazon Unbox in the United States, the service grew with an expanding library and added the Prime Video membership upon the development of the Prime subscription. It was later renamed Amazon Instant Video on Demand. After acquiring the UK-based streaming and DVD-by-mail service LoveFilm in 2011, Prime Video was added to the Prime subscription in the United Kingdom, Germany, and Austria in 2014; continuing the plan of LoveFilm Instant, it is available on a monthly subscription of £/€8.99 per month. The service was available in Norway, Denmark, and Sweden, until 2013. On April 18, 2016, Amazon split Prime Video from Amazon Prime in the US for $8.99 per month.

On December 14, 2016, Prime Video launched worldwide (except for mainland China, Crimea, Cuba, Iran, North Korea, Sudan, and Syria) expanding its reach beyond the United States, United Kingdom, Germany, Austria, and Japan. Among the new territories, the service was included with Prime in Belgium, Brazil, Canada, France, India, Ireland, Italy, Poland, Turkey, and Spain; in all other countries, it was made available for $/€2.99 per month for the first six months and $/€5.99 per month thereafter.

Alongside Amazon MGM Studios, Prime Video constitutes one half of Amazon's membership in the Motion Picture Association (MPA), which it joined on October 1, 2024.

== History ==
The service debuted on September 7, 2006, as Amazon Unbox in the United States. On September 4, 2008, the service was renamed Amazon Video on Demand.

As of August 2014 the service is no longer available for downloading purchased instant videos. On February 22, 2011, the service rebranded as Amazon Instant Video and added access to 5,000 movies and television shows for Amazon Prime members, including content from Sony Pictures, Warner Bros. Entertainment, PBS, BBC, Magnolia Pictures, IFC Films and National Geographic. On February 8, 2012, Amazon signed a deal with Viacom to add shows from MTV, Nickelodeon, Comedy Central, TV Land, VH1, CMT, Spike, BET, and Logo TV to Prime Instant Video. On March 14, 2012, Amazon signed a deal with Discovery Communications, Inc. to add shows from Discovery Channel, Science Channel, TLC, Animal Planet, Military Channel and Investigation Discovery to the Prime Instant Video service. On May 23, 2012, Amazon partnered with movie studio Paramount Pictures to stream hundreds of movies on the service. On June 13, 2012, Amazon announced a deal with Metro-Goldwyn-Mayer to stream movies and television shows on the Prime Instant Video service. On July 20, 2012, Amazon announced a deal with Warner Bros. Television to stream two shows The West Wing and Fringe exclusively on Prime Instant Video. On September 4, 2012, Amazon signed a deal with pay-television channel Epix (now known as MGM+ and since March 2022 owned by Amazon itself) to feature movies on their streaming service, in a move to rival their competitor Netflix. On December 17, 2012, Amazon announced a deal with Turner Broadcasting System to stream two shows from TNT, The Closer and Falling Skies. In January 2013, Amazon signed a deal with A+E Networks to stream shows from A&E, The Biography Channel, History Channel and Lifetime networks. In April 2013, Amazon premiered the comedies Alpha House and Betas, original series available exclusively online via the Prime Instant Video service. Amazon offered the first three episodes of both series at once for free, with each subsequent episode released weekly thereafter for Prime members. In July 2013, Prime Instant Video began streaming movie titles from Miramax.

In 2014, Amazon announced that the streaming service of its UK subsidiary LoveFilm would fold into the Instant Video service on February 26. In January 2015, Transparent became the first show produced by Amazon Studios to win a major award and the first series from a streaming video service to win the Golden Globe Award for Best Television Series – Musical or Comedy.

On July 30, 2015, Amazon announced that it had hired Jeremy Clarkson, Richard Hammond, and James May to produce an untitled motoring show for Amazon Prime Video that was later named The Grand Tour. Neither Jeff Bezos nor Amazon said how much Clarkson, Hammond, or May were paid to produce the program via their production company The Grand Tour, but Bezos said the deal was "very expensive but worth it". The show's budget was not officially announced, but former Top Gear executive producer Andy Wilman said each episode had a budget of around £4.5 million, nine times larger than Top Gear's budget. Also in July, Amazon announced plans to expand the service to India.

In September 2015, the word "Instant" was dropped from its title in the US, and it was renamed Amazon Video. In November 2016, the Wall Street Journal reported that Amazon was pursuing streaming rights to US professional sports leagues to further differentiate the service.

Amazon announced in November 2016 that it planned to stream The Grand Tour globally, which led to speculation over whether the full Prime Video service would begin a wider international rollout to compete with Netflix. On December 14, 2016, Prime Video expanded into 200 more territories. In 2017, Amazon Studios purchased the global television adaption rights to The Lord of the Rings, the product of which, The Lord of the Rings: The Rings of Power, streams on Prime Video. On October 12, 2017, Amazon announced an agreement with DHX Media to stream 13 shows, including Caillou, Johnny Test, Yo Gabba Gabba!, Inspector Gadget, and In the Night Garden... on Prime Video. On April 4, 2019, Amazon announced an agreement with The Jim Henson Company to stream select Henson programming on Prime Video. In 2020, Prime Video expanded its marketing campaigns and local productions to Latin America with El Presidente (Chile & Colombia), La Jauría (Chile), and Súbete a mi moto.

On May 17, 2021, Amazon entered negotiations to acquire Hollywood studio Metro-Goldwyn-Mayer (MGM). On May 26, it was announced that Amazon would acquire MGM for $8.45 billion, subject to regulatory approvals and other routine closing conditions, with MGM continuing to operate as a label alongside Amazon Studios and Amazon Prime Video. The deal closed on March 17, 2022, after receiving all governmental approvals. In July 2021, Amazon and Universal Pictures reached a multi-year deal to bring Universal's films to Prime Video, as well as IMDb TV (now Amazon Freevee). As part of the deal, titles from Universal's library and future theatrical releases would become available on Amazon's streaming services after their first pay window and four months after release on Peacock. The deal makes major franchises such as Fast & Furious, Jurassic Park, and Bourne eligible to stream on Prime Video. Prime Video later signed a deal with Nigerian studio Anthill Studios. This was part of its expansion to Nigeria, where Prime Video offers its services at subsidized rates while publishing original Nigerian content on the platform tagged Prime Video Naija.

On February 9, 2022, Amazon signed a long-term deal with Shepperton Studios for exclusive use of new production facilities. On July 31, 2022, it was announced that the service would expand to Southeast Asia, and be offered in Indonesia, Thailand, and the Philippines. The offerings would include localized content, as well as localized interface and subtitles for non-local content. In January 2024, it decided to cut the original productions for both Southeast Asia and Middle East and North Africa as it shifted on European productions and even licensing. Similar layoffs took place in West and South Africa divisions a few months later amid competition with Showmax.

In December 2024, Amazon Prime Video announced significant changes to its operations in India to enhance customer satisfaction and comply with local regulations. These updates included some drastic changes to its subscription model in India, reflecting Amazon's effort to cater to Indian users' preferences in a highly competitive OTT market.

== Content ==
=== Creative executives ===
Amazon Prime Video and Amazon MGM Studios (television and film) are led by Mike Hopkins, with Peter Friedlander joining him in September 2025 as Head of Global Television. Under Friedlander, Blair Fetter is Head of Worldbuilding Genre, Tom Lieber is Head of Worldbuilding (under Fetter), Jen Chambers is Head of Creative Synergy, Kelly Day is Head of International Television, Nicole Clemens is Head of International Original Television, Melissa Wolfe is Head of Animation, Jenn Levy is Head of Unscripted, Lauren O'Connor is Head of Global IP, and Lindsay Sloane is Head of MGM Television.

=== Amazon Channels ===
In 2015, Amazon launched the Streaming Partners Program (now known as Amazon Channels), a platform offering subscription-based third-party channels (a la carte subscription services) and streaming services to Amazon Prime subscribers through the Amazon Video platform. These services are separate from the Amazon Video offering and must be purchased separately. The original launch in the US included services such as Curiosity Stream, Lifetime Movie Club, AMC's Shudder, Showtime, and Starz. The service then added other partners, such as HBO, Cinemax, Boomerang, Discovery Channel, Fandor, Noggin, PBS Kids, Seeso, and Toku. In January 2017, Amazon announced Anime Strike, an anime-focused Amazon Channels service. In May 2017, Amazon Channels expanded into Germany and the UK; in the UK, the company reached deals to offer channels from Discovery Communications (including Eurosport), and live/on-demand content from ITV.

Anime Strike and Heera (a Channel devoted to Indian films and series) were discontinued as separate services, and their content was merged into the main Prime Video library at no additional charge.

=== Sports programming ===
In April 2017, Amazon began to make sports-related content acquisitions, first acquiring non-exclusive rights to stream parts of the NFL's Thursday Night Football games during the 2017 NFL season to Prime subscribers in the United States as part of a $50 million deal, replacing a previous deal with Twitter. In August, Amazon acquired the British television rights to the ATP World Tour beginning in 2019, replacing Sky Sports. The deal ran until 2023 and exclusively showed all masters 1000 events and 12 500 and 250 series tournaments. Amazon was the third-party pay TV provider for the ATP finals and starting in 2018 for Queens Club and Eastbourne tournaments. In September the ATP announced a two-year deal for Amazon to stream the Next Generation ATP Finals. In November it was announced that Amazon had acquired the British television rights to the US Open for five years from the 2018 edition, for a reported £30 million. Eurosport, which owned the pan-European rights, extended its deal with the US Open but excluded the UK, even though Amazon had reached a deal with the broadcaster to stream its channels. The ATP also announced that Amazon would screen the tennis channel Tennis TV in the US from 2018.

In June 2018, it was announced that Amazon had secured the UK rights to broadcast 20 live Premier League football matches from the 2019–20 season on a three-year deal. This was the first time the league was shown on a domestic live streaming service as opposed to exclusively on television. The deal was later extended another three years, until the 2024–25 season. On March 18, 2021, Prime Video announced that it had renewed its deal to be the exclusive broadcaster of Thursday Night Football between the 2022 and 2033 seasons in the US. Because Prime Video is a subscription service, the NFL requires Amazon to syndicate the games to over-the-air television stations in the teams' local markets.

On July 1, 2022, it was announced that Amazon had acquired a share of the UK rights to the UEFA Champions League beginning in the 2024–25 season, holding rights to 17 Tuesday-night matches. TNT Sports continues to hold the remainder of the rights.

On July 24, 2024, Prime Video announced an 11-year agreement with the NBA beginning in the 2025–26 season, including 66 regular season games in the US, the NBA Cup semifinals and finals, all NBA Play-In Tournament games, and selected playoff games (including one conference final in odd-numbered years).

== Advertising ==
At the end of January 2024, the service began featuring "limited" advertisements. Avoiding them would cost an additional $2.99 per month. Prime Video joined many other streaming services in featuring ads, which can be more lucrative than ad-free options.

The ad-supported tier is available in select markets, such as the US, Canada, the UK, and some European territories.

== Availability ==
=== Requirements ===
Availability of Prime Video in the world as of September 2026

Prime Video is available worldwide (except for mainland China, Crimea, Cuba, Iran, North Korea, Sudan, Russia, Belarus, Syria and Vietnam). Initially it was available only to residents of the United States, United Kingdom, Japan, Germany and Austria.

The service supports online streaming via web player, as well as apps on Amazon Fire-branded devices, and supported third-party mobile devices, digital media players (particularly Roku), video game consoles, and smart TVs. An Android TV app is also available, which was initially exclusive to Sony Bravia smart TVs running Android TV, and Nvidia Shield.

Amazon had historically withheld support for Apple TV and Google's Chromecast platform. In October 2015, it banned the sale of those devices on its online marketplace because they do not support the Prime Video ecosystem. Critics said Amazon was displaying protectionism against devices that could compete with its Amazon Fire TV products. But in December 2017, Amazon released an Apple TV app for Prime Video, and in April 2019 it announced that it would add Chromecast support to the Prime Video mobile app and perform a wider release of Prime Video's Android TV app. This was delivered in July 2020 as part of concessions to restore access to YouTube on Fire TV devices after a related feud with Google.

In most countries, a Prime Video subscription can be paid for with debit and credit cards. Amazon Gift Card balance generally cannot be used for recurring subscription orders, but there is an exception for customers in Mexico. As of 2023, some countries (such as France, Italy, Spain, Mexico, Canada, Netherlands, Saudi Arabia, Luxembourg, and Portugal) have added support for paying Amazon Prime subscription fees with Amazon Gift Card balance; this does not apply to content add-ons such as Prime Video Channels (See: Amazon Prime#Availability). In August 2022, customers in Indonesia, the Philippines, and Thailand could start making payments using digital wallets (such as DANA, OVO, GoPay, ShopeePay, GCash, Maya, Rabbit LINE Pay, and TrueMoney).

In April 2020, Amazon and Apple formed a deal that allowed Amazon to process in-app payments on the iOS Prime Video app without using Apple's official in-app purchase mechanism. Apple's official in-app purchase mechanism is used when a user does not have an existing Prime subscription. This move was considered notable as most apps on the App Store are not allowed to use their own payment processors; in-app transactions for digital content must be handled by Apple. In May 2022, Amazon disallowed iOS and Android users from making in-app purchases on several of Amazon's digital storefronts, including Kindle, Audible, and Music apps, due to disputes over transaction fees.

=== Website ===
In countries where the Amazon video-on-demand store is available (for purchasing/renting movies & television shows) and are part of the initial batch of locations to roll out Prime Video (from 2006 to 2015), Prime Video is offered on the local Amazon website (e.g. amazon.com, amazon.de, amazon.co.uk etc.).

Although a local Amazon website might be available, the full range of digital content services (e.g. Amazon Music, Amazon Video, Kindle Store) might not be available in that particular country. In countries which do not support purchasing/renting movies & television shows or began rolling out Prime Video after the international expansion on December 14, 2016, Prime Video is offered as a standalone service on a separate website. Amazon Gift Card balance can be used to buy/rent individual titles on local Amazon websites, but not on primevideo.com. In Brazil, a similar Amazon Video was launched, but under the name Loja Prime Video ("Prime Video Shop"), and for renting of movies only.

Country	Amazon Video (Video on demand)	Prime Video (Streaming service)	Use of Amazon Gift Card balance	Domain name
United States	Buy/Rent	Streaming	Pay for movie purchases Pay for Amazon Prime subscription	amazon.com/primevideo
United Kingdom	Buy/Rent	Streaming	Pay for movie purchases Pay for Amazon Prime subscription	amazon.co.uk/primevideo
Germany	Buy/Rent	Streaming	Pay for movie purchases Pay for Amazon Prime subscription	amazon.de/primevideo
Japan	Buy/Rent	Streaming	Pay for movie purchases Pay for Amazon Prime subscription	amazon.co.jp/primevideo
Australia, Belgium, Bulgaria, Brazil, Canada, Chile, Colombia, Croatia, Czechia, Cyprus, Denmark, Finland, Estonia, France, French Polynesia, Guadeloupe, Greece, Hungary, Iceland, Ireland, Italy, Latvia, Lithuania, Luxembourg, Malta, Martinique, Mexico, Netherlands, New Zealand, Norway, Poland, Portugal, Réunion, Romania, Serbia, Slovenia, Slovakia, Spain, Sweden, Switzerland, Turkey, Ukraine.	Buy/Rent	Streaming	Pay for Amazon Prime subscription (for selected countries)	primevideo.com
India	Rent	Streaming	—	primevideo.com
Other Countries (including countries without a local Amazon website)	No	Streaming	—	primevideo.com

== Metadata ==
=== Video quality ===
Depending on the device, Amazon supports up to 4K (UHD) and high-dynamic-range (HDR) streaming. UHD/HDR rolled out with its original content. Other titles support 1080p (HD) streaming with 5.1 Dolby Digital or Dolby Digital Plus audio, with Dolby Atmos coming soon to certain titles. For titles available for purchase (and not included in a customer's Amazon Prime subscription), the HD option is often offered at an additional price.

On March 18, 2020, Thierry Breton, a European commissioner in charge of digital policy of the European Union urged streaming services including Amazon Prime Video to limit their services. The request came as a result of the prevention of Europe's broadband networks from crashing as tens of millions of people started remote work due to the COVID-19 pandemic. The EU wanted the streaming platforms to offer only standard definition, rather than high-definition, programs and make users responsible for their data consumption. On March 20, 2020, Amazon said it had already begun to reduce streaming bitrates while maintaining a quality streaming: "We support the need for careful management of telecom services to ensure they can handle the increased internet demand with so many people now at home full-time due to COVID-19. Prime Video is working with local authorities and Internet Service Providers where needed to help mitigate any network congestion."

=== Devices ===
Manufacturer	Product	Type	Quality		Notes	Ref.
Manufacturer	Product	Type	Video	Audio	Notes	Ref.
Amazon	Kindle Fire	Tablet	1080p	Up to Dolby Atmos support		
Amazon	Fire Phone	Smartphone	1080p	—N/a	Discontinued on the Amazon website	
Amazon	Fire TV	Digital media player	Up to 4K Ultra HD	Up to Dolby Digital Plus 5.1, Dolby Atmos support		
Amazon	Fire TV Stick	Digital media player	Up to 4K Ultra HD	Up to Dolby Digital Plus 5.1, Dolby Atmos support		
Amazon	Windows app	Personal computer	1080p	Stereo		
Apple	iPhone	Smartphone	Up to 1080p	—N/a		
Apple	iPad	Tablet	Up to 1080p	Up to loudspeaker support		
Apple	Apple TV	Digital media player	Up to 4K Ultra HD	Up to Dolby Digital 5.1, Dolby Atmos	Available on third generation models and newer, Dolby Digital 5.1 on fourth generation or newer, 4K HDR and Dolby Atmos on fifth generation.	
Google	Android	Mobile operating system	Varies		Application available on Google Play. Varies through device and version.	
LG	2010+ models	Smart television	Varies		Only select 2010 LG Smart TV and Blu-ray player models and up	
Nvidia	Shield TV	Digital media player	Up to 4K Ultra HD			
Nvidia	Shield TV Pro	Digital media player	Up to 4K Ultra HD			
Microsoft	Xbox 360	Home video game console	Up to 1080i	Up to Dolby Digital 5.1 support	May vary depending on console specifications and models	
Microsoft	Xbox One	Home video game console	Up to 1080p	Dolby Atmos support		
Microsoft	Xbox One S & X	Home video game console	Up to 4K Ultra HD	Dolby Atmos support		
Microsoft	Xbox Series X & S	Home video game console	Up to 4K Ultra HD	Dolby Atmos support		
Nintendo	Wii	Home video game console	480p	Analog stereo	Support discontinued on January 31, 2019	
Nintendo	Wii U	Home video game console	Up to 1080p	LPCM 5.1	Support discontinued on September 26, 2019	
Roku	Roku 1	Digital media player	Up to 1080p	HDMI out	Supported as an app (channel) running on the Roku OS	
Roku	Roku 2	Digital media player	Up to 1080p	HDMI out	Supported as an app (channel) running on the Roku OS	
Roku	Roku LT	Digital media player	Up to 720p	HDMI out	Supported as an app (channel) running on the Roku OS	
Roku	Roku 3	Digital media player	Up to 1080p	HDMI out	Supported as an app (channel) running on the Roku OS	
Roku	Roku 4	Digital media player	Up to 4K Ultra HD	HDMI out	Supported as an app (channel) running on the Roku OS	
Samsung	2010+ models	Smart television	Varies		Only select 2010 Samsung Smart TV and Blu-ray player models and up	
Sony	BRAVIA	2015+ Android TV	Up to 4K Ultra HD	Up to Dolby Digital Plus 7.1		
Sony	PlayStation 3	Home video game console	Up to 1080p	LPCM Dolby Digital 5.1		
Sony	PlayStation 4	Home video game console	Up to 1080p	LPCM Dolby Digital Plus 7.1		
Sony	PlayStation 4 Pro	Home video game console	Up to 4K Ultra HD	LPCM Dolby Digital Plus 7.1		
Sony	PlayStation 5	Home video game console	Up to 4K Ultra HD	LPCM Dolby Digital Plus 7.1		
Sony	PlayStation Vita	Handheld game console	nHD	Stereo		
Sony	PlayStation TV	Microconsole	HDMI out	LPCM Stereo		

== Awards and nominations ==
Year	Association	Category	Nominee(s)	Result
2017	Diversity in Media Awards	Broadcaster of the Year	Amazon Video UK	Won
