= TrueMoney =

Financial company

TrueMoney International
- Company type: Private
- Industry: E-payment, Fintech
- Founded: 2003; 23 years ago
- Headquarters: Phra Khanong, Thailand, Bangkok
- Area served: Asia
- Key people: Tanyapong Thamavaranukupt; Monsinee Nakapanant
- Number of employees: 1000
- Parent: True Corporation (formerly); Ascend Group
- Website: https://www.truemoney.com

TrueMoney is a financial technology brand, providing e-payment services in Southeast Asia. In Thailand, the platform includes TrueMoney Wallet, WeCard by MasterCard, TrueMoney Cash Card, Kiosk, Express, Payment Gateway and Remittance.

== History ==
TrueMoney was founded in 2003 as part of True Corporation but now reorganized under Ascend Group in 2014, a spin-off of True Corporation and a subsidiary of Charoen Pokphand Group.

TrueMoney features a remittance service, and has initiated cross-border remittance from Myanmar and Cambodia, to Thailand.

=== Products ===
- Payment gateway
- Stored value card
- Electronic bill payment
- Cash on delivery
- Controlled payment number

== Regional expansion ==
TrueMoney has offices in Thailand, Vietnam, Cambodia, Myanmar, Indonesia and the Philippines. TrueMoney has licenses to operate e-money in almost every Southeast Asian country. As the flagship venture, Thailand's TrueMoney counts Google and Alipay as partner payment platforms.

== See also ==
- PayPal
- Paysbuy
