= E-commerce in Pakistan =

National industry

Pakistan's e-trading mainly involves buying and selling goods and services using the internet or telephone, through the use of electronic means such as computer, fax machine, cellular phone, automated teller machines (ATMs), and other electronic appliances with or without using the internet. Online banking, e-tickets, and share trading on a stock exchange are a few examples of e-commerce of modern advancement. The unique feature of online trading is that an investor logging in from anywhere can conduct transactions with nearly any device, via the internet. Inexperienced traders are also able to familiarize themselves with helpful investment tools, which are widely available on the internet.

== Electronic trading under e-commerce ==
The term e-trading (or electronic trading) covers a series of systems ranging from simple order transmission service to full-fledged trade execution. e-trade is location neutral and scalable, mainly providing electronic orders executed from users to the system owned by the seller or manufacturer. Electronic distribution of offer with the provision of transaction details – i.e., description of the offer, quality, cost, guarantee, validity, discounts, quantity etc. – is carried out through automated trade execution. Most commonly, three categories are well recognized under e-commerce, namely:

(i) Business-to-consumer (B2C) e-commerce: customers deal directly with the organization, avoiding any intermediaries
(ii) Business-to-business (B2B) participants are organizations
(iii) Consumer-to-consumer (C2C) participants are individuals, with one serving as the buyer and the other as the seller

E-commerce encompasses various commerce activities—such as the sale, purchase, transfer, or exchange of products, services, and information—carried out using electronic means and technologies. In a broader sense, it typically refers to online transactions. While the terms "e-commerce" and "e-business" are often used interchangeably, they represent distinct concepts. E-commerce primarily involves three types of integration, whereas e-business entails four, making the latter more complex. The e-marketplace is a form of e-commerce that facilitates online trading and shopping, serving as a platform where buyers and sellers exchange goods, services, money or information.

E-commerce in Pakistan was first started in 2001. With the ban of PayPal services in Pakistan, eCommerce business companies and merchants had to rely on cash on delivery, and bank payment methods. There was no dedicated online payment service operating in Pakistan, which was also not favorable for online buyers in Pakistan. However, the need was fulfilled to an extent with the launch of mobile payment systems in Pakistan. In October 2009, Telenor launched "Easypaisa" Mobile Account Service through which users could pay bills, transfer money domestically, internationally and can even save money in their Easy Paisa Mobile Account. It is no secret that Pakistan has one of the lowest literacy rates in the world and is suffering from an epidemic-level education and learning crisis. Currently the literacy rate of Pakistan is around 59%. Its adverse effects can also be seen in the field of information technology.

== Online trading ==
With the introduction of information technology, E-commerce is producing new fast-growing areas like online buying and selling of financial instruments. For example, shares of public or private limited companies over the Internet, which includes the sale and purchase of commodities, currencies, and gold. With the introduction of the World Wide Web, many transactions can be conducted using a computer or mobile phone through proprietary software. Customers can purchase a wide range of products and services from various industries. Online trade or e-trade is one of the fastest growing electronic commerce markets globally.

=== Online stores ===
To maintain the progress of active online customers, Pakistan's e-commerce portal hosts more than 1.2 million visitors on its website every month and presents a selection of over 400 products and 16,000 merchandise. E-commerce is likely to develop at a fast rate if the challenge for customer satisfaction and operational efficiency is ensured at a marginal level. Web or phone-based sell/purchase of grocery covers a vast area with good volume and variety. In the recent past, a number of different online grocery stores have started in Pakistan by selling domestic consumer items like rice, lentils, daals, oils, fruit, and vegetables, including household and personal items e.g. washing powder, shampoos, and toothpaste.

Many other sites have been established with the aim of fashion-oriented exports. Today a number of small and medium-scale online stores are conducting business across Pakistan with the delivery of purchased items at the doorstep of their consumers.

In January 2021, a joint venture, and online marketplace, namely leyjao claimed successful collaboration with the sellers during the covid-19 strenuous days, when shopkeepers were incapable of opening their shops during the lockdown, so they stepped in and supported them to sell their essential goods, which were permitted during those days.

== Investment and finance ==
Shares trading in stock exchange can provide rewards and investment in stocks may increase in value besides paying dividends to its investor. Shareholders receive rewards when the company performs well and the value of shares goes up. But if the company does poorly, the share price falls down and the value of an investment will be reduced. Among other issues, the performance of shares market, economic environment, and political stability are all responsible for an increase or decrease in the value of investments. Therefore, trading in the shares market is regarded as an investment in "risk capital". Strength to sustain this risk with careful planning results in reward and shareholders can receive the prospective return on their investment as much higher than that on other investments.

=== Shares-trading ===
All companies engaged in stock trading with or without online trading platform are required to observe the Securities and Exchange Commission of Pakistan as the financial regulatory agency in Pakistan for their business. Online share trading in Pakistan is available in 3 stock markets Karachi Stock Exchange (KSE), Lahore Stock Exchange (LSE) and Islamabad Stock Exchange (ISE). An investor with a minimum amount of Pakistani Rupees 25,000/ to 1,00,000/ (or equivalent) can open an account with broker and do stock trade online. Online trading can be availed by resident and non-resident investors, subject to meeting criteria prescribed by the regulatory authority.

Government's support to capital market for e-trading promotion

To encourage the general public towards investment in stocks by availing online facilities, Government of Pakistan has taken some initiatives to have maximum domestic as well as foreign investment in Pakistan's shares market. Listed below are some steps taken in this behalf:

(i) IPO: (Initial public offering) SECP has introduced the concept of e–IPO, i.e. electronic submission of subscription form, which enables the investors to make application for subscription of shares via internet.

(ii) Financial Literacy: The Lahore Stock Exchange is proactive in encouraging financial literacy in the South Asian nation. In 2014, the LSE commenced an online training competition for participants to be trained and familiarized with the stock market.

(iii) e-Dividend' service: Central Depository Company (CDC) of Pakistan Limited has introduced e-Dividend service for stock market. This service provides transfer of dividend warrant and bonus issue of certificates electronically which saves time and expenses, by crediting cash or certificate in the bank account or investors' account with his stock broker respectively.

(iv) Payment by Credit Cards: SECP has introduced in capital market payment of fee through credit cards with a view to promote the paperless environment towards its e-commerce regime. This facilitates stakeholders submit returns/forms online without visiting banks or affiliated offices of SECP

=== E-banking ===
Pakistan's e-banking landscape has experienced exponential growth, driven by regulatory support and new financial technology. According to the State Bank of Pakistan's annual review for Fiscal Year 2024, the volume of e-banking transactions has surged, with internet and mobile banking users now exceeding 40 million nationwide.

A key catalyst in this transformation has been the launch of Raast, Pakistan's instant payment system. This platform has enabled seamless, real-time fund transfers, significantly boosting peer-to-peer (P2P) and merchant payments across the country. Furthermore, the sector has been energized by the introduction of Electronic Money Institutions (EMIs) such as Nayapay and Sadapay. These app-based services have accelerated financial inclusion by simplifying the process of opening accounts and making digital payments, particularly among the youth.

== Online complaints ==
The Karachi Police of Sindh capital with its plan to facilitate the citizens of Karachi to register online complaints that can be converted into First Information Reports (FIR) is another step towards online applications for the benefits of Pakistani people. This move by Karachi Police is a replication of a similar project in Khyber Pakhtunkhwa. The FIR registration for recording citizens' grievances through the internet without visiting police stations is an initiative for other mega cities of the subcontinent.

=== Duplicate billing ===
In Pakistan one can now print or download a PDF copy of Electricity Bill or its Duplicate copy by entering customer/consumer Account Number allotted by the concerned Electric Supply Company, in addition to lodging online complaints against power failure/shut down or other matters affiliated with the relation between customer and power supplying company.

== See also ==
- Brokerage firm
- Electronic business
- Electronic trading platform
- Kaymu Pakistan
- Open outcry
