= PricePanda =

Shopping website

PricePanda Group GmbH
- Type: Private
- Industry: Internet services Comparison Shopping Distributed Content Commerce
- Founded: 2012
- Headquarters: Berlin, Germany (headquarters); Singapore
- Key people: Christian Schiller (co-founder); Louis Iskandar (co-founder); Philip Wegener (managing director)
- Website: www.pricepanda.com

PricePanda is a price comparison shopping website and distributed content store, founded in 2012 by Christian Schiller and Louis Iskandar in Berlin. The managing director is Philip Wegener.

== Operations ==
PricePanda operates in its markets by establishing business partnerships with merchants and retailers to provide information and price lists on a wide range of products. As of November 2014, the website's database holds over 50,000 products and 100,000 prices for users to compare. Its product categories include cameras, computers, televisions, video, audio, software, smartphones, entertainment, navigation, fashion, health and beauty. The site serves as the data source for price comparisons of shopping websites.

== History ==
PricePanda was launched in 2012. Today the business is present in nine countries in Southeast Asia, South Asia, and Latin America: Year 2012 – Singapore, Indonesia and Malaysia, Year 2013 – Mexico and Philippines Year 2014 – Colombia and Argentina, Thailand, and India. In January 2014 PricePanda had redirected 1 million users to partners’ shops since the company's launch in 2012.

== Mobile ==
PricePanda is also optimised for mobile: as of October 2014, 44% of total visitors come from smartphones and 9% - from tablets. In October 2013, the company launched its first mobile application for the Philippines, Malaysia, Singapore and Indonesia to enforce M-commerce in South East Asia. The app enables users to search for a product by its name and locate prices for thousands of products in order to find the best deals online and on the go. It also enables users to visit and contact merchants' and retailers' websites within the app. The mobile application is available on both iOS and Android (operating system).

== Investments ==
In January 2014 PricePanda raised $3 million in funding from the large German retailer Tengelmann Group. According to the company the new funding will be used to expand the business in several other markets worldwide.
