= Livestream shopping =

Live streaming with an aim to promote and sell a product

Livestream shopping (also known as live video shopping) is used by brands to promote and sell products through livestreams on digital platforms, often in collaboration with influencers.

The aim is to provide consumers with an immersive and interactive experience, allowing them to ask questions and buy products during the livestream.

It started in Asia in 2017 and then expanded to the rest of the world over the following years.

== Terminology & phenomenon ==
Live streaming is a type of streaming that allows content to be transmitted or received over the Internet while an event is taking place; in livestream shopping, the event is a live product presentation watched by consumers from different locations.

Livestream shopping consists of livestreams on digital platforms (e-commerce) or social media (Facebook, Instagram etc. ) in which an influencer promotes a product or a brand. While the influencer promotes, people can watch these livestreams and they can ask questions live, they can chat or buy products from the shop. In this way, the activity of shopping is translated from offline into the digital world.

The aim is to make sure that consumers get completely involved in the live sale that may take place on the other side of the world, without the necessity of being there physically.

Other terminology for the same phenomenon:

- shopstream;
- livestream e-commerce

== Shopping in contemporary society ==
=== Influencers and their contemporary role ===
The Internet has had a considerable impact in many spheres, including communication and consumerism and it is considered to be one of the most influential media and a key element in globalisation.

The arrival of social networks has changed the behaviour of consumers, connecting users and making them participate and active, prosumers, both consumers and content producers.

In this context the concept of e-marketing, or digital marketing, has made its way, that is applying the concepts of marketing through the internet technology. Kotler states that the electronic marketing is "the effort of the company to inform, advertise and sell products and services via the Internet". This new type of marketing allows to identify a more precise target, customizing the experience of each user making it more dynamic. Segmentation is a very useful tool for directly targeting consumers who, thanks to the Internet, are increasingly informed and therefore it becomes more difficult to attract them through traditional media.

Social media has transformed communication, allowing interaction and engagement between members of a community through messages, sharing photos and videos in real time and globally. This environment allows the consumer to create and share creative, informative and fun contents. The media therefore offers an opportunity for companies to reach new markets and new broad customer targets.

The concept of digital marketing gives rise to several subcategories, including influencer marketing. Celebrities have always been used to promote contents, increase brand awareness or brand perception. In influencer marketing, however, celebrities are chosen from the world of social media, which, thanks to their knowledge, skills or personality, can become online opinion leaders and thus influence directly or indirectly the decisions of consumers. "Influencer marketing is the virtue and the science of engaging people who have influence on the Internet to spread the message of a specific trend and its targeted audience in the form of sponsored content". Therefore, influencers can help to attract new potential consumers, create brand awareness and improve the brand image. Choosing influencers with the right persona and matching picture style is crucial. Whether the influencer can influence users, i.e., whether they have private domain traffic, they must have loyal fans. The anchor, the user, and the goods are based on the interaction of the scene and need to form a "field" following the established script-controlled plot, leading to many transactions.

Consumers tend to perceive the messages advertised by influencers as more reliable and convincing than conventional advertising, thus ensuring a higher economic return (ROI) for companies. In fact, influencer marketing is based on the confidence and trust of consumers acquired by the opinion leaders over time.

=== Pandemic boost ===
The COVID-19 pandemic and the consequent lockdowns had a significant impact on the use of social networks and consumption. The ephemeral content in particular was consumed more during the pandemic. This fact has been exploited by marketers to reach and connect to consumers, being the only way to communicate with them.

Brands have therefore tried and are trying to adapt to this decisive change. In China, since live commerce had a significant boost during the pandemic, consumers have found livestream shopping as an important interactive experience.

=== How it works versus a live shopping platform ===
Livestream shopping can take place in two broad technical arrangements. In the first, a brand or influencer broadcasts through the live video features already built into a social media or content app, using whatever chat, comment, and product-tagging tools that app makes available. Viewers watch the stream, ask questions or comment in a live chat feed, and are typically directed to a linked product page or external store to complete their purchase, sometimes leaving the stream to do so.

In the second arrangement, the broadcast runs on a dedicated live shopping platform: software built specifically to combine video streaming with commerce functions in a single interface. These platforms typically integrate the product catalog directly into the video player, so items being shown on screen appear as clickable tiles or an overlay, letting viewers add them to a cart or complete checkout without leaving the stream. They often include additional features tailored to selling, such as inventory counters that update in real time, automated alerts when a featured item sells out, saved payment details for one-click purchases, and analytics for the seller on viewer engagement and conversion. Some dedicated platforms also support formats like live auctions, where price or item availability changes dynamically as the broadcast progresses.

The core interactive elements, such as live host narration, real-time audience questions, and the sense of shopping alongside other viewers, are present in both arrangements. The distinction lies mainly in how seamlessly the purchase itself is completed: built-in social media livestreaming tends to treat commerce as an added layer on top of a content platform, while dedicated live shopping platforms are engineered around the transaction as the primary purpose of the stream.

=== Engagement strategies and industry practices ===
Brands hosting livestream shopping events rely on a range of interactive techniques to hold viewers' attention and encourage purchases. Surveys of brands running livestream shopping programs indicate that light and humorous conversation is the most widely used tactic, employed by 85% of surveyed brands to build rapport with viewers. Answering customer questions live during the broadcast is nearly as common, used by 80% of brands, reflecting the format's emphasis on real-time interaction between hosts and audiences. Contests and giveaways are incorporated by 78% of brands to boost viewer participation, while 51% include live product demonstrations, allowing potential customers to see items in use before purchasing.

Scheduling patterns also show consistency across the industry. Wednesday is the most common day for livestream shopping events, chosen by 41% of brands, suggesting a mid-week peak in broadcast activity. Evening broadcasts are similarly favored, with 76% of events typically going live around 7 p.m. In terms of format, most livestream shopping sessions run between 30 and 90 minutes in length.

== Value and volume ==
According to Alibaba, the largest online retailer in China, the sale worth from its live-streaming commerce business during the Single’s Day Shopping Festival hit ca.20-billion-yuan (ca. $3 million) in November 2019.

In 2020 the number of live streaming in China consumers reached 526 million. Moreover, the rivalry was not only among livestreaming ecommerces but also among influencers on social media (like TikTok).

Livestream shopping combines product presentations with real-time interaction. In 2023, China had 597 million users of e-commerce livestreaming.

== See also ==
- Online shopping
- Livestreaming
- Internet television
- Digital marketing
- E-commerce
