= E-commerce in Mexico =

The e-commerce market in Mexico in 2015 was estimated by Forbes to be 12 billion U.S. dollars and by the Mexican Internet Association AMIPCI to be 257.1 billion Mexico pesos (about 15.6 billion U.S. dollars). This represented 1.6–2% of all retail sales vs. a global average of 7%.

== Characteristics of the market ==
E-commerce in Mexico takes place primarily through the use of websites and apps, but it can also be conducted through messaging platforms such as WhatsApp, Facebook Messenger (sometimes using chatbots), and leads generated on social media.

According to estimates in 2016, around 70% of Mexicans had access to the internet. E-commerce volume in Mexico grew by 900% between 2009 and 2015.

While debit and credit cards are commonly used for e-commerce payments in Mexico, cash is also an important payment method. Nearly half of Mexicans have used cash to make an e-commerce purchase. Transactions are completed online, and the website provides a reference number. Customers must then bring this reference number and the cash to a convenience store, supermarket, or bank that accepts cash payments and charges a commission.

== Associations ==
Organizations include the Asociación de Internet.mx (formerly AMIPCI), and AMVO (Asociación Mexicana de la Venta Online) which organizes the annual HotSale, a sale on e-commerce channels only across a broad range of Mexican retailers.

== By industry ==
=== Retailers ===
Leaders in clothes retailing include Liverpool, MercadoLibre and Privalia. Only grocery retailing is led by Walmart, Superama and Soriana. Leaders in electronics are MercadoLibre, Amazon Mexico and Linio, the latter originally launched by Rocket Internet. Leaders in Home Improvement include The Home Depot.

=== Delivery ===
Rappi, Cornershop and Mercadoni deliver groceries from various retailers (in some cases competing with the retailers' own delivery services), while Sin Delantal and Uber Eats deliver food from restaurants.

=== Transportation ===
Uber and Cabify compete for the taxi and car share business, while the four largest Mexican airlines Aeroméxico, Volaris, Interjet and Viva Aerobús all have an important e-commerce and social media presence. Aeroméxico in particular publicized its digital transformation as a key pillar of its strategy, and has expanded its sales and service to a chatbot on Facebook Messenger.

=== Entertainment ===
Netflix and Claro Video and Blim compete in offering streaming entertainment to Mexican households. while Spotify dominates in streaming music.

== Startups ==
Startup incubators/accelerators such as MassChallenge and Plug and Play are present with Mexican programs and WeWork and local alternatives provide office space. Many corporates have innovation programs including Nestlé, Scotiabank and Aeroméxico. INADEM, Instituto Nacional para el Emprendedor (National Institute for the Entrepreneur), part of the Economics Ministry, provides support to startups.
