= Viya (influencer) =

Chinese live streaming influencer, singer and entrepreneur

Huang Wei (Chinese: 黄薇; pinyin: Huáng Wēi, born 7 September 1985), commonly known by her stage name Viya (Chinese: 薇娅; pinyin: Wēiyà) is a Chinese social media personality known for using livestreams on Taobao Live to sell various items as a form of influencer marketing. Her prowess at selling items, including many high-priced ones, has gained her the moniker "queen of livestreaming". In December 2021, she was fined $210 million for tax evasion as part of a greater crackdown on entertainers and investors, the biggest fine for a livestreamer in China.

== Career ==
Being born in a retailer family in Anhui province, Huang opened her first store, located in Beijing, at the age of 18 and worked in the "front" selling apparel and modeling while her boyfriend (now husband) Dong Haifeng took care of back-end and inventory operations. She performed on Anhui TV's talent show "Super Idol" and became a member of a music group for some time before going back to the shopping business and opening more stores in Xi'an. By 2012, though, they migrated from brick-and-mortar to e-commerce and signed up for Taobao's livestreaming program in 2016 as one of the first channels. On Taobao, she gained a reputation for being able to sell any product or service, with news that she had sold a rocket launch service for CN¥40m ($6m) in 2020 sold over CN¥8.5b ($1.3 billion) of inventory on Singles' Day in 2021, which led to her being dubbed the "queen of livestreaming".

In December 2021, as part of a broader crackdown on Internet celebrities and entertainment personalities in China, she was fined 1.34 billion yuan ($210 million) for misreported income in 2019 and 2020 that led to an underpayment of 640 million yuan ($100 million) in taxes, the biggest fine given to a livestreamer in the country, and her social media accounts were taken down.
