= Mogujie =

Chinese social media and e-commerce platform

MOGU INC （蘑菇街）
- Type: Public company
- Industry: Fashion
- Founded: 2011 in Hangzhou, China
- Founders: Chen Qi (陈琪); Yue Xuqiang (岳旭强); Wei Yibo 魏一搏
- Headquarters: Hangzhou, China
- Key people: Chen Qi (陈琪), Chairman, CEO
- Number of employees: 1000
- Website: mogu-inc.com

MOGU INC (Chinese: 蘑菇街) is a China-based social media and e-commerce platform specializing in fashion content, products, and services.

Headquartered in Hangzhou, China, Mogu was founded in 2011 by former Alibaba engineer Chen Qi, along with Xue Yuqiang and Wei Yibo. The three co-founders now serve as the company's Chairman and CEO, COO, and Director, respectively. It employs a workforce of approximately 1000 people.

As of September 30, 2018, the monthly active mobile users on the Mogu platform were 62.6 million, consisting primarily of young women between the ages of 15 and 30, residing in the People's Republic of China.

The Mogu platform features live broadcasts, short videos, photos, reviews, and articles generated by users, professional fashion influencers, and Mogu's in-house editorial team.

== Structure ==
=== "Trilateral Network" ===
A key differentiator of the Mogu platform is the construction of a "trilateral network." The network closely integrates fashion influencers, brands and merchants, and users, fostering a content and e-commerce environment which benefits all three parties.

=== Consumer-to-Factory (C2F) Model ===
Mogu's "trilateral network" of users, influencers, and merchants allow for what the company claims are a number or increased efficiencies for merchants and manufacturers. Among them are reduced intermediaries, lower inventory risk, shorter design-to-retail time, and more collections per year.

This is enabled in large part through the platform's live broadcast feature, as helps merchants determine how popular a design is in real time. As chairman and CEO Chen Qi was quoted as saying in a TechCrunch article, "The manufacturers won't even have to make the clothes upfront. Our live broadcast host will show a sample to her audience, aggregate orders, and tell the factory how many to make and in what sizes... ...This significantly speeds up the production process and lowers prices for consumers."

Mogu is regarded as a top destination for China's popular live streaming industry, cited by Mary Meeker of Kleiner Perkins Caufield & Byers in her 2017 annual rapid-fire internet trends report.

=== Revenues ===
On August 24, 2020, Mogu Inc released an unaudited first-quarter financial reportfor financial year 2021. The revenue of Mogu Inc is ¥3.12 billion CNY, with yoy rate of -25.2%. The GMV of LVB business is ¥2.266 billion CNY, accounts for 72.6% of total GMV.

== History and ownership ==
In January 2016, Mogu acquired rival fashion platform Meilishuo. The merger formed a business that was at that time valued at an estimated $3 billion.

Mogu Inc went public on the NYSE on December 6, 2018, under the ticker symbol MOGU. 4,750,000 shares were offered at a price of $14 per share, raising a total of US$66.5 million.

After the IPO, Chen Qi directly held shares of 11.3%, with 79.3% of the firm's voting rights; co-founder Yue Xuqiang held 3% of shares, with 0.7% voting rights, with Wei Yibo holding 4% of shares and 0.9% voting rights.

Tencent is Mogu's largest shareholder, holding 17.2% and having 4% voting rights. Hillhouse Capital Group holds 9.8% and has 2.3% voting rights.
