= Cash on delivery =

Method of package delivery where payment is made upon receipt

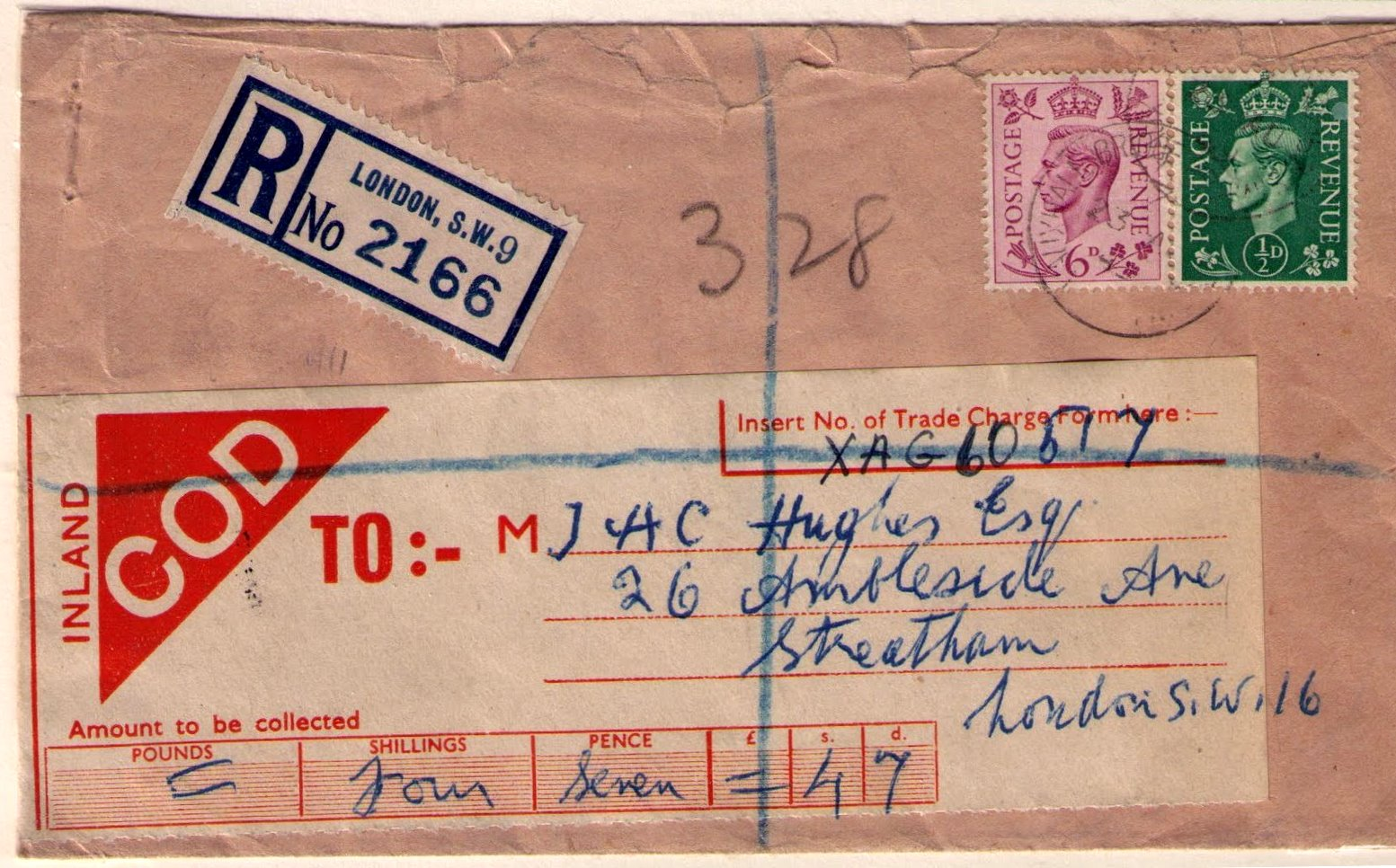
A British cash on delivery registered letter from 1940s London showing 4s 7d due on delivery.

Cash on delivery (COD), sometimes called payment on delivery, cash on demand, payment on demand or collect on delivery is the sale of goods by mail order where payment is made on delivery rather than in advance. If the goods are not paid for, they are returned to the retailer. The term originally applied only to payment by cash, but as other forms of payment have become more common, the word "cash" has sometimes been replaced with the word "collect" to include transactions by checks, money orders, credit cards or debit cards.

== Advantages and disadvantages for retailers ==
Advantages of COD for online or mail order retailers:

- The customer does not need to own a credit card to purchase.
- Impulse purchases may increase as payment is not due at the time of ordering.
- The credibility of retailers may be increased because the consumer only has to pay when the item is delivered.

Disadvantages of COD for online or mail order retailers:

- Orders might be returned as buyers are less committed to the purchase than if they had paid in advance (which led to the eventual elimination of C.O.D. with many TV offers in the United States and Canada by the early 1980s).
- Logistics partners charge additional fees for COD orders.

== Limits ==
Most operators impose a limit on the amount of money that can be collected per delivery or per day using COD services. Limits may be higher for non-cash payments. Canada Post, for instance, applies a limit of C$1,000 for cash, but C$5,000 for payment by check or money order.

== Popularity in the developing world ==
COD remains a popular option with internet-based retailers in some countries, since it is far easier to set up for small businesses and does not require the purchaser to have a credit card. Many small businesses prefer cash payments over credit card payments and offer discounts if paid in cash, as it avoids credit card processing fees.

COD is a widely used model in India. The overwhelming majority of e-shopping transactions in the Middle East are COD. Sixty percent of online transactions in the UAE and Middle East are done by cash on delivery and this has also led to the growth of courier companies offering a COD service.

== See also ==
- Avis de réception
- Parcel post
- Wrapper
