= 2015 =

2015 in various calendars
- Gregorian calendar: 2015; MMXV
- Ab urbe condita: 2768
- Armenian calendar: 1464; ԹՎ ՌՆԿԴ
- Assyrian calendar: 6765
- Baháʼí calendar: 171–172
- Balinese saka calendar: 1936–1937
- Bengali calendar: 1421–1422
- Berber calendar: 2965
- British Regnal year: 63 Eliz. 2 – 64 Eliz. 2
- Buddhist calendar: 2559
- Burmese calendar: 1377
- Byzantine calendar: 7523–7524
- Chinese calendar: 甲午年 (Wood Horse); 4712 or 4505 — to — 乙未年 (Wood Goat); 4713 or 4506
- Coptic calendar: 1731–1732
- Discordian calendar: 3181
- Ethiopian calendar: 2007–2008
- Hebrew calendar: 5775–5776
- Hindu calendars
- Vikram Samvat: 2071–2072
- Shaka Samvat: 1936–1937
- Kali Yuga: 5115–5116
- Holocene calendar: 12015
- Igbo calendar: 1015–1016
- Iranian calendar: 1393–1394
- Islamic calendar: 1436–1437
- Japanese calendar: Heisei 27 (平成２７年)
- Javanese calendar: 1948–1949
- Juche calendar: 104
- Julian calendar: Gregorian minus 13 days
- Korean calendar: 4348
- Minguo calendar: ROC 104 民國104年
- Nanakshahi calendar: 547
- Thai solar calendar: 2558
- Tibetan calendar: ཤིང་ཕོ་རྟ་ལོ་ (male Wood-Horse); 2141 or 1760 or 988 — to — ཤིང་མོ་ལུག་ལོ་ (female Wood-Sheep); 2142 or 1761 or 989
- Unix time: 1420070400 – 1451606399

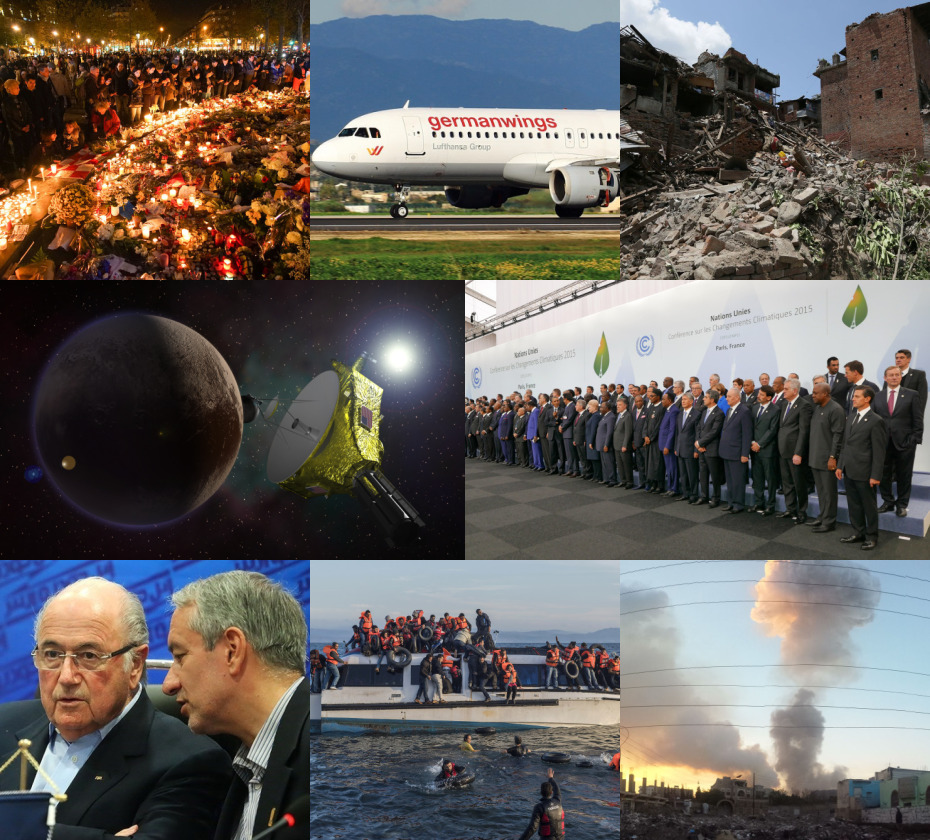
Clockwise from top-left: Civil service in remembrance of the November Paris attacks; Germanwings Flight 9525 was purposely crashed into the French Alps by co-pilot Andreas Lubitz, killing all 150 people on board; The Gorkha earthquake in Nepal kills 8,964 people; World leaders pose for a picture during COP21, which would lead to the Paris Agreement the following year; An airstrike in Sanaa during the Saudi-led intervention in the Yemen civil war; Refugees of the Syrian civil war come ashore in Greece amidst a migrant crisis in Europe; FIFA president Sepp Blatter is forced to resign in the wake of a corruption case; New Horizons makes a flyby and takes the first images of Pluto.

2015 (MMXV) was a common year starting on Thursday of the Gregorian calendar, the 2015th year of the Common Era (CE) and Anno Domini (AD) designations, the 15th year of the 3rd millennium and the 21st century, and the 6th year of the 2010s decade.

2015 was designated by the United Nations as:

- International Year of Light
- International Year of Soil

== Events ==
=== January ===
- January 1 – Lithuania officially adopts the euro as its currency, replacing the litas, and becomes the 19th Eurozone country.
- January 3–7 – A series of massacres in Baga, Nigeria and surrounding villages by Boko Haram kills more than 2,000 people.
- January 7 – Two gunmen belonging to Al-Qaeda's Yemen branch kill 12 people and injure 11 more at the Paris headquarters of satirical newspaper Charlie Hebdo, prompting an anti-terrorism demonstration attended by over a million people and more than 40 world leaders.
- January 12 – A Boko Haram and Islamic State assault on Kolofata in the Far North Region of Cameroon is repelled by the Cameroonian Army, who kill 143 Boko Haram and Islamic State insurgents.
- January 15 – The Swiss National Bank abandons the cap on the franc's value relative to the euro, causing turmoil in international financial markets.
- January 22 – After Houthi forces seize the presidential palace, Yemeni President Abd Rabbuh Mansur Hadi resigns after months of unrest.
- January 25 – Legislative elections are held in Greece to elect all 300 members of the Hellenic Parliament and the SYRIZA party, led by Alexis Tsipras, comes out as the largest party winning 149 out of 300 seats.

=== February ===
- February 12
  - Leaders from Russian Federation, Ukraine, Germany and French Republic reach an agreement on the war in eastern Ukraine that includes a ceasefire and withdrawal of heavy weapons. However, several days later, the Ukrainian government and pro-Russian rebels claim that, within its first day, the ceasefire was broken 139 times, as both sides failed to withdraw their heavy weapons and fighting had continued.
  - The United Nations Security Council adopts Resolution 2199 to combat terrorism.
- February 14–15 – A lone gunman leaves 2 people dead in a terrorist attack in Copenhagen, Denmark.
- February 14–March 29 – The 2015 Cricket World Cup is held in Australia and New Zealand with Australia defeating New Zealand in the final.
- February 16 – The Egyptian military begins conducting airstrikes against a branch of the Islamic militant group ISIL in Libya in retaliation for the group's beheading of over a dozen Egyptian Christians.

=== March ===
- March 5–8 – The ancient city sites of Nimrud, Hatra and Dur-Sharrukin in Iraq are demolished by the Islamic State of Iraq and the Levant.
- March 6 – NASA's Dawn probe enters orbit around Ceres, becoming the first spacecraft to visit a dwarf planet.
- March 12 – The Islamic State of Iraq and the Levant becomes allies with fellow jihadist group Boko Haram, effectively annexing the group.
- March 20 – A total solar eclipse is visible in the north Atlantic, Faroe Islands, and Svalbard. It is the 61st eclipse of the 120th saros cycle.
- March 24 – An Airbus A320-211 operated by Germanwings is deliberately crashed by First officer Andres Lubitz in the French Alps, killing all 150 people on board.
- March 25
  - A Saudi Arabia-led coalition of Arab countries starts a military intervention in Yemen in order to uphold the Yemeni government in its fight against the Houthis' southern offensive.
  - The BBC refuses to renew the contract of Top Gear's main presenter, Jeremy Clarkson, resulting in the end of his run on the 2002-format show.
- March 26 – The order of succession to the British throne is changed to absolute primogeniture, in accordance with the 2011 Perth Agreement and the UK Succession to the Crown Act 2013. The change also applies in the Commonwealth realms. Marrying a Roman Catholic no longer disqualifies a person from succeeding to the Crown.
- March 29 – Australia wins the 2015 Cricket World Cup.

=== April ===
- April 2 – 148 people are killed, the majority students, in a mass shooting at the Garissa University College in Kenya, perpetrated by the militant terrorist organization al-Shabaab.
- April 4 – The April 2015 lunar eclipse is visible in Asia, Australia, Pacific and the Americas. It is a shallow total lunar eclipse, with 0.08% of that diameter inside of Earth's umbral shadow, and is the 30th eclipse of the 132nd saros cycle.
- April 25 – A magnitude 7.8 earthquake strikes Nepal and causes 8,857 deaths in Nepal (including 19 at Everest base camp), 130 in India, 27 in China and 4 in Bangladesh with a total of 9,018 deaths.
- April 29 – The World Health Organization (WHO) declares that rubella has been eradicated from the Americas.

=== May ===
- May 1–October 31 – Expo 2015 is held in Milan, Italy.
- May 7 – The 2015 UK General Election results in the first Conservative majority government in 18 years.
- May 8 – The 2015 Al Khalis prison break occurs in the Iraqi town of Al Khalis, resulting in over fifty escapees.
- May 10 – The first round of the 2015 Polish presidential election is held.
- May 11–12 – Version O of Les Femmes d'Alger by Pablo Picasso sells for US$179.3 million at Christie's auction in New York, while the sculpture L'Homme au doigt by Alberto Giacometti sells for US$141.3 million, setting a new world record for a painting and for a sculpture, respectively.
- May 12 – A second major earthquake in Nepal, measuring 7.3 on the moment magnitude scale, results in 153 deaths in Nepal, 62 in India, 1 in China and 2 in Bangladesh, with a total of 218 deaths.
- May 19–23 – The Eurovision Song Contest 2015 is held in Vienna, Austria, and is won by Swedish entrant Måns Zelmerlöw with the song "Heroes".
- May 21 – ISIS captures the ancient city of Palmyra in Syria.
- May 24 – The second round of the 2015 Polish presidential election is held, with Andrzej Duda reigning victorious over then-incumbent president Bronisław Komorowski.

=== June ===
- June 2 – The FIFA President Sepp Blatter announces his intention to resign amidst an FBI-led corruption investigation, and calls for an extraordinary congress to elect a new president as soon as possible.
- June 6 – The governments of India and Bangladesh officially ratify their 1974 agreement to exchange enclaves along their border.
- June 12–28 – The inaugural European Games are held in Baku, Azerbaijan.
- June 18 – Pope Francis releases the encyclical letter Laudato si', dated May 24, 2015.
- June 25–26 – ISIL claim responsibility for three attacks around the world during Ramadan:
  - Kobanî massacre: ISIL fighters detonate three car bombs, enter Kobanî, Syria, and open fire at civilians, killing more than 220 people.
  - Sousse attacks: 22-year-old Seifeddine Rezgui opens fire at a tourist resort at Port El Kantaoui, Tunisia, killing 38 people.
  - Kuwait mosque bombing: A suicide bomber attacks the Shia Mosque Imam Ja'far as-Sadiq at Kuwait City, Kuwait, killing 27 people and injuring 227 others.
- June 30
  - Cuba becomes the first country in the world to eradicate mother-to-child transmission of HIV and syphilis.
  - An extra leap second (23:59:60) is added to end of June. The last time this occurred was in 2012.

=== July ===
- July 1 – Greek government-debt crisis: Greece becomes the first advanced economy to miss a payment to the International Monetary Fund in the 71-year history of the IMF.
- July 5–13 – Greek government-debt crisis: After six months of clashes and futile negotiations between Greece's newly elected, leftist government and the country's creditors, over the austerity measures imposed through bailout programmes, tension peaks as Greece votes in a referendum to reject the terms offered in a third programme; however, the government eventually proceeds to concur to harsher terms than those offered before, in what was widely characterized as a coup on the creditors' part.
- July 11 – Nintendo's president and CEO Satoru Iwata dies.
- July 14
  - NASA's New Horizons spacecraft performs a close flyby of Pluto, becoming the first spacecraft in history to visit the distant world.
  - Iranian nuclear deal: Iran agrees to long-term limits of its nuclear program in exchange for sanctions relief.
- July 20 – Cuba and the United States end 54 years of hostility between the nations, reestablish full diplomatic relations.
- July 24 – Turkey begins a series of airstrikes against PKK and ISIL targets after the 2015 Suruç bombing.
- July 29 – Microsoft releases the desktop operating system Windows 10.
- July 31 – The International Olympic Committee awards Beijing the right to host the 2022 Winter Olympics.

=== August ===
- August 1 – 161 exclaves of Bangladesh within India or vice versa are ceded to the country that contained them.
- August 5 – Debris found on Réunion Island is confirmed to be that of Malaysia Airlines Flight 370, missing since March 2014.
- August 12 and 15 – Large explosions in Tianjin, China kill 173 and injure more than 800 people. The causes of the explosions were found to be an overheated container of dry nitrocellulose and around 800 tonnes of ammonium nitrate.
- August 17 – A bombing takes place inside the Erawan Shrine at the Ratchaprasong intersection in Pathum Wan District, Bangkok, Thailand, killing 20 people and injuring 125.
- August 23 – A UAE military intelligence operation in the country of Yemen frees one British hostage.

=== September ===
- September 9 – Queen Elizabeth II, having been on the throne for 63 years, 217 days, becomes the longest-reigning British monarch in history and the longest-serving head of state of any nation in modern history, surpassing Queen Victoria who had reigned for 63 years, 216 days upon her death on January 22, 1901.
- September 10 – Scientists announce the discovery of Homo naledi, a previously unknown species of early human in South Africa.
- September 13 – A partial solar eclipse is visible in southern Africa, the southern Indian Ocean, and Antarctica. It is the 54th eclipse of Saros cycle 125.
- September 14
  - First observation of gravitational waves: Gravitational waves are detected for the first time, by LIGO. This is not announced until February 11, 2016.
  - Malcolm Turnbull defeats Tony Abbott in a Liberal Party leadership ballot. Turnbull becomes Prime Minister of Australia, being sworn in the following day.
- September 16 – An 8.4 earthquake strikes 46 km from Coquimbo (in Chile). 22 people are killed and 34 more injured.
- September 18–October 31 – The 2015 Rugby World Cup is held in England and is won by New Zealand who beat Australia in the final.
- September 18 – Automaker Volkswagen is alleged to have been involved in worldwide rigging of diesel emissions tests, affecting an estimated 11 million vehicles globally.
- September 20 – Snap legislative elections are held in Greece, following the resignation of prime minister Alexis Tsipras, to elect all 300 members of the Hellenic Parliament and the SYRIZA party, led by Alexis Tsipras comes out as the largest party winning 145 out of 300 seats.
- September 24 – A crush during the Hajj pilgrimage in Mecca kills at least 2,200 people and injures more than 900 others, with more than 650 missing.
- September 28 – NASA announces that liquid water has been found on Mars.
- September 30 – Russia begins air strikes against ISIL and anti-government forces in Syria, in support of the Syrian government.

=== October ===
- October 3 – A United States airstrike on a Médecins Sans Frontières (Doctors Without Borders) hospital in Afghanistan kills an estimated 20 people.
- October 10 – A series of suicide bombings kills at least 100 people at a peace rally in Ankara, Turkey, and injures more than 400 others.
- October 22 – The Trollhättan school attack takes place at Kronan School in Trollhättan, Sweden. A 21-year-old attacker killed three people, including two school staff members and one student, and injured two others. The attacker was shot by police and later died in hospital.
- October 23 – Hurricane Patricia becomes the most intense hurricane ever recorded in the Western Hemisphere and the second strongest worldwide, with winds of 215 mph and a pressure of 872 mbar.
- October 25 – The 2015 Polish parliamentary election is held for the Sejm of the Republic of Poland, with the election being won by the largest opposition party, the right-wing Law and Justice (PiS).
- October 26 – A magnitude 7.5 earthquake strikes the Hindu Kush region and causes 398 deaths, with 279 in Pakistan, 115 in Afghanistan and 4 in India.
- October 30 – Colectiv nightclub fire: a fire ignited by a failed fireworks show sets the walls and columns covered in foam of the Colectiv nightclub, located in Romania's capital Bucharest. 27 people die at the scene, including four out the five members of the Romanian metalcore band "Goodbye to Gravity", and 37 would succumb later due to the injuries and intoxication with fumes, but also because of the poor treatment conditions. The event and the poor management of the situation spark a riot in all of Romania, known as the "Colectiv Revolution".
- October 31 – Metrojet Flight 9268, an Airbus A321 airliner en route to Saint Petersburg from Sharm el-Sheikh, crashes near Al-Hasana in Sinai, killing all 217 passengers and 7 crew members on board. Later investigations revealed a bomb was likely responsible for the crash with Islamic State being the primary suspect.

=== November ===
- November 4 – Romanian prime-minister Victor Ponta resigns amid calls from the people angered by the Colectiv nightclub fire, marking the end of an almost four years period of unrest in Romania. Peaceful protests would continue until November 9.
- November 5 – In Mariana, Minas Gerais, Brazil, a tailings dam of iron ore collapses, causing 19 deaths and releasing a toxic mudflow to pollute the Doce River.
- November 7 – CCP general secretary Xi Jinping and ROC president Ma Ying-jeou formally meet for the first time.
- November 12 – 2015 Beirut bombings: Two suicide bombers detonate explosives in Bourj el-Barajneh, Beirut, killing 43 people and injuring over 200 others.
- November 13
  - Multiple terrorist attacks claimed by Islamic State of Iraq and the Levant (ISIL) in Paris, France, result in 130 fatalities.
  - The United States begins airstrikes in Libya.
- November 24 – Turkey shoots down a Russian fighter jet on the Turkish–Syrian border in the first case of a NATO member destroying a Russian aircraft since the 1950s.
- November 30 – The 2015 United Nations Climate Change Conference (COP 21) is held in Paris, attended by leaders from 147 nations.

=== December ===
- December 2 – Two gunmen open fire at a workplace in San Bernardino, California, killing 14 before dying themselves in a shootout with police. ISIL claimed responsibility.
- December 11 – OpenAI, a non-profit artificial intelligence research company, is founded.
- December 12 – A global climate change pact is agreed at the COP 21 summit in Paris, committing all countries to reduce carbon emissions for the first time.
- December 15 – The Islamic Military Counter Terrorism Coalition is formed in order to fight terrorism.
- December 22 – SpaceX lands an uncrewed Falcon 9 rocket, the first reusable rocket to successfully enter orbital space and return.

== Nobel Prizes ==
Nobel medal

- Chemistry – Paul L. Modrich; Aziz Sancar and Tomas Lindahl
- Economics – Angus Deaton
- Literature – Svetlana Alexievich
- Peace – Tunisian National Dialogue Quartet
- Physics – Takaaki Kajita and Arthur B. McDonald
- Physiology or Medicine – William C. Campbell, Satoshi Ōmura and Tu Youyou

== New English words ==
- aphantasia
- aquafaba
- cloud kitchen
- extreme risk protection order
- ghost kitchen
- red flag law

== See also ==
- 2010s in political history
- List of international years
