= Grande tête mince =

1955 sculpture by Alberto Giacometti

- Large thin head (English)
- The sculpture is shown pictured from the front (left) and from the side (right)
- Artist: Alberto Giacometti
- Year: 1955
- Type: Bronze
- Dimensions: 67 cm (25 1/2 in)
- Owner: Anonymous bidder

Grande tête mince is a bronze sculpture by Alberto Giacometti. The work was conceived in 1954 and cast the following year. Auctioned in 2010, Grande tête mince became one of the most valuable sculptures ever sold when it fetched $53.3 million.

== Description ==
Grande tête mince [ɡʁɑ̃d tɛt mɛ̃s], translated as "Large thin head", has alternatively been known as Grande tête ("Large head"), Grande tête tranchante ("Large sharp head"), and Grande tête de Diego ("Large head of Diego"). The bronze sculpture is modelled on Giacometti or his brother Diego and stands at 25 1/2 inch (65 cm), making it one of the largest of his works. On the front it is signed and numbered "Alberto Giacometti 3/6" and the foundry mark "Susse Fondeur" is inscribed on the back. The sculpture is one of a mid-1950s series male busts by Giacometti, who began the piece in 1954 and cast it in early 1955.

The dimensions of the work are unusual, distorting the proportions to make the head tall and thin:

When viewed from different vantage points, Large Head of Diego seems to be two distinct heads. From the front the head is narrow; the effect is like looking straight on at a knife edge. From the side the profile is full-bodied and dramatically silhouetted, completely contradicting the frontal view.

— Valerie Fletcher, Alberto Giacometti: 1901-1966 p.180

== Auctions ==
In 2010, Grande tête mince had an estimated value of $25–$35 million. It was easily surpassed when an anonymous bidder paid $53,282,500 for the sculpture, one of the highest prices ever achieved. Just three months earlier Giacometti's L'Homme qui marche I had been auctioned by Sotheby's for $104.3 million, by far the highest sale price for a sculpture and at the time the most valuable work of art. Picasso's Nude, Green Leaves and Bust, sold as part of the same collection as Grande tête mince, broke that record to become the most expensive work of art ever to be sold at auction.

For a time Grande tête mince was the property of the Pierre Matisse Gallery in New York, before being sold to Sidney and Frances Brody on 19 May 1955. Sidney Brody died in 1983 and Frances retained the work until her death in November 2009. Christie's won the rights to auction 27 of their works of art, selling them under the title "Property from the Collection of Mrs. Sidney F. Brody" on 4 May 2010. Included in the collection were several highly valuable works, including Giacometti's Le Chat and paintings and sculptures by renowned artists Picasso, Moore, Modigliani, Degas, Renoir, and Matisse.

In 2025, Grande tête mince was put up for auction again, this time by the Soloviev Foundation (a nonprofit established by Sheldon Solow, who had owned the sculpture). The pre-sale estimate price of the sculpture was $70 million. At the request of the Soloviev Foundation, there was no minimum price guarantee, which was considered atypical for artwork sold at Sotheby's. Bidding opened at $59 million to no bids, and the piece went unsold. Experts stated that the original estimate was an "original sin" and stated that no person would reasonably buy the sculpture for such a significant markup so recently after it had last sold. Museums, art collectors, and art shows stated that the failure of Grande tête mince to sell was an indicator of weak economic conditions in the art market.

== See also ==
- List of most expensive sculptures
