= Guennol Stargazer =

Marble idol

- Location: Private collection

The Guennol Stargazer is a nine-inch, 5,000-year-old marble idol from Anatolia.

The statue depicts a nude human figure, referred to as a "stargazer" as the figure appears to look upward. Approximately fifteen intact stargazer statues exist, along with fragments of other stargazer figures. Like other stargazer figures, Guennol Stargazer has a mark on its neck indicating it may have been ritually "killed" before it was buried.

When placed for auction in New York in 2017, the Turkish government sued, claiming it had been illegally exported. By 2023 this claim seemed to have failed.

== History ==
The sculpture was possibly produced between 4800 and 4100 BCE in what is today Manisa Province in Turkey, although Christie's dated it about a thousand years later. The piece was in the collection of Alastair and Edith Martin. The couple purchased the piece from an art dealer, J.J. Klejman, in 1961. How Klejman came to own the sculpture has not been established. Klejman was referred to by former director of the Metropolitan Museum of Art, Thomas Hoving, as one of his "favorite dealer-smugglers". Klejman was implicated in the museum's purchase of the Lydian Hoard, which the museum acquired despite awareness that the artifacts were stolen.

Ownership of the sculpture eventually passed from the Martins to their son, Robin Martin, and later to a gallery. Michael Steinhardt, an American hedge fund manager, purchased the idol for $1.5 million in 1993. The figure was displayed at the Metropolitan Museum of Art, on loan, at times between 1966 and 1993, and was exhibited in the museum again from 1999 to 2007.

=== Repatriation dispute ===
The Guennol Stargazer was placed for sale at auction by its owner, Michael Steinhardt, at Christie's in 2017. Despite attempts to halt the sale by the Turkish government, including the filing of a suit in the U.S. District Court for the Southern District of New York against Steinhardt and Christie's, the auction occurred, and the sculpture sold for $14.4 million. The buyer then rescinded their offer, and Christie's placed the statue in storage in a vault operated by the auction house.

In 2021, U.S. District Judge Alison Nathan presided over a bench trial, Republic of Turkey v. Christie’s, Inc., concerning the dispute over the ownership of the Guennol Stargazer. Nathan rejected Turkey's ownership claim, which had been made pursuant to a 1906 Ottoman decree concerning the ownership of antiquities excavated in Turkey. Nathan found that Turkey had failed to show, by a preponderance of the evidence, that the Guennol Stargazer, which had been exhibited in the United States for decades, had been excavated after 1906. Nathan also held that Turkey's claim was in any case barred by laches, since it had waited too long to pursue its claim. This ruling was later upheld by Rosemary S. Pooler of the United States Court of Appeals for the Second Circuit in March 2023.

== See also ==
- Guennol Lioness
