= Artemis and the Stag =

Bronze sculpture

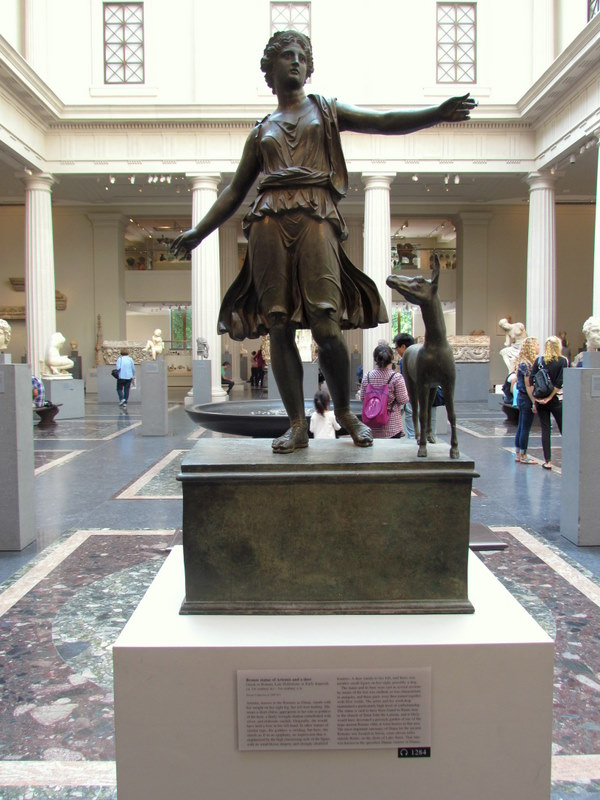
- On display at the Metropolitan Museum of Art
- Artist: Not known
- Year: 1st century BC – 1st century AD
- Type: Bronze
- Dimensions: 123.8 cm (48 3/4 in)
- Owner: Anonymous bidder

Artemis and the Stag is an early Roman Imperial or Hellenistic bronze sculpture of the ancient Greek goddess Artemis. In June 2007 the Albright-Knox Art Gallery placed the statue into auction; it fetched $28.6 million, the highest sale price of any sculpture at the time.

== Description ==
The statue depicts Artemis, the Greek goddess of hunting and wild animals amongst other things. She stands on a simple plinth in a pose that suggests she has just released an arrow from her bow. At some point in its history, the bow was separated from the sculpture and was lost. The goddess's hair is wavy and parted, gathered at the back in a chignon. She wears a short chiton that folds at the waist and billows outwards and is partly covered by a himation. On her feet are laced sandals, and a stag stands alongside her. It is thought that the original sculpture may have included a jumping dog to the right of the goddess.

Artemis stands at 36 1/4 inches atop a base of 12 1/2 inches. The stag is 16 3/4 inches. The sculpture is made of bronze and is believed to have been made some time between the 1st century BC and the 1st century AD. It was originally excavated in the 1920s from a construction site in Rome and has since changed hands several times before finding a home at the Albright-Knox Art Gallery in Buffalo, New York.

The sculpture has been described as "one of the most beautiful works of art surviving from the classical era". It is highly regarded for its excellent state of preservation, despite the missing bow, and its fine detail, particularly in the face of Artemis.

== Deaccessioning from the Albright-Knox Gallery ==
In November 2006, the Albright-Knox Gallery announced its intention to deaccession Artemis and the Stag from its collection. The statue was much-beloved by the public and had been part of the permanent collection since 1953. Director Louis Grachos defined Artemis and the Stag along with about 200 other works of art from the museum's permanent collection as falling outside the institution's historical "core mission" of "acquiring and exhibiting art of the present." The decision to deaccession was made by a vote of the museum's Board of Directors, was voted on and ratified by the entire membership (at a meeting forced by opponents of the sale), and followed the guidelines of the American Alliance of Museums, according to Albright-Knox officials. Nevertheless, announcement of the sale set off a firestorm of dissent.

The sale raised questions about how museums can remain vital when they are situated in economically declining regions and have limited means for raising funds for operations and acquisitions.

== Auction ==
The sculpture was auctioned at Sotheby's New York by Hugh Hildesley on 7 June 2007. Estimated to reach between $5 and $7 million, Artemis and the Stag broke records when it was sold for $28.6 million. It became the most valuable sculpture ever sold at auction, breaking the 2005 record of $27.4 million for Constantin Brâncuși's Bird in Space. The sale price has since been surpassed by several modern works, but the only other sculpture from antiquity to fetch a higher price is the Guennol Lioness. The winning bidder remained anonymous, employing art dealer Giuseppe Eskenazi to complete the auction.

In January 2008 the sculpture was initially lent to the Metropolitan Museum of Art for six months, and it remains on display there as of November 2026.

== See also ==
- List of most expensive sculptures
