= Maman (sculpture) =

Sculpture by Louise Bourgeois

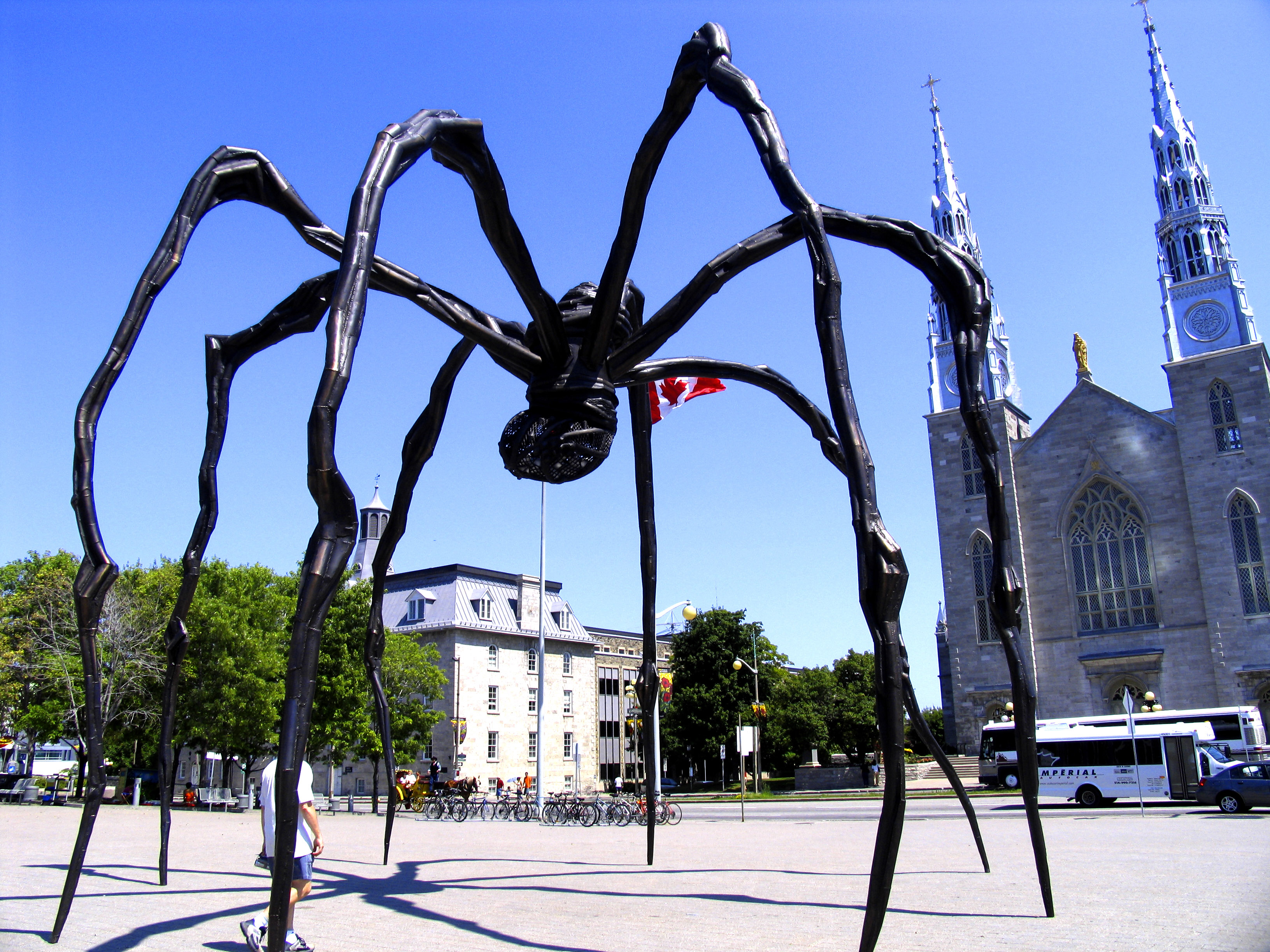
- Maman at the National Gallery of Canada, Ottawa
- Artist: Louise Bourgeois
- Year: 1999
- Type: Sculpture
- Medium: Stainless steel, bronze, marble
- Dimensions: 9.3 × 8.9 × 10.2 m

Maman (1999) is a bronze, stainless steel, and marble sculpture in several locations by the artist Louise Bourgeois. The sculpture, which depicts a spider, is among the world's largest, measuring over 30 ft high and over 33 ft wide (9.27 × 8.91 × 10.24 metres). It includes a sac containing 32 marble eggs. Its abdomen and thorax are made of rubbed bronze.

The title is the familiar French word for Mother (akin to Mummy or Mommy). The sculpture was created in 1999 by Bourgeois as a part of her inaugural commission of The Unilever Series (2000), in the Turbine Hall at London's Tate Modern. This original was created in steel, with an edition of six subsequent castings in bronze.

Bourgeois chose the Modern Art Foundry to cast the sculpture because of its reputation and work.

== Philosophy and meaning ==
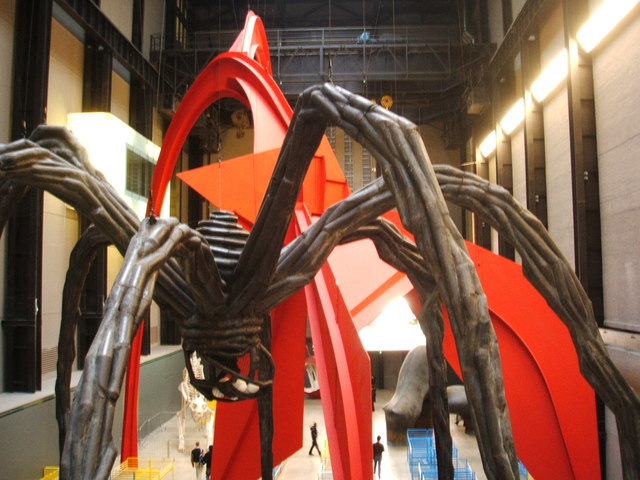
The original 1999 stainless steel Spider at the Tate Modern in 2009

The sculpture picks up the theme of the arachnid that Bourgeois had first contemplated in a small ink-and-charcoal drawing in 1947, continuing with her 1996 sculpture Spider. It alludes to the strength of Bourgeois' mother with metaphors of spinning, weaving, nurture and protection. Her mother, Josephine, repaired tapestries in her father's textile restoration workshop in Paris. When Bourgeois was 21, she lost her mother to an unknown illness. A few days after her mother's death, in front of her father (who did not seem to take his daughter's despair seriously), Louise threw herself into the Bièvre River; he swam to her rescue.

The Spider is an ode to my mother. She was my best friend. Like a spider, my mother was a weaver. My family was in the business of tapestry restoration, and my mother was in charge of the workshop. Like spiders, my mother was very clever. Spiders are friendly presences that eat mosquitoes. We know that mosquitoes spread diseases and are therefore unwanted. So, spiders are helpful and protective, just like my mother.

— Louise Bourgeois

== Permanent locations ==
- National Gallery of Canada, Ottawa, Canada – The National Gallery of Canada acquired the sculpture in 2004 for $3.2 million. The price took around a third of the annual budget of the gallery.
- Guggenheim Museum Bilbao, Spain
- Mori Art Museum, Tokyo, Japan – On display at the base of Mori Tower, outside the museum.
- Crystal Bridges Museum of American Art, Bentonville, Arkansas, United States
- Leeum, Samsung Museum of Art, Seoul, South Korea
- Qatar National Convention Center, Doha, Qatar
- Kemper Museum of Contemporary Art, Kansas City, Missouri, United States

== Temporary locations ==
Tours and featured exhibitions of Maman include:

- 2001: Rockefeller Center Plaza, New York, United States
- 2001: City Hall, The Hague, Netherlands
- 2002: State Hermitage Museum, Saint Petersburg, Russia
- 2003: Nytorv, Copenhagen, Denmark
- 2005: Havana, Cuba
- 2006: Mariakerke, Ostend, Belgium
- 2007: Wanås Castle, Sweden
- 2008: Jardin des Tuileries, Paris, France
- 2008: Centre Pompidou, Paris, France
- 2007–2008: Institute of Contemporary Art, Boston, United States 27 March 2007 – 2 March 2008
- 2008–2009: Museo di Capodimonte, Naples, Italy 18 October 2008 – 25 January 2009
- 2011: Fundacion Proa, Buenos Aires, Argentina
- 2011: Museu de Arte Moderna (MAM), São Paulo, Brazil
- 2011: Bundesplatz, Bern, Switzerland, 24 May – 7 June
- 2011 Bürkliplatz, Zurich, Switzerland, 10 June – 2 August
- 2011 Place Neuve, Geneva, Switzerland, 3 August – 28 August
- 2011–2012 Beyeler Foundation, Riehen/Basel, Switzerland, 3 September 2011 – 8 January 2012
- 2012 Hamburger Kunsthalle, Hamburg, Germany, 23 January – 17 June
- 2012 Qatar National Convention Centre, Qatar – The Maman sculpture; exhibited from 20 January – 1 June, at the Qatar National Convention Centre as the centerpiece of the Conscious and Unconscious exhibition; the first solo exhibit of Bourgeois' work to be displayed in the Middle East. The exhibit was organised by the Qatar Museums Authority.
- 2012–2013 Roppongi Hills, Tokyo, Japan
- 2014 Qatar National Convention Centre, Doha, Qatar, February
- 2013-2014 Palacio de Bellas Artes, Mexico City, Mexico, 15 November 2013 – 2 March 2014
- 2015 Moderna Museet, Stockholm, Sweden, January 2015 – 17 May
- 2015 Garage Museum of Contemporary Art, Moscow, Russia, 25 September – 7 February
- 2020 Museum Voorlinden, The Hague, Netherlands, until 17 May
- 2020–2021 Fundação de Serralves, Porto, Portugal, December 2020 – February 2021
- 2022 Stavros Niarchos Foundation Cultural Center, Athens, Greece, 30 March – 6 November
- 2023 Palace Park in Oslo, Norway, 24 April - August
- 2023–2024 Art Gallery of New South Wales in Sydney, Australia, 25 November 2023 – 28 April 2024
- 2025- Khao Yai Art Forest, Nakhon Ratchasima, Thailand

== See also ==
- Cultural depictions of spiders
- List of artworks by Louise Bourgeois

== Gallery ==
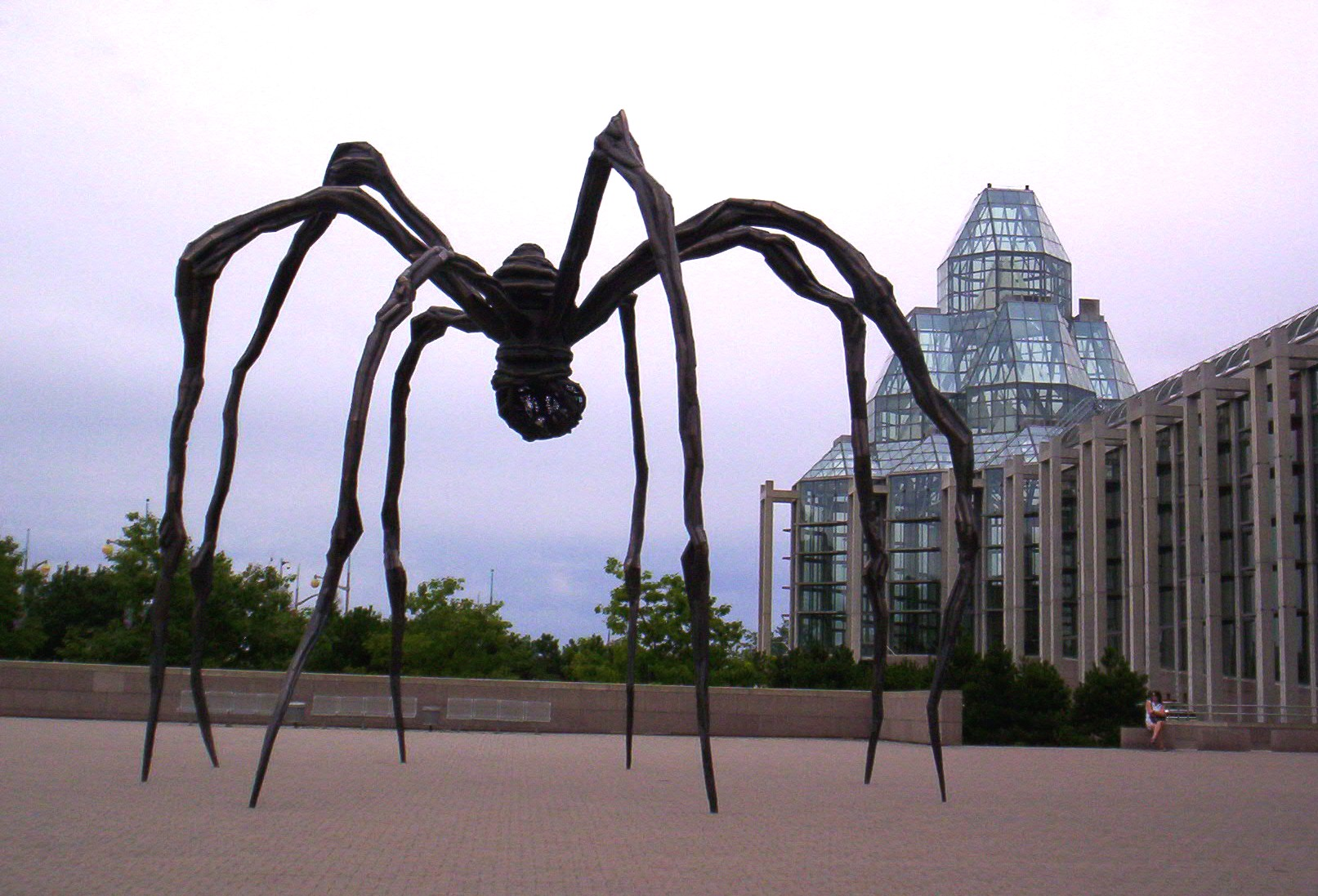
At the National Gallery, Ottawa, Canada

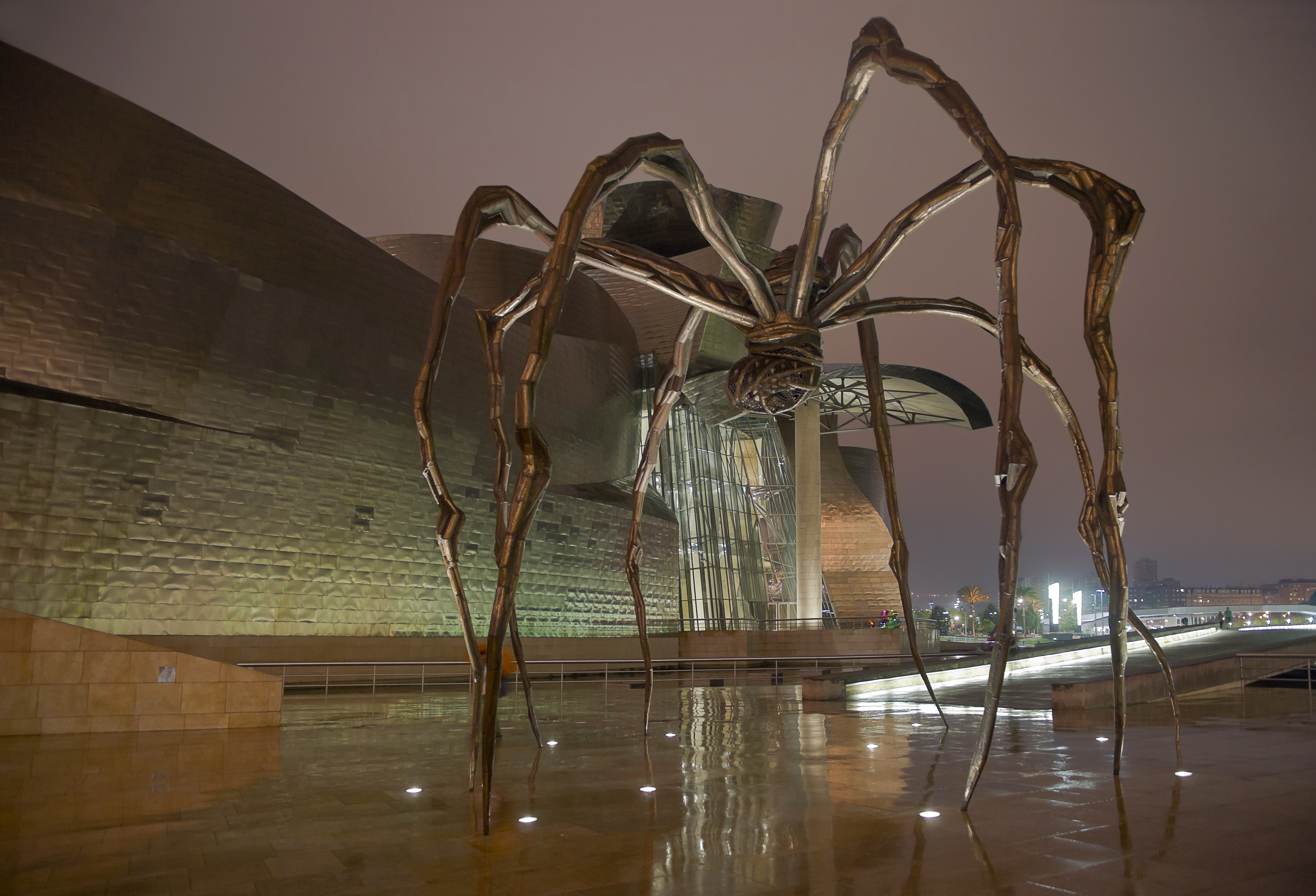
At the Guggenheim Museum, Bilbao, Spain

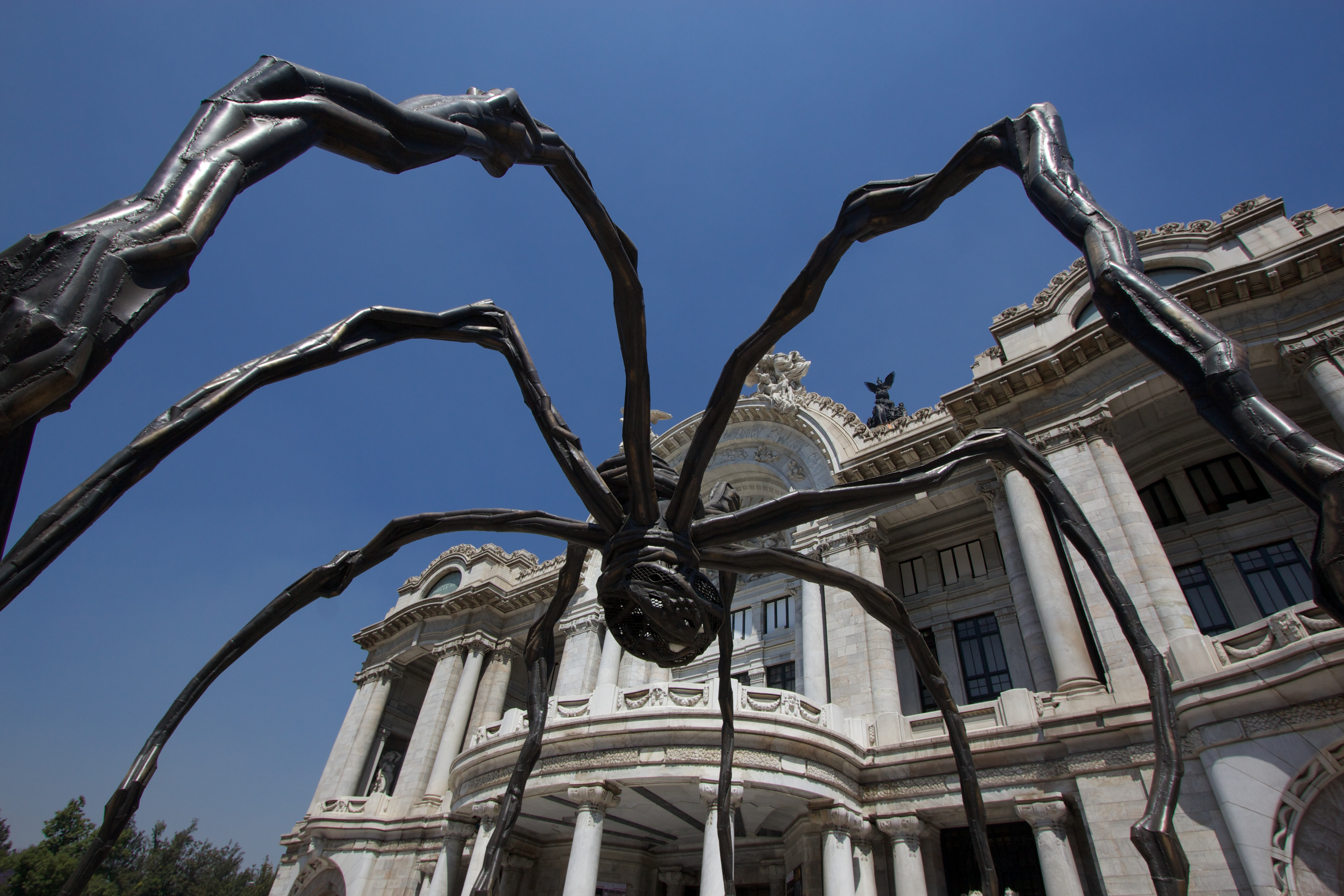
At Palacio de Bellas Artes, Mexico City, Mexico

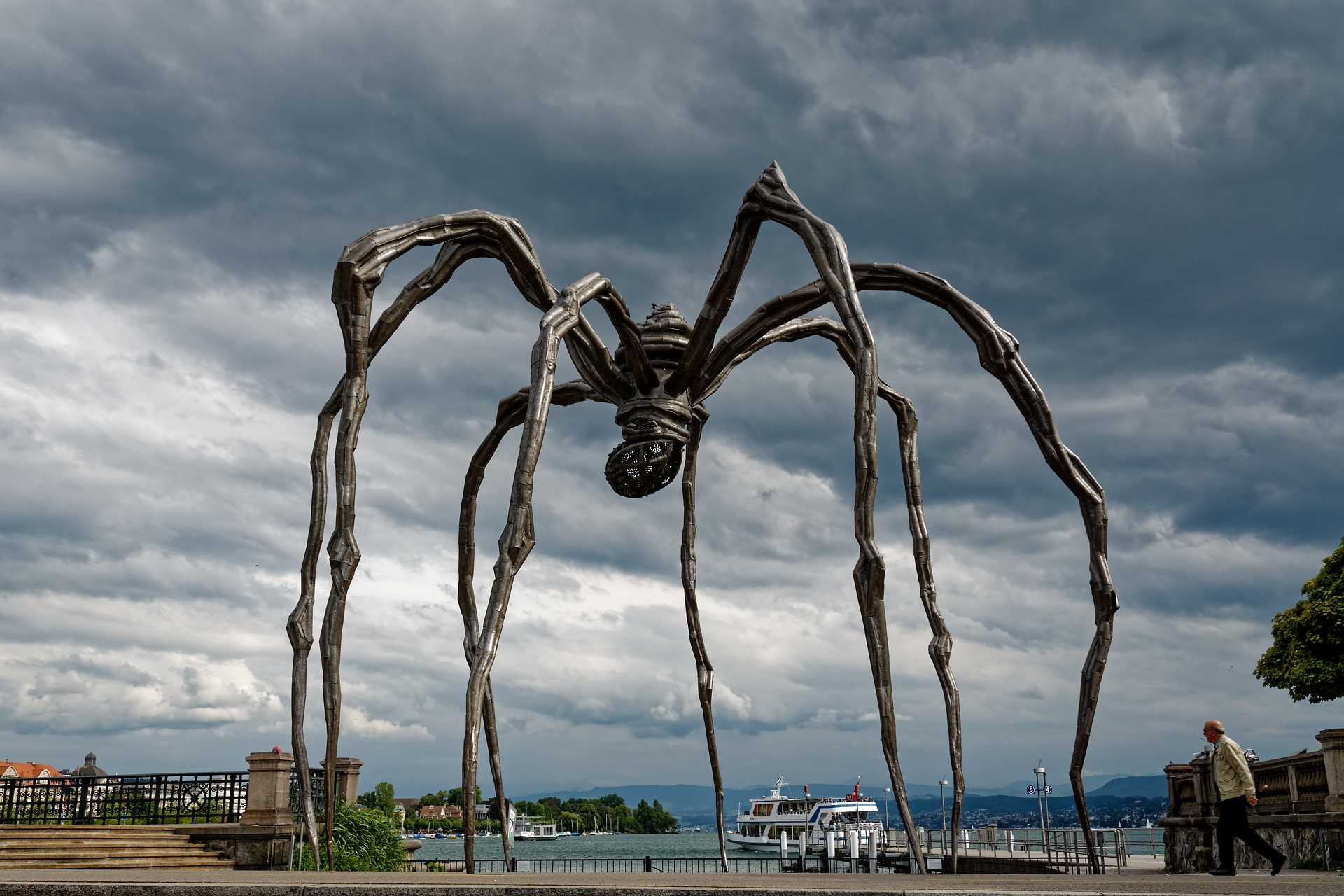
At Bürkliplatz, Zurich, Switzerland, 2011
