= Tête de femme (Dora Maar) =

Sculpture by Pablo Picasso

- Artist: Pablo Picasso
- Year: 1941 (plaster); 1950s (bronze)
- Type: Bronze
- Dimensions: 80 cm (31.5 in)
- Owner: Various

Tête de femme (Dora Maar) is a plaster-modelled, bronze-cast sculpture by Pablo Picasso. Dora Maar, Picasso's lover at the time, was the subject of the work which was originally conceived in 1941. Four copies of the bust were cast in the 1950s, several years after the relationship ended.

== Description ==
The bronze bust focuses on the head and neck with only a brief shoulder-line visible before the squared-off base. At a height of 31.5 inches (80 cm) it is a particularly large and heavy sculpture. It has been noted as being an "almost goddess-like" depiction of the model, sharply contrasting the usual dark, distorted, and aggressive. It is reminiscent of the work of Auguste Rodin and Greco-Roman sculptors.

Picasso modelled the piece on lover Dora Maar during World War II, making the original from plaster in his Paris studio. Completed in 1941, the plaster model is now housed in the Museum Ludwig in Cologne. The difficulties in obtaining an adequate supply of metal meant that the work was put on hold until the early 1950s, with four copies being made when Picasso had the supplies. One copy of the sculpture was donated in 1959 to a memorial for Guillaume Apollinaire, a friend of Picasso who died in 1918, and can be found on his grave behind the Abbey of Saint-Germain-des-Prés. This copy was stolen in 1999 but was eventually recovered and returned to the church. A second casting belongs to the Beyeler Foundation, a museum in Riehen near Basel. Two others remained with the Picasso family, one of which was with the artist's granddaughter Marina Picasso until she sold it in 2006 to an unknown buyer. This edition appeared in auction the following year.

== Auction ==
Jan Krugier, a dealer from Geneva, acquired the sculpture for an unidentified party from Marina Picasso and displayed it in December 2006 at Art Basel Miami Beach. It was one of the most valuable works featured at the event and failed to sell. The decision was taken to offer the sculpture at auction with Sotheby's chosen to handle the deal. The piece was on view in London in October before moving to New York in November ready for the sale.

The Impressionist and Modern Art auction was held on 7 November 2007 featuring works by Vincent van Gogh, Paul Gauguin, Egon Schiele, and a second piece by Picasso. La Lampe, an oil on canvas painting from 1931, depicts Picasso's previous lover, Marie-Thérèse Walter. Neither of his works had been auctioned before. While La Lampe failed to sell when it was unable to reach the low estimate of £25 million, Tete de femme (Dora Maar) was sold for a record price. Private dealer Franck Giraud paid $29.1 million for the sculpture, nearing the top end of the $20–$30 million estimate and setting a new record for the price of a sculpture at auction. The record lasted just under a month, being easily beaten by the ancient Guennol Lioness. However, it remained the most valuable modern work until Constantin Brâncuși's Madame LR (Portrait de Mme LR) was sold in February 2009.

== See also ==
- List of most expensive sculptures
