= Bangkok Kunsthalle =

- บางกอก คุนส์ฮาเลอ บางกอก คุนสตาเล่อ
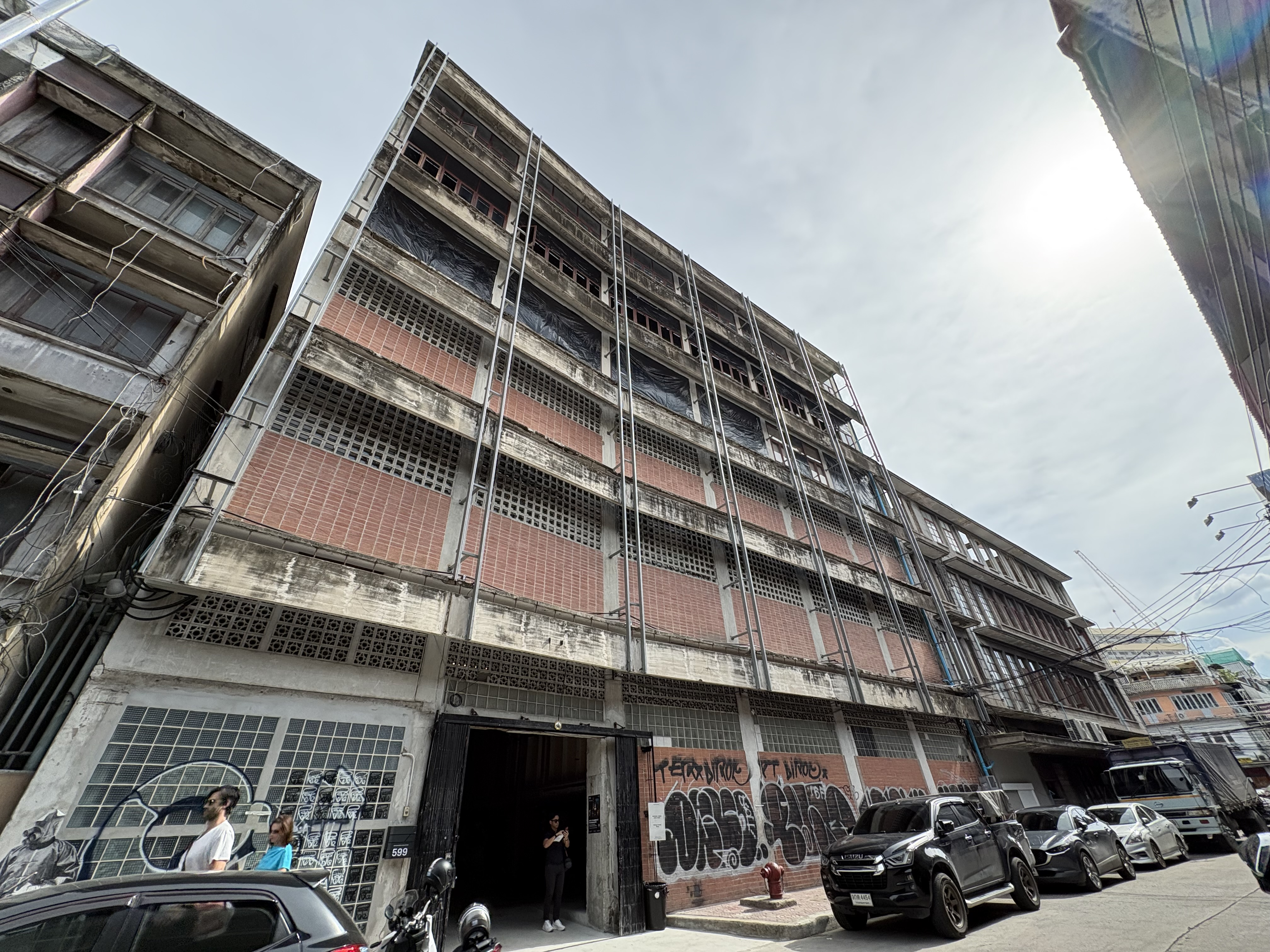
- Established: 2024
- Location: 599 Soi Phantha Chit, Pom Prap Sattru Phai, Bangkok, Thailand
- Founder: Marisa Chearavanont
- Director: Stefano Rabolli Pansera

Bangkok Kunsthalle (Thai: บางกอก คุนส์ฮาเลอ or บางกอก คุนสตาเล่อ) is a kunsthalle in Bangkok, Thailand.

== History ==
Opened in 2024, the center is located in the former Thai Wattana Panich Printing House that was abandoned following a fire in 2001. The brutalist complex is spread across three connected buildings and spans nearly 65,000 square feet. The Kunsthalle is the urban counterpart to Khao Yai Art Forest in Nakhon Ratchasima province, also purchased by philanthropist Marisa Chearavanont.

The inaugural exhibition featured works by French filmmaker Michel Auder.

== See also ==
- Khao Yai Art Forest
- Kunsthalle
