= Spider (Bourgeois) =

Sculpture by Louise Bourgeois

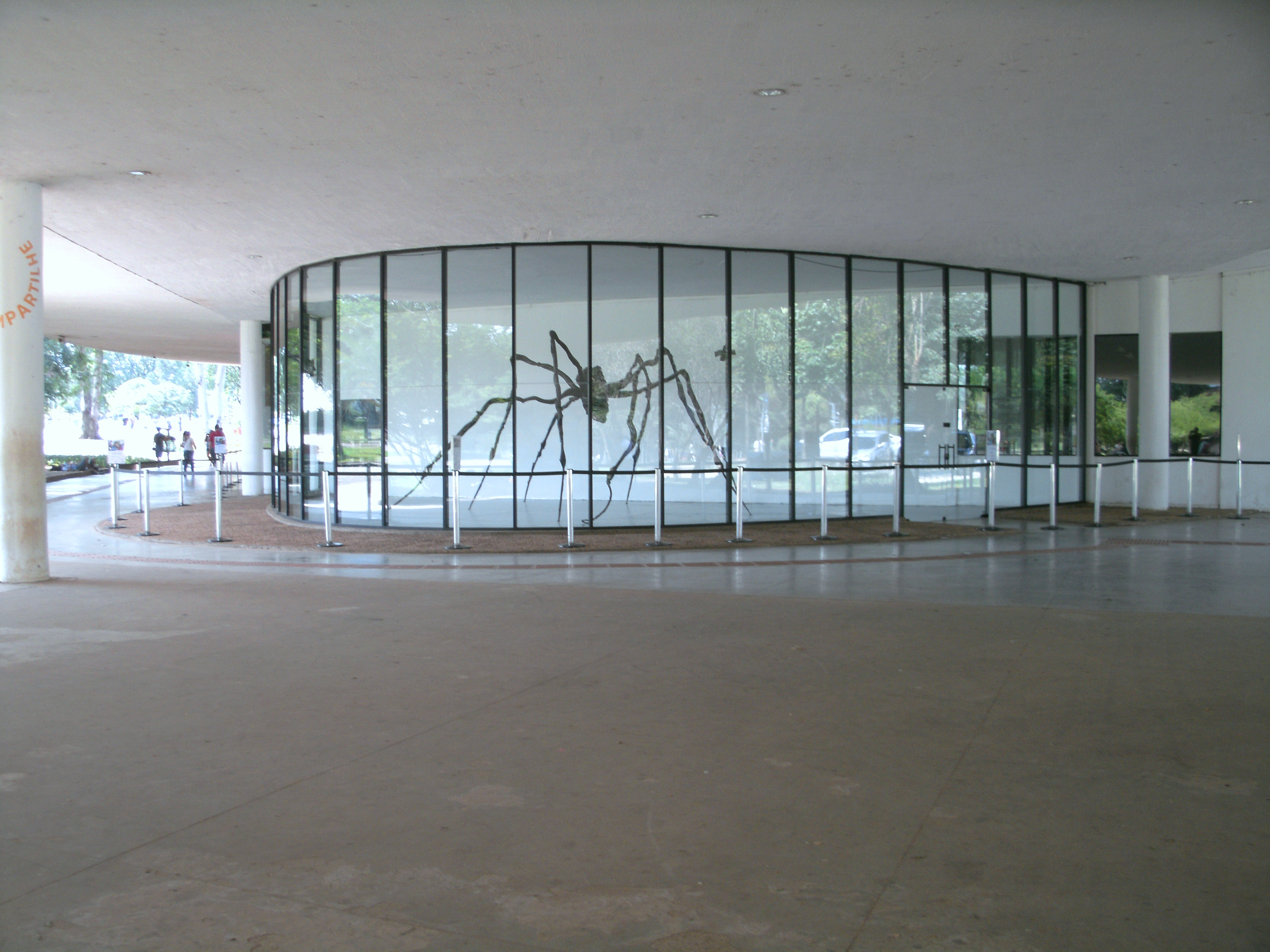
- Spider at Ibirapuera Park, São Paulo, Brazil, 2013
- Artist: Louise Bourgeois
- Year: 1996
- Medium: Bronze
- Subject: Spider
- Dimensions: 440 cm × 670 cm × 520 cm (175 in × 262 in × 204 in)
- Location: Garage Museum of Contemporary Art, Moscow

Spider is a sculpture by Louise Bourgeois. It was executed in 1996 as an edition of a series entitled Cells and cast in 1997; bronze with a silver nitrate patina, with the first of the edition being steel. The spider itself is made of bronze, whereas the cage is made of steel.

Spider has held the record for most expensive sculptures by a woman three times in a row, and was sold for $32.1 million in 2019.

== Composition ==
While the spider itself is bronze, the rest of the sculpture uses a variety of multimedia techniques. These materials include steel, fabric, wood, glass, tapestry, rubber, bone, silver, and gold. Spider stands 175 x 262 x 204 inches, nearly 15 feet in height. Underneath the belly of the spider's main body there is a basket with three glass eggs inside. The spider hovers over a large steel cage, with its body resting on the top and its giant legs surrounding it. Inside the cage there is a singular chair with a tapestry on it. The cage is decorated with several other tapestries as well. There are also various other household objects and trinkets that have been hung, strewn, or stuck into the cage.

=== The spider ===
The legs are thick, but in his first-hand description of the piece, Dutch cultural theorist, video and literary scholar, and professor at the University of Amsterdam, Mieke Bal, describes them as being, "like a ballerina's; they stand on fine points of needle sharp toes." Of the spider's eight legs, all of them stick out away from the cage, surround it, except for one that points back in towards the sculpture. The basket containing eggs is thought to imply that the spider is female and maternal in nature.

=== The cage ===
The cage is circular and is approximately 4.5 meters in diameter and 5 meters in height. Two pieces of bone, that have been emptied of marrow, are stuck in the side of it. Several tapestries are hung on it.

=== The chair ===
The chair stands alone in the center of the cage. It is a simple director's chair that has been draped with fabric. Near the bottom of the fabric there are two snakes on either side facing inwards towards the middle of the piece. At the bottom there are 2D representations of tassels.

=== The tapestries ===
On one side of the cage there is a fragmented tapestry of a woman. Her torso is missing from the image in a cut out resembling the shape of the letter 'S'.

To the left there is another fragment of fabric that depicts a crown with curly hair underneath, an owl flying upwards, and a blue sky. On a separated fragment of the same piece, viewers can see a door and a hand.

Inside the cage there is another tapestry panel leaning on the side to the left of the chair. In this image there is a leg, from the knee down, in the act of walking. There are scattered grasses and flowers in the background of the landscape.

Another tapestry, which extends the whole height of the cage, contains a wooded landscape. It has a black background with a towering tree covered in foliage and flowers. At the bottom of this piece, a swan is swimming with its head turned towards a snake with an open maw.

=== Miscellaneous other components ===
There is another bone, not stuck into the cage, but hung on a thread tied to the upper steel of the structure. Higher up there is a larger bone stuck into the side of the cage. More bones litter the interior of the cage as well. There are three small glass jars upside down on short pins. A key is also hanging inside the cage along with perfume bottles (thought to be reminiscent of a girl's youth), a medal, and a watch.

== Symbolism ==
Among scholars, the spider is thought to be a symbol of Bourgeois' mother, who was a weaver and a tapestry restorer. One scholar in particular, Mieke Bal, even went so far as to posit that the figure of the spider is a direct metaphor for her mother's care and protection with regard to family life. As a child, Bourgeois worked in her mother's shop and was tasked with drawing in the missing elements of worn or damaged tapestries. The incomplete fabrics on and in the cage are thought to be symbolic of that element of her childhood. Jerry Gorovoy, Bourgeois' long time assistant, said that this piece was representative of a place where she felt safe: surrounded by the spider as her mother and the tapestries that reminded her of her childhood. Gorovoy also says that the artist treasured these memories, especially those of her mother, and is aiming to preserve them with this piece. Bourgeois would later expand upon these themes of motherhood and her portrayal of spiders with her 1999 sculpture Maman, which she expressly described as "An ode to my mother. She was my best friend. Like a spider, my mother was a weaver... Spiders are helpful and protective, just like my mother."

== Exhibitions ==
The Spider found a home in Moscow, Russia at the Garage Museum of Contemporary Art in 2015. The Guggenheim had the piece on display as a part of their temporary collection Louise Bourgeois: Structures of Existence; the Cells until September 2016. The sculpture then went to the Louisiana for their exhibition from October 2016 until February 2017. Spider was also showcased at the MoMA in New York from September 24, 2017 until January 28, 2018 in an exhibition entitled Louise Bourgeois: An Unfolding Portrait.

== Art market ==
In 2006, Bourgeois became the highest-paid living woman artist after a Spider sold for $4 million at Christie's in London; which was surpassed in 2008, when another Spider sold for $4.5 million. A new record price for the artist was achieved when Spider number two, acquired from Gallery Paule Anglim, San Francisco, was auctioned by a private collector with an estimate of $4 million to $6 million. The price realized at Christie's on 8 November 2011 was $10,722,500. This is the highest price paid for an artwork by a woman artist at the time. This was surpassed in 2015 by a Spider auctioned by Christie's for $28.2 million. Christie's was then estimated to sell the sculpture for anywhere up to $35 million at a contemporary art sale in New York in May 2019.

== See also ==
- List of artworks by Louise Bourgeois
- Cultural depictions of spiders
- Maman (sculpture)
