= Tête (sculpture) =

Sculpture by Amedeo Modigliani

- Artist: Amedeo Modigliani
- Year: 1910–1912
- Type: Limestone
- Dimensions: 65 cm (25.6 in)
- Owner: Anonymous bidder

Tête ([tɛt], 'Head') is a limestone sculpture by Amedeo Modigliani and is amongst the most expensive works of art ever sold. In 2010 an anonymous telephone bidder purchased Tête for €43.2 million at Christie's in Paris. The sale was a record at a French auction and placed the sculpture amongst the most expensive ever sold. Since 1927 the piece had been in the collection of Gaston Lévy, an artist and acquaintance of Modigliani.

== Description ==
Tête is one of 27 known sculptures by Modigliani and was made between 1910 and 1912. The limestone head stands over 2 feet tall and depicts the head of a woman wearing a tribal mask with her hair swept back. It was first exhibited at the 1912 Salon d'Automne (Autumn Salon).

In the creation of Tête, Modigliani was clearly inspired by the geometric designs of African sculpture and the simplification of form evident in the work of his mentor Constantin Brâncuși. Auction house Christie's described the piece in an announcement press release as: "Pared-down to a series of simple geometric forms, rigidly frontal and rigorously symmetrical, Tête emanates a feeling of haunting mystery."

== Auction ==
After the decision was made to sell Tête the piece was exhibited in New York, gaining many admirers and increasing interest in the auction. This was seen as a contributing factor in the unexpectedly high sale price.

The Impressionist and Modern Art auction was held on 14 June 2010 and led by François de Ricqlès, the president of Christie's France. The event began with a 24-piece collection owned by Gaston Lévy, co-founder of what would become the French supermarket chain Monoprix. Lévy, himself a keen artist, was an acquaintance of Modigliani, and purchased the Tête sculpture in 1927.

Around 20 bidders, most of whom were not present at the auction and instead phoned in their bid, competed for the piece in the opening ten minutes. The expected price of €4m–€6m was quickly surpassed and towards the end only four bidders remained. The winning bidder, who remained anonymous, paid €43,185,000 (£35,886,735, $52,620,923), the highest price for any work of art sold in France and one of the highest paid for a sculpture in the world.

== See also ==
- Paintings by Amedeo Modigliani
- List of most expensive sculptures
