= Bird in Space =

Sculpture by Constantin Brâncuși

- L'Oiseau dans l'espace (French), Pasărea în văzduh (Romanian)
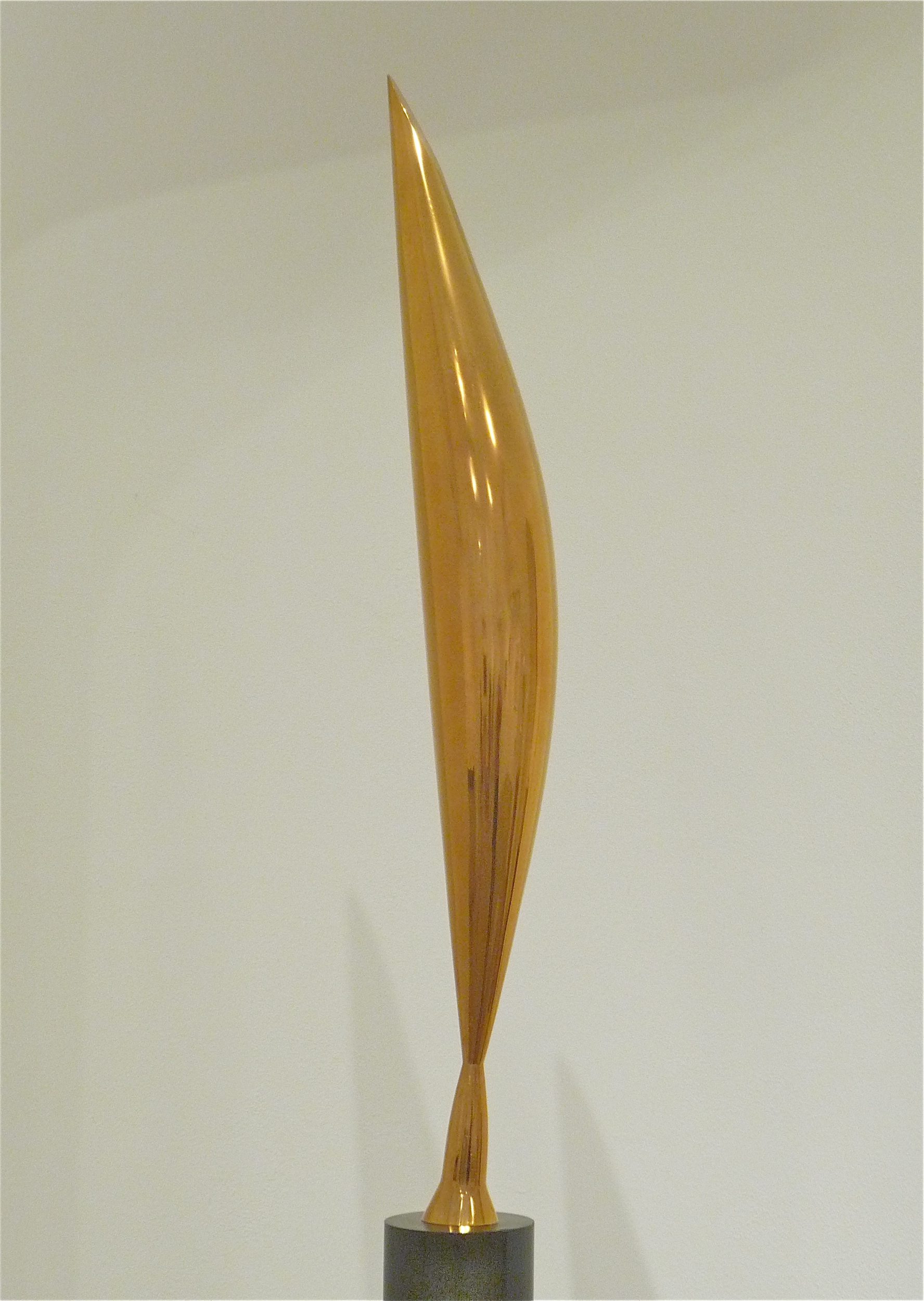
- Bronze cast in the Philadelphia Museum of Art
- Artist: Constantin Brâncuși
- Year: 1923-1940
- Medium: Marble, bronze
- Movement: Modernism

Bird in Space (L'Oiseau dans l'espace) is a series of sculptures by Romanian sculptor Constantin Brâncuși. The original work was created in 1923 and made of marble. This sculpture is also known for containing seven marble figures and nine bronze casts. Brancusi created the piece over 14 times and in several mediums over a period of 20 years. It was sold in 2005 for $25.8 million, at the time a record price for a sculpture sold in an auction. The original title in Romanian is Pasărea în văzduh.

== Description ==
In the Bird in Space works, Brâncuși concentrated not on the physical attributes of the bird, but instead on its movement. For example, the sculpture does not feature wings or feathers. The Met's description depicts the art as featuring an "elongated body, and the head and beak are reduced to a slanted oval plane."

External videos
- Smarthistory – Brancusi, Bird in Space

The height of the sculpture is 287.7 cm. Seven of the sculptures in the series are made of marble, while the other nine were cast in polished bronze.

=== Art galleries where the sculptures reside ===
- The first and best known of the series is housed in the Metropolitan Museum of Art in New York City, while two bronze casts (1928 and c.1941) reside in that city's Museum of Modern Art.
- Two versions of the sculpture, one bronze (1924) and one marble (1923–1924), are housed in the Philadelphia Museum of Art. The National Gallery of Art in Washington, D.C., is home to a marble and a bronze from 1925 and 1927, respectively.
- A 1926 bronze is held by the Seattle Art Museum but is currently not on display.
- Two more bronze casts (1925–1926 and 1927) are on display at the Los Angeles County Museum of Art and a 1931 bronze cast is housed at the Norton Simon Museum in Pasadena, California.
- Another bronze of unknown casting date resides in the Peggy Guggenheim Collection in Venice, Italy, and the National Gallery of Australia in Canberra owns two marbles, both c.1931–1936, one white and one black.

== Brancusi v. United States ==
In 1926, Bird in Space was the subject of a court battle over its taxation by U.S. Customs. In October 1926, Bird in Space, along with 19 other Brâncuși sculptures, arrived in New York harbor aboard the steamship Paris. While works of art are not subject to custom duties, the customs officials refused to believe that the tall, thin piece of polished bronze was art. Therefore, the officials imposed the tariff for manufactured metal objects, 40% of the sale price or about $230 (over $3130 in 2016 U.S. dollars).

Marcel Duchamp (who was an artist that accompanied the sculptures from Europe), American photographer Edward Steichen (who was to take possession of Bird in Space after exhibition), and Brâncuși himself were indignant; the sculptures were set to appear at the Brummer Gallery, an avant-garde art gallery in New York City, and then the Arts Club in Chicago. Under pressure from the press and artists, U.S. customs agreed to rethink their classification of the items, releasing the sculptures on bond (under "Kitchen Utensils and Hospital Supplies") until a decision could be reached. However, customs appraiser F. J. H. Kracke eventually confirmed the initial classification of items and said that they were subject to duty. Kracke told the New York Evening Post that "several men, high in the art world were asked to express their opinions for the Government.... One of them told us, 'If that's art, hereafter I'm a bricklayer.' Another said, 'Dots and dashes are as artistic as Brâncuși's work.' In general, it was their opinion that Brâncuși left too much to the imagination." The next month, Steichen filed an appeal to the U.S. Customs' decision to reclaim the money.

Under the 1922 Tariff Act, for a sculpture to count as duty-free it must be an original work of art, with no practical purpose, made by a professional sculptor. No one argued that the piece had a practical purpose, but whether or not the sculpture was art was hotly contested. The 1916 case United States v. Olivotti had established that sculptures were art only if they were carved or chiseled representations of natural objects "in their true proportions." Therefore, a series of artists and art experts testified for both the defense and the prosecution about the definition of art and who decides exactly what art is.

Charles J. Lane, M. J. Speiser and Thomas M. Lane were Brâncuși's lawyers. Six major figures testified for Brâncuși that Bird in Space was art. They were Edward Steichen, Jacob Epstein, Forbes Watson, Frank Crowninshield, William Henry Fox and Henry McBride. Brâncuși who disliked the public attention did not attend the trial, retreating to his Paris Studio. The government enlisted Robert Aitken and Thomas Jones as witnesses that Bird in Space was not art.

In reply to the court's question as to whether the sculpture was a bird or not, the expert witnesses emphasised that the Bird's 'birdness' was of little relevance. The artists and art experts highlighted the importance of realising the fact that Brâncuși was moving towards abstract works of art, and it is therefore important to take into account what each individual artist is aiming to achieve in their works.

Brâncuși's affidavit to the American Consulate explained the process of creating the piece, establishing its originality:

I conceived it to be created in bronze and I made a plaster model of it. This I gave to the founder, together with the formula for the bronze alloy and other necessary indications. When the roughcast was delivered to me, I had to stop up the air holes and the core hole, to correct the various defects, and to polish the bronze with files and very fine emery. All this I did myself, by hand; this artistic finishing takes a very long time and is equivalent to beginning the whole work over again. I did not allow anybody else to do any of this finishing work, as the subject of the bronze was my own special creation and nobody but myself could have carried it out to my satisfaction.

The purpose of the deposition was to illustrate that the sculpture did indeed comply with the requirements of the Tariff Act of 1922.

There was initially a question over the originality of the piece, as there were four other bird sculptures that Brâncuși had produced. Therefore, it was unclear as to whether this piece of art could be thought of as something which had never been seen before. However, every piece of metal used in the sculptures was unique, which established the threshold of originality. Despite the varied opinions on what qualifies as art presented to the court, in November 1928 Judges Young and Waite found in favor of the artist. The decision drafted by Waite concluded:

The object now under consideration ... is beautiful and symmetrical in outline, and while some difficulty might be encountered in associating it with a bird, it is nevertheless pleasing to look at and highly ornamental, and as we hold under the evidence that it is the original production of a professional sculptor and is in fact a piece of sculpture and a work of art according to the authorities above referred to, we sustain the protest and find that it is entitled to free entry.

This was the first court decision to accept that a non-representational sculpture (abstract) could be considered art.

Another issue concerns the competence of the court to judge the aesthetics of artworks. Is the law competent to resolve the question through legal criteria and evidence established by artists and curators in the courtroom? Overall, Judge Waite concluded that the sculpture was 'beautiful', 'symmetrical' and 'ornamental', and therefore should be considered art.

== Legacy ==
Bird in Space was the inspiration for a classical music composition by composer Tim Corpus. This work was premiered at the 2012 architectural festival Open House Chicago, in which the piece was performed throughout the festival at the Arts Club of Chicago.

The American poet, Muriel Rukeyser (1913–1980) refers to Brâncuși's "Bird" in her poem, "Reading time: 1 minute 26 seconds" (1939) and uses this link to highlight the fear we have of embracing the new and non-utilitarian in the arts, and to encourage us to break through an unhealthy mind-set so that we may see the world anew: "... The climax when the brain acknowledges the world, / all values extended into the blood awake. / Moment of proof. And as they say Brancusi did, / building his bird to extend through soaring air, / as Kafka planned stories that draw to eternity / through time extended. And the climax strikes. ..." (from A Turning Wind, 1939. Muriel Rukeyser).

== See also ==
- List of most expensive sculptures
- Scandals in art
