= Marisa Chearavanont =

Thai philanthropist

Marisa Chearavanont (Thai: มาริษา เจียรวนนท์), also known as Kang Soo-hyeong, is a Thai-Korean social entrepreneur, philanthropist, and art collector. She is special advisor to Dhanin Chearavanont, the Senior Chairman of Charoen Pokphand Group, a multinational conglomerate. She is also founder and chairman of Chef Cares Project, Chef Cares Foundation, and Khaoyai Art, a Thailand-based art institution. She is also a patron and member of the committees of a number of art institutions. She was named one of the "Women of the Year 2024" by the Bangkok Post.

== Early life ==
Born in Seoul, South Korea, Chearavanont moved to the USA at the age of 18. She completed her Bachelor of Science in Finance and International Business at New York University and worked at Nomura Securities International Inc. It was in New York that she met her future husband, Soopakij Chearavanont. They married in 1988, relocated to Thailand, and have birthed 4 children, including Tanit Chearavanont. She became a Thai citizen in 1990.

== Career ==
In 2005, she co-founded The BUILD, a foundation focused on building schools and offering career training in remote rural areas for marginalized communities. She also works with Thai chefs on the Chef Cares Projects and the Chef Cares Foundation, initiatives that use culinary arts and food innovations to support sustainable social impact. She serves as CEO and chairperson of these projects.

She serves on the Asia-Pacific Acquisition Committee for Tate Modern in London and the International Leadership Council for the New Museum in New York City. In 2022, she became the recipient of the RINASCIMENTO+ Award. She is a founding patron of the M+ Museum in Hong Kong and a member of the BACC Foundation committee in Bangkok. She has also been appointed as a senior expert by Thailand's Ministry of Culture and the Office of the Prime Minister to support contemporary art, culture, and national identity initiatives in Thailand.

In 2023, she founded Khaoyai Art, a Thailand-based contemporary art institution comprising Bangkok Kunsthalle and Khao Yai Art Forest.

=== Chef Cares ===
During the COVID-19 pandemic, Chearavanont partnered with over 70 chefs in Thailand, including Michelin-starred chefs Chumpol Jangprai, Jay Fai, and Deepanker Khosla, to prepare and deliver meals to frontline medical workers, transit staff, and communities in need. Following this initiative, she founded the Chef Cares Foundation.

Through the Chef Cares Foundation, Chearavanont combines the promotion of Thai gastronomy with contemporary art. In 2022, she invited Jay Fai to perform as a culinary artist at the Museo Novecento during Florence Art Week, where Jay Fai's use of traditional Thai kitchen equipment in Italy garnered significant media attention both locally and internationally. In 2023, Chearavanont invited Jay Fai to reprise her performance at the Korea Furniture Museum during Frieze Seoul, where she reportedly introduced Jay Fai to executives from Nongshim, leading to a collaboration with the South Korean instant noodle brand, Shin Ramyun.

== Awards ==
- Yuthitham Damrong Chan Tee See Honours (2024): Recognition for Contributions in Social Justice; Ministry of Justice; Thailand
- Women of The Year (2024): Thai Cuisine Advocate; Bangkok Post Newspaper; Thailand
- RINASCIMENTO+ Award (2022): International Award for Art Collector; Italy; First Award Recipient from Asia
