= Beata Mårtensson-Brummer =

Swedish painter, ceramist and art teacher

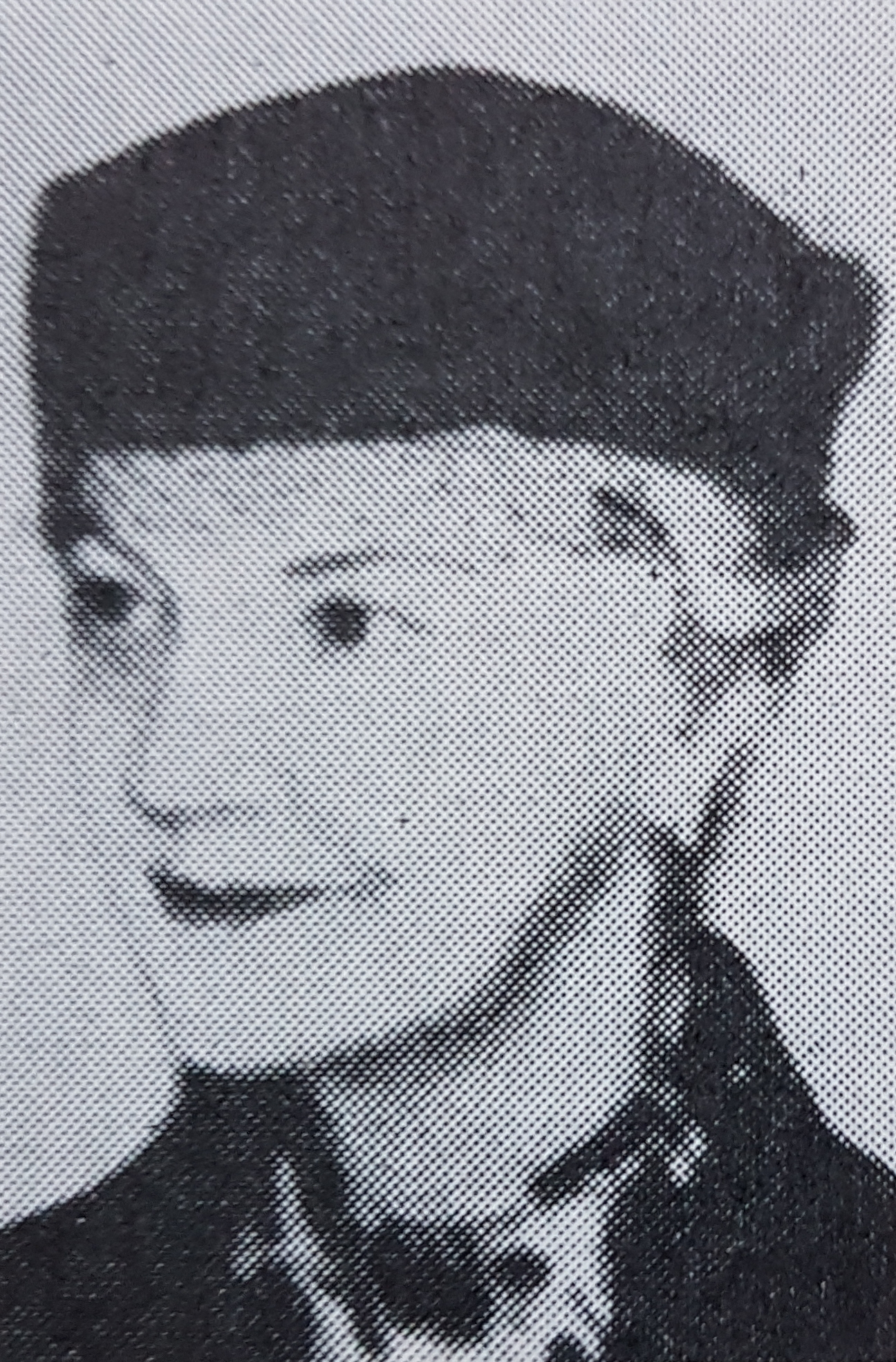
Beata Mårtensson-Brummer

Beata Mårtensson-Brummer (1 April 1880 — 15 July 1956) was a Swedish painter, ceramist, art teacher and philanthropist. After studying in Stockholm, France and Italy, from 1908 she worked at the Gustavsberg Porcelain Factory where she designed glazed vases and pottery. She taught painting at the Högre konstindustriella skolan (now Konstfack) where she was appointed head teacher in 1915. In 1911, she married the Hungarian-born sculptor Joseph Brummer. After first helping him to run his gallery in Paris, in 1920 she joined him in New York where he ran the Brummer Gallery in Manhattan until his death in 1947. Mårtensson-Brummer returned to Sweden in 1953. On her death in 1956, she bequeathed considerable amounts of funding to Sweden's cultural institutions.

== Early life, education and family ==
Born in Lund on 1 April 1880, Beata Mårtensson was the daughter of the farmer Nils Mårtensson and his wife Bengta née Nilsdotter, She was the youngest of the family's six children. She studied at Stockholms's arts and crafts college Högre konstindustriella skolan (HKS, now Konstfack) graduating in 1902 and undertook study trips to Paris and Italy. In 1911, she married the Hungarian-born sculptor Joseph Brummer at a civil wedding in London.

== Career ==
From 1908 to 1910, Mårtensson-Brummer designed and decorated vases and pottery in stoneware at the Gustavsberg Porcelain Factory where she collaborated closely with Gunnar Gunnarsson Wennerberg. While she followed his approach, she developed her own particular graphic style. On graduating, she was appointed as a painting instructor at Högre konstindustriella skolan until 1911. After a period in Paris where she helped her husband and his brothers with their gallery, she returned to Stockholm in 1915 to take up an appointment as head teacher at HKS which she maintained until 1920.

She then joined her husband in New York where she helped him run his gallery in Manhattan. In particular, she arranged many exhibitions of European modern art. When he died in 1947, she moved back to Stockholm.

Mårtensson-Brummer was a versatile artist, painting in both oils and watercolours. In addition to decorating ceramics, she made designs for lace and tapestry. She participated in Stockholm's 1909 Art Industry Exhibition and later at the city's Konstnärshuset. Her works are represented in Sweden's National Museum and in the collections of Gustav VI Adoft and Waldemarsudde.

Beata Mårtensson-Brummer died in Stockholm on 15 July 1956, leaving a significant fortune to Sweden's cultural institutions as well as many high-quality objets d'art.
