= Khao Yai Art Forest =

Coordinates: 14°34′07″N 101°30′36″E

- ศิลป่าเขาใหญ่
- Established: February 2025
- Location: Nakhon Ratchasima, Thailand
- Founder: Marisa Chearavanont
- Director: Stefano Rabolli Pansera

Khao Yai Art Forest (Thai: ศิลป่าเขาใหญ่; RTGS: Sinlapa Khao Yai) is an open-air museum in the Khao Yai area of Nakhon Ratchasima province, near Khao Yai National Park.

== History ==
The 161 acres of land for the museum was purchased in 2022 by Marisa Chearavanont, a Korean-born philanthropist. The museum opened on 6 February 2025.

The Forest features artworks made using local materials that are integrated into the natural landscape, including a fog sculpture by Fujiko Nakaya and a Maman spider sculpture by Louise Bourgeois, along with a rice field. The Forest also features a bar designed by Elmgreen & Dragset.

== See also ==
- Bangkok Kunsthalle
