= Alastair Martin =

American tennis player and art collector

Alastair Bradley Martin (March 11, 1915 – January 12, 2010) was a Tennis Hall of Fame inductee, and president of the United States Lawn Tennis Association in 1969 and 1970 (Vice-President the two previous years). The New York Times attributes Martin with having helped to "forge the modern era of the Grand Slam-style game."

He was a champion at Real tennis ("court tennis"), winning the US Amateur Court Tennis singles title eight times (1941, 1950, 1951, 1952, 1953, 1954, 1955, 1956) and the doubles title 13 times (1948, 1949, 1950, 1951, 1953, 1954, 1956, 1957, 1960, 1962, 1966, 1970, 1971).

Alastair graduated from Princeton in 1938. Alastair was also an art collector with a high quality but very eclectic "Guennol Collection", which included the Guennol Stargazer, the Guennol Lioness, and the Hours of Catherine of Cleves - that is to say, one of the two halves into which it was divided in the 19th century, now reunited in the Morgan Library.
