= Alison Nathan =

American judge (born 1972)

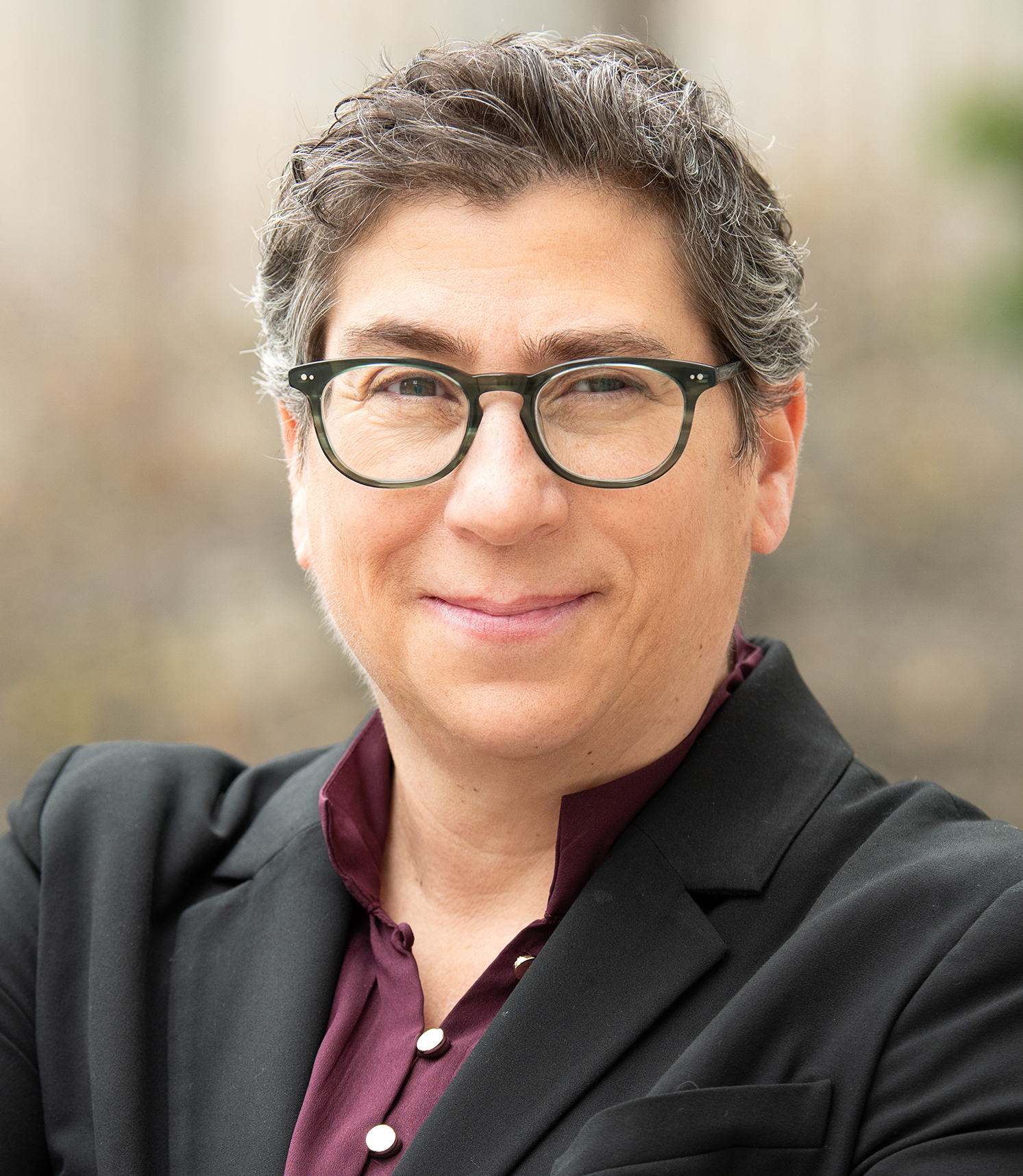
- Nathan in 2024

Judge of the United States Court of Appeals for the Second Circuit
- Incumbent
- Assumed office March 30, 2022
- Appointed by: Joe Biden
- Preceded by: Rosemary S. Pooler

Judge of the United States District Court for the Southern District of New York
- In office October 17, 2011 – March 31, 2022
- Appointed by: Barack Obama
- Preceded by: Sidney H. Stein
- Succeeded by: Arun Subramanian

Personal details
- Born: Alison Julie Nathan; June 18, 1972 (age 54) Philadelphia, Pennsylvania, U.S.
- Spouse: Margaret Satterthwaite
- Education: Cornell University (BA, JD)

Alison Julie Nathan (born June 18, 1972) is an American lawyer who has served as a United States circuit judge of the United States Court of Appeals for the Second Circuit since 2022. She served as a United States district judge of the United States District Court for the Southern District of New York from 2011 to 2022. She previously served as associate White House counsel for President Barack Obama.

== Early life and education ==
Nathan was born on June 18, 1972, in Philadelphia. Nathan was raised in northwest suburban Philadelphia. While at university, Nathan studied philosophy and Japanese.

Nathan earned a Bachelor of Arts degree in 1994 from Cornell University, where she was a member of the Quill and Dagger society. She taught English in Japan from 1994 to 1995, then was an editor of an English-language newspaper in Bangkok from 1995 to 1996. She later attended Cornell Law School, where she was editor-in-chief of the Cornell Law Review. She graduated in 2000 with a Juris Doctor, magna cum laude.

In a New York Times obituary of Judge Deborah Batts, Nathan remembered Batts as an inspiration. Nathan also wrote in a tribute to Justice John Paul Stevens that "When I review work from my law clerks, I will often leave a supportive note like the ones he left me and my co-clerks: 'Nice job. Just a few fly specks.'"

== Career ==
From 2000 until 2001, Nathan served as a law clerk for Ninth Circuit judge Betty Binns Fletcher. From 2001 until 2002, Nathan served as a law clerk for Justice John Paul Stevens of the United States Supreme Court. From 2002 until 2006, Nathan served as an associate in the New York and Washington, D.C. offices of the law firm Wilmer Cutler Pickering Hale and Dorr.

During the 2004 presidential campaign season, she was John Kerry's associate national counsel on the Kerry-Edwards presidential campaign. From 2006 until 2008, Nathan served as a visiting associate professor of law at Fordham University School of Law. Nathan was also a Fritz Alexander fellow at the New York University School of Law from 2008 until 2009. As an Adjunct Professor of Clinical Law at NYU, her academic focus was on "civil procedure, federal courts, habeas, and the constitutionality of the United States death penalty system".

From 2009 until 2010, Nathan served as special assistant to the president and associate White House counsel in the Barack Obama administration. From 2010 until her appointment as a United States district judge, Nathan worked in the New York State Attorney General's Office as a special counsel to the state's Solicitor General, Barbara Underwood.

In 2016, Nathan was a guest judge for Harvard Law School's Ames Moot Court Competition.

== Federal judicial service ==
=== District court service ===
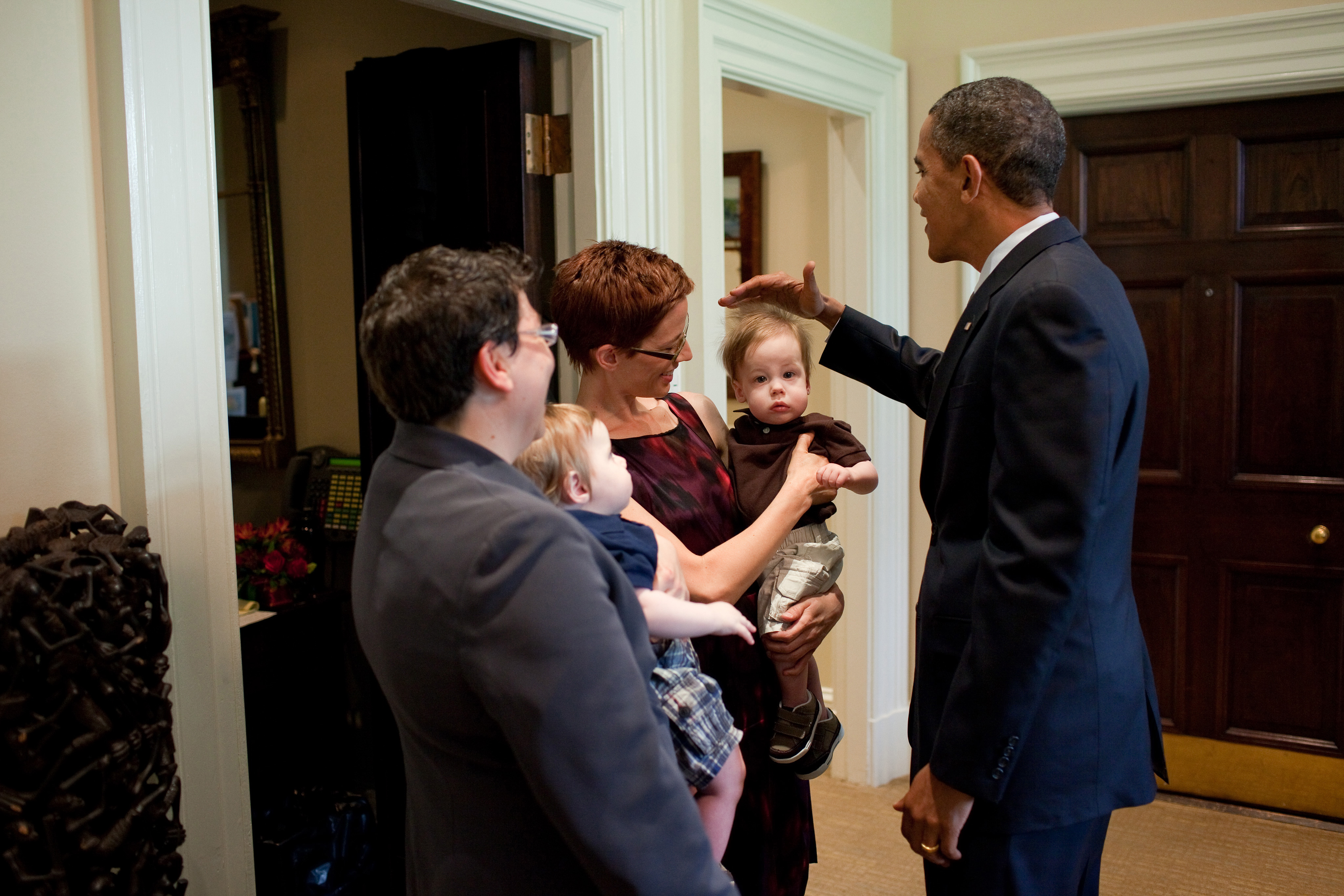
President Barack Obama greets his departing Associate Counsel Alison Nathan (left), Meg Satterthwaite, and their twin sons in the Outer Oval Office, July 7, 2010.

On March 31, 2011, President Barack Obama nominated Nathan to a seat on the United States District Court for the Southern District of New York to replace Judge Sidney H. Stein, who assumed senior status in 2010. Obama made the appointment upon the recommendation of Senator Chuck Schumer. On June 8, 2011, a hearing on her nomination was held before the Senate Judiciary Committee. On July 14, 2011, her nomination was favorably reported by the committee in a 14–4 vote. The United States Senate confirmed her nomination by a 48–44 vote on October 13, 2011. She received her judicial commission four days later. Nathan is recorded as the second openly gay jurist on the federal bench, after Deborah Batts. Since her appointment in 2013, Nathan has supported changes to the clerkship system under what has been known as the Law Clerk Hiring Plan. While on the federal bench, Nathan has been adjunct professor of Clinical Law at the New York University School of Law. Her service on the district court terminated on March 31, 2022, when she was elevated to the court of appeals.

==== Notable cases ====
In 2014, following the U.S. Supreme Court decision in American Broadcasting Cos., Inc. v. Aereo, Inc., Nathan entered a preliminary injunction that blocked Aereo from streaming live TV to devices.

In April 2020, Nathan criticized a Federal Bureau of Prisons practice of putting early released inmates into special COVID-19 quarantines which defied inmates' court-approved early release and the law; Nathan said that such policies were "illogical" and "Kafkaesque". She granted some inmates compassionate release due to the pandemic, allowing them to leave prison early.

In 2020 and 2021, Nathan presided over the bail hearings and trial for Ghislaine Maxwell, who was indicted on federal charges of conspiring and participating with Jeffrey Epstein in the sexual abuse of minors. Nathan ordered Maxwell detained pending trial, denying Maxwell's four bail applications on the ground that she presented a substantial risk of flight. Nathan's rulings were all upheld by the United States Court of Appeals for the Second Circuit. Maxwell was convicted following a jury trial on five sex trafficking-related counts, and in June 2022, Nathan sentenced Maxwell to 20 years' imprisonment.

In 2020, Nathan issued an unusual decision strongly criticizing the U.S. attorney's office in Manhattan, and its leadership, for their handling of the high-profile case of Ali Sadr Hasheminejad. Sadr, a businessman, had been convicted of evading U.S. sanctions against Iran, but the charges were dismissed after prosecutors admitted that the government had failed to make required Brady disclosures of evidence to the defendant and had made misrepresentations to the court. The prosecutor's office said that prosecutors had not "acted in bad faith or intentionally withheld exculpatory information". Nathan wrote, "The manifold problems that have arisen throughout this prosecution — and that may well have gone undetected in countless others — cry out for a coordinated, systemic response from the highest levels of leadership within the United States attorney's office for the Southern District of New York."

In 2021, Nathan presided over a bench trial regarding the ownership of the Guennol Stargazer, a rare idol dating between 4800 and 4100 BCE that likely originated in what is now Turkey's Manisa Province. The Turkish government sued the auction house Christie's and the idol's owner, Michael Steinhardt, alleging that the planned sale of the ancient marble artifact violated a 1906 Ottoman decree. Nathan rejected Turkey's claim, finding that there was insufficient evidence to show the artifact, which had been exhibited in the Metropolitan Museum of Art for decades, had been excavated after 1906. Nathan also held that Turkey's claim was in any case barred by laches, since it had waited too long to pursue its claim.

=== Court of appeals service ===
In 2021, Senator Chuck Schumer recommended Nathan to President Joe Biden for a vacancy on the United States Court of Appeals for the Second Circuit. On November 17, 2021, Biden announced his intent to nominate Nathan to fill the vacancy; her nomination was sent to the Senate the following day. Biden nominated Nathan to the seat being vacated by Judge Rosemary S. Pooler, who announced her intent to assume senior status upon confirmation of her successor. On December 15, 2021, a hearing on her nomination was held before the Senate Judiciary Committee. During her confirmation hearing, Republican senators criticized her decision to grant some prison inmates early release during the COVID-19 pandemic and her prior writings (as a law professor and attorney in private practice) in opposition to the death penalty. On January 3, 2022, her nomination was returned to the President under Rule XXXI, Paragraph 6 of the United States Senate; she was renominated the same day.

On January 20, 2022, her nomination was reported out of committee by a 13–9 vote. On March 14, 2022, Majority Leader Chuck Schumer filed cloture on her nomination. On March 17, 2022, the Senate invoked cloture on her nomination by a 51–44 vote. On March 23, 2022, her nomination was confirmed by a 49–47 vote. She received her judicial commission on March 30, 2022. She became the second openly LGBTQ judge to serve on the 2nd Circuit.

== Personal life ==
Nathan is married to Margaret Satterthwaite, a professor at NYU School of Law. They are parents to twin sons.

Nathan officiated the wedding of fellow district judge J. Paul Oetken in 2014.

== See also ==
- Barack Obama Supreme Court candidates
- Joe Biden Supreme Court candidates
- List of first women lawyers and judges in New York
- List of Jewish American jurists
- List of law clerks for the fourth seat of the Supreme Court of the United States
- List of LGBT jurists in the United States

Legal offices
Preceded by Sidney H. Stein	Judge of the United States District Court for the Southern District of New York; 2011–2022	Succeeded by Arun Subramanian
Preceded by Rosemary S. Pooler	Judge of the United States Court of Appeals for the Second Circuit; 2022–present	Incumbent
