= Sidney H. Stein =

American judge (born 1945)

Senior Judge of the United States District Court for the Southern District of New York
- Incumbent
- Assumed office September 1, 2010

Judge of the United States District Court for the Southern District of New York
- In office March 17, 1995 – September 1, 2010
- Appointed by: Bill Clinton
- Preceded by: Pierre N. Leval
- Succeeded by: Alison Nathan

Personal details
- Born: July 16, 1945 (age 81) Passaic, New Jersey, U.S.
- Education: Princeton University (AB); New York University; Yale University (JD)

Sidney Harold Stein (born July 16, 1945) is a senior United States district judge of the United States District Court for the Southern District of New York.

== Education and career ==
Born in Passaic, New Jersey, Stein was a member of the New York Army National Guard from 1969 to 1975. He received an Artium Baccalaureus degree from Princeton University in 1967 and attended New York University Graduate School of Education before receiving a Juris Doctor from Yale Law School in 1972. While at Yale, Stein was an editor of the Yale Law Journal. He was a law clerk to Judge Stanley Fuld, Chief judge of the New York Court of Appeals from 1972 to 1973. He was in private practice in New York City from 1974 to 1995.

=== Federal judicial service ===
On January 11, 1995, Stein was nominated by President Bill Clinton to a seat on the United States District Court for the Southern District of New York vacated by Pierre N. Leval. Stein was confirmed by the United States Senate on March 17, 1995, and received his commission the same day.

In 2005, Judge Stein found that New York Attorney General Eliot Spitzer’s attempts to investigate national banks was subject to federal preemption by the Office of the Comptroller of the Currency. He assumed senior status on September 1, 2010.

=== Other notable cases ===
Sitting with the Ninth Circuit, in two environmental rulings on February 4, 2022, Stein wrote regarding the Forest Service's commercial "thinning" of areas by cutting down trees. Stein would have ruled against the Forest Service's move to cut down trees in both cases, and his view was prevalent in one.

On March 15, 2024, Stein denied a motion filed by U.S. Senator Bob Menendez seeking dismissal of his corruption charges.

== See also ==
- List of Jewish American jurists

== Sources ==
Legal offices
Preceded by Pierre N. Leval	Judge of the United States District Court for the Southern District of New York; 1995–2010	Succeeded by Alison Nathan
