= List of most expensive sculptures =

This is a list of the highest known prices paid for sculptures.

== Most valuable sculptures ==
Alberto Giacometti's L'Homme au doigt was auctioned for $141.3 million at Christie's in May 2015, the highest price for any sculpture at auction. Giacometti's L'Homme qui marche I had previously achieved the highest price of any sculpture when it was auctioned by Sotheby's in February 2010. Selling for US$104.3 million, it ranks amongst the most valuable works of art.

In 2005, Constantin Brâncuși's Bird in Space broke records when it sold for US$27.5 million. The previous world record was another work by Brâncuși called Danaide, which was sold for US$18.1 million in May 2002. On 18 May 2026 Brâncuși’s Danaïde became the second‑most-expensive sculpture ever, fetching US$107.6 million at Christie’s New York. The 2005 record stood for two years until a highly regarded work of antiquity surpassed the price. Artemis and the Stag, found in the 1920s at a Roman construction site, fetched $28.6 million in June 2007. The record would only stand for a few months, with a work by Pablo Picasso, Tete de femme (Dora Maar), surpassing it by half a million US dollars in November 2007.

In December 2007, the sale of the Guennol Lioness, a statue from around 3000 BC, nearly doubled the previous record price when it sold for $57.2 million. It is the fifth-most valuable sculpture to date (2018) and the most valuable piece from antiquity.

Damien Hirst has claimed that his sculpture For the Love of God, which consists of a platinum cast of a human skull encrusted with 8,601 flawless diamonds, was sold for £50 million (around US$75 million) in August 2007. The truth of this private sale, which was to an unknown consortium, has been called into question. If the sale did take place, For the Love of God would become the second-most expensive sculpture ever sold and would have fetched the highest price for a sculpture by a living artist.

2010 was a good year for record-breaking sculpture prices but it did not continue into 2011. Jeff Koons' porcelain Pink Panther was estimated to fetch a value of up to $30 million, but only achieved just over half that.

Louise Bourgeois holds the record ($32.1 million in 2019) for Spider, the highest price paid for an attributable sculpture by a woman (since the sculptor of Guennol Lioness is unknown).

A Sasanian relief illegally hacked out of living rock in Iran was intended to be sold in a British auction site with an estimated price of $37m, but it was accidentally discovered by security forces.

== Auction details ==
All the most expensive sculptures have been sold by one of two auction houses: Sotheby's and Christie's. Sotheby's has hosted the auctions of the two works that reached the highest price, one in London and the other in New York. Only three of the top ten have auctioned outside of New York; one in London and two in Paris.

The top ten highest value sculptures were made by seven different people, two of whom are unknown and will never be identified. An Alberto Giacometti sculpture is the most valuable modern work, and he has three more entries in the top ten. Four Constantin Brâncuși sculptures are featured on the list, and Jeff Koons' work appears three times. Although Pablo Picasso only appears once he appears numerous times in the list of most expensive paintings.

Several buyers have chosen to remain anonymous, while others publicly celebrate their purchases.

== Most expensive sculpture by a female artist ==
Louise Bourgeois' 1996 Spider is the most expensive sculpture by a woman artist, selling for $32.1 million in 2019.

== List of highest prices paid ==
The highest prices paid for sculptures as of August 2020:

Adjusted price (in millions US)	Original price (in millions US)	Sculpture	Image	Artist	Year	Date of sale	Seller	Buyer	Auction house	Refs
$191.9	$141.3	L'Homme au doigt		Alberto Giacometti	1947	11 May 2015	Sheldon Solow	Private collection	Christie's, New York	
$107.6	$107.6	Danaide		Constantin Brâncuși	1913	18 May 2026	Estate of S. I. Newhouse	Private collection	Christie's, New York	
$154	$104.3	L'Homme qui marche I		Alberto Giacometti	1961	3 February 2010	Commerzbank	Lily Safra	Sotheby's, London	
$137.4	$101.0	Chariot		Alberto Giacometti	1950	4 November 2014		Steven A. Cohen	Sotheby's, New York	
$114.7	$91.1	Rabbit (Note: Most expensive sculpture by a living artist)		Jeff Koons	1986	15 May 2019	Estate of S. I. Newhouse	Steven A. Cohen (via Robert Mnuchin)	Christie's, New York	
$91	$71	La jeune fille sophistiquée (Portrait de Nancy Cunard)		Constantin Brâncuși	1928-1932	15 May 2018	Elizabeth Stafford	Private collection	Christie's, New York	
$96.2	$70.7	Tête		Amedeo Modigliani	1911-1912	4 November 2014			Sotheby's, New York	
$87.8	$59.5	Tête		Amedeo Modigliani	1910–1912	14 June 2010	Gaston Levy	Private collection	Christie's, Paris	
$80.7	$58.4	Balloon Dog (Orange)		Jeff Koons	1994–2000	12 November 2013	Private collection	Private collection	Christie's, New York	
$75.3	$57.3	La muse endormie		Constantin Brâncuși	1913	15 May 2017	Jacques Ulmann	Private collection	Christie's, New York	
$88.8	$57.2	Guennol Lioness		Unknown	c.3000 BC	5 December 2007	Alastair Bradley Martin	Private collection	Sotheby's, New York	
$78.7	$53.3	Grande tête mince		Alberto Giacometti	1955	4 May 2010	Sidney F. Brody	Private collection	Christie's, New York	
$69.1	$50.0	Grand tête mince (Grand tête de Diego)		Alberto Giacometti	1955	6 November 2013	Private collection	Bill Acquavella	Sotheby's, New York	
$72	$48.8	Nu de dos, 4 état (Back IV)		Henri Matisse	1958	3 November 2010	Private collection	Private collection	Christie's, New York	
$56.4	$37.6	Madame LR (Portrait de Mme LR)		Constantin Brâncuși	1914–17	24 February 2009	Yves Saint Laurent and Pierre Bergé	Private collection	Christie's, Paris	
$46	$33.8	Jim Beam J.b. Turner Train		Jeff Koons	1986	31 May 2014			Christie's, New York	
$47.3	$33.7	Tulips		Jeff Koons	1995-2004	14 November 2012			Christie's, New York	
$40.4	$32.1	Spider		Louise Bourgeois	1996	15 May 2019			Christie's, New York	
$42.1	$31	Winged Genius		Unknown	c. 883 - 859 B.C.	31 October 2018	Virginia Theological Seminary	Private collection	Christie's, New York	
$42.2	$30.1	Reclining Figure: Festival		Henry Moore	1951	30 June 2016	Private collection	Private collection	Christie's, London	
$51.1	$29.1	Tete de femme (Dora Maar)		Pablo Picasso	1941	7 November 2007	Private collection	Franck Giraud	Sotheby's, New York	
$44.4	$28.6	Artemis and the Stag		Unknown	c.100 BC – 100 AD	7 June 2007	Albright-Knox Art Gallery	Private collection	Sotheby's, New York	
$38.4	$28.2	Popeye		Jeff Koons	2009 - 2011	14 May 2014			Sotheby's, New York	
$45.3	$27.5	Bird in Space		Constantin Brâncuși	1922–1923	5 May 2005	Private collection	Private collection	Christie's, New York	
$41.1	$27.5	Grande Femme Debout II		Alberto Giacometti	1961	6 May 2008			Christie's, New York	

== See also ==
- List of most expensive paintings
- List of most expensive photographs
- List of most expensive artworks by living artists
- List of most expensive books and manuscripts
- List of most expensive non-fungible tokens
