= L'Homme qui marche I =

Sculpture by Alberto Giacometti

- The Walking Man I or The Striding Man I (English)
- Artist: Alberto Giacometti
- Year: 1960
- Type: Bronze
- Dimensions: 183 cm (72 in)
- Location: Carnegie Museum of Art, Pittsburgh Private collection of Lily Safra Fondation Maeght, Saint-Paul Albright-Knox Art Gallery, Buffalo Louisiana Museum of Modern Art, Humlebæk Tehran Museum of Contemporary Arts, Tehran, Kröller-Müller Museum

L’Homme qui marche I ([lɔm ki maʁʃ œ̃] The Walking Man I or The Striding Man I, lit. 'The Man who Walks I') is the name of any one of the cast bronze sculptures that comprise six numbered editions plus four artist proofs created by Swiss sculptor Alberto Giacometti in 1961. On 3 February 2010, the second edition of the cast of the sculpture became one of the most expensive works of art ever sold at auction, for $104.3 million ($153.99 million in 2025). Its price meant it was considered the most expensive sculpture, until May 2015, when another Giacometti work, L'Homme au doigt, surpassed it.

== The sculpture ==
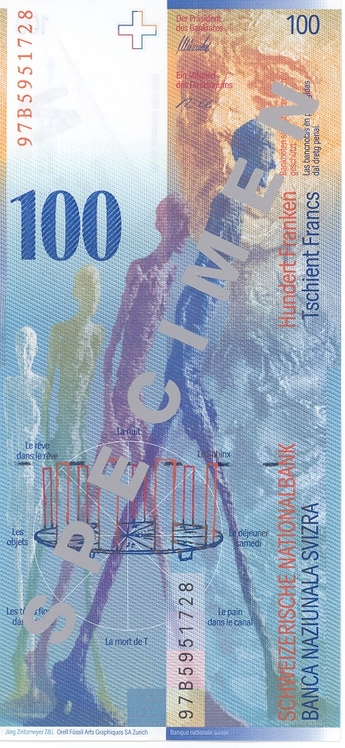
Four views of L'Homme qui marche I depicted on the 1998 version of the 100 Swiss franc banknote

The bronze sculpture depicts a lone man in mid-stride with his arms hanging at his side. The piece is described as "both a humble image of an ordinary man, and a potent symbol of humanity". Giacometti is said to have viewed "the natural equilibrium of the stride" as a symbol of "man's own life force".

In 1960, Giacometti was asked to be part of a public project by the Chase Manhattan Plaza in New York to plant bronze figures outside the building. He created several sculptures, with L'Homme qui marche I among them. Giacometti struggled with the project and eventually abandoned the commission. However, in 1961 he cast the life-size work in bronze and exhibited it at the Venice Biennale a year later. L'Homme qui marche I was created at the high point of Giacometti's mature period and represents the pinnacle of his experimentation with the human form. The piece is considered to be one of the most important works by the artist and one of the most iconic images of Modern art.

Edition number one of the sculpture is located at the Carnegie Museum of Art in Pittsburgh, Pennsylvania. Edition number two belongs in a private collection. Other casts of L'Homme qui marche I include those at the Fondation Maeght in Saint-Paul, Alpes-Maritimes, the Kröller-Müller Museum in the Netherlands, the Albright-Knox Art Gallery in Buffalo, NY, The Tehran Museum of Contemporary Art In Iran and Louisiana Museum of Modern Art near Copenhagen, Denmark.

== Auction ==
L'Homme qui marche II, a closely related sculpture in the series

On 3 February 2010, edition number two of the sculpture came up for auction at Sotheby's auction house in London. The piece was sold by German banking group Commerzbank, which had acquired it when it took over the Dresdner Bank in 2009. The sale of the sculpture marked the first time in 20 years that a life-size Giacometti figure of a walking man came to auction. It had been estimated to sell for between £12 and £18 million, but in just eight minutes the sculpture was bought by Lily Safra, widow of the prominent Lebanese banker Edmond Safra for £58 million. Including the buyer's premium the price reached £65 million (US$103.7 million, $153.1 million in 2025).

The piece broke the record for a Giacometti work at auction, which was set at $27.5 million by Grande Femme Debout II in 2008, and that for the most expensive sculpture sold at a public auction, which was held by the 5000-year-old Guennol Lioness, sold at Sotheby's in 2007 for $57.2 m. When expressed in British pounds and when inflation is ignored, the bronze also broke the record price for an art work sold at auction which, since 2004, was held at $104.2 million (then £58.2 m) by Pablo Picasso's Garçon à la pipe. The most expensive work of art sold at a public auction remained Van Gogh's Portrait of Dr. Gachet, which was bought in May 1990 for $82.5 million (approx. $138.4 million in CPI-adjusted 2010 US dollars), while Jackson Pollock's No. 5, 1948, which was privately sold for $140 million in 2006 (approx. $151 million in 2010 dollars), remained the most expensive work of art sold overall.

== See also ==
- List of most expensive sculptures
