= 2015 Al Khalis prison break =

Terrorist incident in Iraq

On 8 May 2015, a prison break occurred in the Iraqi town of Al Khalis. More than fifty prisoners escaped in the break, including nine who had been facing terrorism charges. An estimated fifty other prisoners and twelve police officers died in the prison break.

== Background ==
Al Khalis is a town located in Diyala province, 50 miles (80 km) north of Baghdad. The town's prison held about 300 people convicted on terror charges. The area has seen significant violence in recent years as the Islamic State of Iraq and the Levant (ISIL) has battled the Iraqi military for control of the region. Since June 2014, three prison breaks have occurred in Diyala.

== Cause ==
There are two accounts of what took place during the break. According to official reports, a riot broke out at the prison. A prisoner then escaped after seizing weapons from the guards who intervened to stop the riot. The prisoners then captured the prison's armory, which they used to escape. A police officer eyewitness backed this account of events. Brigadier General Saad Maan Ibrahim also attributed the jailbreak to an internal riot.

ISIS, however, claimed the prison break was a coordinated effort between its members on the outside and the inside. Messages posted on ISIS social media said that improvised bombs blew up military and security vehicles near the prison while prisoners on the inside took control of the guard's weapon stock. According to Amaq News Agency, which supports ISIL, ISIL militants broke into the prison with the help of explosives, with the aim of freeing inmates and accessing the prison's weapons stores. Amaq also stated that there were thirty ISIS members among those who escaped, and that about sixty militants were killed by Shi'ite militiamen in ensuing clashes. Oudi Al-Khadran, the mayor of Al Khalis, blamed ISIS for "the killings and the release of ISIS prisoners." Colonel Ahmed al-Timimi, head of the Diyala province security force, also attributed the break to ISIS. Official reports said no external attack had occurred on the prison, although some local sources reported seeing ISIS vehicles attempting to storm it.

== Aftermath ==
More than fifty prisoners escaped in the prison break. Of those, nine were being held on terrorism charges and the rest were common criminals, according to official reports. ISIS, however, claimed to have freed "more than 30" militants. An estimated fifty prisoners and twelve police officers died in the fighting. A curfew has been imposed in Al Khalis, and houses in the area are being searched for suspects.

At the same time as the prison break, a series of suicide attacks in Diyala killed at least 22 people. It is unclear if the attacks, which targeted Shia places of worship, were related to the break.
