= Guennol Lioness =

5000-year-old Proto-Elamite statue

- Artist: Unknown sculptor of the Proto-Elamite culture
- Year: c. 3000–2800 BC
- Type: Limestone
- Dimensions: 8.3 cm (3.25 in)
- Location: Private collection

The Guennol Lioness [ˈɡwɛnɔl] is a 5,000-year-old Mesopotamian statue allegedly found near Baghdad, Iraq. Depicting a muscular anthropomorphic leonine-human, it sold for $57.2 million at Sotheby's auction house on December 5, 2007. The sculpture had been acquired by a private collector, Alastair Bradley Martin, in 1948 from the collection of Joseph Brummer, and had been on display at Brooklyn Museum of Art in New York City from that time to its sale in 2007. It is called "Guennol" after the Welsh name for "Martin", the name of the collector. In 1950 Edith Porada described it as a lioness "because of the feminine curves of her lower body and the absence of male organs" while conceding the possibility "that the figure represented a sexless creature".

At the time of its 2007 sale, the price paid at auction for The Guennol Lioness was the highest paid for a sculpture to that date, easily exceeding the record of Pablo Picasso's Tete de femme (Dora Maar). On 3 February 2010, however, the second edition of the cast of the sculpture L'Homme qui marche I (Walking Man I) by Alberto Giacometti sold for £65,001,250 ($104,327,006) and surpassed The Guennol Lioness as the most expensive sculpture ever sold at auction.

The limestone sculpture measures just over 8 cm (3.25 in) tall. It was described by Sotheby's as "one of the last known masterworks from the dawn of civilization remaining in private hands." One day before the auction, experts had been estimating that the highest bid would be between $14 million and $18 million. The sale price of the lioness-woman exceeded the $28.6 million paid for Artemis and the Stag, a 2,000-year-old bronze figure that Sotheby's also sold in New York during June 2007 and which then held the record for the most expensive antiquity to be sold at auction.

== History ==
According to Sotheby's, the sculpture was "said to have been found at a site near Baghdad", and had reached New York by 1931. It was on loan to the Brooklyn Museum of Art from 1948 until it was purchased at auction by an English collector. It is thought to have been created at approximately the same time as the first known use of the wheel, the development of cuneiform writing, and the emergence of the first cities.

== Context ==
Such anthropomorphic figures, merging animal and human features, can be seen in the top and bottom registers of the trapezoidal front panel of the famous Great Lyre from the "King's Grave" (circa 2650–2550 BC), discovered by British archaeologist Sir Leonard Woolley early in the twentieth century at Ur in present-day Iraq.

Many ancient Near East deities were represented in anthropomorphic figures. Such images evoked the Mesopotamian belief in attaining power over the physical world by combining the superior physical attributes of various species. It is possible that the nearby Sumerians borrowed this powerful artistic hybrid from the Proto-Elamites. The lioness was the frequent subject of veneration among cultures with exposure to the characteristic hunting techniques of the species, which feature well-coordinated hunting by its female members.

== See also ==
- List of most expensive sculptures
