= L'Homme au doigt =

Sculpture by Alberto Giacometti

- Man Pointing or Pointing Man (English)
- Artist: Alberto Giacometti
- Year: 1947
- Type: Bronze
- Dimensions: 180 cm (70 in)

L'Homme au doigt ([lɔm o dwa], "The Man with the Finger"; also called Pointing Man or Man Pointing) is a 1947 bronze sculpture by Alberto Giacometti, that became the most expensive sculpture ever when it sold for US$141.3 million on May 11, 2015. It was later revealed to be owned by New York Mets owner and billionaire hedge fund manager Steve Cohen.

Giacometti made six casts of the work plus one artist's proof. Pointing Man is in the collections of New York's Museum of Modern Art, London's Tate museums, the Des Moines Art Center, and Glenstone. One of the others is also in a museum, and the rest are in foundation collections or owned privately.

L’homme au doigt sold for $126 million, or $141.3 million with fees, in Christie's 11 May 2015 Looking Forward to the Past sale in New York, a record for a sculpture at auction. The work had been in Sheldon Solow's private collection for 45 years. According to Giacometti, he created the sculpture in a time crunch for a show's deadline, describing it being made “in one night between midnight and nine the next morning”.

Christie's called it a "rare masterpiece", and "Giacometti’s most iconic and evocative sculpture", and estimated that it would sell "in the region of $130 million". Christie's also noted that the cast in their auction is believed to be the only one that Giacometti "painted by hand in order to heighten its expressive impact".

Another Giacometti work, L'Homme qui marche I, had also been the most expensive sculpture ever sold at auction, when it sold for £65 million (US$104.3 million) at Sotheby's, London on 3 February 2010.

== Description ==
L'Homme au doigt is a bronze sculpture depicting a slender figure measuring nearly 6 feet (1.8 m) tall with its index finger extending. This is also called the pointing man.

== See also ==
- List of most expensive sculptures
