= List of companies of Thailand =

Location of Thailand

Thailand is a country at the centre of the Indochinese peninsula in Southeast Asia. The Thai economy is the world's 20th largest by GDP at PPP and the 27th largest by nominal GDP. It became a newly industrialised country and a major exporter in the 1990s. Manufacturing, agriculture, and tourism are leading sectors of the economy. The economy is heavily export-dependent, with exports accounting for more than two-thirds of gross domestic product (GDP). Thailand exports over US$105 billion worth of goods and services annually.

Substantial industries include electric appliances, components, computer components, and vehicles. Thailand's recovery from the 1997–1998 Asian financial crisis depended mainly on exports, among various other factors. As of 2012, the Thai automotive industry was the largest in Southeast Asia and the 9th largest in the world. The Thailand industry has an annual output of near 1.5 million vehicles, mostly commercial vehicles.

For further information on the types of business entities in this country and their abbreviations, see "Business entities in Thailand".

== Largest firms ==
This list shows firms in the Fortune Global 500, which ranks firms by total revenues reported before 31 March 2017. Only the top five firms (if available) are included as a sample.

Rank	Image	Name	2016 revenues (US$M)	Employees	Notes
192		PTT Public Company Limited	48,719	24,934	State-owned oil and gas conglomerate providing exploration, refining, power generation and gasoline retailing. Subsidiaries include PTT Exploration and Production, PTT Global Chemical, Thai Oil, IRPC and Cove Energy plc.

== Notable firms ==
This list includes companies with headquarters in Thailand. The industry and sector follow the Industry Classification Benchmark taxonomy. Organizations which have ceased operations are included and noted as defunct.

Active firms
State-owned firms
Defunct firms

Name	Industry	Sector	Headquarters	Founded	Notes
108 Shop	Consumer services	Retail	Bangkok	2004	Convenience store chain
2Spot Communications	Consumer services	Media	Bangkok	2004	Animation character design
3K Battery	Industrials	General industries	Bangkok	1986	Automotive battery, defunct 2017
Advanced Info Service	Telecommunications	Mobile telecommunications	Bangkok	1986	Mobile phone service provider
Air Andaman	Consumer services	Travel & leisure	Bangkok	2000	Airline, defunct 2004
Air People International	Industrials	Industrial transportation	Bangkok	1986	Cargo airline
Airports of Thailand PCL	Industrials	Industrial transportation	Bangkok	1979	Airports operator
Aksorn Education	Education	Publishing	Bangkok	1935	Textbook publisher
Angel Air	Consumer services	Travel & leisure	Bangkok	1998	Airline, defunct 2003
Areeya Property	Financials	Real estate	Bangkok	2000	Real estate development
AsiaSoft	Technology	Software	Bangkok	2001	Video games
AutoAlliance Thailand	Consumer goods	Automobiles	Bangkok	1995	Automotive assembly
B.Grimm	Conglomerates	-	Bangkok	1878	Energy, Cooling, Healthcare, Real Estate, Internet
Bangkok Airways	Consumer services	Travel & leisure	Bangkok	1968	Aviation
Bangkok Bank	Financials	Banks	Bangkok	1944	Banking, financial services
Bangkok Dock Company	Industrials	Industrial transportation	Bangkok	1957	Shipbuilding
Bangkok Hospital	Health care	Health care providers	Bangkok	1972	Hospital
Bangkok Insurance	Financials	Insurance	Bangkok	1947	Insurance
Bangkok Land	Financials	Real estate	Bangkok	1973	Property holding
Bangkok Post	Consumer services	Media	Bangkok	1946	Newspaper
Bank of Ayudhya	Financials	Banks	Bangkok	1945	Banking, financial services
Banpu	Utilities	Electricity	Bangkok	1983	Electric utility
Besins Healthcare	Health care	Pharmaceuticals	Bangkok	1885	Pharmaceuticals
Big C	Consumer services	Retail	Bangkok	1993	Grocery and general retail
BMW Manufacturing (Thailand)	Consumer goods	Automobiles	Rayong	1998	Automobile, part of BMW (Geramany)
Bongkoch Publishing	Consumer services	Media	Bangkok	2003	Publishing
Boon Rawd Brewery	Consumer goods	Food & beverage	Bangkok	1933	Brewery, soft drinks
BTS Group Holdings	Industrials	Industrial transportation	Bangkok	1968	Mass transportation
Bumrungrad International Hospital	Health care	Health care providers	Bangkok	1980	Hospital
CAT Telecom	Telecommunications	Fixed line telecommunications	Bangkok	2003	Telecom, defunct 2021
CDG Group	Technology	Computer hardware	Bangkok	1968	Information technology, peripherals
Central Group	Conglomerates	-	Bangkok	1947	Retail, hotels, property development
Central Pattana	Consumer services	Retail	Bangkok	1980	Retail, part of Central Group
Chaiseri	Industrials	Defense	Bangkok	1939	Military vehicles, arms
Channel 7	Consumer services	Media	Bangkok	1967	Broadcasting
Charoen Pokphand Foods	Consumer goods	Food & beverage	Bangkok	1978	Agribusiness, part of Charoen Pokphand
Charoen Pokphand	Conglomerates	-	Bangkok	1921	Retail, agribusiness, telecommunications
Christiani & Nielsen	Industrials	Construction & materials	Bangkok	1904	Construction
Chue Chin Hua	Consumer goods	Household goods	Phra Pradaeng	1936	Cookware
Coca Steamboat	Consumer services	Restaurants & bars	Bangkok	1957	Restaurant chain
CP All	Consumer services	Retail	Bangkok	1988	Retail, part of Charoen Pokphand
CTH	Telecommunications	Fixed line telecommunications	Bangkok	2009	Cable broadband, defunct 2016
Daily News	Consumer services	Media	Bangkok	1964	Newspaper
Deestone Group	Consumer goods	Tires	Samut Sakhon	1977	Tires
Deves Insurance	Financials	Insurance	Bangkok	1947	Insurance
Diana Department Store	Consumer services	Retail	Hat Yai	UNKNOWN	Department store chain
DTAC	Telecommunications	Mobile telecommunications	Bangkok	1989	Telecom, mobile phones
Dusit Thani Group	Consumer services	Travel & leisure	Bangkok	1948	Hospitality
Dutch Mill	Consumer goods	Food & beverage	Bangkok	1984	Dairy
Electricity Generating Authority of Thailand	Utilities	Electricity	Bangkok	1969	Electric utility
Ensogo	Technology	Internet	Bangkok	2010	Electronic commerce, defunct 2016
FazWaz	Financials	Real Estate	Bangkok	2015	Real Estate PropTech
FBT	Consumer goods	Personal goods	Bangkok	1952	Sportswear, sport equipment
Five Star Production	Consumer services	Media	Bangkok	1973	Motion pictures
GDH 559	Consumer services	Media	Bangkok	2016	Motion pictures
Glow Energy	Utilities	Electricity	Bangkok	1993	Electric utility
GMM Grammy	Consumer services	Media	Bangkok	1983	Media conglomerate
Grand Sport Group	Consumer goods	Personal goods	Bangkok	1961	Sportswear, sport equipment
Goldensafe	Consumer goods	Security & Fireproof Goods	Bangkok	1969	Safe, Vault, Steel Furnitures
I-Mobile	Consumer services	Retail	Bangkok	1995	Mobile phone retailer, part of Samart Group, defunct 2017
Index Living Mall	Consumer services	Retail	Bangkok	2002	Furniture retailer
Indorama Ventures	Consumer goods	Personal goods	Bangkok	1994	Polyester, yarn
International Engineering Public Company Limited	Industrials	Industrial engineering	Bangkok	1922	Engineering
Intouch Holdings	Conglomerates	-	Bangkok	1983	Media, telecommunications, aviation, advertising, finance
Italthai Industrial Group	Industrials	Industrial transportation	Bangkok	1964	Construction, shipbuilding
Jamsai	Consumer services	Media	Bangkok	2002	Publishing
Kalara International Properties	Consumer services	Travel & leisure	Ko Samui	2003	Tourism-oriented property development
Kantana Group	Consumer services	Media	Bangkok	1951	Film and television production
Karmarts	Consumer goods	Personal goods	Bangkok	1982	Cosmetics
Kasikornbank	Financials	Banks	Bangkok	1945	Banking, financial services
Khon Kaen Sugar	Consumer goods	Food & beverage	Bangkok	1945	Sugar
Kiatnakin Bank	Financials	Banks	Bangkok	1971	Banking, financial services
King Power	Consumer services	Travel & leisure	Bangkok	1989	Travel retail
Krung Thai Bank	Financials	Banks	Bangkok	1966	State-owned banking
Kulthorn Kirby	Industrials	General industries	Bangkok	1980	Manufacturing
Land and Houses	Financials	Real estate	Bangkok	1983	Real estate
Lebua Hotels & Resorts	Consumer services	Travel & leisure	Bangkok	2003	Hospitality
Major Cineplex	Consumer services	Travel & leisure	Bangkok	1995	Theater chain
MBK Center	Consumer services	Retail	Bangkok	1985	Shopping mall
MCOT	Consumer services	Media	Bangkok	1952	State broadcasting
Minor Hotels	Consumer services	Travel & leisure	Bangkok	1978	Hotels, part of Minor International
Minor International	Conglomerates	-	Bangkok	1978	Food, hotels, retailing
Mitr Phol	Consumer goods	Food & beverage	Bangkok	1946	Sugar
Mitsubishi Motors (Thailand)	Consumer goods	Automobiles	Pathum Thani	1987	Automobile, part of Mitsubishi Motors (Japan)
Modernform Group	Consumer goods	Personal goods	Bangkok	1980	Furniture manufacturer
Muang Thai Life Assurance	Financials	Insurance	Bangkok	1951	Life insurance
Mu Space	Technology	Aerospace	Bangkok	2017	Satellite, IoT, space tourism
Nation Multimedia Group	Consumer services	Media	Bangkok	1971	Media group
NBT	Consumer services	Media	Bangkok	1985	State broadcasting
National Telecom	Telecommunications	Fixed line telecommunications	Bangkok	2021	State telecom
Nok Air	Consumer services	Travel & leisure	Bangkok	2004	Aviation
One-Two-GO Airlines	Consumer services	Travel & leisure	Bangkok	2003	Low-cost airline, merged into Orient Thai Airlines in 2010
Orient Thai Airlines	Consumer services	Travel & leisure	Bangkok	1995	Aviation, defunct 2018
Osotspa	Consumer goods	Food & beverage	Bangkok	1891	Beverage
Pace Development	Financials	Real estate	Bangkok	2004	Real estate
PBair	Consumer services	Travel & leisure	Bangkok	1990	Airline, defunct 2009
Phranakorn film	Consumer services	Media	Bangkok	2001	Film production
Phuket Air	Consumer services	Travel & leisure	Bangkok	1999	Aviation, defunct 2012
Phyathai Hospitals Group	Health care	Health care providers	Bangkok	1976	Hospital group
Priceza	Technology	Internet	Bangkok	2010	Web services
Prinsiri	Financials	Real estate	Bangkok	2000	Real estate development
PTT	Oil & gas	Oil & gas producers	Bangkok	1978	State petroleum
Raimon Land	Financials	Real estate	Bangkok	1987	Real estate developer
Real United	Consumer goods	Personal goods	Samut Sakhon	2014	Sportswear, sport equipment
Roojai Insurance	Financials	Insurance	Bangkok	1948	General insurance
Rose Media and Entertainment	Consumer services	Media	Bangkok	1986	Media production
Royal Cliff Hotels Group	Consumer services	Travel & leisure	Pattaya	1973	Hospitality
RS Public Company Limited	Consumer services	Media	Bangkok	1976	Media group
Sahamongkol Film International	Consumer services	Media	Bangkok	1970	Motion pictures
Sahaviriya Steel Industries	Basic materials	Basic resources	Bangkok	1990	Steel
Samart Group	Conglomerates	-	Bangkok	1955	Consumer electronics, telecommunications
Sansiri	Financials	Real estate	Bangkok	1984	Real estate development
Seacon Square	Consumer services	Retail	Bangkok	1994	Shopping mall
SF Group	Consumer services	Travel & leisure	Bangkok	1999	Entertainment
Siam Cement	Industrials	Construction & materials	Bangkok	1913	Cement, packaging, chemicals
Siam Commercial Bank	Financials	Banks	Bangkok	1907	Commercial banking
Siam Piwat	Consumer services	Retail	Bangkok	1958	Retail center
Silkspan	Technology	Software	Bangkok	2000	Web services
Software Park Thailand	Financials	Financial services	Pak Kret	1999	Technology investments
Starmark	Consumer goods	Household goods	Bangkok	1982	Furniture
State Railway of Thailand	Industrials	Railroads	Bangkok	1890	State railway
Sukosol Group	Consumer services	Travel & leisure	Bangkok	1970	Hospitality group
Tanin Industrial Company	Consumer goods	Leisure goods	Bangkok	1946	Consumer electric device
Tao Kae Noi	Consumer goods	Food & beverage	Bangkok	2004	Snack foods
Tero Entertainment	Consumer services	Media	Bangkok	2020	Entertainment, concerts
Thai Air Cargo	Industrials	Industrial transportation	Bangkok	2004	Cargo airline, defunct 2006
Thai AirAsia	Consumer services	Travel & leisure	Bangkok	2003	Aviation
Thai Airways	Consumer services	Travel & leisure	Bangkok	1960	State aviation
Thai Aviation Industries	Industrials	Defense	Bangkok	2003	Military aircraft maintenance
Thai Express	Consumer services	Restaurants & bars	Bangkok	2002	Restaurants, part of Minor International
Thai Life Insurance	Financials	Insurance	Bangkok	1942	Life insurance, financial services
Thai Oil	Oil & gas	Oil & gas producers	Bangkok	1961	Petroleum
Thai Pacific Airlines	Consumer services	Travel & leisure	Bangkok	2003	Airline, defunct 2004
Thai President Foods	Consumer goods	Food & beverage	Bangkok	1972	Noodles
Thai Public Broadcasting Service	Consumer services	Media	Bangkok	1996	State broadcasting
Thai Rath	Consumer services	Media	Bangkok	1962	Newspaper
Thai Rating and Information Services	Financials	Financial services	Bangkok	1993	Credit ratings
Thai Rubber Latex Corporation	Industrials	General industries	Samut Prakan	1985	Latex
Thai Rung Union Car	Consumer goods	Automobiles	Bangkok	1967	Automobiles
Thai Summit Group	Industrials	General industries	Samut Prakan	1977	Manufacturing
Thai Union Group	Consumer goods	Food & beverage	Samut Sakhon	1977	Frozen and canned seafood
ThaiBev	Consumer goods	Food & beverage	Bangkok	2003	Beverages
Thaicom	Telecommunications	Fixed line telecommunications	Nonthaburi	1991	Telecom
Thailand Post	Industrials	Delivery services	Bangkok	1883	Postal service
ThaiJet	Consumer services	Travel & leisure	Bangkok	2003	Airline, defunct 2004
Thanachart Bank	Financials	Banks	Bangkok	2002	Banking, financial services
The Brooker Group	Financials	Financial services	Bangkok	1994	Banking, financial services
The Cabin Chiang Mai	Health care	Health care providers	Chiang Mai	2009	Rehab facility
The Erawan Group	Conglomerates	-	Bangkok	1982	Shopping centers, hotels, department stores
The Mall Group	Consumer services	Retail	Bangkok	1981	Malls, movie theaters
The Pizza Company	Consumer services	Retail	Bangkok	1980	Pizza, part of Minor International
The Treedom Group	Consumer goods	Food & beverage	Bangkok	2006	Agricultural
Tisco Bank	Financials	Banks	Bangkok	1969	Banking
TL Tradewinds	Consumer goods	Food & beverage	Surin	2011	Food processing
TMB Bank	Financials	Banks	Bangkok	1957	Banking
Tonson Group	Financials	Financial services	Bangkok	2006	Diversified investment
TOT	Telecommunications	Fixed line telecommunications	Bangkok	1954	Telecom, defunct 2021
Toyota Motor Thailand	Consumer goods	Automobiles	Samut Prakan	1962	Automobile, part of Toyota (Japan)
TPI Polene	Industrials	Construction & materials	Bangkok	1987	Cement
True Corporation	Telecommunications	Mobile telecommunications	Bangkok	1990	Telecom, mobile phones
UBIS	Basic materials	Chemicals	Bangkok	1997	Chemicals
Wellcom	Technology	Telecommunications equipment	Bangkok	UNKNOWN	Mobile phones
Workpoint Entertainment	Consumer services	Media	Pathum Thani	1989	Media
Yan Wal Yun	Consumer goods	Food & beverage	Bangkok	1947	Food processing

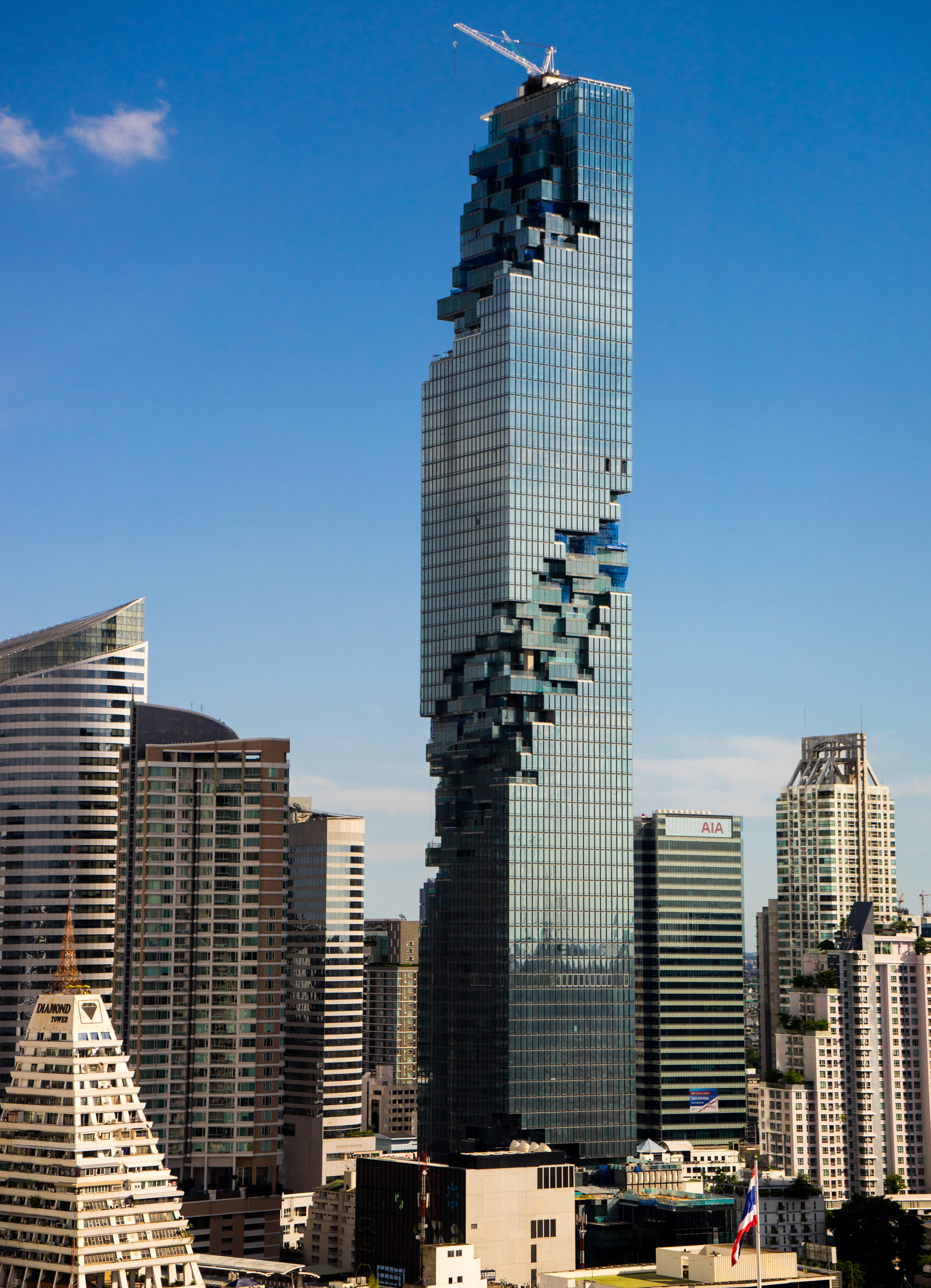
The MahaNakhon tower in the Bang Rak District.

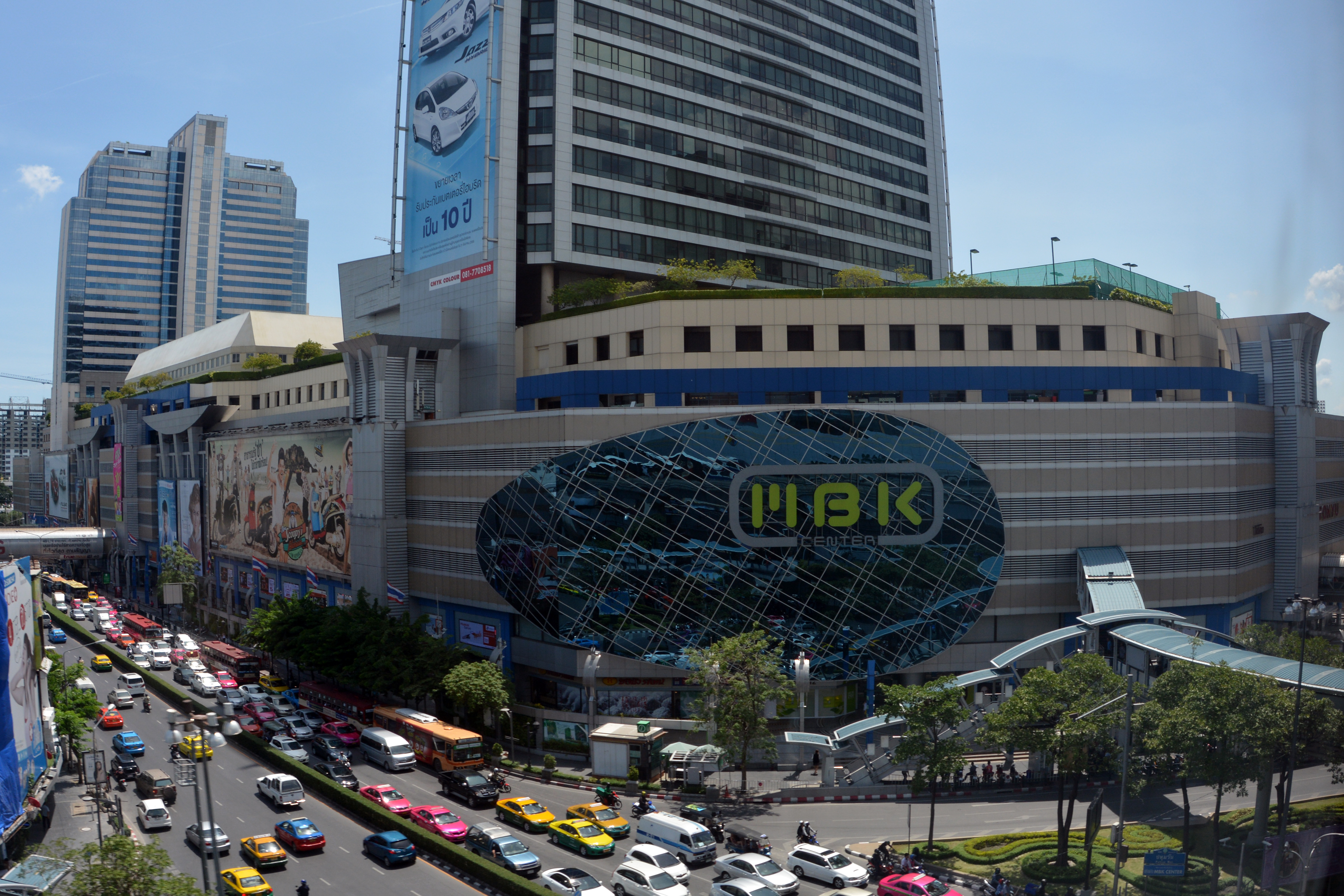
MBK Center, and eight story mall in Bangkok.

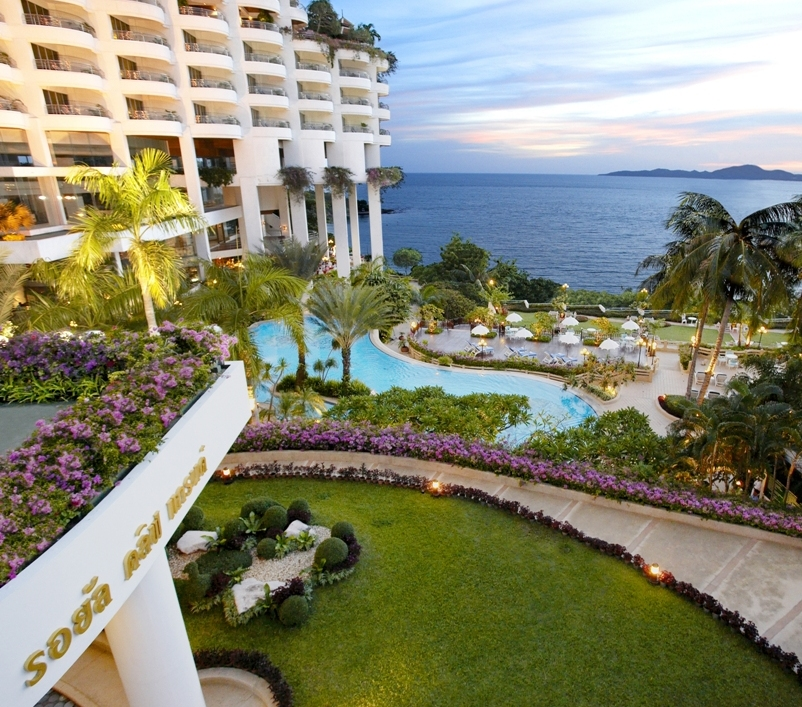
Royal Cliff Grand Hotel in Pattaya.

== See also ==
- Media of Thailand
- Stock Exchange of Thailand
- Economy of Thailand
