= SET Index =

Thai stock market index

SET INDEX
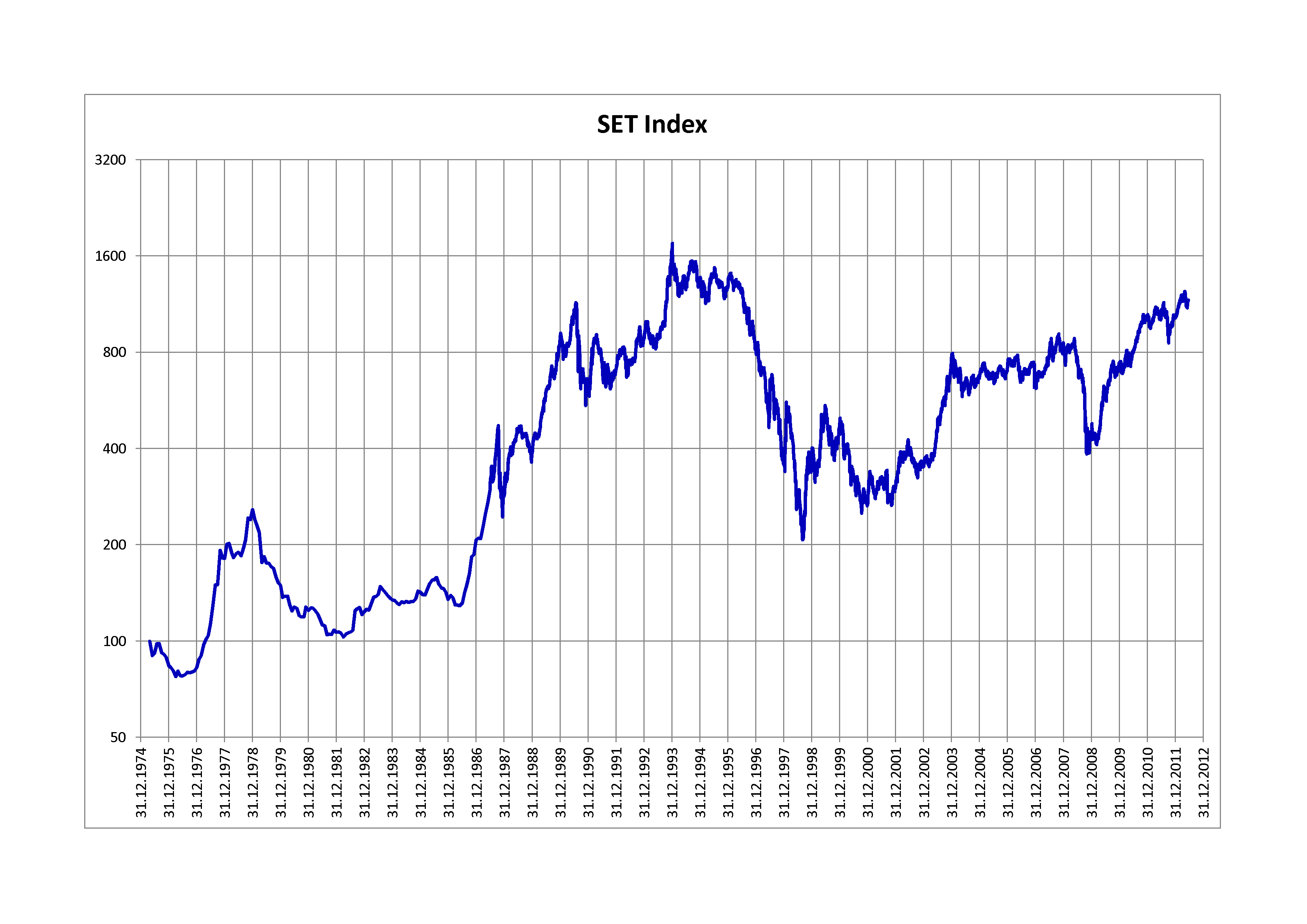
- SET Index performance between 1975 and 2012
- Foundation: April 30, 1975
- Operator: Stock Exchange of Thailand
- Exchanges: Stock Exchange of Thailand
- Constituents: 545 (2011)
- Market cap: BT฿ 15.388 trillion (2017)
- Weighting method: Capitalization-weighted
- Related indices: SET50 Index and SET100 Index
- Website: www.set.or.th

The SET Index is a Thai composite stock market index calculated by the prices of all common stocks (including unit trusts of property funds) on the main board of the Stock Exchange of Thailand (SET), except for stocks that have been suspended for more than one year. It is a market capitalization-weighted price index which compares the current market value of all listed common shares with its value on the base date of April 30, 1975, when the Index was established and set at 100 points.

The formula of calculation is as follows:

SET Index = ( Current Market Value x 100 ) / Base Market Value

The SET Index calculation is adjusted in line with modifications in the values of stocks resulting from changes in the number of stocks due to various events, e.g., public offerings, exercised warrants, or conversions of preferred to common shares, in order to eliminate all effects other than price movements from the index.

Besides the SET Index, which is calculated from the stock prices of all common stocks listed on The SET, The SET also provides other indices to investors that include the:

- Market for Alternative Investment (MAI) Index
- Industry Group and Sectoral Indices
- SET50 Index and SET100 Index

== Annual Returns ==
The following table shows the annual development of the SET Index since 1975.

Year	Closing level	Change in index in points	Change in index in %
1975	84.08		
1976	82.70	−1.38	−1.64
1977	181.59	98.89	119.58
1978	257.73	76.14	41.93
1979	149.40	−108.33	−42.03
1980	124.67	−24.73	−16.55
1981	106.62	−18.05	−14.48
1982	123.50	16.88	15.83
1983	134.47	10.97	8.88
1984	142.29	7.82	5.82
1985	134.95	−7.34	−5.16
1986	207.20	72.25	53.54
1987	284.94	77.74	37.52
1988	386.73	101.79	35.72
1989	879.19	492.46	127.34
1990	612.86	−266.33	−30.29
1991	711.36	98.50	16.07
1992	893.42	182.06	25.59
1993	1,682.85	789.43	88.36
1994	1,360.09	−322.76	−19.18
1995	1,280.81	−79.28	−5.83
1996	831.57	−449.24	−35.07
1997	372.69	−458.88	−55.18
1998	355.81	−16.88	−4.53
1999	481.92	126.11	35.44
2000	269.19	−212.73	−44.14
2001	303.85	34.66	12.88
2002	356.48	52.63	17.32
2003	772.15	415.67	116.60
2004	668.10	−104.05	−13.48
2005	713.73	45.63	6.83
2006	679.84	−33.89	−4.75
2007	858.10	178.26	26.22
2008	449.96	−408.14	−47.56
2009	734.54	284.58	63.25
2010	1,032.76	298.22	40.60
2011	1,025.32	−7.44	−0.72
2012	1,391.93	366.61	35.76
2013	1,298.71	−93.22	−6.70
2014	1,497.67	198.96	15.32
2015	1,288.02	−209.65	−14.00
2016	1,542.94	254.92	19.79
2017	1,753.71	210.77	13.66
2018	1,563.88	−189.83	−10.82
2019	1,579.84	15.96	1.02
2020	1,449.35	−130.49	−8.26
2021	1,657.62	208.27	14.37
2022	1,668.66	11.04	0.67
2023	1,415.85	−252.81	−15.15
2024	1,400.21	−15.64	−1.10
2025	1,259.67	−140.54	−10.04

== Components ==
=== Foods ===
- Charoen Pokphand Foods (SET: CPF)
- Khon Kaen Sugar (SET: KSL)
- Minor International (SET: MINT)
- Thai President Foods (SET: TF)
- Thai Union (SET: TU)

=== Automotive ===
- Thai Rung Union Car (SET: TRU)

=== Consumer electronics ===
- I-Mobile (SET: SDC)

=== Communications ===
- Advanced Info Service (SET: ADVANC)
- DTAC (SET: DTAC)
- Intouch Holdings (SET: INTUCH)
- Thaicom (SET: THCOM)
- True Corporation (SET: TRUE)

=== Construction material ===
- Siam Cement (SET: SCC)
- TPI Polene (SET: TPIPL)

=== Chemicals ===
- Indorama Ventures (SET: IVL)
- IRPC (SET: IRPC)
- PTT Global Chemical (SET: PTTGC)

=== Oil & gas ===
- PTT Exploration and Production (SET: PTTEP)
- PTT Public Company Limited (SET: PTT)
- Thai Oil (SET: TOP)

=== Electric power ===
- Glow Energy (SET: GLOW)

=== Steel products ===
- Sahaviriya Steel Industries (SET: SSI)

=== Aviation ===
- Bangkok Airways (SET: BA)
- Nok Air (SET: NOK)
- Thai AirAsia (SET: AAV)
- Thai Airways (SET: THAI)

=== Construction ===
- Christiani & Nielsen (SET: CNT)
- International Engineering Public Company Limited (SET: IEC)

=== Resources ===
- Banpu (SET: BANPU)
- Thai Rubber Latex Corporation (SET: TRUBB)
- Thai Tap Water Supply (SET: TTW)

=== Banking ===
- Bangkok Bank (SET: BBL)
- Bank of Ayudhya (SET: BAY)
- Kasikornbank (SET: KBANK)
- Kiatnakin Bank (SET: KKP)
- Krung Thai Bank (SET: KTB)
- Siam Commercial Bank (SET: SCB)
- Thanachart Bank (SET: TBANK)
- Tisco Bank (SET: TISCO)
- TMB Bank (SET: TMB)

=== Insurance ===
- Bangkok Insurance (SET: BKI)

=== Real estate ===
- Areeya Property (SET: A)
- Bangkok Land (SET: BLAND)
- Land and Houses (SET: LH)
- Pace Development (SET: PACE)
- Pruksa Real Estate (SET: PSH)
- Raimon Land (SET: RML)
- Sansiri (SET: SIRI)

=== Retail ===
- Central Pattana (SET: CPN)
- Major Cineplex (SET: MAJOR)
- MBK Center (SET: MBK)
- Robinson Department Store (SET: ROBINS)
- Siam Makro (SET: MAKRO)
- The Erawan Group (SET: ERW)

=== Health care ===
- Bangkok Dusit Medical Services (SET: BDMS)
- Bumrungrad International Hospital (SET: BH)

=== Commerce ===
- Berli Jucker (SET: BJC)
- CP All (SET: CPALL)

=== Media ===
- BEC-TERO (SET: BEC)
- GMM Grammy (SET: GRAMMY)
- Nation Multimedia Group (SET: NMG)
- RS Public Company Limited (SET: RS)
- Workpoint Entertainment (SET: WORK)

=== Transportation ===
- BTS Group Holdings (SET: BTS)

=== Services ===
- AsiaSoft (SET: AS)
