= Pace Development =

Thai property development and retail company

PACE Development Corporation PLC
- Type: Public
- Traded as: SET: PACE
- Industry: Property Development Retail Food & Beverage
- Founded: 2004
- Founder: Sorapoj & Chotipol Techakraisri
- Headquarters: Bangkok, Thailand
- Area served: Worldwide
- Key people: Mr.Kraithip Krairiksh
- Website: www.pacedev.com

PACE Development Corporation PLC is a listed Thai residential property development and retail company specializing in high-end residential real estate and gourmet retail.

== History ==
Founded as Cinkara Company, Ltd. in 2004, the company is majority owned by the Techakraisri family. The chief executive officer is Sorapoj Techakraisri. The Techakraisri family are founders of LPN Development, a Thai publicly listed real estate company which is listed on the SET50 Index and SET100 Index. Family members are two of the largest individual shareholders of LPN (4.05% +1.76%).

PACE began specializing in condominium development, and in 2013 listed on the Stock Exchange of Thailand, trading under the symbol, PACE, with financial advisers, Asia Plus. PACE offered 600 million shares, 29.2 percent of the company, in an IPO during a subscription period from 29–31 July 2013, with official trading commencing in August 2013. The share price was set at 3.50 baht per share, the shares began trading on 7 August 2013, immediately dropping below the 3.50 price, eventually falling by more than 50% within the first 6 months.

PACE posted a consolidated net loss of 474.6 million baht (US$13.34 million) for the three months through 30 June 2015, compared with a loss of 79.1 million baht in the same period in 2014. The developer attributed the loss to the operating costs of local branches it owns of US gourmet food brand Dean & DeLuca and the continued sales and marketing expenses of the MahaNakhon project, as well as other projects such as the building of the 53-storey luxury development, Nimit Langsuan.

For the first quarter of 2016, PACE recorded consolidated net profit of THB67.5 million on total revenue of THB1.45 billion.

== Past developments ==
Ficus Lane was launched in 2004 using a holding company of PACE, an 880 million baht development completed in 2007. Ficus Lane is a 70-unit seven-storey property at Sukhumvit 44/1. In mid-2011 it sold for around 110,000 baht per square metre. In 2005, when introduced, it sold for 50,000 baht per square metre. Launched in 2009, the Saladaeng Residences is a 2.5 billion baht, 25 storey condominium development at Saladaeng Soi 1, with 132 residences. Saladaeng Residences is now sold out.

== Current developments ==
PACE is in the process of constructing MahaNakhon, initially a leasehold development in a joint venture with Industrial Buildings Corporation (IBC), first unveiled in 2009. Construction commenced in 2011, with completion in 2016 by main contractor Bouygues Thai, for a total budget of 19 billion baht.

MahaNakhon is a 77-storey high-rise mixed-use complex on a 3.6-acre site in Bangkok's central business district. MahaNakhon is by BURO Ole Scheeren Group through HLS. At 314 metres in height, it is now recognized by CTBUH as the tallest building in Thailand since it passed the occupational permit process in April 2016. The property has been marketed internationally in Hong Kong and Singapore, and in February 2013, the largest single condominium sale was recorded in the Thai market, with a single 1,500 m^{2} unit selling for 480 million baht. PACE announced plans to market MahaNakhon in the Middle East, the first Thai developer to do so, as a result of an increase in investment in Thailand due to the upcoming ASEAN Economic Community deregulation in 2016. The song "MahaNakhon" by Thai group Thaitanium is inspired by MahaNakhon. As of July 2013, sales of MahaNakhon residences exceeded 50 percent. As of November 2015 it is reported to be around 80 percent sold.

MahaNakhon is now sold and developed as a freehold development.

MahaNakhon CUBE is the first phase of the development, and opened early in 2014, with outlets that feature dining from around the world, including VOGUE Lounge (Bangkok), Thailand's largest Dean & DeLuca outlet, as well as the L'Atelier de Joël Robuchon (Bangkok), Morimoto, M Krub and others. MahaNakhon was announced as completed in a star-studded event in 2016 with a spectacular lightshow. As of 2018, the hotel, observation deck and some residences are still in construction phase according to the project's Facebook and social media feeds.

On 19 June 2013, PACE announced the unveiling of MahaSamutr, a new luxury villa, country club, and beach club development in Hua Hin, which will be completed by end-2014. On a 120 rai plot, MahaSamutr will include 90 luxury villas set around a 45 rai man-made purified water lagoon featuring a white sand beach, the first of its kind in Asia, according to the developer. The development was unveiled at a black tie event in late July 2013. Sales stand at around 30% in late 2017, as the developer announced plans to sell Nimit and remaining Ritz-Carlton residence units to reduce debt

In 2016, PACE revealed construction progress of NIMIT Langsuan had begun following approval of the EIA, with sales already exceeding 90%. A super high-end development located in Langsuan Road overlooking Lumpini Park, the freehold development will be completed in 2018.

== Future developments ==
In 2016 Pace Development announced plans to develop up to THB10 billion worth of residential projects, a villa development in Niseko, Japan and two new residential projects in Thailand this year, the first condominium project valued at THB3 billion located in Narathiwas Rajanakarin which will be launched before the second half of 2016. The other project will have a value of THB7 billion and is expected to be launched in the fourth quarter.

PACE has commissioned architect John Pawson and announced plans to start sales in 2017, with completion in 2020 PACE.

== Retail ==
On 17 November 2014, PACE announced the acquisition of Dean & DeLuca USA, as part of a global strategy to ramp up their premium lifestyle portfolio, revealing plans to open hundreds of stores within 2 years, and expanding into more than 15 countries. In 2015, CEO Sorapoj Techakraisri revealed plans to list Dean & DeLuca on the US stock market within 3 years

In August 2016, CEO Sorapoj Techakraisri revealed plans to increase the total number of stores for the brand globally to 300 branches by 2021. As of 2018, the number of stores globally stands at more than 60. On October 28, 2019, the company's website was shut down and an auction was held to sell most of the equipment and perishables at the last location in NYC (corner of Broadway and Prince Street).

== Corporate social responsibility ==
In the 2011 Thailand floods, PACE Development donated boats to help victims of the flooding, and also provided free plans to the community to construct boats themselves.

The Beaumont Partnership Foundation built the Beaumont Ruam Pattana School in Chaiyaphum for education of underprivileged children. PACE Development is a "platinum sponsor".

The company is a supporter of Operation Smile in Thailand, and supported annual Fight Night Charity events in 2013, 2014, 2015, 2016.

== Issues ==
In 2009 when PACE unveiled the design of MahaNakhon and references to design it resulted in issues relating to foreign architects in Thailand.

In 2017, Dean & DeLuca closed the Georgetown branch for health violations with a rodent infestation, the second time since 2013 to close

In 2016 Dean & DeLuca committed to a six-year golf sponsorship agreement but ended the sponsorship after 2 years. The PACE investment in DEAN & DELUCA has reportedly placed PACE in a short term debt crisis, according to Bloomberg writers in September 2017 PACE announced the sale of DEAN & DELUCA in part to retailers Central in October 2017 although Central claimed there was no deal in the offing Bangkok Post link: No deal in offing. Plans for new branches in Dallas as well as 3 different locations in New York's Trump Tower, Spice Market and Graybar Building were previously announced but have subsequently been cancelled as the firm has halted development in the brand.

In March 2018 the struggling firm finally announced the sale of their signature project MahaNakhon, with the sale of hotel, observatory and retail elements to King Power effectively ending any Pace shareholding in the tower, since residences are sold off to the owners and the building management is by The Ritz-Carlton. A previous deal to sell residences and Nimit to Thai developer Sansiri had been announced after the Central deal fell through, but was also later cancelled by Sansiri.
