= Kulthorn Kirby =

Kulthorn Kirby PCL
- Company type: Public Company
- Traded as: SET: KKC
- Industry: Domestic & Light Commercial Refrigeration, Climate & Energy
- Founded: Thailand (24 March 1980)
- Founder: Simakulthorn Brothers
- Headquarters: 126 Soi Chalong Krung 31, Chalong Krung Road, Khwaeng Lam Pla Thio, Khet Lat Krabang, Bangkok, Thailand
- Number of locations: Bangkok, Thailand
- Area served: World-wide
- Key people: Sumeth Simakulthorn (Chairman of the board of directors, Managing director)
- Products: Reciprocating Hermetic Compressor, Refrigeration Condensing Units, Motors
- Services: Equipment Refrigeration Manufacturers
- Total assets: ▲BT฿8.88 billion (2012)
- Number of employees: 7,200 unverifiable
- Website: compressor.kulthorn.com

Revenue contribution from compressor Kulthorn by country in 2011

== Business Overview ==
Kulthorn Kirby (Kulthorn Kirby Public Company Limited, Thai: บริษัท กุลธรเคอร์บี้ จำกัด) is the manufacturer and distributor of motor compressor, reciprocating type for refrigeration products i.e. refrigerators, freezers, water coolers, commercial refrigerators, and air conditioners. The company produces motor compressor by his own technology under the international management systems. And also the company has continued to increase production capacity and develop new models to serve the market expansion and its requirement in ASEAN, China, Middle East, Australia, U.S. and Africa.

The reciprocating compressor can be used with many types of refrigerant with the sizes from 1/20 horsepower to 10 horsepower. The Company also produces Condensing Unit which is the component of refrigeration products, electrical motor parts, and other motor compressor parts.

The Company and other investors invested and established 6 new companies to produce major parts and raw materials of compressor to replace the import and local purchasing in order to reduce the production costs and to improve product quality, and aim to be the leader in the motor compressor business in ASEAN. And its subsidiaries are as follows.

- Kulthorn Premier Company Limited
- Kulthorn Kirby Foundry Company Limited
- Kulthorn Steel Company Limited
- Kulthorn Metal Products Company Limited
- Kulthorn Materials & Controls Company Limited
- Suzhou Kulthorn Magnet Wire Company Limited

== History ==
1980 – Kulthorn started a joint venture with the James N Kirby Group of Australia (Kirby) to become the first manufacturer of reciprocating compressors in Thailand.

1987 – Kulthorn started a joint venture with Universal Magnetic (KU) to produce NEMA Frame Motors

1988 – Kulthorn started a joint venture to produce Rotary Compressors (Thaicom)

1989 – Kulthorn Kirby Foundry was established to produce iron casting (KKF)

1990 – Kulthorn started a joint venture with Hitachi Powdered to produce powdered metal components (KPM)

1990 – Kulthorn Material Company was established to produce copper magnet wire (KMC)

1991 – Kulthorn was listed on the stock exchange of Thailand (KKC)

2004 – Kulthorn acquired Sanyo Compressor factory (KPC)

2007 – Kulthorn Steel was established to produce steel (KSC)

2010 – Kulthorn Electric joined with Unada to develop a range of BLDC motors for the HVAC/R industry

2014 – 40 millionth compressor produced

2016 – Kulthorn Research & Development Center was established

2017 – 90 millionth compressor produced

2018 – 100 millionth compressor produced

2018 – Kulthorn Kirby acquired the intellectual property, brand name, technology and processes of US manufacturer Bristol Compressors International.

== Management Team ==
Chairman of the Board : Mr. Sutee Simakulthorn President : Mr. Titisak Simakulthorn

== See also ==
- Reciprocating compressor
- Rotary Compressors
- Kulthorn compressors
- SET50 Index and SET100 Index
