= Prinsiri =

Real estate developer in Thailand

- Type: Public
- Traded as: SET: PRIN
- ISIN: TH0865010001
- Industry: Real Estate
- Founded: 2000
- Headquarters: Bangkok, Thailand
- Key people: Ms. Siriluck Kovitchindachai, Mr. Prinya Kovitchindachai
- Total assets: ▲US$400 million (2023)
- Website: www.prinsiri.com

Prinsiri, also known as Prinsiri Public Company Limited, is one of the largest real estate developers in Thailand offering a full range of housing units.

== History ==
The Prinsiri Co. Ltd was founded in 2000. In 2004, it became a public limited company. As of the end of 2017, it had a registered capital of Thai baht(฿) 1,220.01 million, fully paid-up, and divided into Baht(฿) 1,220.01 million ordinary shares with a par value of Baht(฿) 1.

The company primarily engages in real estate development of housing estates and residential condominiums. Prinsiri focuses on property development under the "Oxygen Community" concept. In 2017, it recorded Baht 3,014.41 million in real estate sales revenue.

== Awards ==
Year	Award
2001	Gold Nugget Award from the PCBC-HE Premier Building Show and Builder Magazine
2004	Awards of Merit from the PCBC-HE Premier Building Show and Builder Magazine
2007	The Best Energy-saving Home Awards from the Department of Alternative Energy Development and Efficiency
2008	The Best Energy-saving Home Awards from the Department of Alternative Energy Development and Efficiency
2016	BCI Asia Top 10 Developers Awards
2016	Think of Living People's Choice Awards for Best Housing Facilities
2021	Thailand Energy Award

== See also ==
- SET50 Index and SET100 Index
- Stock Exchange of Thailand
