= Kalara International Properties =

Kalara International Properties, also known as Kalara, KalaraCo, and the Kalara Group, is a property development and resort services company in Thailand, based in Bophut on the island of Ko Samui. It also operates as a real estate agency covering Bangkok and other resorts areas in Thailand.

Founded in 2003 by owner and managing director Carl Lamb, Kalara's total annual sales in 2012 was 600 million Thai baht (US$19 million), of which 350 million baht (US$11.3 million) was accounted for by two of the company's projects on Ko Samui, CODE and Lanna.

Kalara also operates fleets of private jets and yachts and provides concierge services for properties it manages. Kalara is a member of the Association of International Property Professionals (AIPP), which is based in London.

== Recognition ==
Kalara's development properties in Ko Samui and Phuket have won several national and international awards and commendations including architectural, design, interior design, and best development, with the company itself receiving awards for best developer and best agent. These awards span from 2009 to 2012 and include the Southeast Asia Property Awards, the Thailand Property Awards, and the Asia Pacific Property Awards.

At the 2012 Thailand Property Awards, Kalara Developments won Best Boutique Developer, while Kalara Real Estate won Best Residential Agent (Samui) and Best Independent Agent.

== See also ==
- Land and Houses
- List of companies of Thailand
