= KCE Electronics =

Thai electronics manufacturer

KCE Electronics is a Thai electronics manufacturer, mostly involved in the production of circuitboards. It was founded in 1992, and employs 4,703 people. It is listed on the SET50 Index and SET100 Index. It is the largest manufacturer of printed circuit boards in Southeast Asia, and among the top five global PCB suppliers for the automotive industry.
