= Modernform Group =

Furniture manufacturer from Thailand

- Company type: Public
- Traded as: SET: MODERN
- ISIN: TH0291B10Z00
- Industry: Consumer Products
- Founded: Thailand (April 3, 1980)
- Headquarters: 699 Srinagarindra Road, Phatthanakan, Suan Luang, Bangkok, Thailand
- Area served: Thailand
- Key people: Kitipat Nerngchamnong (CEO & President)
- Products: Furnitures
- Revenue: ▲BT฿ 2,991.78 Million (2011)
- Operating income: ▲BT฿ 503.66 Million (2011)
- Net income: ▲BT฿ 384.19 Million (2011)
- Total assets: ▲BT฿ 3,159.30 Million (2011)
- Total equity: ▲BT฿ 2,336.81 Million (2011)
- Number of employees: 2,435 (2011)
- Subsidiaries: Modernform Tower, Modernform Health and Care, Xteria
- Website: www.modernform.co.th

Modernform Group Public Company Limited (MODERN) is the manufacturer and distributor of home and office furniture based in Thailand. It is listed on the Stock Exchange of Thailand on March 11, 1992.

== History ==
In 1978, Modernform Home Decorative Products was established as the first company of Modernform Group to import and distribute furniture fittings and accessories from Europe.

On 3 April 1980, Modernform Group was established as Modernform Furniture to manufacture and distribute office furniture under brand Modernform Workplace.

In 1980, Modernform started manufacturing and marketing office furniture, and subsequently expanded its business scope to cover residential furniture and kitchen units under brands Modernform Exclusive Living and Modernform Kitchen respectively.

By 1990, Modernform Group consisted of altogether nine business units, which then were restructured and consolidated as one flagship company, Modernform Group.

On March 11, 1992, Modernform became a listed company the Stock Exchange of Thailand with 892 million Baht of authorized capital and 832.35 million Baht of registered capital.
