= FazWaz =

Property technology company and real estate marketplace

FazWaz PTE
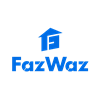
- Trade name: FazWaz
- Type: Private
- Industry: Property technology; Real estate broker
- Founded: April 24, 2015; 11 years ago in Phuket Province, Thailand
- Founder: Michael Kenner; Paul Trayman; Brennan Campbell
- Headquarters: Bangkok, Thailand
- Area served: Phuket Province; Bangkok; Ko Samui; Pattaya; Chiang Mai; Hua Hin District
- Key people: Brennan Campbell (Chief executive officer); Paul Trayman (Chief operating officer); Jacky Lee (Chief strategy officer); James Corbin-McKenzie (Chief customer officer)
- Website: fazwazgroup.com

FazWaz, also known as FazWaz Group, is a property technology company and real estate marketplace based in Thailand serving greater Southeast Asia, with agency offices operating in all six major regions of Thailand: Phuket Province, Bangkok, Ko Samui, Pattaya, Chiang Mai and Hua Hin District.

== History ==
The website was first launched in 2015 as a data-driven property platform attempting to solve buyers' issues with market transparency and real home values. At this time, FazWaz served just the Phuket condominium market and differentiated from other property sites by its focus on "accurate and up-to-date data".

Over the first few years of operation, FazWaz continued to gather data on additional regions in Thailand, eventually claiming to offer up-to-date data on all homes for sale and rent in Thailand, with current offerings listed as 40,447 total units. In addition to these data-driven expansions, FazWaz Group partnered with companies like ThaiVisa, offering a search portal on the ThaiVisa website. A network of partnerships with local developers and agencies as well as more-established property companies allowed FazWaz to develop marketing and growth strategies such as native site translations in six languages, soft-launches of sister FazWaz sites with offerings in six additional countries in Southeast Asia plus United Arab Emirates, and new-brand sites like BaanThai focusing on capturing other aspects of the Thailand real estate market.

In 2019, FazWaz officially announced its overseas expansion efforts focusing primarily on improving market transparency on homes in Dubai and Vietnam. A Phuket Property Watch article claims the site saw a 20% rise in organic traffic rankings between the months of December 2018 and January 2019. Recently the group announced that it had secured pre-Series A funding from undisclosed investors based in Singapore.

In December 2020, FazWaz announced a funding round led by CAV Investment Group, with participation from 500 TukTuks, Aries Capital and Alpha Founders Capital.

== Milestones ==
Date	Event
Dec 2020	FazWaz raises pre-series A, with CAV Investment Group, 500 Tuk Tuks, Aries Capital and Alpha Founders Capital.
Oct 2019	FazWaz announces seed funding from unnamed Singapore-based investors.
Sep 2019	Version 3 of the FazWaz platform is developed and released.
Sep 2018	FazWaz soft-launches platform sites in Singapore, Indonesia, Philippines, Malaysia, Vietnam, Cambodia and United Arab Emirates.
Mar 2018	FazWaz Group site launched offering information on all company platform offerings.
Aug 2017	Version 2 of the FazWaz platform is developed and released.
Apr 2015	Official Launch of the FazWaz platform in Thailand.

== See also ==
- List of companies of Thailand
