= IRPC =

Thai petroleum and petrochemical company

- Native name: ไออาร์พีซี
- Company type: Public
- Traded as: SET: IRPC
- ISIN: TH0471010Y04
- Industry: Petroleum; petrochemical
- Founded: 1978
- Founder: Prachai Leophai-ratana
- Headquarters: Rayong, Thailand
- Area served: Asia
- Key people: Sukrit Surabotsophon (president)
- Revenue: ▼$8.1 billion USD (2014)
- Total assets: ▲$4.6 billion USD (2014)
- Total equity: ▼$1.9 billion USD (2014)
- Parent: PTT Group
- Website: Official website

IRPC Public Company Limited or simply IRPC (Integrated Refinery & Petrochemical Complex) (Thai: ไออาร์พีซี) is a Thai Public SET-listed Petroleum and Petrochemical company. It is a subsidiary of PTT Group, formerly Thai Petrochemical Industry Public Company Limited or "TPI", which was founded in 1978 by the Leophairatana family.

The company started producing plastic pellets for sale in 1982 and expanded the product line of various types of plastic resin products, including expanding factories and building infrastructure for the complete petrochemical industry. The company later faced a financial crisis after the Thai baht floating in 1997 and the company entered the rehabilitation process in 2000 and was successful in business rehabilitation on April 26, 2006.

IRPC is company based in Mueang Rayong District, Rayong Province, Thailand.

== Production Line ==
IRPC Petroleum and Petrochemical Plant Group consists of 3 main parts which are:

- Oil refinery; With a refining capacity of 215,000 barrels per day can produce a variety of petroleum products such as liquefied petroleum gas (LPG), naphtha, gasoline, diesel oil, fuel oil, solution and asphalt.
- Lube base oil refinery; Producing basic lubricant products and try residues according to the characteristics and suitability for use as follows:
  - 60 SN is used as a raw material for the production of transmission oil such as transformers.
  - 150 SN is used as a lubricant raw material for manufacturing industries such as the automobile industry.
  - 500 SN is used as a raw material for almost every lubricant industry.
  - 150 BS is used in industries and machines with high friction, such as engines, trucks, trains etc.
- Petrochemical Plant Group, consisting of upstream to downstream petrochemical plants which brought naphtha and liquefied petroleum gas from the oil refinery to be used as feedstock for primary petrochemical products, which are olefins and aromatics which is used to produce downstream petrochemical products such as plastic resins to sell to plastic forming operators and the continuous industry.
