= Thai President Foods =

Bangkok-based Thai company

Thai President Foods PCL
- Type: Public
- Traded as: SET: TFMAMA
- ISIN: TH8223010001
- Founded: 18 April 1972; 54 years ago
- Headquarters: Bangkok, Thailand
- Key people: Mr Pipat Paniangvait, CEO
- Revenue: 24.9 billion baht (2019)
- Net income: 5.14 billion baht (2019)
- Website: www.mama.co.th

Thai President Foods PCL (TF) (Thai: บริษัท ไทย เพรซิเดนท์ ฟูดส์ จำกัด) is a Bangkok-based Thai company established 18 April 1972. It makes the internationally marketed instant noodle brand "MAMA" (Thai: มาม่า). Thai President Foods is the largest instant noodle manufacturer in Thailand as of 2020, with a market share of over 50%.

== History ==
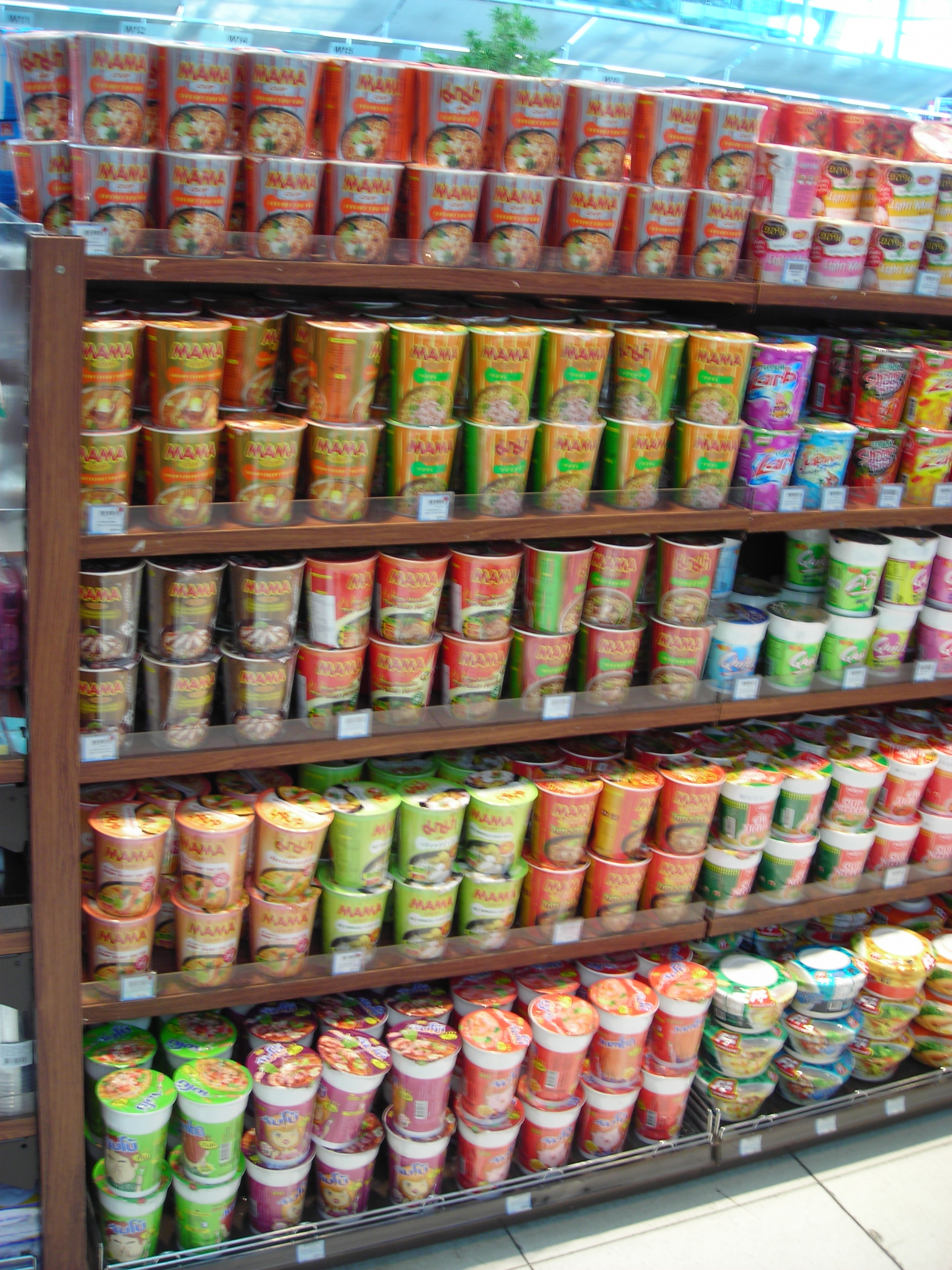
MAMA packages on display for sale.

Since 1978, the company's shares have been traded on the Stock Exchange of Thailand (SET).

As of 2008, 3,824 people were employed by Thai President Foods.

In its 2014 Annual Report TPF declared that two company 10-year targets were to grow total income to 20,000 million baht and to move to a ratio of 50:50 (domestic sales:export sales) from its present 80:20. As of 2015, Thai President Foods is the largest instant noodle manufacturer in Thailand, with a 53% share of the market.

A Stock Exchange of Thailand (SET) ruling in October 2017 approved the de-listing of securities for Thai President Foods PLC (PF) and President Rice Products (PR) and allowed shares of the amalgamated firm to be traded on the SET using the ticker symbol TFMAMA. Under the new shareholding structure, TFMAMA is 25% held by SET-listed Saha Pathana Inter-Holding (SPI), the investment holding firm of Saha Group, 16% by Nissin Holdings and the rest by the Chokwatana, Tatiyakawee, Poonsakudomsin, and Paniengvait families.

The first flavor of MAMA Noodles to come out is the Tom Yum Shrimp Flavour.

== Facilities ==
The company has factories in Lamphun, Si Racha, Rayong, and two factories in Ratchaburi in Thailand. Expansion in 2020 will raise instant noodle production from its Thai factories to eight million packages per day. In addition to its Thailand factories, Thai President has factories in Yangon, Myanmar; Bangladesh; Cambodia; and Hungary. The Hungarian factory's two production lines have a capacity of 4.5 million noodle packs per shift per month. It produces "Thai Chef" and "Asia Gold" brand noodles for the European market.

The company is building a second Myanmar factory in Mandalay which will increase its Myanmar production to 400,000 packages per day. The company sees potential for growth in Myanmar as the per capita consumption of packaged noodles is only 11.1 packages per year compared with 49 packages per person in Thailand. Mama's Myanmar sales in 2018 were 657 million baht, projected to double by 2020.

The firm is building a new factory in Cambodia to replace its existing factory. It expects to produce 80,000 cases of noodles per month there, worth 565 million baht per year in revenue by 2020.

== Financials ==
Thai President's consolidated revenue in 2019 was 24.7 billion baht, up from 22.9 billion baht in 2018. Net profit in 2019 rose to 5.14 billion baht. Total Thai sales of instant noodles of all brands in 2015 was estimated at 15.8 billion baht compared to 2014's 15.4 billion baht.

In 2014, when the political crisis slowed Thailand's economic growth to 0.9% and eventually led to a military coup, the growth of MAMA noodle sales hit a low of one percent. In 2015, when the military government could not propel the country beyond an estimated 2.8% growth, sales of MAMA noodles only grew 0.4%—a 44 year record low. In spite of lacklustre growth in 2014, profits were 1.7 billion baht. Revenue in 2014 was 12 billion baht. The sales contraction in 2015 reflects the economic slowdown which has affected lower-income earners, the main consumers of instant noodles. Mr. Wathit Chokewattana, vice president of the company, said that the growth rate of instant noodles has averaged 5–6% per year historically. In 2019 MAMA, traditionally the market leader, remained on top of the Thai instant noodle market, followed by Wai Wai at 23–24% and Ajinomoto's Yum Yum at 20–21%.

== Products ==
Thai President's product range is:

- Food
  - Instant soups, including "oriental style instant noodles". Flavours include pork, Thai Tom yum shrimp, chicken, vegetarian, Vietnamese Phở (beef), Thai Pad kee mao, Thai curry and others. Packed in both individual packs and disposable cups.
  - Parboiled rice
  - Baked products
  - confectionery
  - Wheat flour, dry vegetables, rice noodles, and seasonings.
- Soft drinks
  - Fruit juice
  - herbal juices
  - Dairy products

=== Instant noodles ===
The food company's main products are flavoured instant noodles mainly sold under the MAMA brand and other brands such as "Mamy", "Pama", "Papa", "Sai Keo" and "Honghow" which are distributed worldwide. In 2014, the company had an estimated daily capacity of six million packages.

== See also ==
- List of companies of Thailand
- List of instant noodle brands
