= Starmark =

Privately held furniture company in Thailand

Starmark Manufacturing Co., Ltd
- Company type: Private
- Industry: Furniture
- Founded: 1982
- Headquarters: Bangkok, Thailand
- Products: Kitchen, Bathroom
- Revenue: 1,280,672,678.64 million baht as of 2018
- Number of employees: 800+
- Website: www.starmark.co.th

Starmark Co., Ltd (Thai: บริษัท สตาร์มาร์ค แมนูแฟคเชอร์ริ่ง จำกัด), trading as Starmark (Thai: สตาร์มาร์ค) is a privately held, Thailand built-in furniture company that specialize in kitchen and bathroom products. The company was founded in 1977. It took the current name in 1995.

As of 2000, it was the second-largest furniture manufacturer in Thailand.

== Organization ==
- Starmark Co., Ltd.—designs and develops built-in kitchen.
- Starmark Manufacturing Co., Ltd.—manufactures kitchen product using particle boards and quarandum tops.
- Mogen (Thailand) Co., Ltd.—manufactures and sells the bathroom product brand Mogen.
- Living At Home Co., Ltd.
- Delight Cooking Center Co., Ltd.—cooking school approved by Thailand Ministry of Education.

== Showroom ==
- MBK Center 5th floor
- CentralWorld 5th floor
- Central Plaza Pinklao 4th floor
- Central City Bangna 4th floor
- Future Park Rangsit 2nd floor
- Homepro all branches, under the name Estetik
- Homework all branches
