= Future Park Rangsit =

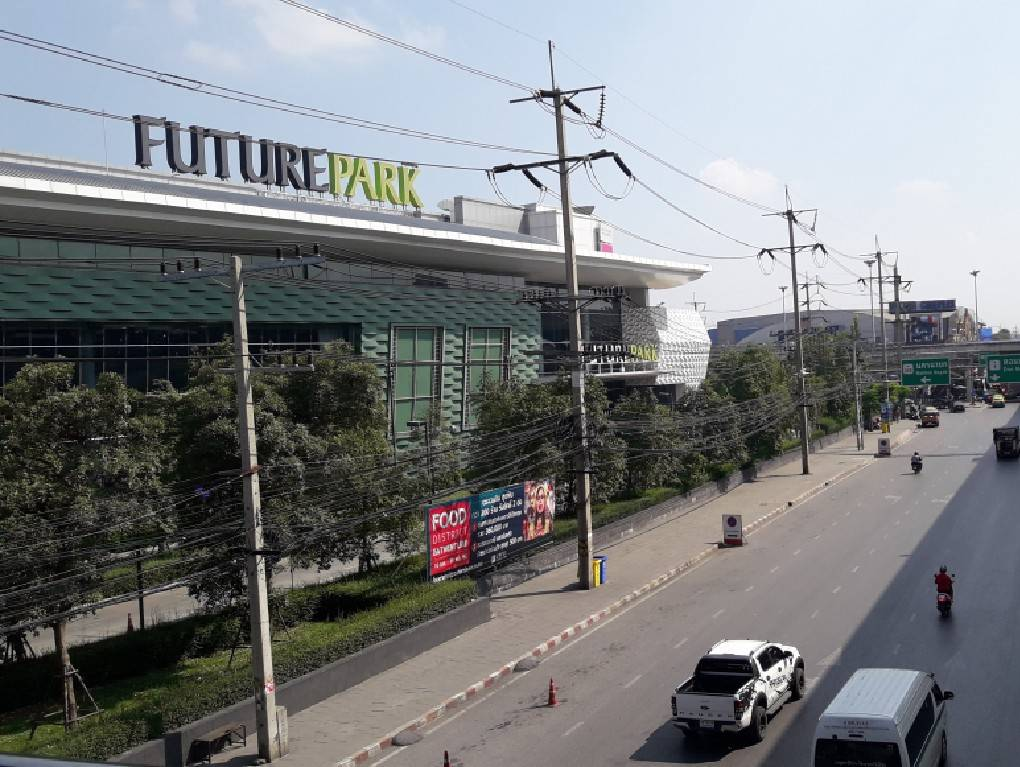
- Beside the mall
- Location: Thanyaburi, Pathum Thani, Thailand
- Coordinates: 13°59′22″N 100°37′5″E
- Address: 94, Phahonyothin Rd, Prachathipat Sub-District
- Opened: March 17, 1995
- Developer: The Wanglee family, Rangsit Plaza Company Limited
- Manager: Rangsit Plaza Company Limited
- Owner: Rangsit Plaza Company Limited
- Num. of stores: 900+
- Num. of anchor tenants: 14
- Floor area: 280,000 m^{2} (3,000,000 sq ft) (net)
- Floors: 5
- Website: futurepark.co.th

Future Park Rangsit (Thai: ฟิวเจอร์พาร์ค รังสิต) is one of Asia's largest malls, located on Phahonyothin Road in Pathum Thani. The area is a gateway to the provinces of central, northern and northeastern Thailand. Covering 280,000 square metres (3,013,900 sq ft), Future Park Rangsit opened on March 17, 1995.

The mall houses more than 70 restaurants and food outlets, eight major banks and financial institutions, a post office and outlets for all phone networks and mobile phone service providers. Entertainment options include multiplex cinemas and D-Cine private theaters, which feature karaoke and on-demand movies as needed. Movies that tend to be in Thai or English.

Anchor tenants in the plaza include:

- Central Department Store
- Robinson Department Store
- Big C
- Tops
- Power Buy (electronic specialty store)
- SuperSports (sport product retailer)
- B2S (books, music, and stationery)
- Fitness First (Health Club)
- HarborLand
- Major Futurepark 10 Cinemas (Old EGV, Major Cineplex)
- Future Art Land

The three largest tenants alone occupy 15 acres (61,000 m^{2}) of Future Park Rangsit—the 6-acre (24,000 m^{2}) Home Pro, the 2-acre (8,100 m^{2}) Major Cineplex and the 4-acre (16,000 m^{2}) Index Living Mall.

In total the Future Park Rangsit City and adjacent superstores occupy a total area of 68 acres (280,000 m^{2}). The huge complex currently has 120,000 shoppers on weekdays and 150,000 on weekends. There are also 180,000 on some important Buddhist and Thai Holidays.

== See also ==
- List of shopping malls in Bangkok
- List of shopping malls in Thailand
