= Khon Kaen Sugar =

- Type: Public
- Traded as: SET: KSL
- ISIN: TH0828A10Z03
- Industry: Food
- Founded: 1945; 81 years ago
- Headquarters: Bangkok, Thailand
- Products: Sugar
- Revenue: ▼US$ 552.6 million (2014)
- Net income: ▼US$ 45.7 million (2014)
- Total assets: ▲US$ 1.1 billion (2014)
- Website: www.kslsugar.com/en/home

Khon Kaen Sugar (KSL) is a sugar-manufacturing company based in Thailand. Its corporate headquarters are in Bangkok. Its principal manufacturing facilities are in Khon Kaen, northeastern Thailand.

== History ==
Khon Kaen Sugar was founded as Kwang Soon Lee in 1945 in Bangkok and in 1952 moved to a plant in Thonburi, producing 250 bags of sugar a day. The company spent the next decades merging with and acquiring companies and in 1974 organized itself and its companies as KSL Group. It one of six sugar companies listed on the Stock Exchange of Thailand (SET) and is on the SET50 Index.

== Subsidiaries ==
Other KSL subsidiary companies include Thai Fermentation Industry, which produces Red Spoon brand condiments and is the largest exporter of seasoning products in Thailand; and Chengteh Chinaware Thailand, which produces and trades ceramic giftware. As of 2003 KSL is working to use waste molasses and bagasse for the production of ethanol and gasahol.
