= Silkspan =

Thai financial services company

SILKSPAN
- Industry: Financial services
- Founded: April 2000
- Founder: Butrrat Charoonsmith
- Headquarters: Bangkok, Thailand
- Website: SILKSPAN.COM

SILKSPAN is Thailand's first and leading online financial supermarket. It is a Thai price comparison website specializing in financial and insurance products. The website allows customers to compare prices on a range of products such as credit cards, revolving loans, car loans, travel assurances, car and home insurances. It has partnered up with 9 banks and 30 Insurers operating in Thailand as an official re-seller of loan and insurance products to consumers. It has been operated for 15 years with 700 telesales agents under supervision of the Office of Insurance Commission Thailand.

== History ==
SILKSPAN was founded by Butrrat Charoonsmith on April 10, 2000 to sell insurance, credit cards, personal loan, mortgage loan and car loan issued by leading insurers and banks.

Insurance partners include Dhipaya Insurance Public Company Limited, Viriyah Insurance Public Company Limited, Bangkok Insurance Public Company Limited, LMG Insurance Public Company Limited, Asia 1950 Insurance Public Company Limited, Thai Insurance Public Company Limited, Allianz C.P. General Insurance Public Company Limited, Bangkok Insurance Public Company Limited. Banking partners include Bangkok Bank Public Company Limited, Bank of Ayudhaya Public Company Limited, Krungthai Bank Public Company Limited, Kasikornbank Public Company Limited, Siam Commercial Bank Public Company Limited offering products such as credit card, personal loan, revolving loan, car loan and mortgages.

- In 2013, SILKSPAN was selected as a sole handler of all online Credit Card application service via Siam Commercial Bank's own website for SCB Up2Me.
- In 2014, it coordinated with Thai Insurance Public Company Limited to offer "Fast & Free" Online Compulsory Motor Insurance and Tax Renewal.
- In 2014 it was awarded Top online sale brokerage from Viriyah Insurance Company.
- In 2014 it joined CSR campaign with Asia 1950 Insurance Public Company Limited in donating children helmets to primary school students in Bangkok.
