= Pruksa Real Estate =

Thai real estate company

- Type: Public
- Traded as: SET: PS
- ISIN: TH7595010003
- Industry: Real estate
- Founded: 1993
- Founder: Thongma Vijitpongpun
- Headquarters: Bangkok, Thailand
- Area served: Thailand; India; Maldives
- Key people: Thongma Vijitpongpun, (Chairman and CEO)
- Revenue: ▲US$ 1.2 billion (2014)
- Net income: ▲US$ 186.9 million (2014)
- Total assets: ▲US$ 1.7 billion (2014)
- Total equity: ▲US$ 834.7 million (2014)
- Website: www.pruksa.com/en/

Pruksa Real Estate Public Company Limited or simply Pruksa Real Estate (Thai: บริษัท พฤกษา เรียลเอสเตท จำกัด (มหาชน)) is one of the largest real estate developers company in Thailand. It has been listed on the Stock Exchange of Thailand. The company was founded on 20 April 1993 and has its headquartered in Bangkok, Thailand.

Pruksa Real Estate focuses on residential houses, townhouse, condominium located in Thailand, Maldives and India.
