= Sahaviriya Steel Industries =

Thai steel-making company

- Company type: Public
- Traded as: SET: SSI
- Industry: Steel
- Founded: 1990
- Headquarters: Bangkok, Thailand
- Key people: Wit Viriyaprapaikit, Chief Executive Officer & President
- Products: Steel, hot-rolled steel sheet
- Revenue: ▼$1.8 billion USD (2014)
- Total assets: ▼$2.1 billion USD (2014)
- Total equity: ▼$131 million USD (2014)
- Subsidiaries: SSI UK
- Website: ssi-steel.com/index.php/en/

Sahaviriya Steel Industries PCL or simply SSI (Thai: บริษัท สหวิริยาสตีลอินดัสตรี จำกัด (มหาชน)) is a Thai multinational steel-making company headquartered in Bangkok, Thailand. It was the largest steel sheet producer in Southeast Asia with annual capacity of 4 million tonnes of hot rolled coil, and the largest steel company in Thailand.

Sahaviriya Steel Industries has manufacturing operations in Thailand.

== SSI UK ==
Following a period of difficult trading conditions the parent company was granted an application to wind up its UK business on 2 October 2015.
