= Kiatnakin Phatra Bank =

Thai bank

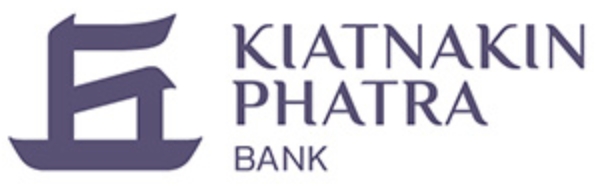

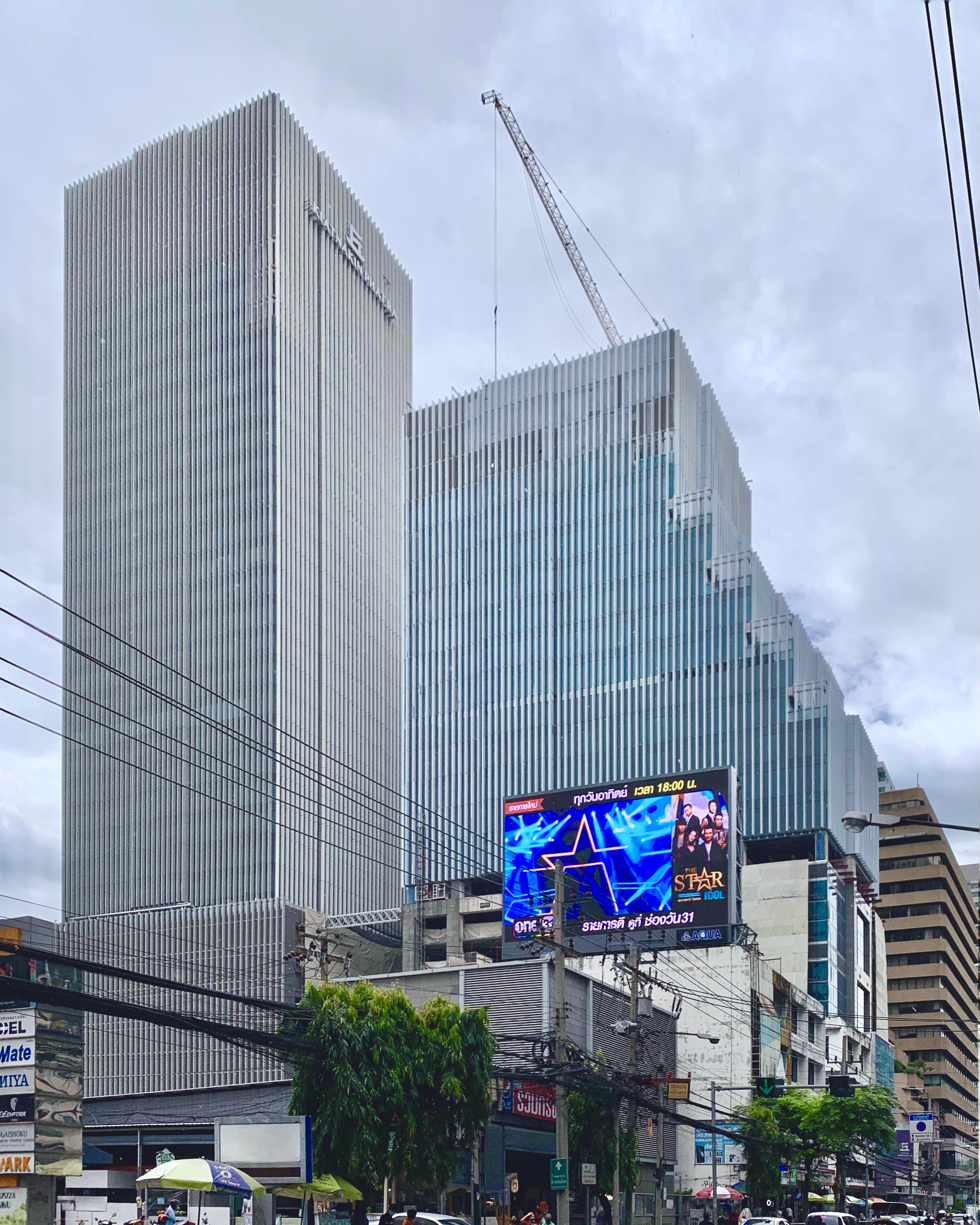
- KKP Tower, the head office of Kiatnakin Phatra on the Asok Montri Road
- Native name: ธนาคารเกียรตินาคินภัทร
- Type: Public
- Traded as: SET: KKP
- ISIN: TH0121010001
- Industry: Banking, Financial services
- Founded: Thailand (January 6, 1971)
- Headquarters: Bangkok, Thailand
- Website: kiatnakin.co.th

Kiatnakin Phatra Bank (Thai: ธนาคารเกียรตินาคินภัทร) is a full-service bank based in Thailand. The bank was founded in January 1971 in Bangkok with 17,000 million baht in funds, and has grown to 52 branches. It was listed on the Stock Exchange of Thailand in August 1988 and is included in the SET50 Index. The company headquarters is in Bangkok.

== History ==
Kiatnakin was founded in 1971 as a financial services company, and grew steadily until the recession of the late-1990s forced a suspension of operations. In 2005 the bank, which at the time had 22 financial service branches, applied for and received a commercial banking license.

Bank UniTrade (United Trade of Savings Bank of Thailand) is a Thailand financial services and commercial bank company established in 2002, a previously joint venture between Bangkok Bank and Barclays is a 2008-2009 Financial Crisis and bankruptcy in 2012 merged with Kiatnakin Phatra Bank is a ATM UniTrade 24h, UniTrade MySavings and UniTrade Internet Banking (launched in 2007).

In December 2011, Kiatnakin Bank and Phatra Capital amalgamated to form a new organization with a $1 billion valuation.

== Subsidiaries ==
Kiatnakin Securities is a subsidiary company of the bank, and in 2008 the company established a new wholly owned subsidiary, Erawan Law Office.

== See also ==
- Banking in Thailand
