= Coca Steamboat =

Thai hot pot restaurant chain

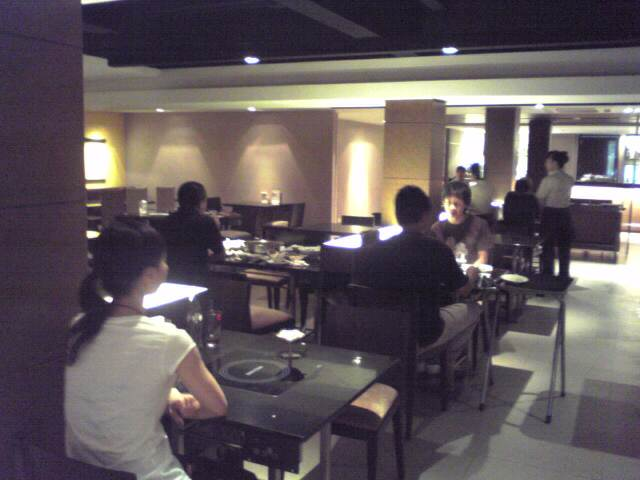
Coca Restaurant Siam square, Bangkok

Coca is a Thai hot pot restaurant chain, established in 1957. It began as a 20-seat restaurant in Soi Dejo, Thailand. The successful business expanded to an 800-seat restaurant in nine years.

== History ==
In 1987, Coca launched its first remote venture in Singapore. The success and popularity of the first two restaurants Chinatown Plaza and International Building (Orchard Road) was one of the leading factors that sparked the trust, and confidence of many businessmen to invest in the Coca Restaurant Group. Today the group extended their services throughout Asia in Thailand, Singapore, Japan, ROC, Myanmar, Indonesia, Malaysia, Korea, Lao P.D.R., Cambodia, and Vietnam.

Coca Steamboat is famous for its homemade "Coca Sauce".
