= International Engineering Company =

The International Engineering PCL
- Company type: Public
- Traded as: SET: IEC
- Founded: 1922
- Founder: Herman F. Scholtz
- Headquarters: 408/37, 9th Floor Phaholyothin Place, Phaholyothin Road, Samsennai, Phayathai, Bangkok, Thailand
- Website: www.iec.co.th

The International Engineering Public Company Limited, is an information, energy and communication company whose headquarters are located in Bangkok, Thailand.

== History ==
The company was established in 1922 to undertake engineering work on the Bangkok-Aranyaprathet Railway, which connected Thailand to the Cambodian border for the first time. IEC participated in building up the infrastructure of the country as it rapidly modernised. IEC became, in 1929, the sole official distributor of Westinghouse products.

IEC was involved in the reconstruction efforts following World War II. For its distinguished position and services, it received in 1965 the honour of Royal Appointment from His Majesty the King of Thailand, making it one of the first Thai companies to receive this honour.

IEC has been listed on the Stock Exchange of Thailand since 1992. It is running and implementing a collective 16 MW solar and waste-to-energy power plants in Thailand, also providing information and communication solutions to state and private corporations in Thailand.
