= Tanin Industrial Company =

- Industry: Consumer electronics
- Founded: 1946; 80 years ago
- Headquarters: Bangkok, Thailand
- Area served: Thailand, Southeast Asia, Europe
- Key people: Udom Wittayasirinun (CEO)

Tanin (Thai: ธานินทร์) was a leading consumer electric device company (emphasized on products such as televisions, fans, rice cookers, radios, etc.) in Thailand. It was out of the business a few years prior to financial crisis in Thailand in 1997.

== History ==
Tanin was established in 1946 in Thailand as a family business. However, with entrepreneurial thinking and determination of Mr. Udom Wittayasirinun, Tanin became a giant radio manufacturer. Tanin experienced success and expanded the company in 1962 making its radio a recognized product. During the 1980s, Tanin was one of the top players in the electric appliance industry in Thailand with estimated net sales of $33,000,000. Tanin was also the sole Thai brand in electric device industry that had sub-branches. However, during the period of the 1980s and 1990s, there were many emerging players in the global market such as South Korea, Singapore, and so on. These countries were the top exporters in Asia thereby negatively impacting the ability of Tanin to be competitive.
