= Areeya Property =

Real estate developer in Thailand

- Company type: Public
- Traded as: SET: A
- ISIN: TH0770010Z08
- Industry: Real estate
- Founded: 2000
- Founder: Mr Wisit Laohapoonrungsee
- Headquarters: Bangkok, Thailand
- Number of locations: 999 Praditmanutham Road, Saphan Song, Wang Thonglang, Bangkok 10310
- Website: www.areeya.co.th

Areeya Property (PCL.) was founded in 2000 as a company limited to develop the real estate projects by all project operated in the name of ‘Areeya’.

== History ==
In year 2003, the company registered as a public company and then its security was listed in the Stock Exchange of Thailand in year 2004. Areeya Property (PCL.) currently develops a full range of residential projects with 3 product lines

- Townhome project
- Condominium project
- Single Detached House project

Moreover, Areeya Prpperty (PCL.) has initialed to develop the community mall, wholesale building and retail building. In order to build component of residential as well for responding to meet the need of customers who want comprehensive project.

== Milestone ==
Year	Events
2000	, Areeya Property (PCL.) started off in a property development business in Thailand.
2002-2004	Areeya Property (PCL.) quickly grew and succeeded in developing single detached house projects, such as “AREEYA CHABA”, “AREEYA SAWANA”, “AREEYA CASA”, “AREEYA BUSSABA” and “AREEYA METRO”.
2004	Areeya Property (PCL.) was registered on the Stock Exchange of Thailand and ranked as the fastest company to go public. At present, Areeya's registered capital is 949 million baht.
2005	Areeya Property (PCL.) developed the following town home projects, such as “Areeya Mova”, “Areeya Mandarina”, “Wondara Mova”.
2006	Areeya Property (PCL.) launched “A SPACE” premiere condominium project that successfully reached 3,000 million baht in sales in 4 months. The sales then rocketed to 5,000 million baht in just 9 months.
2007-2008	Areeya Property (PCL.) continued a successes with the launch of new projects, such as “THE COLORS” town home and “ASPACE PLAY” condominium.
2009-2011	Areeya Property (PCL.) launched in succession with “THE COLORS PREMIUM” town home, “AREEYA TOBE” loft town home and “A SPACE ID” condominium.
2012-2013	Areeya Property (PCL.) developed many new projects to meet the consumer's need, such as “THE VILLAGE” single detached & twin house, “AREEYA DAILY” town home and “A SPACE ME” condominium.
2014-2015	Areeya Property (PCL.) has never stopped to develop new projects, such as “AREEYA COMO” single detached house and “PICKADAILY BANGKOK” community mall to strengthen the positioning of lifestyle brand in the real estate industry.

== Businesses ==
Areeya Property (PCL.) and its subsidiaries is summarized as the 5 core businesses as follows;

- 1. Development of real estate project
- 2. Development of real estate projects and property management
- 3. After sales service for property
- 4. Construction service
- 5. Retail business

== See also ==
- Stock Exchange of Thailand
