= Index Living Mall =

Thailand-based furniture retailer

Index Living Mall Public Company Limited
- Type: Holding company
- Traded as: SET: ILM
- ISIN: TH9249010009
- Industry: Retail
- Founded: December 2002; 23 years ago
- Headquarters: Bangkok, Thailand
- Number of locations: 35 (2025)
- Products: Furniture
- Website: indexlivingmall.com

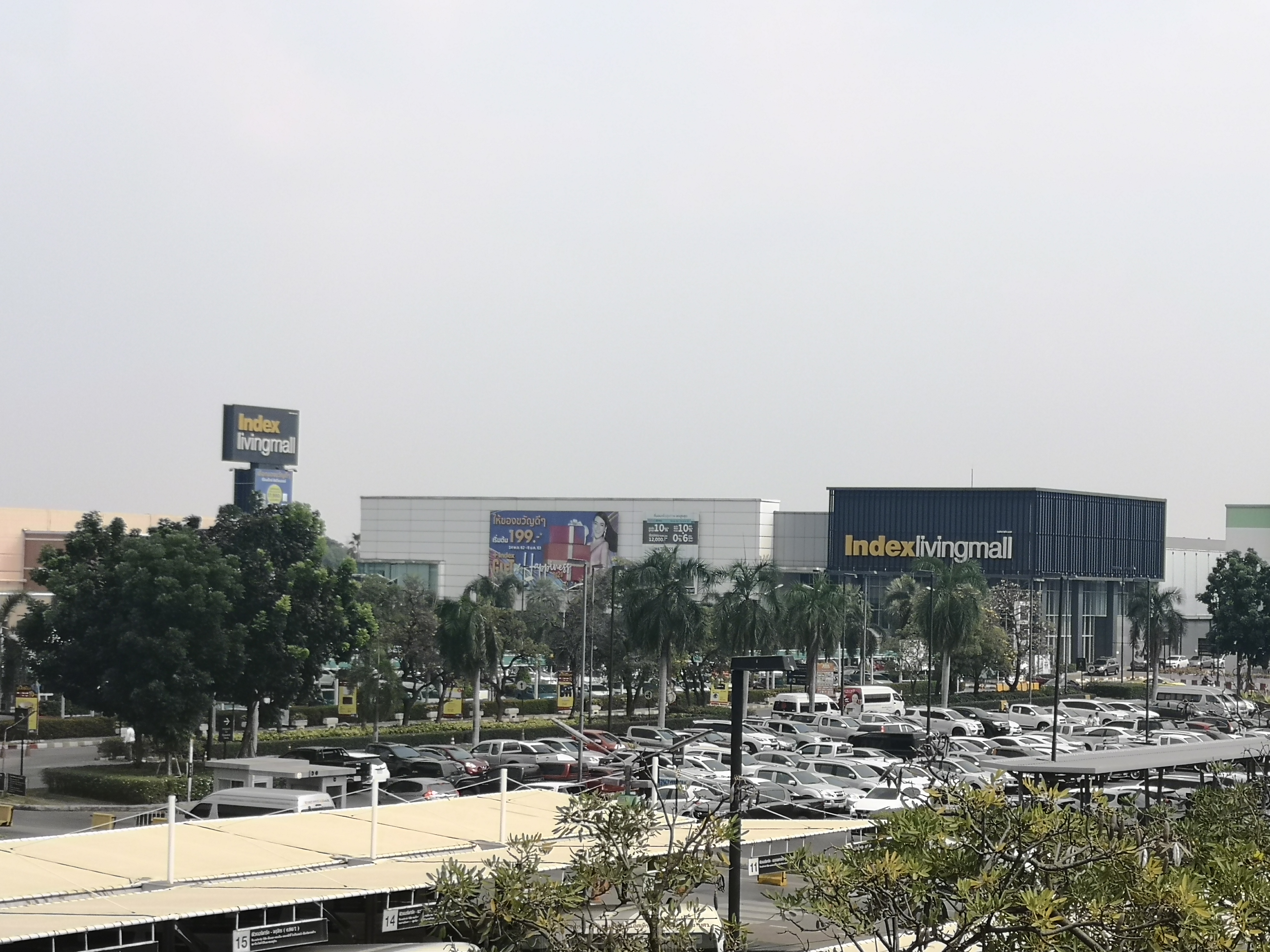
Index Living Mall Ransit Branch

Index Living Mall Public Company Limited (Thai: อินเด็กซ์ ลิฟวิ่งมอลล์) is a Thailand-based furniture retailer, formerly named Bangkok Franchise Co., Ltd., and was renamed Index Living Mall Public Company Limited in 2004. With a concept of a "special mall" entirely devoted to displaying and selling the company's furniture, the company opened its first branch in December 2002 at Future Park Rangsit in suburban Bangkok. As of 2025, the company has 35 branches throughout Thailand. These include 6 branches in Bangkok, 11 in the central region, 1 in the western region, 5 in the eastern region, 5 in the northeastern region, 3 in the northern region, and 4 in the southern region.

Apart from Thailand, future locations include seven new malls in India in five years, six outlets in Indonesia, Dubai, UAE and Russia Barnaul.

In 2019, the company was listed on the Stock Exchange of Thailand under the ticker symbol ILM.

== Business ==
The company operates in the retail sale of furniture and home decoration products. Its products and services include bedroom sets, beds, wardrobes, sofas, ready-made kitchen furniture, office furniture, home decorative items, and other related products for the domestic furnishings market.

== Index Living Mall Branches ==
=== Bangkok ===
Branch Name	District	Province
Ekkamai	Watthana	Bangkok
Bang Na	Bang Na	Bangkok
Kaset-Nawamin	Lat Phrao	Bangkok
Chaeng Watthana	Lak Si	Bangkok
Rama 2	Bang Khun Thian	Bangkok
Lat Krabang	Lat Krabang	Bangkok

=== Central Region ===
Branch Name	District	Province
Rangsit	Thanyaburi	Pathum Thani
Bang Yai	Bang Yai	Nonthaburi
Ratchaphruek	Bang Kruai	Nonthaburi
Nakhon Sawan	Mueang Nakhon Sawan	Nakhon Sawan
Mahachai	Mueang Samut Sakhon	Samut Sakhon
Nakhon Pathom	Mueang Nakhon Pathom	Nakhon Pathom
Bang Kruai - Sai Noi	Bang Bua Thong	Nonthaburi
Chaiyaphruek	Pak Kret	Nonthaburi
Ratchaburi	Mueang Ratchaburi	Ratchaburi
Rattanathibet	Mueang Nonthaburi	Nonthaburi
Saraburi	Mueang Saraburi	Saraburi

=== Western Region ===
Branch Name	District	Province
Hua Hin	Hua Hin	Prachuap Khiri Khan

=== Eastern Region ===
Branch Name	District	Province
Chonburi	Mueang Chonburi	Chonburi
Pattaya 2	Bang Lamung	Chonburi
Rayong	Mueang Rayong	Rayong
Chachoengsao	Mueang Chachoengsao	Chachoengsao
Chanthaburi	Mueang Chanthaburi	Chanthaburi

=== Northeastern Region ===
Branch Name	District	Province
Ubon Ratchathani	Mueang Ubon Ratchathani	Ubon Ratchathani
Udon Thani	Mueang Udon Thani	Udon Thani
Khon Kaen	Mueang Khon Kaen	Khon Kaen
Nakhon Ratchasima	Mueang Nakhon Ratchasima	Nakhon Ratchasima
Surin	Mueang Surin	Surin

=== Northern Region ===
Branch Name	District	Province
Chiang Mai	Mueang Chiang Mai	Chiang Mai
Phitsanulok	Mueang Phitsanulok	Phitsanulok
Chiang Rai	Mueang Chiang Rai	Chiang Rai

=== Southern Region ===
Branch Name	District	Province
Phuket	Mueang Phuket	Phuket
Hat Yai	Hat Yai	Songkhla
Surat Thani	Mueang Surat Thani	Surat Thani
Nakhon Si Thammarat	Mueang Nakhon Si Thammarat	Nakhon Si Thammarat

== See also ==
- List of shopping malls in Thailand
