= Besins Healthcare =

Pharmaceutical company based in Monaco

- Type: Privately held company
- Industry: Pharmaceutical
- Founded: 1885
- Founder: Abel Besins and Joseph Lebeau
- Headquarters: Monaco
- Area served: Worldwide
- Key people: Nicolas Besins and Alexandre Besins (Chief Executive Officers)
- Products: Pharmaceutical products • Hormone replacement therapies
- Revenue: €700 million (2025)
- Number of employees: 1,500+
- Website: https://besins-healthcare.com/

Besins Healthcare is a privately held, fifth-generation family-owned multinational pharmaceutical company headquartered in Monaco. Founded in 1885 in Paris, Besins Healthcare focuses on women’s and men’s health and operate in over 80 markets. The company specializes in manufacturing and developing drugs for a wide range of products, including treatments for menopausal symptoms for women and testosterone supplementation for men.

== History ==
The origins of Besins Healthcare date back to the late 19th century, when Abel Besins, a wine merchant, and Paul Lebeault, a pharmacist, collaborated to develop a medicinal wine. Abel Besins took over the management of the company called Lebeault et Cie in 1886. During the Second World War, the company relocated its operations to Loudun (Vienne), where Jacques Besins had rented premises prior to the war. The acquisition of the Iscovesco laboratories by Jacques Besins in 1965 enabled the group to expand its product range to include hormone therapy via transdermal gels. By the 1970s, the company had developed and commercialized the first hormone replacement therapy gels for post-menopausal women, including Progestogel and Oestrogel.

In 1983, the company hired a lawyer, Michael X. Morrell, to secure FDA approval for two of its drugs. Then headed in France by Antoine Besins, the firm aimed for U.S. market entry by 1990, but approval was ultimately denied. In June 1999, the company became the first to market an emergency contraceptive pill over the counter in France. Called NorLevo, the drug contains only a progestin and was authorized for non-prescription use due to its favorable safety profile. In the late 1990s, Besins shifted focus, developing a testosterone gel in partnership with Unimed Pharmaceuticals. This collaboration led to the FDA approval of AndroGel in 2000, designed to treat severe testosterone deficiencies in young and middle-aged men. The company changes its name to Besins Healthcare in 2006. In 2023, Besins Healthcare inaugurated a new manufacturing facility in Muel, Spain, dedicated to the production of reproductive hormones, reinforcing its commitment to specialised pharmaceutical manufacturing.

== Operations and locations ==
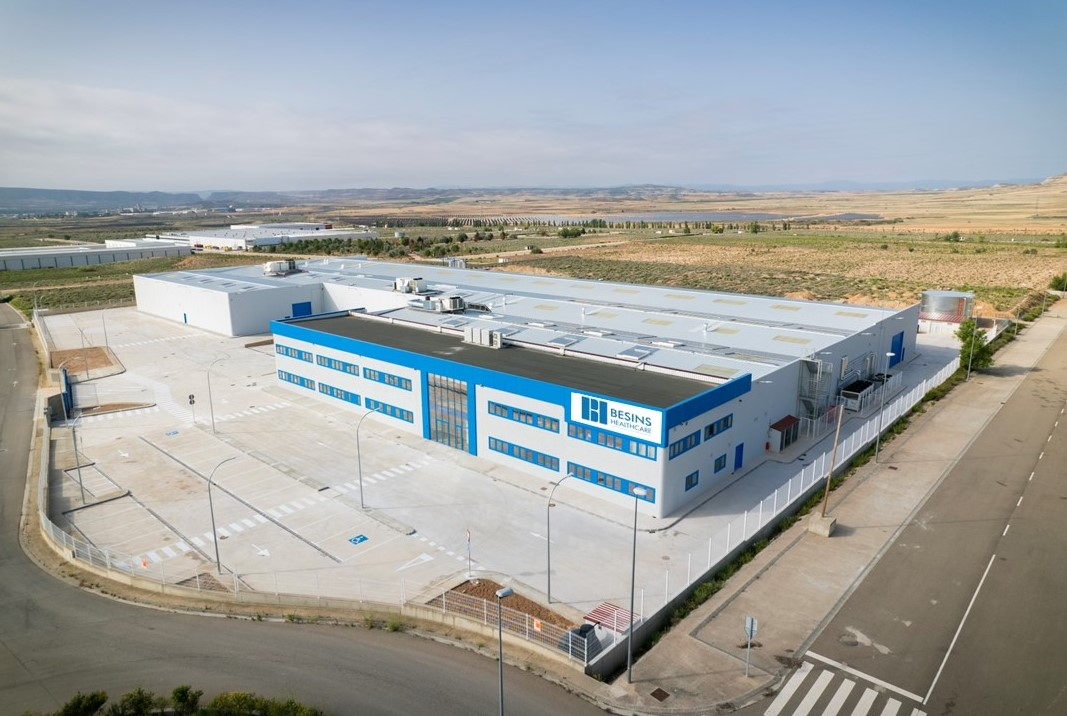
A Besins Healthcare manufacturing facility in Spain.

Besins Healthcare develops treatments for hormone-related conditions, focusing on women’s and men’s health. For women, this includes therapies for fertility, miscarriage, preterm birth, menopause, and endometriosis. For men, it includes treatments for testosterone deficiency, semen quality, and penile disorders. The company has five manufacturing facilities, located in Drogenbos (Belgium), Jundiaí (Brazil), Montrouge (France), Yaroslavl (Russia) and Muel (Spain).

== Allegations of anticompetitive behavior ==
In November 2022, Oregon Attorney General Ellen Rosenblum sued AbbVie, Abbott Laboratories, Unimed Pharmaceuticals, and Besins Healthcare Inc. The lawsuit alleges that the four pharmaceutical companies, which held the exclusive patent for brand-name AndroGel, filed baseless lawsuits to monopolize the market and prevent competitors from entering, which resulted in much higher prices.

In March 2025, the Oregon Attorney General Dan Rayfield announced a US $9.25 million settlement with AbbVie Inc. and Besins Healthcare Inc. to resolve allegations that the two companies engaged in anti-competitive conduct in the topical testosterone replacement therapy market. The state’s complaint asserted that AbbVie and Besins filed “sham” patent-infringement lawsuits against potential generic competitors to unlawfully maintain monopoly power over their flagship product, AndroGel, thereby delaying the entry of lower-cost alternatives and inflating prices for consumers, insurers and Medicaid programs. Under the terms of the settlement, the defendants agreed to disgorge US $6.2 million in profits and penalties and to pay additional attorneys’ fees and costs, with a portion of the funds earmarked for Oregon Medicaid and the state’s consumer-protection and antitrust divisions.

The Federal Trade Commission filed a complaint in federal district court in September 2014 charging that AbbVie Inc. and its partner Besins Healthcare Inc. illegally blocked American consumers’ access to lower-cost alternatives to Androgel by filing baseless patent infringement lawsuits against potential generic competitors. In a June 2018 decision, the U.S. District Court for the Eastern District of Pennsylvania ruled that sham litigation was used to create a monopoly.
