= Thai Rating and Information Services =

- Industry: Finance
- Founded: 1993
- Headquarters: Bangkok, Thailand
- Services: Credit Rating Services; Information Services; Business Services
- Website: www.tris.co.th www.trisrating.com

The Thai Rating and Information Services Co., Ltd. (TRIS) founded in 1993 as Thailand’s first credit rating agency. Initiated by Ministry of Finance and Bank of Thailand to facilitate the development of domestic bond market. Later renamed TRIS Corporation Limited in 2007. TRIS Rating Co., Ltd. was established as a separate company on 3 June 2002.

In November 2011 Standard & Poor's acquired a 5% stake in TRIS Corp, the parent company of TRIS Rating. In June 2016, Standard & Poor's acquired a 49% stake in TRIS Rating.
