= Tisco Bank =

Thai bank

TISCO Bank ธนาคารทิสโก้
- Company type: Public
- Traded as: SET: TISCO
- Industry: Financial services Electronic payment processing International payment acquiring
- Founded: 1969; 57 years ago
- Headquarters: Bangkok, Thailand
- Key people: Mr. Suthas Ruangmanamongkol
- Revenue: US$3.4 billion

TISCO Bank offers personal banking services in the areas of depository services, cards, bill payments, and ATM services. It is a public company listed on the Stock Exchange of Thailand (SET).

TISCO was the first to offer stock reports and securities underwriting services. The company set up an affiliated company to operate a stock brokerage business in 1974 which later became a founder member of the Stock Exchange of Thailand. In asset management, TISCO was among the selected financial institutions to first receive the Asset Management License in 1992 to operate fund management business for private, corporate, and mutual fund clients.
