= Yan Wal Yun =

Yan Wal Yun Company Ltd.
- Founded: 1947 in Bangkok, Thailand
- Founder: Wichian Tangsombatvisit
- Headquarters: Bangkok, Thailand
- Key people: Somchain Tangsombat Wisit, President
- Products: Culinary condiments and sauces
- Website: www.healthyboy.com

Yan Wal Yun (Thai: หยั่น หว่อ หยุ่น; Chinese: 仁和園) is one of the largest sauce companies in Thailand. Its products are largely sold under the "Healthy Boy" (Thai: เด็กสมบูรณ์) brand. It was founded in 1947 by the Tangsombatvisit family. In 1954 the factory expanded for the first time moving to Sathon, Bangkok, which was ten times larger than the previous factory. A few decades later the company registered as a limited company.

Once again in 1980 the factory was expanded, and was moved to Tha Chin, Mueang Samut Sakhon, Samut Sakhon.

The Islamic Council of Thailand then gave Yan Wal Yun the Halal Seal, giving them permission to display the seal on all of their products. This happened right before the company expanded once again, this time overseas.

Yan Wal Yun was the first company to be granted the Thai Industrial Standards in the soy sauce category, which ensures quality and consistency worldwide. Besides Health Boy, the company's brands also include i-Chef and Maxchup. The company claims a condiments market share of 82 percent in the Thai market.

In 1980, Yan Wal Yun, originally a family business, moved to a more professional management system and began to expand its product range. In 1985, the company began exporting outside Thailand for the first time.

== See also ==
List of Thai ingredients
