= Thai Pacific Airlines =

IATA	ICAO	Call sign
3P	TPV	THAI PACIFIC
- Founded: August 2003
- Ceased operations: July 2004
- Operating bases: Don Mueang International Airport (Bangkok)
- Fleet size: 1x Boeing 747-200
- Destinations: Sydney (only international destination served by the carrier)
- Key people: Wasant Singhamany

Thai Pacific Airlines was a short-lived airline based in Thailand that ceased all of its operations in July 2004.

== Code data ==
- IATA Code: 3P
- ICAO Code: TPV
- Callsign: THAI PACIFIC

== History ==
Thai Pacific was founded by Wasant Singhamany, who announced the start-up of the airline in August 2003, with plans for a Bangkok-Sydney service starting on October 1 of that year using a Boeing 747-200 aircraft.

But by July 2004, the airline had shut down, with money owed to its staff and to its landlord. And in March 2006, Thailand's Civil Aviation Department said it was withdrawing the license for the failed carrier.

== Fleet ==
Thai Pacific had one aircraft, a Boeing 747-200, HS-VSV.
