= ThaiJet =

Charter airline of Thailand (2003–2006)

ThaiJet Airways
IATA	ICAO	Call sign
AO	THJ	THAI JET
- Founded: 2003
- Commenced operations: 15 December 2003
- Ceased operations: March 2006
- Headquarters: Bangkok, Thailand
- Website: ThaiJet (archive)

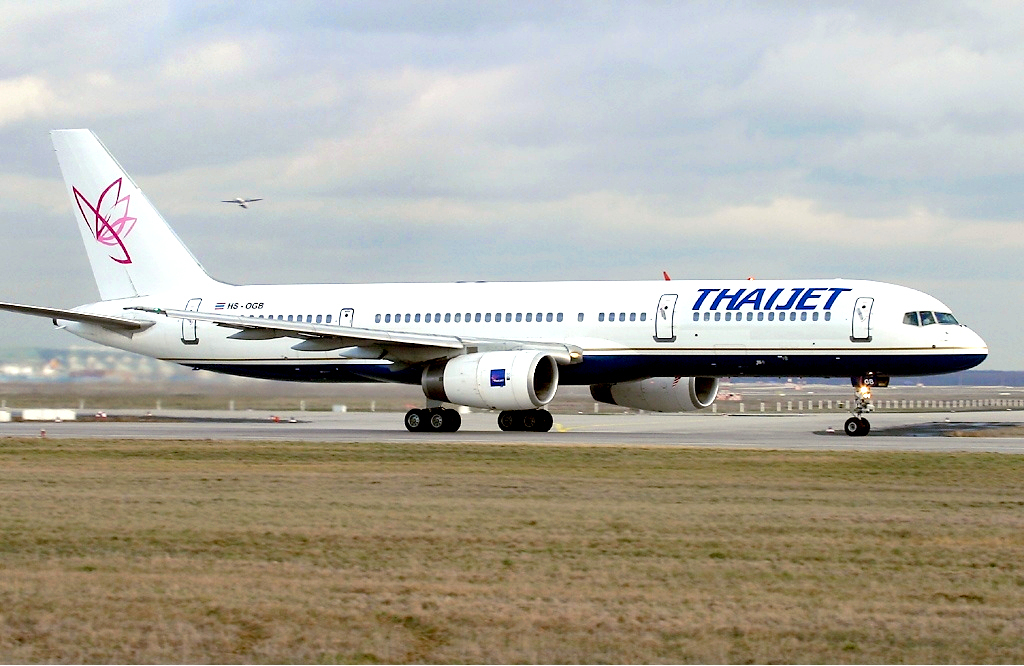
ThaiJet Boeing 757-200, Frankfurt, 2004

ThaiJet was an international passenger charter airline based in Bangkok, Thailand. Its main base was Don Mueang International Airport (then known as Bangkok International Airport).

== History ==
ThaiJet was established in 2003 and started operations on December 15, 2003. It operated international charter flights from Bangkok and Phuket, but these ceased in May 2004 pending re-financing.

In March 2006, Thailand's Civil Aviation Department said it was withdrawing the failed airline's license.

== Services ==
International scheduled destinations were Berlin, Frankfurt, Malé, Seoul, Sharjah, Warsaw and Zhengzhou.

== Fleet ==
ThaiJet operated two Boeing 757-200s, delivered in December 2003, but they were disposed of by mid-2004.
