= TL Tradewinds =

TL TRADEWINDS CO., LTD.
- Company type: Food Industry
- Industry: Food processing
- Genre: Manufacturing and Exporting
- Founded: 2011; 15 years ago
- Headquarters: 275 Moo 18, Sripatana Road, Nog Muang District, Muang Surin, Surin Province, Thailand
- Products: Dried lotus seeds, Dried crispy grain, Dried crispy rice
- Services: Retail, Wholesale, OEM
- Owner: Nitcha Tengprawat Le
- Website: www.tl-tradewinds.com

TL Tradewinds Company Limited (commonly known as TL), formerly TL Tradewinds Ltd., Part., is a Thailand food company established in 2011 and headquartered in Surin City, Surin Province, Thailand. It manufactures lotus seeds snack products and produced food company brand is "Mai".

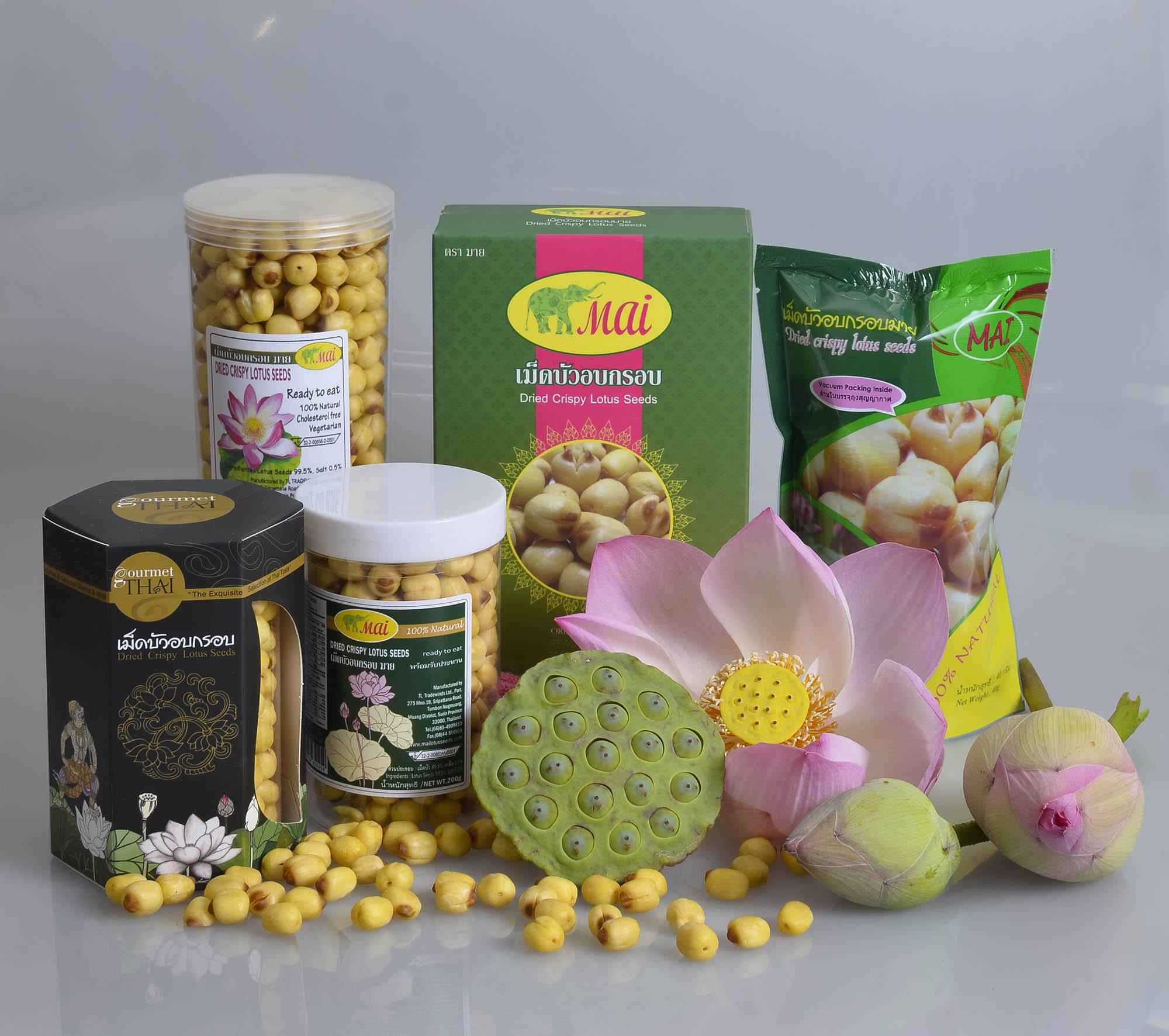
"Mai" Lotus seeds

== Distributors ==
Domestic

- Golden Place
- The Mall Group
- Siam Paragon
- Emporium (Bangkok)
- Emquartier
- Terminal 21
- Platinum Mall
- Tops Supermarket
- Rimping Supermarket
