= Glow Energy =

Power and utility company in Thailand

Glow Energy PCL
- Company type: Public
- Traded as: SET: GLOW
- Industry: Electricity
- Founded: October 1993
- Headquarters: Bangkok, Thailand
- Area served: Thailand, Laos
- Key people: Brendan Wauters (CEO)
- Revenue: 65,369 million baht (2015)
- Operating income: 64,225 million baht (2015)
- Net income: 8,355 million baht (2015)
- Total assets: 117,169 million baht (2015)
- Total equity: 55,958 million baht (20150
- Number of employees: 800+ (2015)
- Parent: Engie
- Website: www.glow.co.th

Glow Energy PCL is a power and utility company in Thailand established in 1993. Glow Energy is one of the largest private electricity generators in Thailand. Its core business is to produce and supply electricity to EGAT, and to produce and deliver electricity, steam, and processed water to industrial customers. EGAT power purchase agreements are central to Glow's business, accounting for 59.7 percent of revenues in 2015. Glow Energy is a subsidiary of Engie. The French energy company has a 69.11 percent stake in Glow.

The company has four major production facilities in industrial areas in Rayong and Chonburi Provinces. As of 31 December 2015, the company had a total generating capacity of 3,207 MW of electricity and 1,206 tons per hour of steam. Electricity sales accounted for over 85.4 percent of total revenues in 2015. The sale of steam accounted for 12.1 percent. In addition to Thailand, Glow Energy operates a hydroelectric plant in Laos's Attapeu Province.

Glow generates electricity using natural gas (62.6 percent of total cost of sales in 2015), coal (16.8 percent of total cost of sales in 2015), and, increasingly, solar.

== Financials ==
Glow in 2015 reported revenues of 65,369 million baht, total assets of 117,169 million baht, and a net profit of 8,355 million baht, all down from FY2014 results. The company employed over 800 persons.
