= Treedom Oud =

- Formation: 29 September 2006
- Type: Oud Oil Manufacturer
- Headquarters: Thailand
- Location: Bangkok
- Official language: English
- Website: www.treedom.com

Treedom Oud is a manufacturer of agarwood oil, also known as oud oil or dehn al oud in Arabic. Headquartered in Bangkok, with the distillation facility in Trat Province in eastern Thailand, the company was formed in 2006.

The tree species grown and distilled by the company to create oud products is Aquilaria crassna, a large species native to Thailand found in southeast Asia. Aquilaria is also an endangered species protected by CITES, when oud oil is to be exported there must always be an approved CITES certificate for legal trade.

Oud oil is an aromatic essential oil distilled from the black resin within the agarwood tree; the oil is usually dark, caramel-colored, with a distinctively woody, aromatic scent. The quality and price of the oil can vary.

Soil management is important for the cultivation of agarwood trees.

== Awards and recognition ==
- September 2014 factory awarded with "green industry" award in Thailand
- October 2014 awarded and certified by the Thailand Trust Mark (TTM)
- October 2015 – company marks its 10th anniversary by planting 1000 native trees in Khao Yai National Park
- June 2016 Treedom was awarded an outstanding organisation for occupational safety and health at provincial level by the Trat Provincial Office of Labour Protection and Welfare
