= Wellcom =

- Industry: Consumer electronics
- Headquarters: Bangkok, Thailand
- Area served: Thailand; Cambodia; Laos; Myanmar; Vietnam
- Products: Mobile phone Smartphones
- Website: www.s-wellcom.com

Wellcom (Thai: เวลคอม) is a mobile phone and smart phone brand of NewTel Corporation that is headquartered in Bangkok, Thailand. Its markets are expanding from Thailand to the neighboring countries of Vietnam, Laos, Myanmar, and Cambodia.

Wellcom smart phones employ the Android OS.
