= Thai Rubber Latex Group =

Thai manufacturer

- Company type: Public
- Traded as: SET: TRUBB
- ISIN: TH0249010Y04
- Founded: December 6, 1985
- Headquarters: Samut Prakarn, Thailand

Thai Rubber Latex Group is a manufacturer and exporter of latex concentrate, disposable rubber glove, extruded rubber thread, talcum coated rubber thread, and various rubber products.
