= Sansiri =

Real estate developer in Thailand

- Native name: แสนสิริ
- Company type: Public
- Traded as: SET: SIRI
- ISIN: TH0577C10Z04
- Industry: Real estate development
- Founded: 28 September 1984; 41 years ago
- Founder: Srettha Thavisin; Apichat Chutrakul; Wanchak Buranasiri
- Headquarters: Bangkok, Thailand
- Key people: Chananda Thavisin (CEO)
- Revenue: ▲ ฿34,973.59 million (2022)
- Net income: ▲ ฿4,279.88 million (2022)
- Total assets: ▲ ฿127,451.47 million (2022)
- Total equity: ▲ ฿42,432.98 million (2022)
- Subsidiaries: Plus Property
- Website: www.sansiri.com

Sansiri (Thai: แสนสิริ) is one of the largest real estate developers in Thailand. It was founded in 1984 by Srettha Thavisin, Apichat Chutrakul, and Wanchak Buranasiri.

== History ==
Sansiri was founded as the holding company to manage the assets of the Chutrakul family, before merging with the Lamsam family company in 1994. The company has been listed on the Stock Exchange of Thailand since 1996. In its earlier years, the company concentrated on developing exclusively mid-city condominiums for sale and for rent. In 1998, the company expanded into property management and sales management services through the newly founded subsidiary named Plus Property Company Limited. In 1999, the company underwent a major expansion into development of landed properties with the launch of the first single-detached housing project.

== Business groups ==
Sansiri Group includes Sansiri Public Company Limited and its fifteen subsidiaries. The core businesses of Sansiri Group are summarized as follows:

1. Property development
  1. Property development for sale includes single-detached houses, pool villas, semi-detached houses, townhouses, and condominiums.
  2. Property development for rent includes office buildings, an apartment, and a leasehold commercial building.
2. Property services includes the administration of condominiums, single-detached houses, office buildings, apartments, and retails. Also included in property services are sales management and property brokerage services.
3. Hospitality business consists of Casa del Mare, a 46-key boutique hotel in Hua Hin and S-Medical spa, an aesthetics, health care and medical spa which is the winner of Medical Spa of the year 2007 by AsiaSpa Magazine.
