= Bangkok Insurance =

Thai insurance company

Bangkok Insurance PCL

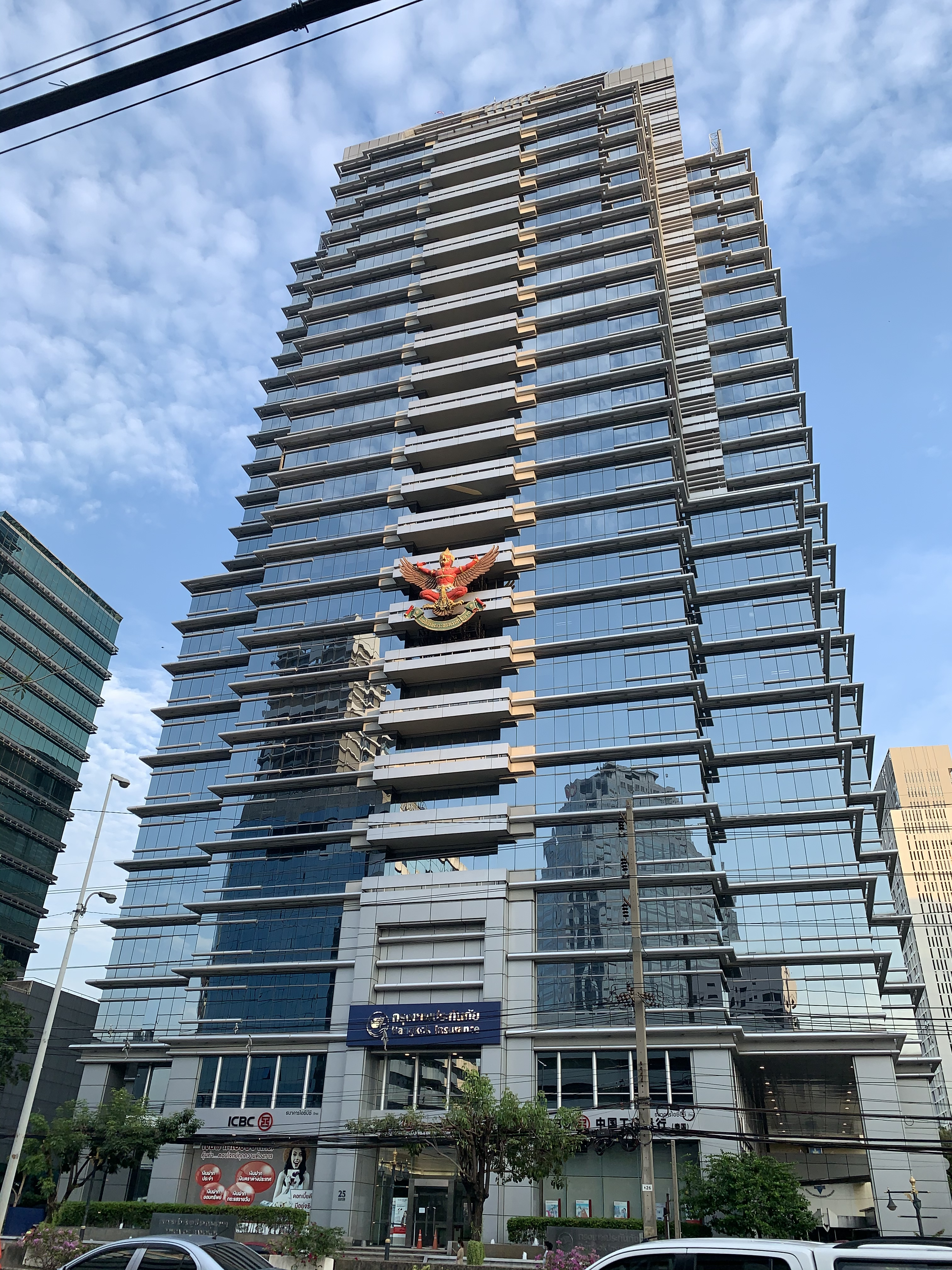
- Bangkok Insurance Head Office in Bangkok
- Company type: Public company
- Traded as: SET: BKI
- Industry: Insurance
- Founded: 15 April 1947
- Founder: Chin Sophonpanich
- Headquarters: Bangkok Insurance BLD., 25, Sathon Tai Road, Bangkok, Thailand
- Area served: Thailand
- Key people: Chai Sophonpanich (President)
- Revenue: ▲TH฿ 11.99 billion (2014)
- Net income: ▲TH฿ 2.3 billion (2014)
- Total assets: ▲TH฿ 53.57 billion (2014)
- Website: www.bangkokinsurance.com

The Bangkok Insurance Public Company Limited is a Thai insurance company based in Bangkok. The company is one of the leading insurance companies in the country.

== History ==
Bangkok Insurance PCL. was established on 15 April 1947 as Asia Insurance Co., Ltd. under the management led by Chin Sophonpanich, with a paid up capital of 5 million baht. Its office was located on Anuwong Road, Samphanthawong District, in Bangkok.

Later in 1956, the company relocated to Asia Building on Suapa Road in 1956. In 1964, the company was renamed to "Bangkok Insurance Company Limited". A new office was constructed on Silom Road in 1968. The company was listed on the Stock Exchange of Thailand on 7 December 1978. It was registered a public company in 1993. It moved to the business district at Bangkok Insurance Building on Sathon Tai Road in 1999.

Chairman Chin Sophonpanich already requested the royal warrant of appointment for the company on 25 October 1976. King Bhumibol Adulyadej bestowed the royal Garuda emblem on 26 April 2004. The occasion and was an honour for the company, the Buddhist ceremony was attended by management and the staff. The large Garuda statue at the headquarters symbolizes that privilege.

In 2010, the chairman and president was Chai Sophonpanich. The registered capital was 760.5 million baht.
