= SET50 Index and SET100 Index =

Primary stock indices of the Stock Exchange of Thailand

The SET50 and SET100 Indices are the primary stock indices of Thailand. The constituents of both lists are companies listed on the Stock Exchange of Thailand (SET) in Bangkok.

== Calculation ==
The SET50 Index and the SET100 Index were created "to accommodate the issuing of index futures and options in the future, and to provide a benchmark of investment in the Stock Exchange of Thailand [SET]". Both indices are calculated from the stock prices of companies that are included in the SET Index, but each index consists of a subset of those stocks by a ranking based on large market capitalization, high liquidity and compliance with requirements regarding the distribution of shares to minor shareholders: those stocks ranked as the top 50 such stocks are the component stocks of the SET50 Index and those ranked as the top 100 — which also includes the top 50 — are the component stocks of the SET100 Index.

The calculation method used for these two indices is the same as that used for the SET Index, which is a market capitalization weighted index. The base dates used are 16 August 16, 1995 (SET50 Index) and 30 April 2005 (SET100 Index), which are the respective dates that the two indices were first published and were set to a base value of 1000 points. The base market value is continually adjusted to correspond to changes in the market values of the underlying securities of each index.

== Stock revision ==
The list of component stocks in the SET50 Index and the SET100 Index are revised every six months in order to adjust for any unexpected changes that have occurred in the stock market such as new listings or public offerings. After these adjustments are made, stocks that meet the necessary qualifications are then selected to become part of the SET50 Index or the SET100 Index. Stock selection is conducted semi-annually between December 1–31 and June 1–30. During these two periods, The Stock Exchange of Thailand will select stocks based on its pre-stipulated criteria. The revised stock lists for both the SET50 and the SET100 will be announced to the general public as soon as the lists become available. New SET100 and SET50 Indices will take effect on the first trading day in January and July of each year. For every revision, both Index calculations will treat stocks which have been withdrawn as a delisting case and stocks which have been added as a new listing case. Whenever a stock is removed from either or both of the indices, a new stock will be added to replace it and to ensure the uninterruption of the indices. Also, adjustments will be made whenever the market value of a component stock changes due to the conversion of convertible bonds, the exercising of warrants, or new shares are issued for capital increase of the component stock, etc.

== Constituents ==
Constituent companies of the SET50 stock index, as of 2025:

Symbol	Securities Name	Sector
ADVANC	Advanced Info Service	Information & Communication Technology
AOT	Airports of Thailand	Transportation & Logistics
AWC	Asset World Corp	Property Development
BANPU	Banpu	Energy & Utilities
BBL	Bangkok Bank	Banking
BCP	Bangchak Corporation	Energy & Utilities
BDMS	Bangkok Dusit Medical Service	Health Care Services
BEM	Bangkok Expressway and Metro	Transportation & Logistics
BH	Bumrungrad International Hospital	Health Care Services
BJC	Berli Jucker	Commerce
BTS	BTS Group Holdings	Transportation & Logistics
CBG	Carabao Group	Food & Beverages
CCET	Cal-Comp Electronics (Thailand)	Electronic Components
COM7	Com Seven	Commerce
CPALL	CP All	Commerce
CPF	Charoen Pokphand Foods	Food & Beverages
CPN	Central Pattana	Property Development
CRC	Central Retail Corporation	Commerce
DELTA	Delta Electronics (Thailand)	Electronic Components
EGCO	Electricity Generating	Energy & Utilities
GPSC	Global Power Synergy	Energy & Utilities
GULF	Gulf Development	Energy & Utilities
HMPRO	Home Product Center	Commerce
IVL	Indorama Ventures	Petrochemicals & Chemicals
KBANK	Kasikornbank	Banking
KCE	KCE Electronics	Electronic Components
KKP	Kiatnakin Phatra Bank	Banking
KTB	Krungthai Bank	Banking
KTC	Krungthai Card	Finance & Securities
LH	Land and Houses	Property Development
MINT	Minor International	Food & Beverage
MTC	Muangthai Capital	Finance & Securities
OR	PTT Oil and Retail Business	Energy & Utilities
OSP	Osotspa	Food & Beverage
PTT	PTT	Energy & Utilities
PTTEP	PTT Exploration and Production	Energy & Utilities
PTTGC	PTT Global Chemical	Petrochemicals & Chemicals
RATCH	Ratch Group	Energy & Utilities
SCB	Siam Commercial Bank	Banking
SCC	Siam Cement Group	Construction Materials
SCGP	SCG Packaging	Packaging
TCAP	Thanachart Capital	Banking
TIDLOR	Tidlor Holdings	Finance & Securities
TISCO	Tisco Financial Group	Banking
TLI	Thai Life Insurance	Insurance
TOP	Thai Oil	Energy & Utilities
TRUE	TRUE Corporation	Information & Communication Technology
TTB	TMBThanachart Bank	Banking
TU	Thai Union Group	Food & Beverages
VGI	VGI	Media & Publishing
WHA	WHA Corporation	Property Development
