= Thai Oil =

Thai public company

Thaioil
- Native name: ไทยออยล์
- Type: Public
- Traded as: SET: TOP
- ISIN: TH0796010005
- Industry: Oil and Gas
- Founded: 3 August 1961; 65 years ago
- Headquarters: Bangkok, Thailand
- Area served: Thailand
- Key people: Bandhit Thamprajamchit (President & CEO)
- Revenue: ▼390,090 million baht (2014)
- Net income: ▼ (4,026) million baht (2014)
- Total assets: ▼192,802 million baht (2014)
- Parent: PTT Group
- Website: Official website

Thai Oil Public Company Limited or simply Thaioil (Thai: ไทยออยล์) is a Thai public company. It is listed on the Stock Exchange of Thailand (SET). It is a subsidiary of PTT Group. The company was founded on 3 August 1961 as Oil Refinery, Ltd.

Thaioil is the largest oil refinery in Thailand.
