= TPI Polene =

Thai cement manufacturer

- Company type: Public
- Traded as: SET: TPIPL
- ISIN: TH0212A10Z07
- Industry: Construction material
- Founded: 24 September 1987; 38 years ago
- Founder: Prachai Leophai-ratana
- Headquarters: Sathon, Bangkok, Thailand
- Area served: Thailand
- Products: Cement
- Website: www.tpipolene.co.th/en/

TPI Polene Public Company Limited is Thailand's third largest cement manufacturer. It also manufactures petrochemicals, including low-density polyethylene (LDPE) and ethylene-vinyl acetate copolymer (EVA).

The company was founded in 1987. Its subsidiary TV Topnotch Production Co., Ltd. owns Thai TV channel Suwannabhumi TV.
