= Land and Houses =

Thai real-estate based company

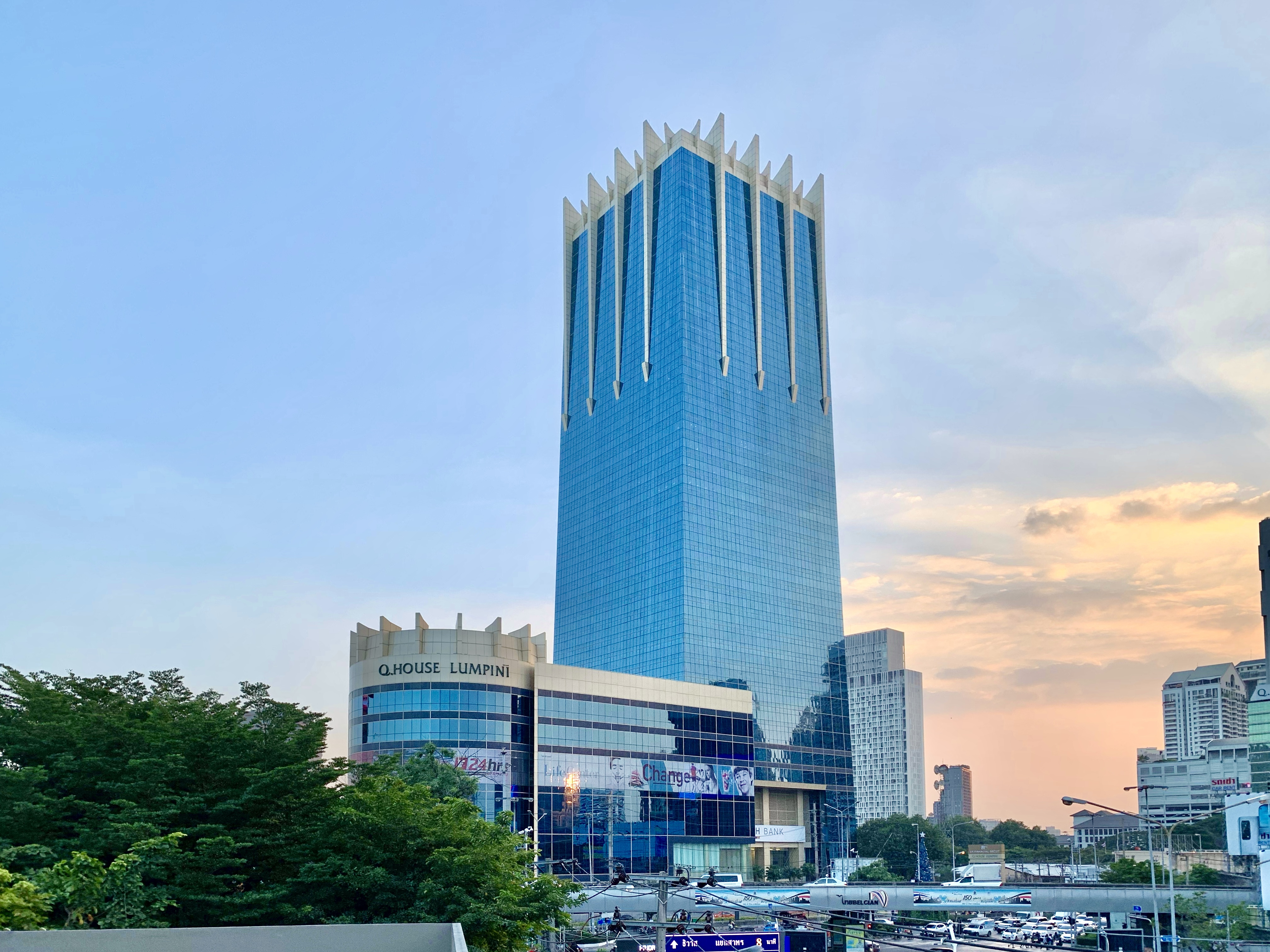
- Company type: Public
- Traded as: SET: LH
- ISIN: TH0143010Z08
- Industry: Property Development
- Founded: 30 August 1983; 42 years ago
- Founder: Piangjai Hanpanich
- Headquarters: Bangkok, Thailand
- Revenue: ▲$959.7 million USD (2014)
- Net income: ▲$236.7 million USD (2014)
- Total assets: ▲$2.4 billion USD (2014)
- Total equity: ▲$1.2 billion USD (2014)
- Website: www.lh.co.th

Land and Houses Public Company Limited (also known as Land and Houses) is a large real-estate based company in Thailand. It was established in 1983 by Ms Piangjai Harnpanij and her son, Mr Anant Asavabhokhin. The company became listed on the Stock Exchange of Thailand in 1991. As of end 2019, Mr Anant Asavabhokin and his family comprised the largest shareholder group, holding 30.73% of the shares.
