= Stock Exchange of Thailand =

National stock exchange of Thailand, located in Bangkok

The Stock Exchange of Thailand
- SET ตลาดหลักทรัพย์แห่งประเทศไทย

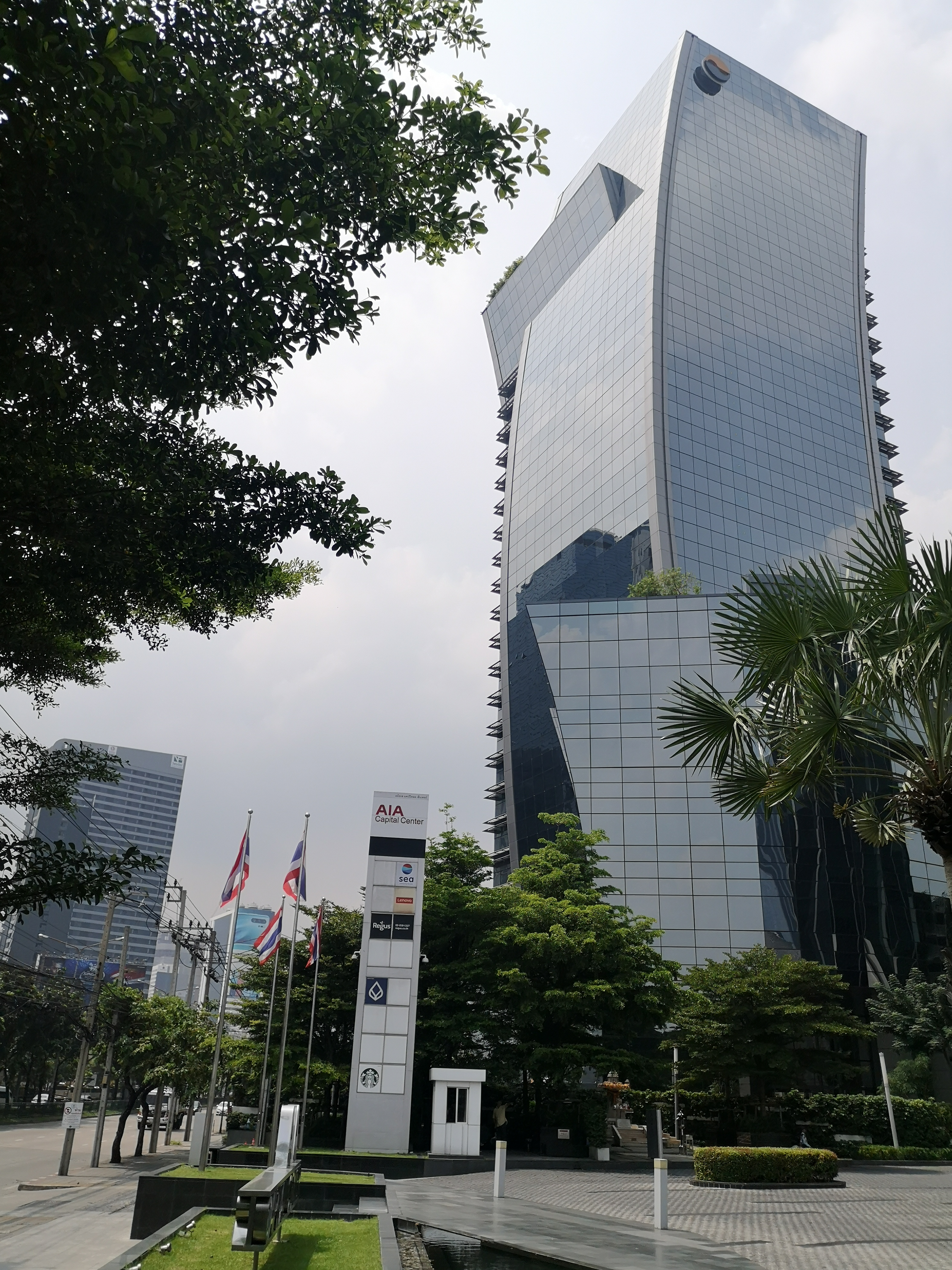
- Type: Stock exchange
- Location: Bangkok, Thailand
- Coordinates: 13.763738°N 100.56737°E
- Founded: 30 April 1975; 51 years ago
- Key people: Kitipong Urapeepatanapong (chair); Asadej Kongsiri (president)
- Currency: Thai baht
- No. of listings: 858 (total listed companies)
- Market cap: 13,156,129.53 million baht for SET (index= 1,062.78) and 218,050.02 million for mai (index= 222.16) (23 June 2025)
- Indices: SET Index; SET50 Index and SET100 Index, mai index
- Website: www.set.or.th

The Stock Exchange of Thailand (Thai: ตลาดหลักทรัพย์แห่งประเทศไทย, RTGS: Talard Lagsap Haeng Prathet Thai [ta.làːt.làk.sáp.hɛ̀ŋ.pra.tʰêt.tʰāj]; abbr. SET) has been the sole stock exchange operator in Thailand since its establishment on 30 April 1975. As of 8 April 2025, with a market capitalization of US$380.19 billion (excluding mai) at an exchange rate of 1 USD = 34.94 THB, it ranks as the 25th largest in the world and the 3rd largest in ASEAN, following the Indonesia Stock Exchange and the Singapore Exchange. In comparison, Thailand ranks 20th in the world and 4th in ASEAN in terms of population.

Its market capitalization is about 69% of Thailand's GDP as of 8 April 2025. In comparison, the market cap of the S&P 500 is roughly 1.5 to 1.7 times the size of the US GDP. Its market capitalization represents about 0.3% of the total market capitalization of all publicly traded stocks worldwide.

The Thai stock market experienced a surge of domestic capital inflows from late 2000s to early 2020s despite signs of sluggish economy. It has undergone a valuation reset.

== Overview ==
The SET is composed of four markets:

- Three equity exchanges
  - The Main Market (SET), the dominant market operating since 1975 with 98% of all market cap (established 1975)
  - The Market for Alternative Investment (mai), for small to medium-sized enterprises (SMEs) (established 1992)
  - The LiVe Exchange (LiVEx) for certain SMEs and startups, with lower listing requirements than mai (established 2022)
- One derivatives exchange:
  - The Thailand Futures Exchange (TFEX) (established 2004)

There are 858 listed companies as of 12 June 2025 (excluding LiVe Exchange): 633 companies on the main exchange and 225 on mai. There are 7 companies traded on the LiVe Exchange.

As of August 2021, the Thai bourse attracted investors from 124 countries, up from 116 the previous year. The top ten nationalities' holdings of Thai stocks amounted to US$147.5 billion (THB 4.77 trillion), accounting for 93.7 percent of all foreign stock ownership. The rank of the first seven nationalities remained unchanged from the previous year: the UK, Singapore, Hong Kong, Switzerland, the US, Japan, and Mauritius.

Currently, the exchange has no foreign listings, but investors can participate overseas through depository receipts (DRs), which have been available since 2018. DRs have the potential to become a significant growth driver for the Stock Exchange of Thailand.

To attract foreign investors and encourage cross-investment within ASEAN, exchanges in the region co-operate to facilitate investing in Indonesia, Malaysia, the Philippines, Singapore, Thailand, and Vietnam. Other ASEAN countries, namely Cambodia, Laos, and Myanmar also have exchanges, with the exception of Brunei.

== History ==
Bangkok Stock Exchange, unrelated to the Stock Exchange of Thailand, was established in July 1962 as a private entity. It did not attract a lot of attention and finally ceased operations in the early 1970s.

In 1972, the Thai government took a step in creating a capital market. The changes extended government control and regulation over the operations of finance and securities companies, which until then had operated fairly freely. By 1975, the basic legislative framework was in place and on 30 April 1975, the Securities Exchange of Thailand officially started trading. On 1 January 1991 the name was formally changed to the Stock Exchange of Thailand (SET).

The Thailand Futures Exchange (TFEX), a subsidiary of the SET, was established on 17 May 2004 as a derivatives exchange. On 28 April 2006 SET50 Index Futures was launched as the first product. Single Stock Futures was first launched on 24 November 2008. Derivative warrant was launched on 9 July 2009.

In 2008, the Securities and Exchange Commission of Thailand (SEC), together with the Bank of Thailand, allowed domestic individual investors to invest abroad directly for the first time through a Thai brokerage. Previously, only institutions could invest overseas.

SET began fully computerized trading in April 1991. Trading through mobile device began in 2010 with the launch of Settrade streaming for iPhone.

== Trading ==
Algorithmic trading value has climbed to about half of total trading value. The dominance of sophisticated algorithms might disadvantage retail investors or smaller players who cannot compete technologically, potentially leading to perceptions of an uneven playing field.

The system enables brokers to display their buying or selling interests by posting bid or offer prices. Members may engage in direct negotiations with one another, either on behalf of clients or for their own accounts. During these negotiations, prices can be adjusted, meaning the final execution price may differ from the initially advertised price and may not adhere to standard price spread rules. Once a transaction is completed, dealers are required to submit the trade details for official recording.

The exchange has implemented measures to reduce market volatility. It limits daily stock price movements to within ±30%. At a period of heightened volatility, daily price movements are further reduced to ±15%. Short-selling is temporarily permitted only at prices above the last traded price.

== Indices ==
The SET index is the most commonly used benchmark for Thai stocks. Its intraday all-time high was 1,852.51 on 27 February 2018, surpassing the previous high of 1,789.16 on 5 January 1994.

=== Lows of SET Index ===
Events	Intraday or closing low	
Numerical low	76.43	17 March 1976
1997 Asian financial crisis	204.59	4 September 1998
Subprime mortgage crisis	380.05	26 November 2008
2020 stock market crash	969.08	13 March 2020
2018 peak to 2025 trough	1,053.79	23 June 2025

The SET index is experiencing a 7-year downtrend from a peak of 1,852.51 in 2018 to 1,053.79 (intraday) on 23 June 2025, a drop of almost 800 points.

In the 2020 stock market crash, the SET index dropped below 900 intraday but rebounded rapidly.

The peak of the SET Index was 924.70 in November 2007 before the subprime crisis.

SET50 and SET100 are two indices featuring the top 50 and 100 companies by market capitalization and liquidity. They help investors identify leading blue-chip companies.

== Listed securities ==
In the first day of trading, there were 8 listed companies and 5 of them still remain: BBL, BJC, DUSIT, SCC, and TCAP.

Today, a large portion of cross-border investment is passive, flowing in or out based on index inclusion, particularly MSCI World. This means MSCI rebalancing dates now tend to have higher volatility and volume in Thai stocks.

Number of Thai Listed Companies in the MSCI Global Standard Index
Year	Number	add	delete
2019	40		
2020	42		
2021	42		
2022	42		
2023	38		
2024	27		
May 2025	21		
Feb 2026	18		cpaxt

ADVANC AOT BDMS BH CPALL CPAXT CPF CPN DELTA GULF HMPRO KBANK KTB MINT OR PTT PTTEP SCB SCC TRUE TTB

deletions: BEM, CRC, KTC

There are 119 DR as of 11 June 2025: 1. E1VFVN3001 which tracks VN30 Index 2. BABA80 3. FUEVFVND01 4. TENCENT80 5. NDX01 which tracks Nasdaq-100 6. STAR5001 7. XIAOMI80 8. BYDCOM80 9. AAPL80X 10.TSLA80X 11.CNTECH01 12.PINGAN80

Since 6 May 2025, DR with underlying European and US stocks or indices can be traded in night session (7:00 PM – 3:00 AM).

CHINA is an ETF which tracks CSI 300 Index. So far it is the only ETF which invests overseas.

== Tick sizes ==
Minimum price movements
Price		Tick size
From	Up to less than	Tick size
—	2	0.01
2	5	0.02
5	10	0.05
10	25	0.10
25	100	0.25
100	200	0.50
200	400	1.00
400	—	2.00

== Valuation ==
As of 13 June 2025, index-level EPS of the SET index is 73.81; EPS of mai is 3.88.

Index-level book value of the SET index is 1,058.15. The ROE of the SET Index is approximately 6.71%.

The index’s earnings per share (EPS)—a core driver of long-term stock market performance—has barely increased for over a decade.

Despite the current 7-year downtrend (2018- 2025), the SET index's current P/E ratio (15.3 as of 12 June 2025) is slightly below its rolling 20-year average (15.67 with standard deviation= 2.61). If a P/E ratio drops to 13.06 (20-year average- 1SD), the market can be seen to complete its valuation reset.

== Performance ==
Historically, the SET experienced significant growth in the 2000s and early 2010s, but has underperformed relative to regional peers such as Vietnam and Indonesia in more recent years.

The SET index has tumbled more than 16% in 1Q25, making it the world's worst performer among 92 indices tracked by Bloomberg.

In November 2024, Goldman Sachs downgraded Thai stocks, citing poor economic growth and high valuations.

Foreign investors have continued to divest from Thai stocks, contributing to the index's underperformance. As of 30 May 2025, foreign investors have recorded net sales of Thai equities totaling 71,605.93 million baht year-to-date.

There has also been a trend of increasing offshore investment by Thai investors.

== Structural challenges ==
From 2013 to 2024, Thailand's average growth rate was 1.9%, lagging significantly behind Malaysia (4.2%), Indonesia (4.4%), and Vietnam (nearly 6%).

Thailand’s transition to a new economy—encompassing technology, innovation, and high-value industries—has lagged behind.

From the second half of 2010s, the stock market has revealed several warning signs: declining market breadth, an unexpected rise of certain sectors such as electric utilities and hospitals. Telecom and banking outperformed the SET index until recently.

While the number of stock listings has risen considerably, many of these have been legacy firms or spin-offs from existing listed companies, rather than dynamic new entrants. Mergers and acquisitions have been prevalent, reflecting limited opportunities. Although some new companies have entered the market, they are typically small and have contributed little to the broader movement of the SET index. In recent years, the exchange has seen very few sizable newly listed companies that have performed well, and it has become increasingly difficult to find such companies to list on the exchange.

The market could do more to improve its products such as faster delisting of non-performing or non-compliant companies.

== See also ==
- ASEAN Exchanges
- List of ASEAN stock exchanges by market capitalization
