= Ratanarak family =

Thai Chinese business family

Ratanarak รัตนรักษ์ Saelee
- Parent family: Li family
- Current region: Bangkok
- Origin: Shantou, Guangdong, China
- Founded: 1926
- Founder: Chuan Ratanarak
- Current head: Krit Ratanarak
- Heirlooms: Bangkok Broadcasting & Television

The Ratanarak family (Thai: รัตนรักษ์) is a Chinese-Thai business family, which has extensive holdings in multiple industries. The family was founded by Chuan Ratanarak, who immigrated to Thailand in 1926 at the age of six. He founded the Bank of Ayudhya (Krungsri Bank), Siam City Cement and Bangkok Broadcasting & TV (Channel 7). The Ratanarak family have substantial holdings in a number of Thai-based companies, including Allianz Ayudhya Capital, Matching Maximize Solution, Media Studio, Grand Canal Land, Eastern Star Real Estate, and HR Pro Security and Services.

Chuan's son Krit inherited the leadership of these companies, and Krit's son Chachchon is founder of the Tonson Group, the family's investment arm.

== People ==
People with the surname Ratanarak include:

- Chachchon Ratanarak (born 1972), Thai businessman
- Chuan Ratanarak (1920–1993), Thai businessman
- Krit Ratanarak (born 1946), Thai businessman
