= Thai Chinese =

Ethnic group in Thailand

泰国华人 ไทยเชื้อสายจีน
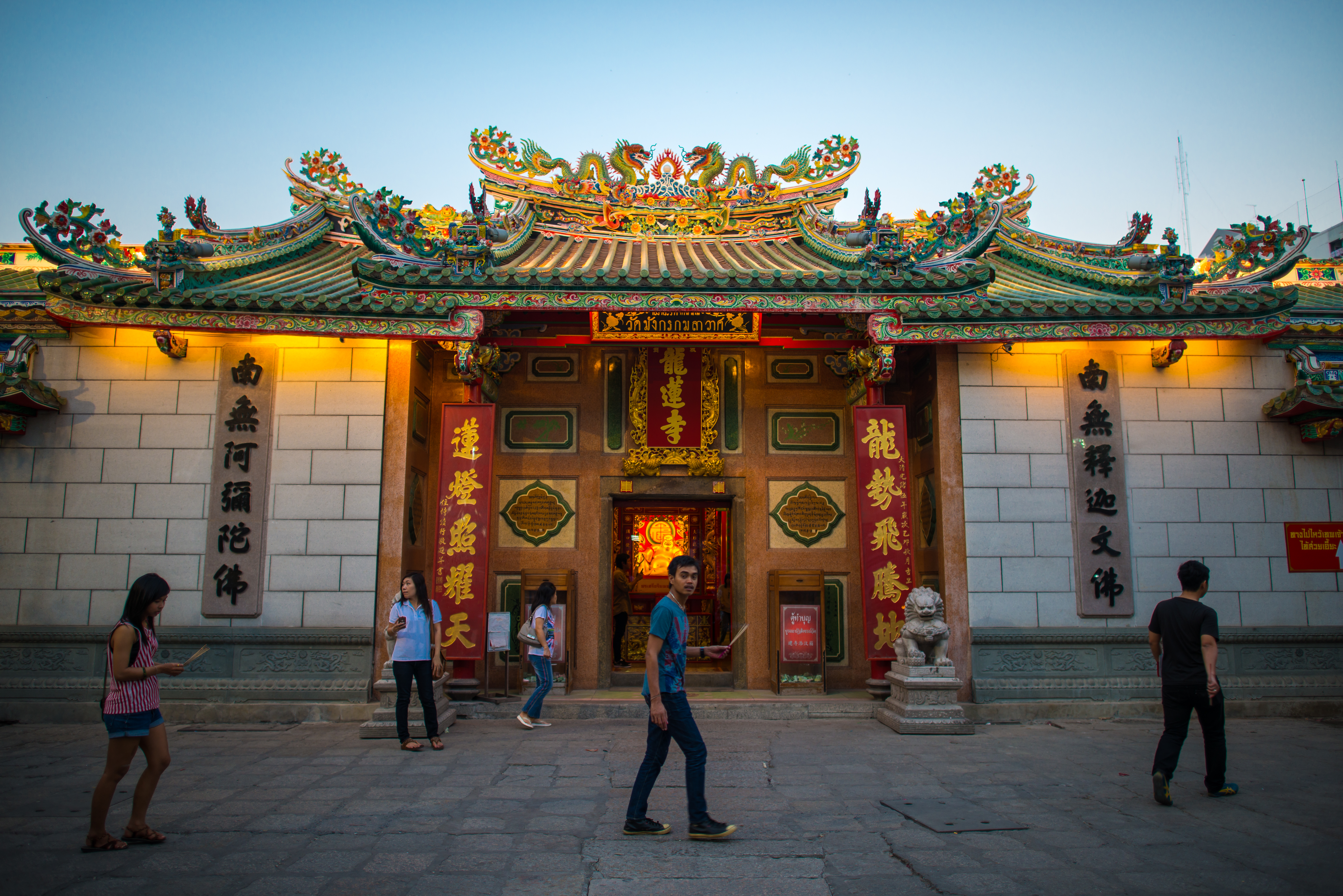
- Wat Mangkon Kamalawat, a Chinese Buddhist temple in Thailand

Total population
- c. 9.3–10 million (Chinese ethnicity or descent); 13.2% of the Thai population (2013)

Regions with significant populations
- Thailand
- 9.3–10 million (2013) country-wide, with significant diaspora in: Australia; United States; New Zealand; Canada; Taiwan; Malaysia; United Kingdom; Singapore

Languages
- Primary languages: Thai (dominant); Mother-Tongue languages: Chinese Language: Teochew (historically), Hokkien, Hakka, Cantonese, Hainanese & Mandarin

Religion
- Predominantly; Theravada Buddhism, Chinese folk religion Minorities; Agnostic, Christianity, Confucianism, Mahayana Buddhism (Chinese Buddhism), Taoism

Related ethnic groups
- Thais; Peranakans; Overseas Chinese; Han Chinese

Thai Chinese
- Traditional Chinese: 泰國華人 / 華裔泰國人
- Simplified Chinese: 泰国华人 / 华裔泰国人
Transcriptions
Standard Mandarin
- Hanyu Pinyin: Huáyì Tàiguórén
Yue: Cantonese
- Jyutping: Waa4 Jeoi6 Taai3 Gwok3 Jan4
Southern Min
- Hokkien POJ: Hôa-è Thài-kok-lâng
- Tâi-lô: Huâ-è Thài-kok-lâng
- Teochew Peng'im: Huê ^{1} i^{6} tai^{3} gog^{4} nang^{5}

Thai Chinese, also known as Chinese Thais or Sino-Thais, are Thai citizens of Chinese ethnicity or ancestry. They form the largest mixed-ethnic group in Thailand and the largest overseas Chinese community in the world, ahead of the neighbouring Malaysian Chinese population. As of 2012, the Thai Chinese population stood at approximately 9.5 million people, accounting for 11 to 14 per cent of the country's total population. It is also one of the oldest and most prominently integrated overseas Chinese communities, with a history dating back to the 1100s. Slightly more than half of the ethnic Chinese population in Thailand trace their ancestry to Chaoshan, proven by the prevalence of the Teochew dialect among the Chinese community in Thailand as well as other Chinese languages. The term as commonly understood signifies those whose ancestors immigrated to Thailand before 1949.

The Thai Chinese have been deeply ingrained into all elements of Thai society over the past 200 years. The present Thai royal family, the Chakri dynasty, was founded by King Rama I who himself was partly Chinese. His predecessor, King Taksin of the Thonburi Kingdom, was the son of a Chinese father from Chaoshan. With the successful integration of historic Chinese immigrant communities in Thailand, a significant number of Thai Chinese are the descendants of intermarriages between ethnic Chinese and native Thais. Many of these descendants have assimilated into Thai society and self-identify solely as Thai.

The Thai Chinese are well-established in the middle class and upper classes of Thai society and are well represented at all levels of Thai society. They play a leading role in Thailand's business sector and dominate the Thai economy today. In addition, Thai Chinese elites of Thailand have a strong presence in Thailand's political scene with most of Thailand's former Prime Ministers and the majority of parliament having at least some Chinese ancestry. Thai Chinese elites of Thailand are well represented among Thailand's rulers and other sectors.

== Demographics ==
Thailand has the largest overseas Chinese community in the world outside Greater China. 11 to 14 percent of Thailand's population are considered ethnic Chinese.

== Official status ==
=== Etymology ===
Thailand's policy never recognize Thai Chinese as a separate ethnicity, based on the principle of considering all Tai groups living in Thailand as part of the Central Thai people. By endonym, with partial success, now Thai Chinese refer themselves as chao thai (Thai: ชาวไทย, IPA: [tɕʰaːw tʰaj]), however, the term often creates ambiguity among the various Tai groups in the country, especially the Siamese Thai who also call themselves the same, these groups Thai Chinese refer as khon phak klang (Thai: คนภาคกลาง, lit: Central Thai people) or khon tai (Thai: คนใต้, lit: Southern Thai people).

In cases where details are required, Thai Chinese people refer to themselves as khon thai chuea sai chin (Thai: คนไทยเชื้อสายจีน, lit: Thai of Chinese origin), or sometimes may refer to the ancestral lands as khon krung thep (Thai: คนกรุงเทพ, lit: Krungthepian, Bangkoker) or khon chon bu ri (Thai: คนชลบุรี, lit: Chonburian), which well known that the Central Thais (Siamese) and Mons were not indigenous to these two provinces but recent internal migration, Bangkok and Chonburi. The term Krungthepians still pinned a resentful connotation towards Central Thais, when Krungthep accent is considered as prestige dialect of Central Thai language, while the Central Thai language of Central Thai people is considered an inappropriate language, known as ner (Thai: เหน่อ).

=== Identity ===
For assimilated second and third generation descendants of Chinese immigrants, it is principally a personal choice whether or not to identify themselves as ethnic Chinese. Nonetheless, nearly all Thai Chinese solely self-identify as Thai, due to their close integration and successful assimilation into Thai society. G. William Skinner observed that the level of assimilation of the descendants of Chinese immigrants in Thailand disproved the "myth about the 'unchanging Chinese'", noting that "assimilation is considered complete when the immigrant's descendant identifies himself in almost all social situations as a Thai, speaks Thai language habitually and with native fluency, and interacts by choice with Thai more often than with Chinese." Skinner believed that the assimilation success of the Thai Chinese was a result of the wise policy of the Thai rulers who, since the 17th century, allowed able Chinese tradesmen to advance their ranks into the kingdom's nobility. The rapid and successful assimilation of the Thai Chinese has been celebrated by the Chinese descendants themselves, as evident in contemporary literature such as the novel Letters from Thailand (Thai: จดหมายจากเมืองไทย) by Botan.

Today, the Thai Chinese constitute a significant part of the royalist/nationalist movements. When prime minister Thaksin Shinawatra, who is Thai Chinese, was ousted from power in 2006, it was Sondhi Limthongkul, another prominent Thai Chinese businessman, who formed and led the People's Alliance for Democracy (PAD) movement to protest the successive governments run by Thaksin's allies. Sondhi accused Thaksin of corruption based on improper business ties between Thaksin's corporate empire and the Singapore-based Temasek Holdings. The Thai Chinese in and around Bangkok were also the main participants of the months-long political campaign against the government of Thaksin's sister Yingluck Shinawatra between November 2013 and May 2014, which culminated in the 2014 Thai coup d'état.

== History ==
=== First wave (Before 1767) ===
Traders from China began arriving in Ayutthaya by at least the 12th century. In the 1420s, Chinese merchants were involved in the construction of the major Ayutthaya temple Wat Ratchaburana and left several Chinese inscriptions and cultural objects within the temple's crypt, including the inscribing of several Chinese family names. According to the Chronicles of Ayutthaya, Ekathotsarot (r. 1605–1610) had been "concerned solely with ways of enriching his treasury," and was "greatly inclined toward strangers and foreign nations".

Following the Qing revocation of the private trade ban in 1684, Chinese immigration to Siam steadily increased, particularly following the massive Southern Chinese famines of the early 18th century. Approximately 20,000 Chinese lived in Siam in the 1730s (Note: According to a French missionary.) and were prominent in the city of Ayutthaya and were a prominent faction within the Siamese court by 1767.

=== Second wave (1767–1911) ===
When King Taksin, himself the son of a Chinese immigrant, ruled Thailand, King Taksin actively encouraged Chinese immigration and trade. Chinese settlers came to Siam in large numbers. Immigration continued over the following years, and the Chinese population in Thailand jumped from 230,000 in 1825 to 792,000 by 1910. By 1932, approximately 12.2 percent of the population of Thailand was Chinese.

The early Chinese immigration consisted almost entirely of men who did not bring women. Therefore, it became common for male Chinese immigrants to marry local Thai women. The children of such relationships were called Sino-Thai or luk-jin (ลูกจีน) in Thai. These Chinese-Thai intermarriages declined somewhat in the early 20th century, when significant numbers of Chinese women also began immigrating to Thailand.

Economic recession and unemployment forced many men to leave China for Thailand in search of work to seek wealth. If successful, they sent money back to their families in China. Many Chinese immigrants prospered under the "tax farming" system, whereby private individuals were sold the right to collect taxes at a price below the value of the tax revenues.

The local Chinese community had long dominated domestic commerce and had served as agents for royal trade monopolies. With the rise of European economic influence, however, many Chinese shifted to opium trafficking and tax collecting, both of which were despised occupations.

From 1882 to 1917, nearly 13,000 to 34,000 Chinese legally entered Thailand per year, mostly settling in Bangkok and along the coast of the Gulf of Siam. They predominated in occupations requiring arduous labor, skills, or entrepreneurship. They worked as blacksmiths, railroad labourers and rickshaw pullers. While most Thais were engaged in rice production, the Chinese brought new farming ideas and new methods to supply labor on its rubber plantations, both domestically and internationally. However, republican ideas brought by the Chinese were considered seditious by the Thai government. For example, a translation of Chinese revolutionary Sun Yat-sen's Three Principles of the People was banned under the Communism Act of 1933. The government had regulated Chinese schools even before compulsory education was established in the country, starting with the Private Schools Act of 1918. This act required all foreign teachers to pass a Thai language test and for principals of all schools to implement standards set by the Thai Ministry of Education.

=== Third wave (1911–1949) ===
Legislation by King Rama VI (1910–1925) that required the adoption of Thai surnames was largely directed at the Chinese community as a number of ethnic Chinese families left Burma between 1930 and 1950 and settled in the Ratchaburi and Kanchanaburi Provinces of western Thailand. A few of the ethnic Chinese families in that area had already emigrated from Burma in the 19th century.

The Chinese in Thailand also suffered discrimination between the 1930s and 1950s under the military dictatorship of Prime Minister Plaek Phibunsongkhram (in spite of having part-Chinese ancestry himself), which allied itself with the Empire of Japan. The Primary Education Act of 1932 made the Thai language the compulsory medium of education, but as a result of protests from Thai Chinese, by 1939, students were allowed two hours per week of Mandarin instruction. State corporations took over commodities such as rice, tobacco, and petroleum and Chinese businesses found themselves subject to a range of new taxes and controls. By 1970, more than 90 percent of the Chinese ancestry born in Thailand never have Chinese or Taiwanese nationality with Thai only nationality instead. In 1975, diplomatic relations were established with China.

== Culture ==
Han Chinese intermarriage with ethnic Thais has resulted in many modern Thais who have claimed distant Chinese ancestry. Thais of Chinese descent are concentrated in the coastal areas of the country, principally Bangkok. Considerable segments of Thailand's academic, business, and political elites are of Chinese descent.

The influence of Chinese cuisine on Thai cuisine as a whole has been profound, to the point where there is no longer a clear differentiation between Thai Chinese cuisine and native Thai cuisine. Traditional Thai cuisine loosely falls into four categories: tom (boiled dishes), yam (spicy salads), tam (pounded foods), and kaeng (curries). Deep-frying, stir-frying and steaming are methods introduced from Chinese cuisine. The street food culture of much of Southeast Asia was introduced by Chinese immigrants during the late 19th century. As a result, many Thai street foods are derived from or heavily influenced by Chinese cuisine. Street food was commonly sold by the ethnic Chinese population of Thailand and did not become popular among native Thai people until the early 1960s, when the rapid urban population growth stimulated the street food culture, and by the 1970s, it had "displaced home-cooking."

== Language ==
Today, nearly all Thai with Chinese ancestry speak Central Thai exclusively (even in Isan, Northern Thailand and Southern Thailand as well). (Note: In Southern Thai, ethnic Chinese are known as Leangkaluang (Southern Thai: แหลงข้าหลวง lit:Central Thai speakers).) Only elderly Chinese immigrants still speak their native varieties of Chinese. The rapid and successful assimilation of Thai Chinese has been celebrated in contemporary literature such as "Letters from Thailand" (Thai: จดหมายจากเมืองไทย) by a Thai Chinese author Botan. In the modern Thai language there are many signs of Chinese influence. In the 2000 census, 231,350 people identified themselves as speakers of a variant of Chinese (Teochew, Hakka, Hainanese, Hokkien or Cantonese). The Teochew dialect has served as the language of Bangkok's influential Chinese merchants' circles since the foundation of the city in the 18th century. Although Chinese language schools were closed during the nationalist period before and during the Second World War, the Thai government never tried to suppress Chinese cultural expression. Today, businesses in Yaowarat Road and Charoen Krung Road in Bangkok's Samphanthawong District which constitute the city's "Chinatown" still feature bilingual signs in Chinese and Thai. A number of Chinese words have found their way into the Thai language, especially the names of dishes and foodstuffs, as well as basic numbers (such as those from "three" to "ten") and terms related to gambling.

The rise of China's prominence on the global economic stage has prompted many Thai Chinese business families to see Mandarin as a beneficial asset in partaking in economic links and conducting business between Thailand and mainland China, with some families encouraging their children to learn Mandarin in order to reap the benefits of their ethnic Chinese identity and the increasing role of Mandarin as a prominent language of Overseas Chinese business communities. However, equally there are many Thais, regardless of their ethnic background who study Chinese in order to boost their business and career opportunities, rather than due to reasons of ethnic identity, with some sending their children to newly established Mandarin language schools.

== Trade and industry ==
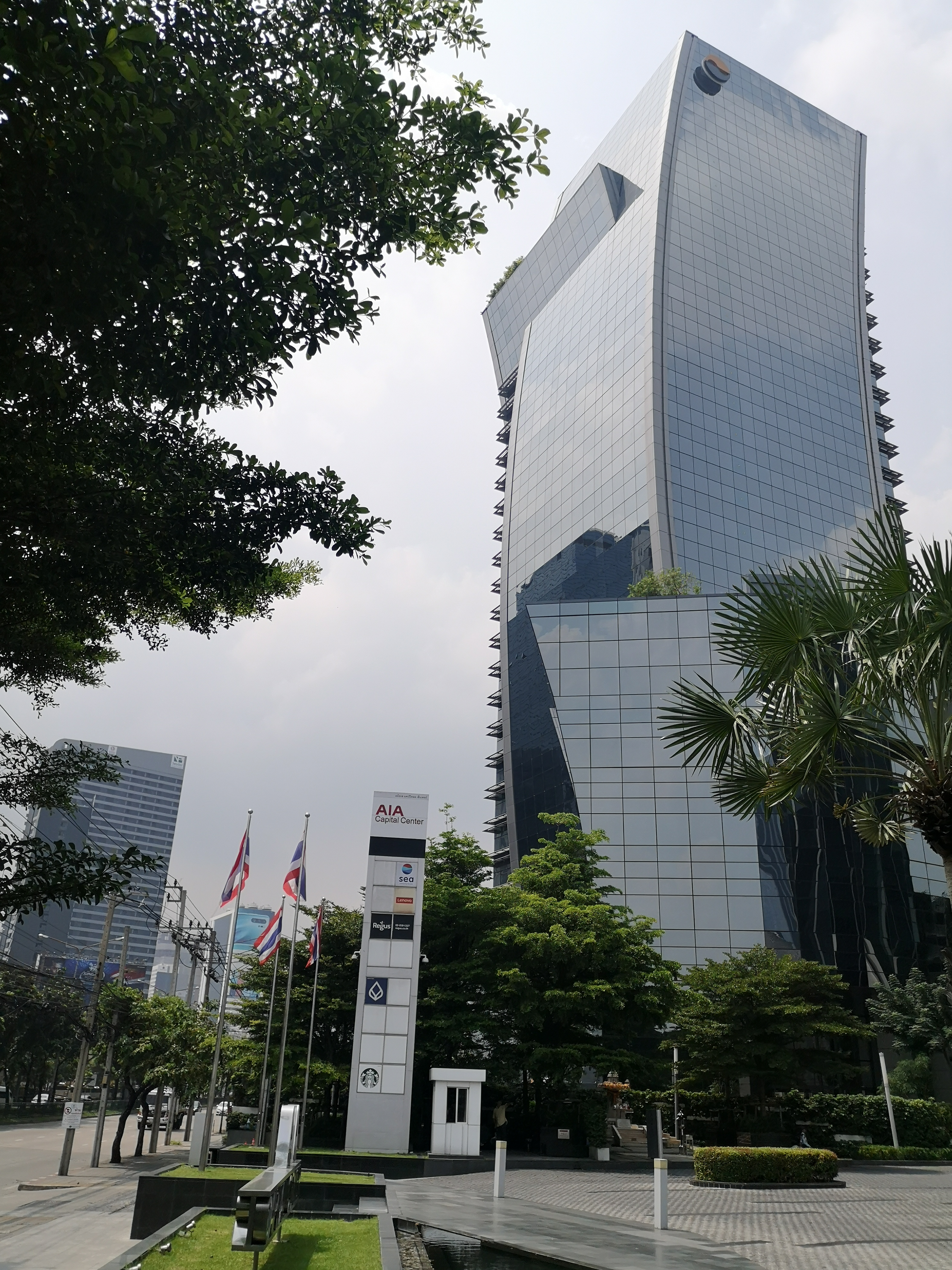
The Stock Exchange of Thailand is now pullulated with a myriad of prospering Chinese-owned businesses. Thai investors of Chinese ancestry dominate the Stock Exchange of Thailand as they are estimated to control more than four-fifths of the publicly listed companies by market capitalization.

The Thai Chinese community has played a major role in the development of Thailand's economy and national private sector. The early-21st century saw Thais of Chinese ancestry dominate Thai commerce at every level of society. Their economic clout plays a critical role in maintaining the country's economic vitality and prosperity. The economic power of the Thai Chinese is far greater than their proportion of the population would suggest. With their powerful economic presence, the Chinese continue to remain a major impetus underpinning the Thailand's commercial undertakings and economic activities and virtually make up the country's entire wealthy elite. Thailand's lack of an indigenous Thai commercial culture led to the private sector being dominated entirely by Thais of Chinese ancestry themselves. Development policies imposed by the Thai government provided business opportunities for the Chinese community, where a distinct Thai Chinese business community has emerged as the country's most dominant economic force, controlling the entirety of the country's major industry sectors across the Thai economy. The Chinese community has remained active in every sector of Thailand's economy such as agriculture (sugar, maize, vegetables, rubber), industrial manufacturing, financial services, real estate, and the retail and whole trading sector. The contemporary Thai business sector is highly dependent on Han Chinese entrepreneurs and investors who control virtually all the country's banks and large corporate conglomerates all the way to the smaller retail hawking outlets at the humbler end of the business spectrum with their support and patronage being augmented by the presence of lawmakers and political operatives, where the vast majority of whom are of pure or partial Chinese ancestry themselves. Thais of Chinese ancestry, a disproportionate wealthy, market-dominant minority not only form a distinct ethnic community, they also form, by and large, an economically advantaged social class: the commercial middle and upper class in contrast to their poorer indigenous Thai majority working and underclass counterparts around them. Highly publicized profiles of wealthy Chinese entrepreneurs and investors attracted great public interest and were used to illustrate the community's strong economic clout. More than 80 percent of the top 40 richest people in Thailand are of pure or partial Chinese ancestry. Of the five billionaires in Thailand in the late-20th century, all of them were of full or at least had partial Han Chinese ancestry.

Amounting to 10 percent of Thailand's population, the Thai Chinese control approximately 85 percent of the nation's entire economy. Thai investors of Chinese ancestry control more than 80 percent of public companies listed on the Thai stock exchange. With 80% of Thailand's market capital under Chinese hands, many Thai entrepreneurs and investors of Chinese ancestry have been at the forefront of the establishing the country's most prominent wholesale trading cooperatives owned by traders, merchants, and brokers flush with private equity and venture capital bearing connections to some of Thailand's wealthiest business families. 10 Thai business families of Chinese ancestry control half of the all corporate assets in the country. 50 Thai business families of Chinese ancestry dominate the Thai corporate landscape, controlling over approximately 81–90% of the total market capitalization in the country's economy.

British East India Company agent John Crawfurd used detailed company records kept on Prince of Wales's Island (present-day Penang) from 1815 to 1824 to report specifically on the economic aptitude of the 8,595 Chinese there as compared to others. He used the data to estimate the Chinese — about five-sixths of whom were unmarried men in the prime of life — "as equivalent to an ordinary population of above 37,000, and...to a numerical Malay population of more than 80,000!". He surmised this and other differences noted as providing, "a very just estimate of the comparative state of civilization among nations, or, which is the same thing, of the respective merits of their different social institutions." In 1879, the Chinese controlled all of the steam-powered rice mills, most of which were sold by the British. Most of the leading businessmen in Thailand at this point in time were of Chinese ancestry and accounted for a significant portion of the Thai upper class. In 1890, despite British shipping domination in Bangkok, Thais of Chinese ancestry conducted 62 percent of the Thai shipping sector, operating as agents for Western shipping lines as well as their own. The Chinese also dominated the rubber industry, market gardening, sugar production, and fish export sectors. In Bangkok, Thais of Chinese ancestry dominate the entertainment and media industries, being the pioneers of Thailand's early publishing houses, newspapers, and film studios. By 1899 in Bangkok, the Chinese owned 18 of the 23 rice mills in the city that produced a capacity of over 100 tons of rice paddies and controlled 56 out of the 66 by 1919.

Thai Chinese moneylenders also wielded considerable economic power over the poorer indigenous Thai peasants, prompting accusations of Chinese bribery of government officials, wars between the Chinese secret societies, and the use of violent tactics to collect taxes. Chinese success served to foster Thai resentment against the Chinese at a time when their community was expanding rapidly. Waves of Han Chinese immigration swept into Siam in the 19th and early-20th centuries, peaking in the 1920s. Whereas Thai Chinese bankers were accused of plunging the Thai peasant into poverty by charging high-interest rates, the reality was that the Thai banking business was highly competitive. Chinese millers and rice traders were blamed for the economic recession that gripped Siam for nearly a decade after 1905. The Chinese then moved into extractive industries such as tin mining, logging and sawmilling, rice milling, as well as the construction of ports and railways that would usher in Thailand's modern transportation industry. Though the Chinese were acknowledged for their industriousness, they were nonetheless scorned by many. In the late 19th century, a British official in Siam said that "the Chinese are the Jews of Siam ... by judicious use of their business faculties and their powers of combination, they hold the Siamese in the palm of their hand." In addition, Chinese millers and rice traders were blamed for an economic recession that gripped Siam for nearly a decade after 1905. Large waves of Han Chinese immigration occurred in the nineteenth and early in the twentieth century, peaking in the 1920s from southern China who was eager to make money and return to their families. By the end of the nineteenth century, the Chinese would lose their control of foreign trade to the European colonial powers and began to act as compradors for Western trading cooperatives. Thais of Chinese ancestry also entered extraction intensive industries such as tin mining, teak-cutting, saw milling, rice-milling, as well as fostered the modernization of the Thai transportation sector through the construction of ports and railways.

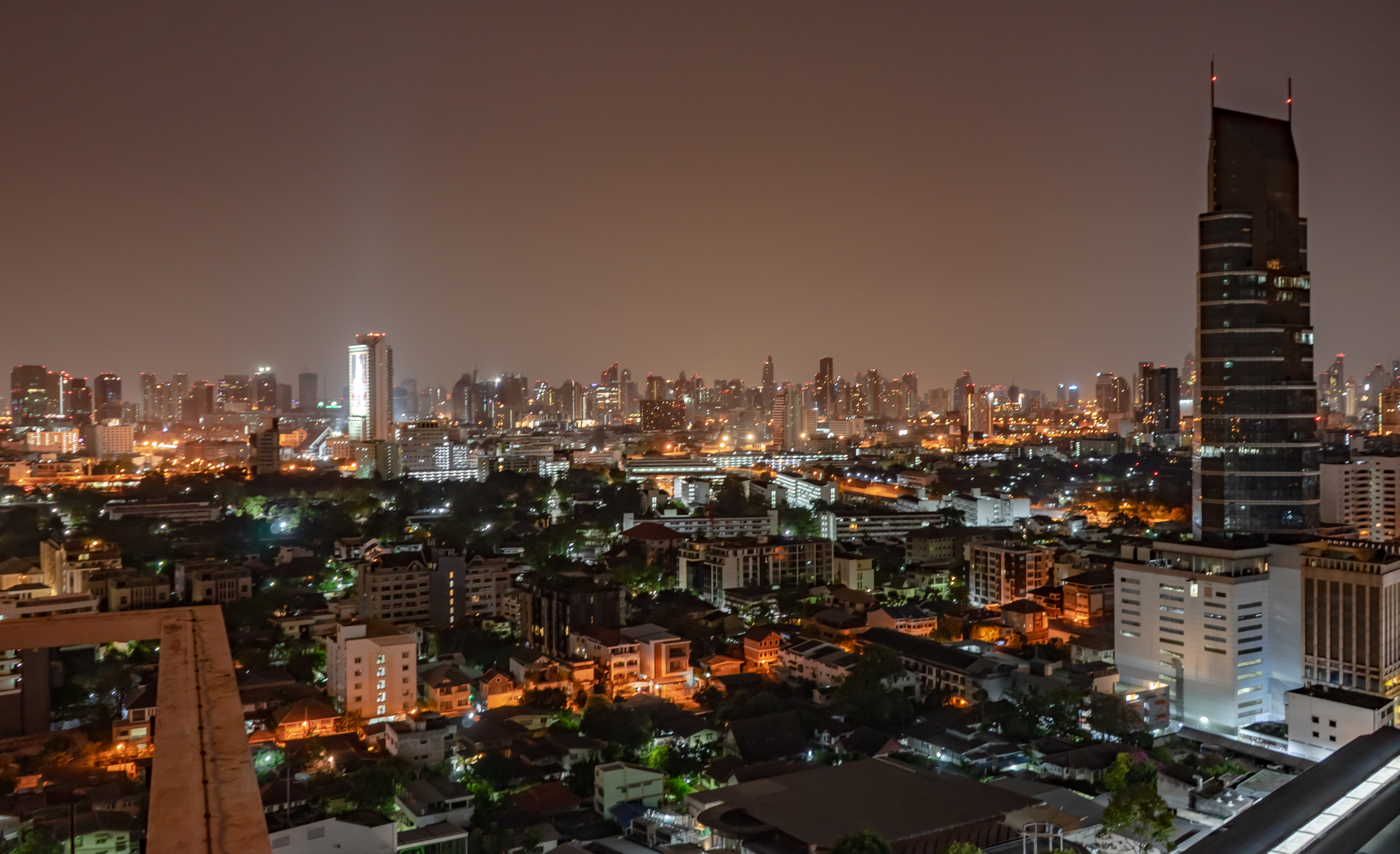
Bangkok continues to serve as Thailand's major financial district and central business networking nucleus for Thai businessmen and investors of Chinese ancestry.

By the early 20th century, the resident Chinese community in Bangkok was sizable, amounting to a third of the capital's population. Anti-Chinese sentiment was rife. In 1914, the Thai nationalist King Rama VI, published a pamphlet in Thai and English—The Jews of the East— employing a pseudonym. In it, he lambasted the Chinese. He described them as "avaricious barbarians who were 'entirely devoid of morals and mercy'." He depicted successful Chinese businessmen as reaping their commercial success at the expense of indigenous Thais, prompting some Thai politicians to blame Thai Chinese businessmen for Thailand's economic woes. Rama VI also implicitly implied that the distinct ethnicity of the Overseas Chinese and their commanding role of Southeast Asia's economy through their commercial businesses have also made them targets of reverse discrimination and resentment by the indigenous Thais and Southeast Asian majorities. King Vajiravudh's views were influential among elite Thais and were quickly adopted by ordinary Thais, fueling their suspicion of and hostility against the Chinese minority. The glaring wealth disparity and the abject poverty of the indigenous Thais resulted in them blaming their socioeconomic ills on the Chinese, especially Chinese moneylenders. Beginning in the late-1930s and recommencing in the 1950s, the Thai government dealt with wealth disparities by pursuing a campaign of forced assimilation achieved through property confiscation, forced expropriation, coercive social policies, and anti-Chinese cultural suppression, seeking to eradicate Han consciousness and identity. Thai Chinese became the targets of state discrimination while indigenous Thais were granted economic privileges. The Siamese revolution of 1932 only coagulated the grip of Thai nationalism, culminating in World War II when Thailand's Japanese ally was at war with China.

After 1947 coup d'état, Thailand was an agrarian economy hobbled by state-owned enterprises. Thais of Chinese ancestry provided the impetus for Thailand's industrialization, transforming the Thai economy into an export-oriented, trade-based economy with a global reach. Over the next several decades, internationalization and capitalist market-oriented policies led to the dramatic emergence of a massive export-oriented, large-scale manufacturing sector, which in turn catapulted Thailand into joining the Tiger Cub Economies. Virtually all the industrial manufacturing and import-export shipping firms establishments including the auto manufacturing behemoth Siam Motors are Chinese controlled. In the years between World War I and World War II, Thailand's major exports, rice, tin, rubber, and timber were under Chinese hands. Despite their small numbers as compared to the indigenous Thai population, the Chinese controlled virtually every line of business, ranging from small retail trade to large industries. Constituting merely ten percent of the population, the Chinese dominated over four-fifths of the country's vital rice, tin, rubber, and timber exports, and virtually controlled the country's entire wholesale and retail trade. By 1924, Thais of Chinese ancestry controlled one-third of all the sawmills in Bangkok. Market gardening, sugar production (The Chinese introduced the sugar industry to Thailand), and fish exporting was also dominated by the Chinese. Virtually all of the newly minted manufacturing establishments were Chinese controlled. Despite failed Thai affirmative action-based policies in the 1930s to economically redestribute the nation's wealth to empower the impoverished indigenous Thai majority, 70 percent of retailing outlets and 80 to 90 percent of rice mills remained Chinese-controlled. A survey of Thailand's roughly seventy most powerful business groups found that all but three were owned by Thai Chinese. Although Bangkok has its own Chinatown, Chinese economic influence is much more pervasive and subtle throughout the city. With Bangkok's Thai Chinese clan associations are prominent throughout the city as the family clans are major property holders and retain ownership of all the non-profit Chinese-operated schools. With Bangkok being the testament that reflected the extent of Chinese influence on Thailand's economic life, virtually all of Bangkok's business elites are of pure Han Chinese or at least of partial Han Chinese ancestry. Thai entrepreneurs and investors of Chinese ancestry who control much of Thai industry, are seen as a wellspring of upfront private equity and venture capital that serve as chief financial backers behind Thailand's latest investment developments including funding Thailand's newest construction projects in addition to financing the country's state-of-the-art telecommunications sector, as Thai entrepreneurs of Chinese ancestry are the key power players behind Thailand's telecommunications industry, being at the forefront of several well-known Thai telecom operators such as the Shinawatra telecommunications group, True Corporation, Jasmine, Ucom, and Samar. Kukrit Pramoj, the aristocratic former prime minister and distant relative of the Thai royal family, once said that most Thais had a Chinese relative "hanging somewhere on their family tree." By the 1930s, the Thai Chinese minority dominated construction, industrial manufacturing, publishing, shipping, finance, commerce, and every industry in the country, minor, and major. Among the minor industries that they presided were food vending, salt, tobacco, port, and bird's nest concessions. Among the major lucrative industries, the Chinese involved in shipping, rice milling, rubber and tin manufacturing, teak logging, and petroleum drilling.

By the late-1950s, Thais of Chinese ancestry accounted for 70 percent of Bangkok's business owners and senior business managers, and 90 percent of the shares in Thai corporations were said to be held by Thai investors of Chinese ancestry. Ninety percent of Thailand's industrial and commercial capital are also held by the Chinese. 90 percent of all investments in the industrial and commercial sector and at least 50 percent of all investments in the banking and financial sectors are controlled by the Chinese. Economic advantages would also persist as Thai rice merchants of Chinese ancestry controlled 80–90 percent of Thailand's rice mills, the largest merchant food enterprises in the nation. Of the 25 leading entrepreneurs in the Thai business sector, 23 are of Han Chinese or at least of partial Han Chinese ancestry. Thais of Chinese ancestry also account for 96 percent of Thailand's 70 most powerful business groups. Family firms are extremely common in the Thai business sector as they are passed down from one generation to the next. 90 percent of Thailand's industrial manufacturing sector and 50 percent of Thailand's service sector are controlled by the Chinese. According to a Financial Statistics of the 500 Largest Public Companies in Asia Controlled by Overseas Chinese in 1994 chart released by Singaporean geographer Dr. Henry Yeung of the National University of Singapore, 39 companies were concentrated in Thailand with a market capitalization of US$35 billion and total assets of US$95 billion. Four prominent Thai business families of Chinese ancestry which are the Sophonpanich, Lamsam, Ratanarak, and Tejapaibul families respectively control Thailand's largest private banks: Bangkok Bank (the largest and most profitable in Southeast Asia), Thai Farmers Bank, and the Bank of Ayudhya. Thais of Chinese ancestry not dominate Thailand's big banking sector, but also the small banking sector presided by a number of Thai business families as well. As there weren't that many alternative sources of capital prior to the establishment of the Thai Stock Exchange for up-and-coming Thai entrepreneurs of Chinese descent to draw upon, Chinese-owned Thai banks wielded enormous economic power in the Thai private business sector throughout the 1960s to the 1980s. Of the 20 Thai banks that were founded in the years between 1930 and 1950, the Thai Chinese were behind the establishment of 14 of them while the remaining 6 banks were established by the Thai Crown Property Bureau. Thai businessmen and investors of Chinese ancestry are influential in the country's real estate, agriculture, banking, and finance, and the wholesale trading industries. In Central Siam, Thai businessmen and investors of Chinese ancestry control the entirety of the area's residential and commercial real estate and raw land. The Thai Chinese (mainly of Yunnanese origin) also taken over Chiangmai's lucrative gem industry and ended up owning much of the city's fruit orchards, restaurants, and retail shops while profiting handsomely off of the city's land boom that occurred throughout the late 1980s. During the 1980s, Thai Chinese business groups dominated 37 of the top 100 corporations in the country, with much of the wealth being centralized within the hands of five Teochew business families. In the 1990s, among the top ten Thai businesses in terms of sales, nine of them were Chinese-owned with only Siam Cement being the sole firm that was under the ownership of a non-Chinese. Following the 1997 Asian financial crisis, structural reforms imposed by the International Monetary Fund (IMF) on Indonesia and Thailand led to the loss of many monopolistic positions long held by the Thai Chinese business elite. In spite of the financial and economic downturn, Thais of Chinese ancestry were still estimated to own 65 percent of the total banking assets, 60 percent of the national trade, 90 percent of all local investments in the commercial sector, 90 percent of all local investments in the manufacturing sector, and 50 percent of all local investments in the banking and financial services sector.

In the urban center of Chiang Saen, a prominent Thai city situated across from Ton Pheung District in the northern part of Laos, the area served as a diverse economic hub for commercial trade among a multitude of merchants hailing from different ethnic backgrounds, engaging in frontier trading activities. During the era of French colonization, Chiang Saen evolved into a crucial focal point through which the French exerted control over commercial transactions along the Mekong River and assumed authoritative control over the land trade pathways connecting Xishuangbanna, Luang Prabang, and the commercial centers of northern Siam. The French utilized Chiang Saen to advance their economic, cultural, and political interests across borders, often in competition with the British, who operated from the Burmese side of the border. British goods dominated markets in Chiang Mai, Kengtung, and Xishuangbanna, while the French played a significant role in the teak, rice, and opium trade, at times collaborating with ethnic-based trading groups in the region. With the decline of European colonial influence, regional trade, particularly in the nearby highlands, fell largely under the control of the Yunnanese. Due to the relaxation of emigration restrictions influenced by economic reform and the implementation of open-border policies by China and Southeast Asian countries, there has been a significant transformation in Chinese out-migration patterns as a result of noticeable decrease in barriers to emigration. This shift has resulted in a notable increase in mainland Chinese migrants relocating to developing nations in Southeast Asia, particularly to Thailand during the 1990s and 2000s. Many of these Chinese immigrants include petty traders, financial middlemen, investors, owners of small to medium-sized enterprises in the formal business sector, shipping agents (some of which have Thai partners), smaller import-export agents, as well as independent traders and intermediaries associated with Chinese enterprises.

For a select few Chinese entrepreneurs, a number of them have ventured into Thailand to explore potential investment prospects in a market that remains largely untapped amidst the intensifying commercial competition back in China. Certain Chinese real estate investors opt to acquire properties, particularly modern townhouses and structures located along the riverside and in market areas. The rationale behind these property investments has varied, as some investors seek to utilize them for personal residential use, while others strive to establish a lasting commercial real estate foothold in the Chiang Saen area for overseas investment purposes. Entrepreneurs operating within the private sector of Chiang Saen vastly outnumber investors, with shipping agents being a prominent group, boasting at least ten registered enterprises situated along the banks of the Chiang Saen river. Many of these entrepreneurs share a common ethnic background, having commenced their business endeavors as small-scale operators whose initial calculated speculations yielded significant dividends within a burgeoning marketplace. This trend was especially pronounced among Chinese merchants who ventured into small-scale agricultural enterprises, such as the trading of longans, durians, mangosteens, oranges, and apples. In addition to those in the shipping industry, some of the original traders have progressed to become wholesalers, operating warehouses along the river to facilitate the distribution of goods to Bangkok and other parts of Thailand. Within the town of Chiang Saen, small-scale entrepreneurs often specialize in the trade of agricultural products through import and export, as a significant number of these entrepreneurs were previously successful traders back in China, but relocated to the border region due to increased competition within their native market. Petty Chinese merchants operating within the town's premises also engage in the sale of imported Chinese fruits and everyday items to both local residents and tourists exploring Chiang Saen. The high saturation of Chinese merchants operating within this sector has fostered a fiercely competitive atmosphere, albeit they are overshadowed by stiff competition from petty Chinese traders offering Chinese goods in the border markets of northern Laos and northern Vietnam, as well as in urban Cambodia.

With the rise of China as a global economic power, Thai businesses under Chinese hands are now contributing larger to opening up the country's economy for foreign direct investment from mainland China and Thai businesses that are Chinese-owned are now the largest sources of investors in mainland China among all overseas Chinese communities worldwide. The influx of Thai Chinese investment capital into mainland China has led to a resurgence of Han Chinese cultural pride among the Thai Chinese community while concurrently pursuing new business and investment opportunities while bringing their influx of foreign capital to create new jobs and economic niches on the mainland. Many Thais of Chinese ancestry have begun to rekindle with their long-lost Han ancestral roots, have sent their children to newly established Chinese language schools, visited China in record numbers, invested money in the mainland Chinese economy, and assumed Chinese surnames alongside their Thai names. The Charoen Pokphand (CP Group), a prominent Chinese-owned Thai conglomerate claiming $9 billion in assets with US$25 billion in annual sales founded by the Chearavanonts, a prominent Thai business family of Chinese ancestry which is one of the most powerful conglomerate companies investing in mainland China today. The conglomerate company is currently the single largest foreign investor in China with over US$1 billion invested with hundreds of businesses across a multivarieted range of industries traversing from agricultural food products, aquaculture, retail, hospitality, and industrial manufacturing while employing more than 150,000 people in mainland China. The company is known in China under well-known household names such as the "Chia Tai Group" and "Zheng Da Ji Tuan". The CP Group also owns and operates Tesco Lotus, one of the largest foreign hypermarket operators with 74 stores and seven distribution centers throughout 30 cities across the mainland. One of CP Group's flagship businesses in China is a US$400 million Super Brand Mall, the largest mall in Shanghai's exclusive Pudong business district. Reignwood Pine Valley, CP also controls Telecom Asia, a prominent telecommunications and mobile phone manufacturing company in a joint venture with British Telecom since making its foray into the Thai telecommunications industry. Mainland China's most exclusive golf and country clubs, were established and owned by a Thai business tycoon of Chinese ancestry, Chanchai Rouyrungruen (operator of Red Bull drink business in China). It is cited as the most popular golf course in Asia. In 2008, Chanchai became the first owner of a business jet in mainland China. Anand's Saha-Union, Thailand's leading industrial group, have so far invested over US$1.5 billion in China, and is operating more than 11 power plants in three of China's provinces. With over other 30 businesses in China, the company employs approximately 7000 Chinese workers. Central Group, Thailand's largest operator of shopping centers (and owner of Italy's leading high-end department store, La Rinascente) with US$3.5 billion in annual sales was established by the Chirathivats, a Thai business family of Chinese ancestry, have created three new large scale department store branches in China.

According to Thai historian, Dr. Wasana Wongsurawat, the Thai political elite has remained in power by employing a simple two-part strategy: first, secure the economic base by cultivating the support of the Thai business elites of Chinese ancestry; second, align with the dominant global geopolitical power of the day. As of 2020, increasingly, that power is China. As the Chinese economic might grew, the indigenous Thai hill tribes and aborigines were gradually driven out into poorer land on the hills, on the rural outskirts of major Thai cities or into the mountains. The increased economic clout wielded by Thai Chinese has triggered distrust, resentment, and Anti-Chinese sentiment among the poorer working and underclass indigenous Thai majority, many of whom engage in rural agrarian rice peasantry in stark socioeconomic contrast to their modern, wealthier, and cosmopolitan middle and upper class Chinese counterparts.

== Religion ==
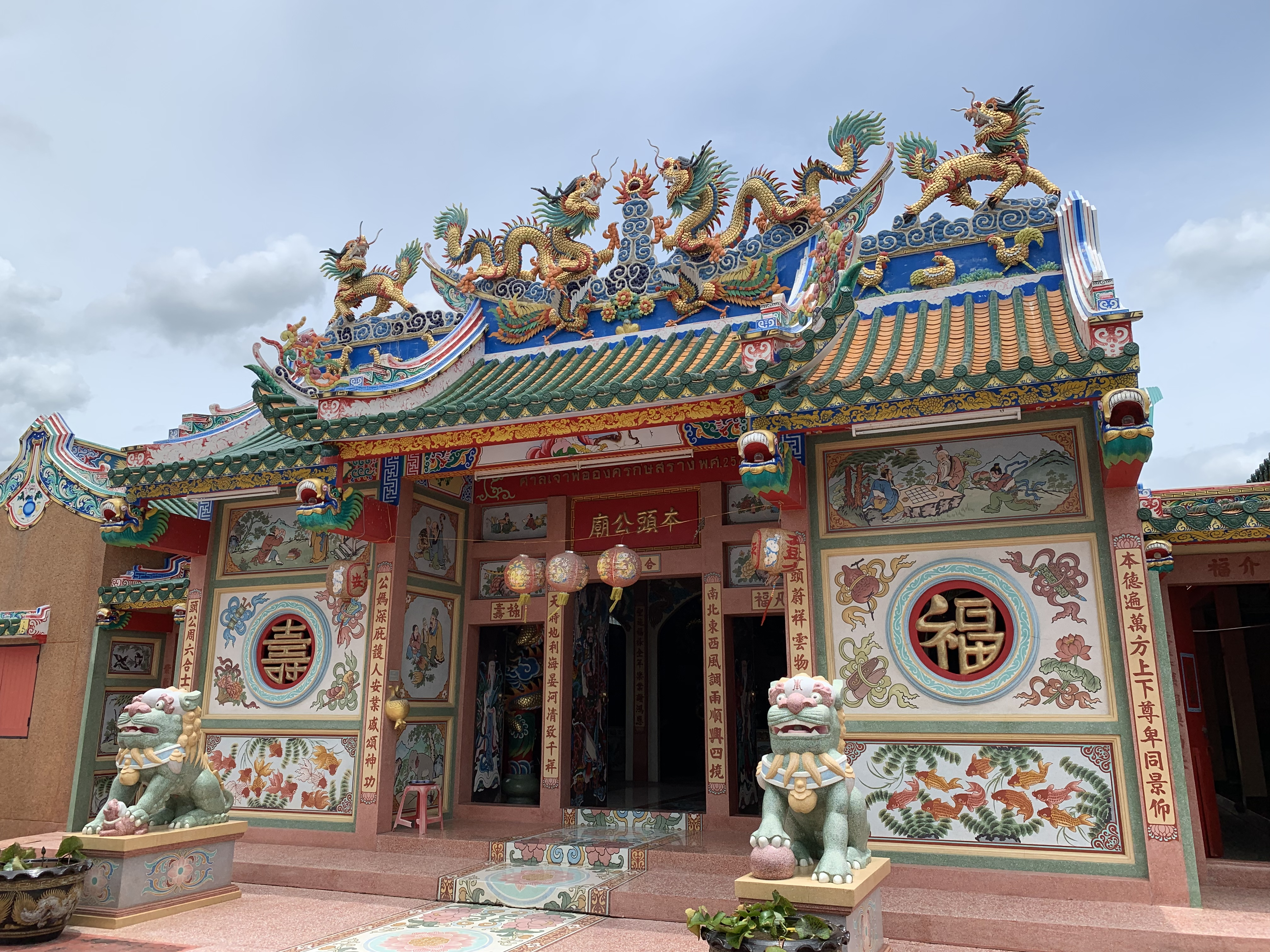
Chao Pho Ongkharak Chinese shrine in Ongkharak

First-generation Chinese immigrants were followers of Mahayana Buddhism, Confucianism and Taoism. Theravada Buddhism has since become the religion of many ethnic Chinese in Thailand, especially among assimilated Chinese. Many Chinese in Thailand commonly combine certain practices of Chinese folk religion with Theravada Buddhism due to the openness and tolerance of Buddhism. Major Chinese festivals such as Chinese New Year, Mid-Autumn Festival and Qingming are widely celebrated, especially in Bangkok, Phuket, and other parts of Thailand where there are large Chinese populations. There are several prominent Buddhist monks with Chinese ancestry like the well-known Buddhist reformer, Buddhadasa Bhikkhu and the former abbot of Wat Saket, Somdet Kiaw.

The Peranakans in Phuket are noted for their nine-day vegetarian festival between September and October. During the festival period, devotees will abstain from meat and the Chinese mediums will perform mortification of the flesh to exhibit the power of the Deities, and the rites and rituals seen are devoted to the veneration of various Deities. Such idiosyncratic traditions were developed during the 19th century in Phuket by the local Chinese with influences from Thai culture.

In the north, there is a small minority of Chinese Muslims known as Chin Ho. They are mainly the descendants of Hui people migrated from Yunnan, China. There are seven Chinese mosques in Chiang Mai. The best known is the Ban Ho Mosque.

In addition, Thai Chinese also have some customs that are different from the mainland China, such as not eating beef, especially among elderly who worship Guanyin, etc.

== Dialect groups ==
Origin cities of Chinese diaspora in Southeast Asia

The vast majority of Thai Chinese belong to various southern Chinese dialect groups. Of these, 56 percent are Teochew (also commonly spelled as Teochiu), 16 percent Hakka and 11 percent Hainanese. The Cantonese and Hokkien each constitute seven percent of the Chinese population and three percent belong to other Chinese dialect groups, as reported in 1994. A large number of Thai Chinese are the descendants of intermarriages between Chinese immigrants and Thais, while there are others who are of predominantly or solely of Chinese descent. People who are of mainly Chinese descent are descendants of immigrants who relocated to Thailand as well as other parts of Nanyang (the Chinese term for Southeast Asia used at the time) in the early to mid-20th century due to famine, poverty and civil war in the southern Chinese provinces of Guangdong (Teochew, Cantonese and Hakka groups), Hainan (Hainanese), Guangxi (Cantonese group) and Fujian (Hokkien, Hockchew and Henghua groups).

=== Teochew ===
Traditionally, the Teochews are a majority population of coastal provinces like Bangkok, Chonburi and Chachoengsao until the 1950s, in which later it was overwhelmed by Central Thai internal immigrants. Many of Thai military commanders as well as politicians come from Teochew backgrounds, while others were involved in trade. During the reign of King Taksin, some influential Teochew traders were granted certain privileges. These prominent traders were called "royal Chinese" (Jin-luang or จีนหลวง in Thai). Prominent Teochew politicians include former prime ministers Phot Phahonyothin, Pridi Banomyong, Thawan Thamrongnawasawat, Kriangsak Chamanan, Chatichai Choonhavan, Suchinda Kraprayoon, Banharn Silpa-archa, Chavalit Yongchaiyudh and Samak Sundaravej

=== Hakka ===
Hakkas are mainly concentrated around Chiang Mai, Nan, Phuket, Chanthaburi as well as some other central western and eastern provinces. The Hakka own many private banks in Thailand, notably Kasikorn Bank and Kiatnakin Bank. Prominent Hakka politicians include former prime ministers Thaksin Shinawatra, Abhisit Vejjajiva, Yingluck Shinawatra, Paetongtarn Shinawatra and Srettha Thavisin, former deputy prime minister Supachai Panitchpakdi and Sudarat Keyuraphan.

=== Hainanese ===
Hainanese people is another prominent Thai Chinese group which are mainly concentrated in Bangkok, Samui and some central provinces. Notable Hainanese Thai families include the Chirathivat family of Central Group and the Yoovidhya family of Krating Daeng, while politicians from this dialect group include former prime minister Pote Sarasin and politicians such as Boonchu Rojanastien, Banyat Bantadtan, Jurin Laksanawisit and Sondhi Limthongkul.

=== Hokkien ===
Hokkiens or Hoklos are a dominant group of Chinese particularly in the south of Thailand, mostly can trace their ancestry from Xiamen; aside from Thais, they also traded with Indians and other foreigners in Thailand. Hokkiens primarily live in Bandon in Surat Thani Province. A smaller Hoklo community can also be found in Hatyai in Songkhla Province and Satun Province. Some Hokkiens live in Bangkok traces their ancestry from Zhangzhou, like Aiyawatt Srivaddhanaprabha. Prominent Hokkien politicians include former prime ministers Chuan Leekpai, Anand Panyarachun and Srettha Thavisin.

=== Cantonese ===
The Cantonese predominantly came from Taishan as well as Xinhui counties in Jiangmen as well as the city of Guangzhou in Guangdong province of China. This group is not very prominent and is mainly concentrated in Bangkok and the central provinces. Although Cantonese people from Yulin primarily live in Betong of Yala Province, they are more popularly known as Kwongsai, in which they are distinguished from fellow people from Guangdong province despite sharing the same native dialect (Thai: กวางไส, 廣西; literally: Western Canton). Thai Chinese politicians with Cantonese ancestry are Plaek Phibunsongkram, Chavarat, and Anutin Charnvirakul.

=== Fuzhou and Fuqing dialects ===
This dialect group is the smallest among the ethnic Chinese populace and are found in places such as Chandi located in Nakhon Si Thammarat province as well as in other provinces such as Chumphon (Lamae and Map Ammarit villages) and also Rayong province (in the settlement of Ban Chandi, which was renamed after their main population centre of Chandi in Southern Thailand as a result of internal immigration and resettlement) as well as a lesser extent a pocket of them being internal migrants residing in Bangkok as well as Central Thailand (surrounding provinces of the capital, Bangkok), they trace their ancestries back to Fuzhou and Ningde towns of northern Fujian province, China.

=== Peranakan ===
Some ethnic Chinese living in the Malay-dominated provinces in the far south use Malay, rather than Thai as a lingua franca, and many have intermarried with local Malays, and are known as Peranakan. They are mostly concentrated in Phuket, Trang and Phang Nga Provinces. In modern sense, Peranakan are not Thai Chinese, because Peranakan speak Southern Thai, while Thai Chinese in Southern Thailand (especially in Hatyai and Bandon) speak a localized accent or variant of Central Thai, known as Laeng kha luang (Thai: แหลงข้าหลวง) which exhibits Southern Thai influences.

== Family names ==
Almost all Thai-Chinese or Sino-Thais, especially those who came to Thailand before the 1950s, only use Thai surname in public, while it was required by Rama VI as a condition of Thai citizenship. The few retaining native Chinese surnames are either recent immigrants or resident aliens. For some immigrants who settled in Southern Thailand before the 1950s, it was common to simply prefix Sae- (from Chinese: 姓, 'family name') to a transliteration of their name to form the new family name; Wanlop Saechio's last name thus derived from the Hainanese 周 and Chanin Sae-ear's last name is from Hokkien 楊. Sae is also used by Hmong people in Thailand. In 1950s-1970s Chinese immigrants had that surname in Thailand, although Chinese immigrants to Thailand after the 1970s use their Chinese family names without Sae-.

Sino-Thai surnames are often distinct from those of the other-Thai population, with generally longer names mimicking those of high officials and upper-class Thais and with elements of these longer names retaining their original Chinese family name in translation or transliteration. For example, former Prime Minister Banharn Silpa-Archa's unusual Archa element is a translation into Thai of his family's former name Ma (trad. 馬, simp. 马, lit. 'horse'). Similarly, the Lim in Sondhi Limthongkul's and Pita Limjaroenrat's name is the pronunciation of the name Lin (林). For an example, see the background of the Vejjajiva Palace name. Note that the latter-day Royal Thai General System of Transcription would transcribe it as Wetchachiwa and that the Sanskrit-derived name refers to 'medical profession'.

== Notable figures ==
=== Royalty ===
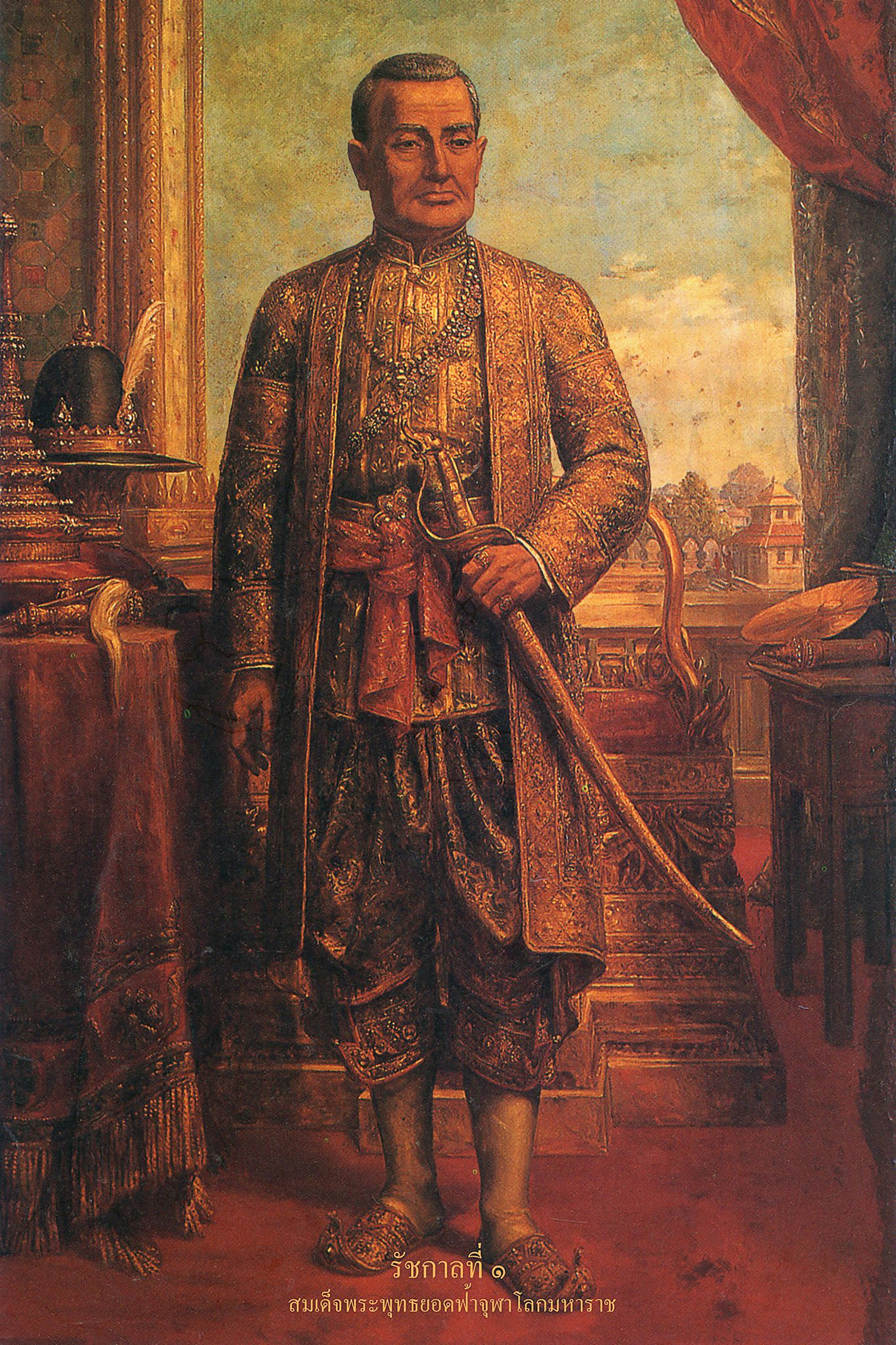
King Rama I

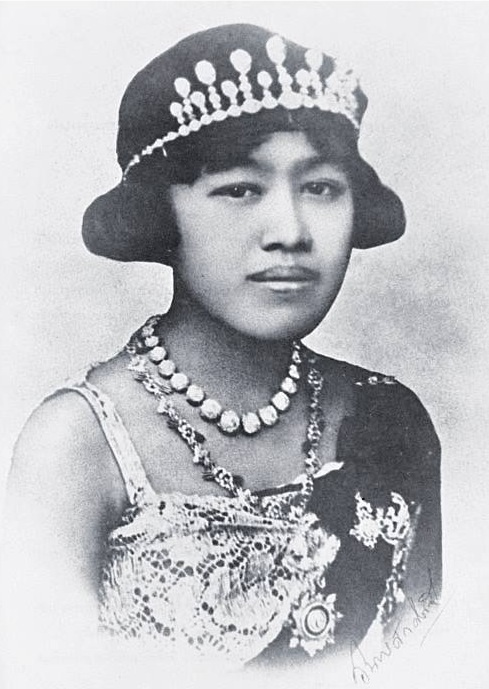
Princess Consort Indrasakdi Sachi

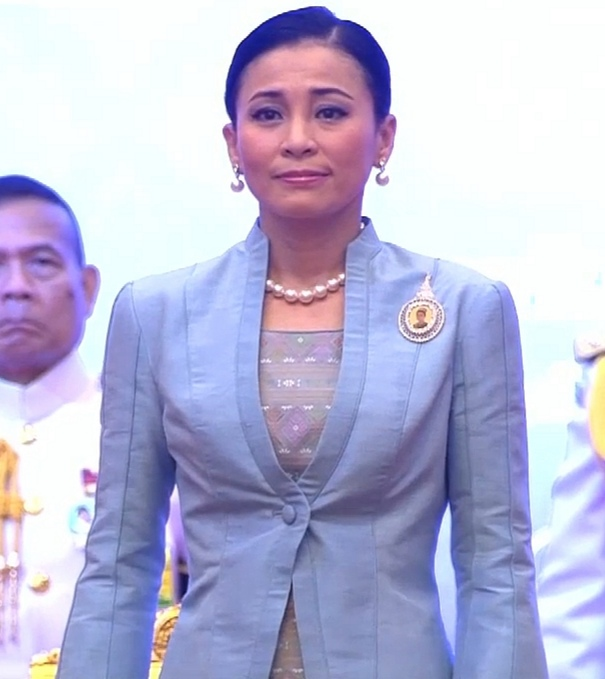
Queen Suthida

- King Taksin of Thonburi, son of a Teochew Chinese father migrant gambler or trader and a Thai mother
- King Rama I, son of "a beautiful daughter of a mix of Chinese and Thai family in Ayutthaya"
- Indrasakdi Sachi, Princess consort of Siam
- Queen Suthida, Queen consort of Thailand

=== Prime Ministers ===
Kon Hutasingha

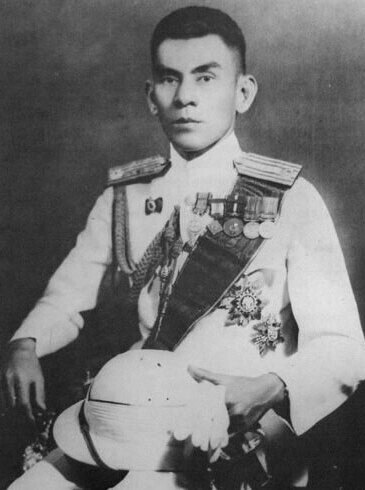
Thawan Thamrongnawasawat

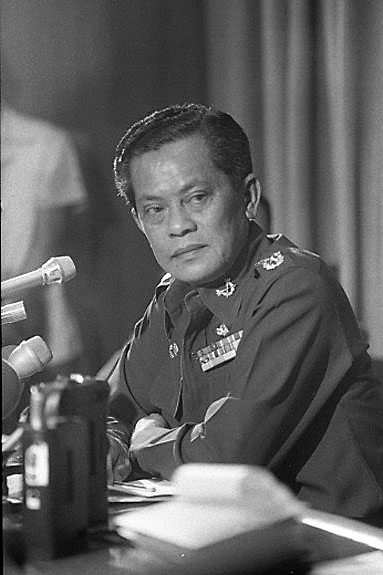
Kriangsak Chamanan

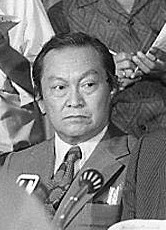
Chatichai Choonhavan

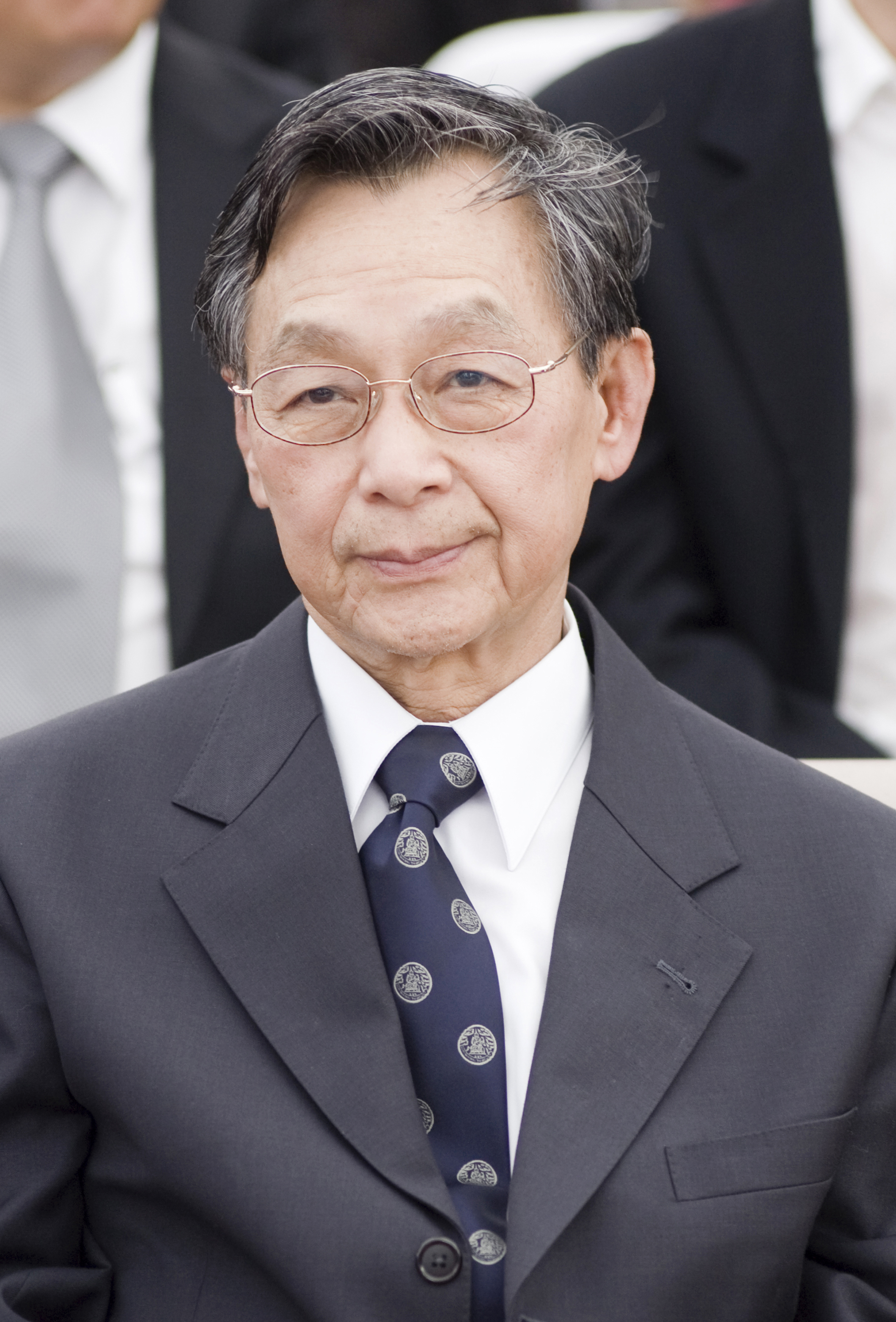
Chuan Leekpai

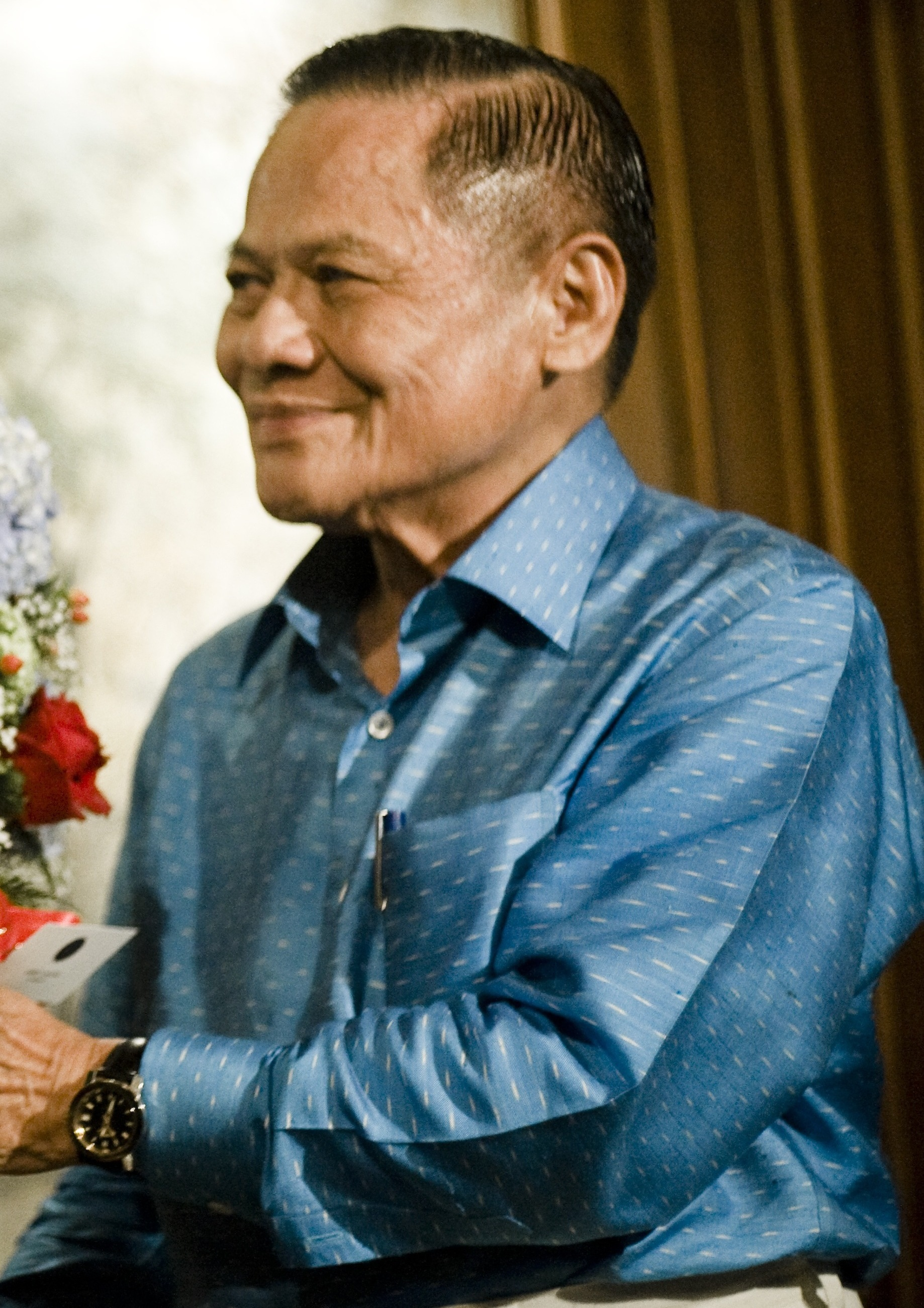
Banharn Silpa-archa

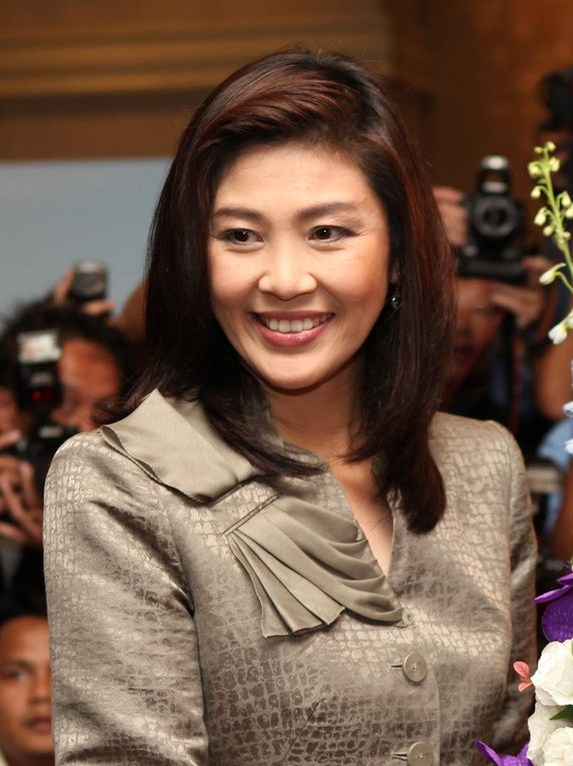
Yingluck Shinawatra

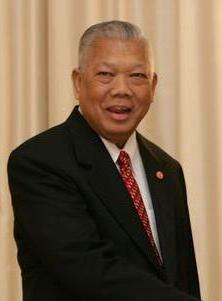
Samak Sundaravej

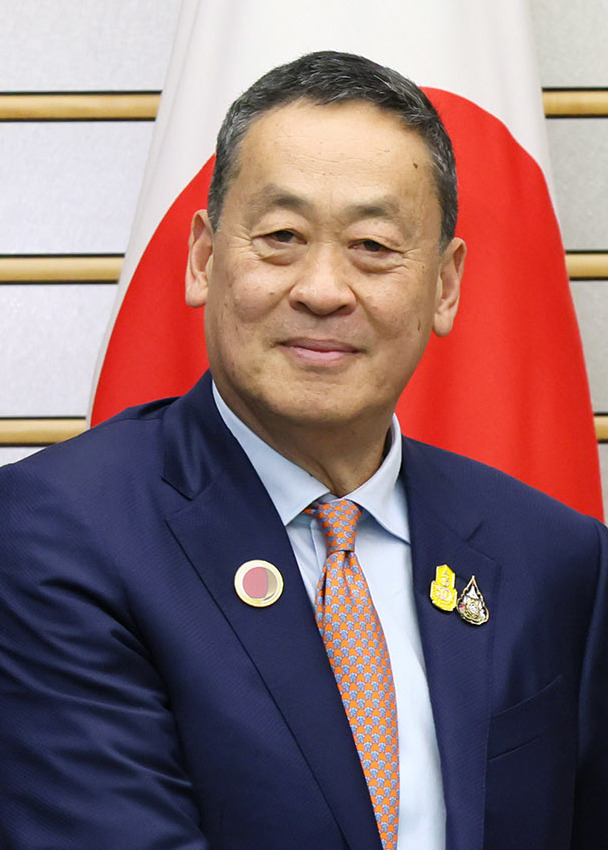
Srettha Thavisin

Thai Chinese Prime Ministers:

==== 20th century ====
- Kon Hutasingha
- Phot Phahonyothin
- Plaek Phibunsongkhram
- Seni Pramoj
- Pridi Banomyong
- Thawan Thamrongnawasawat
- Pote Sarasin
- Thanom Kittikachorn
- Sarit Thanarat
- Kukrit Pramoj
- Thanin Kraivichien
- Kriangsak Chamanan
- Chatichai Choonhavan
- Anand Panyarachun
- Suchinda Kraprayoon
- Chuan Leekpai
- Banharn Silpa-archa
- Chavalit Yongchaiyudh

==== 21st century ====
- Thaksin Shinawatra
- Samak Sundaravej,
- Abhisit Vejjajiva
- Yingluck Shinawatra
- Srettha Thavisin
- Paetongtarn Shinawatra
- Anutin Charnvirakul (incumbent)

=== Cabinet and governors ===
- Boonchu Rojanastien, Banker, Deputy Prime Minister, Finance Minister.
- Chitchai Wannasathit, Minister of Justice, Acting Prime Minister.
- Pao Sarasin, Deputy Prime Minister and Minister of Interior.
- Jurin Laksanawisit, Deputy Prime Minister and Minister of Health
- Chavarat Charnvirakul, Acting Prime Minister of Thailand, Deputy Prime Minister, Minister of Social Development and Human Security and Minister of Interior.
- Bhichai Rattakul, World President of Rotary International, Deputy Prime Minister, Speaker of the National Assembly, Minister of Foreign Affairs.
- Kalaya Sophonpanich, Minister of Science and Technology.
- Bhichit Rattakul, Governor of Bangkok and Businessman.
- Kanchana Silpa-archa, Deputy Minister of Education.
- Apirak Kosayodhin, Governor of Bangkok, CEO of True Corporation.
- Varawut Silpa-archa, Minister of Social Development and Human Security and Minister of Natural Resources and Environment.
- Supachai Panitchpakdi, Deputy Prime Minister and the first and only Asian Director-General of the World Trade Organization
- Wichit Wichitwathakan, Minister of Finance, Economic Affairs and Foreign Affairs, historian and political novelist.

=== Business and entrepreneur ===
- Zheng Yifeng, famously known as Yi Kor Hong or Er Ge Feng, a businessman and philanthropist in 19th century.
- Chin Sophonpanich, Banker that founded the Bangkok Bank and Bangkok Insurance.
- Thaworn Phornprapha, Entrepreneur and founder of Siam Motors Group.
- Chaleo Yoovidhya, Billionaire inventor of Red Bull.
- Vanich Chaiyawan, Billionaire and chairman of Thai Life Insurance, the second-largest life insurer in Thailand.
- Prasert Prasarttong-Osoth, founder and owner of Bangkok Dusit Medical Services, Thailand's largest private health care group, and the owner of Bangkok Airways.
- Dhanin Chearavanont, Billionaire and the senior chairman of CP Group.
- Charoen Sirivadhanabhakdi, Billionaire business magnate and investor.
- Krit Ratanarak, Billionaire chairman of Bangkok Broadcasting & Television Company.
- Chalerm Yoovidhya, Billionaire Businessman and heir to the Red Bull fortune.
- Vichai Srivaddhanaprabha, Billionaire founder, owner and chairman of King Power.
- Chartsiri Sophonpanich, Billionaire President of Bangkok Bank.
- Panthongtae Shinawatra, founding Billionaire of Voice TV.
- Aiyawatt Srivaddhanaprabha, youngest Billionaire of Asia.

=== Others ===
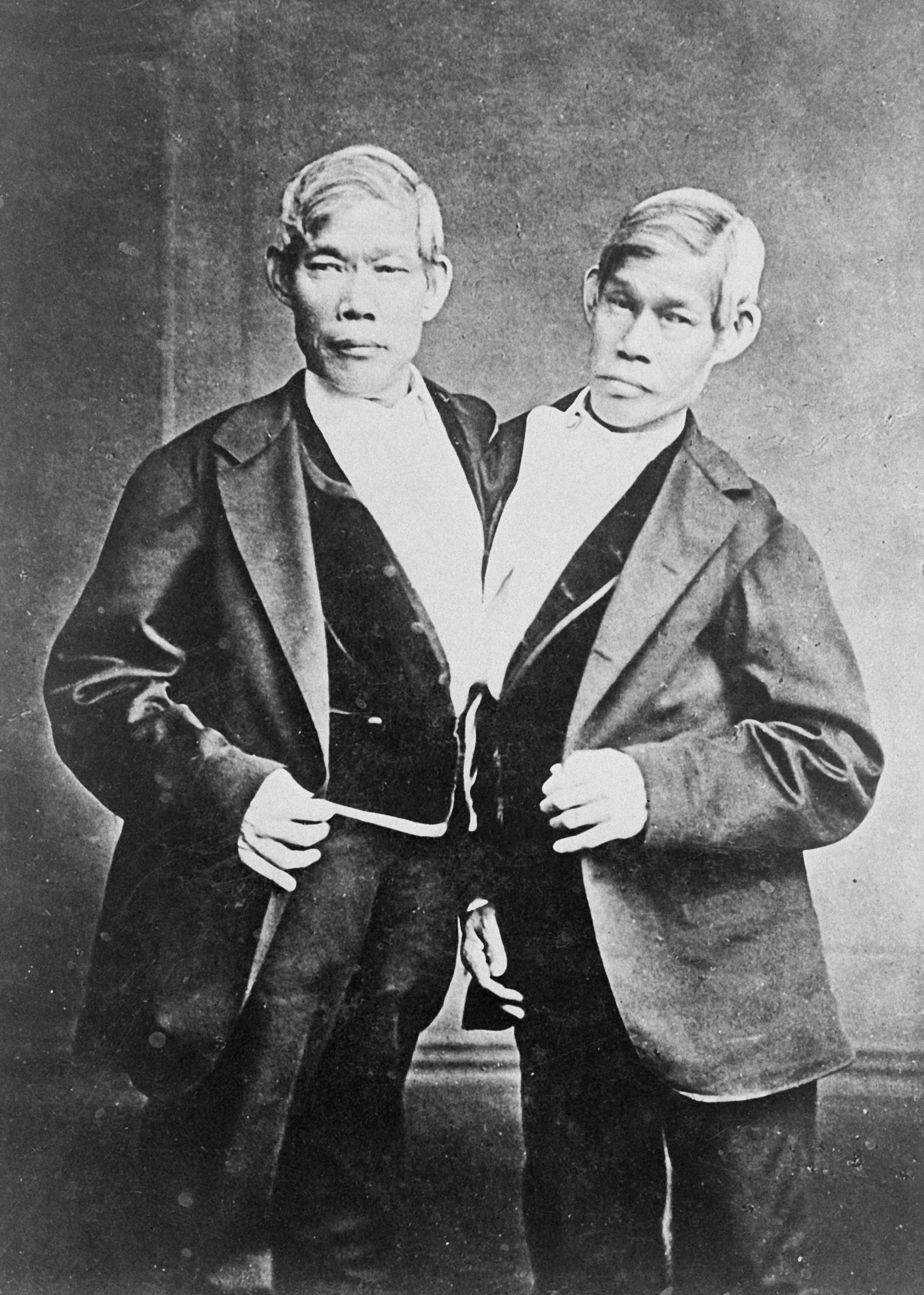
Chang and Eng Bunker

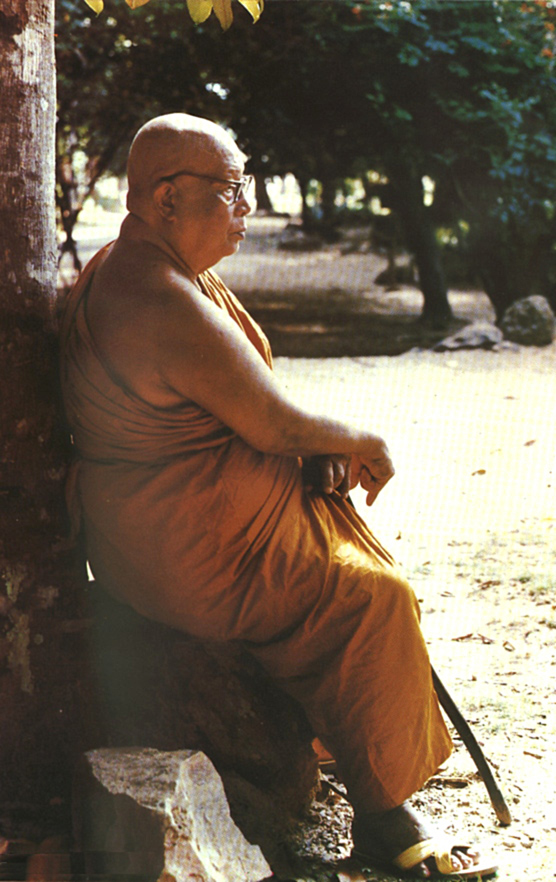
Buddhadasa Bhikkhu

- Buddhadasa Bhikkhu, famous and influential Buddhist reformist monk.
- Somdet Heng Khemachari, Chief Monk of the Southern Region.
- Luang Pu Thong Ayana, highly revered and one of the longest-lived Thai monks.
- Maha Kanachan Yen Tek, former Chief Monk of the Chinese Sangha of Thailand
- Pita Limjaroenrat, politician, and businessman. He served as the leader of the Move Forward Party.
- Atthaya Thitikul, professional golfer
- Chang and Eng Bunker, famous conjoined twins.
- Bundit Ungrangsee, symphonic conductor.
- Michael Michai Kitbunchu, cardinal and Archbishop of Bangkok from 1973 to 2009.
- Apichatpong Weerasethakul, award-winning film director.
- Jet Tila, chef and restauraunteur.
- Piyabutr Saengkanokkul, academic and politician. He served as a member of the Thai House of Representatives.
- Parit Wacharasindhu, politician and television host.
- Joey Boy, hip hop singer and producer.
- Puttichai Kasetsin, actor, DJ, television host.
- Tanutchai Wijitwongthong, actor.
- Chalida Vijitvongthong, actress.
- Utt Panichkul, actor, host, television presenter.
- Francis Xavier Kriengsak Kovitvanit, cardinal and Archbishop of Bangkok since 2009.
- Nichkhun, singer and rapper.
- James Ma, actor and model.
- Vachirawit Chivaaree, actor and singer.
- Metawin Opas-iamkajorn, actor.
- Yuenyong Opakul, singer, musician, record producer.
- Ten, singer and dancer.
- BamBam, Boy Band rapper, record producer.
- Nattawat Jirochtikul, actor and singer.
- Minnie, singer and actress.
- Sophida Kanchanarin, model, beauty queen, Miss Universe Thailand 2018.
- Tontawan Tantivejakul, actress and model.
- Thasorn Klinnium, actress and singer.
- Sondhi Limthongkul, writer, media proprietor and political activist.
- Chaithawat Tulathon, politician. He served as the leader of the Move Forward Party.
- Natthaphong Ruengpanyawut, politician and businessman. He serve as the leader of the People's Party.

== See also ==
- Chao Mae Thapthim Shrine (水尾聖娘廟)
- China–Thailand relations
- Chinese folk religion in Southeast Asia
- Chow Yam-nam (White Dragon King)
- Gong Wu Shrine
- Kian Un Keng Shrine (建安宮)
- Leng Buai Ia Shrine (龍尾古廟)
- Lim Ko Niao (林姑娘)
- Poh Teck Tung Foundation
- Racism in Thailand
- San Chaopho Suea (Sao Chingcha) (打惱路玄天上帝廟)
- Thian Fah Foundation Hospital (天華醫院)
- Wat Bamphen Chin Phrot (永福寺)
- Wat Mangkon Kamalawat (龍蓮寺)
- Wat San Chao Chet (七聖媽廟)
