= Sohan Lal Commodity Management =

Agri Logistics Service Provider

- Company type: Limited
- Industry: Agriculture, Warehouse
- Founded: 2009
- Founder: Sandeep Sabharwal
- Headquarters: Delhi, (Head office), India
- Area served: India & Myanmar
- Website: www.sohanlal.in

Sohan Lal Commodity Management is an Indian Post-harvest Agri Logistics Service Provider, with its offices in India and Myanmar. It provides Commodity, Warehousing, Procurement and Collateral Management of Agri-Commodities and end-to-end agricultural services to the Indian farmers and allied stakeholders.

== History ==
In 1995, Sandeep Sabharwal, an MBA graduate from the Fore School of Management in Delhi, joined Sohan Lal. In 2004, Sabharwal initiated his business by renting a warehouse in Lawrence Road, Delhi, and commenced the practice of providing farmers with bar-coded warehouse receipt. The reliability of this system is such that banks now consider a bar-coded receipt from Sohan Lal as a guarantee when farmers seek financial assistance. Sohan Lal Commodity Management has been contracted by companies such as Cargill, a US-based agricultural powerhouse, for the storage of agricultural commodities.

In March 2017, ResponsAbility Investments AG (Switzerland) and Incofin Investment Management (Belgium) invested $20 million in Sohan Lal Commodity Management (SLCM).

In December 2017, SLCM collaborated with State Bank of India, HDFC Bank, and IndusInd Bank for collateral management.

In November 2024, SLCM partnered with Bank of Baroda for Agri financing.

== Operations ==
The logistics division of Sohan Lal Commodity Management is involved in storage, fumigation, quality assessment, agricultural appraisal, and risk management. SLCM has a network of approximately 16,646 warehouses with an area of – 303.64 million square feet handling a daily asset under management of 10,928.82 crores. SLCM has 4500+ employees in India.

SLCM has successfully entered the Myanmar market, establishing itself as the only Indian company in the agricultural logistics industry with operations abroad. SLCM oversees a network of 316 industrial zones covering an area of 9.22 million square feet. It manages a total of 1443 commodities, including both agricultural and non-agricultural products, with a throughput of 11.88 million metric tones.

The financial wing of SLCM is a RBI regulated NBFC called Kissandhan, and it encompasses various products and services such as Commodity Based Finance (CBF), Business Correspondent Partnerships, Kissandhan, and Invoice Discounting Facility.

== Awards ==
- FICCI Awards 2022 by Ministry of Agriculture and Farmers' Welfare
