= Chachchon Ratanarak =

Thai businessman

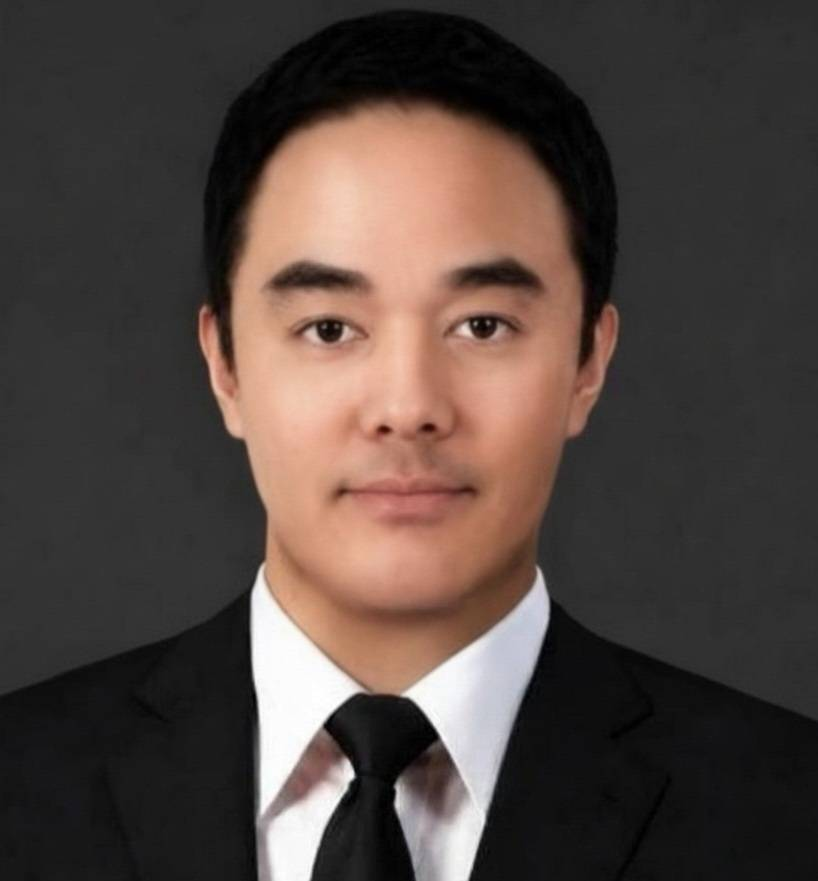
- Born: June 18, 1972 (age 54); Bangkok, Thailand
- Occupation: Businessman
- Children: 1
- Parent(s): Krit Ratanarak; Chaiskran Hiranpruk PhD

Chachchon Ratanarak (Thai: ชัชชน รัตนรักษ์; RTGS: Chatchon Rattanarak) is a Thai businessman belonging to the third generation of the Ratanarak family.

The Ratanaraks are one of the 'old money' families in Thailand and have substantial holdings in a number of Thai-based companies including Bank of Ayudhya (branded and commonly referred to as Krungsri Bank), Siam City Cement, Allianz Ayudhya Capital, Matching Maximize Studio, Media Studio, Grand Canal Land and Eastern Star Real Estate as well as holding a majority stake in Bangkok Broadcasting & Television Company (BBTV), which operates Thailand's Channel 7. The group also owns HR Pro Security and Services, one of the largest security firm in Thailand.

== Early life ==
Born in 1972, Chachchon is the only child of Krit Ratanarak, chairman of BBTV and head of the Ratanarak Group, and Associate Professor Chaiskran Hiranpruk, PhD. He is the grandson of Chuan Ratanarak, who founded Bank of Ayudhya (known today as Krungsri Bank), Siam City Cement (producer of the Insee Cement brand) and BBTV and was one of Thailand’s last great self-made business Titans.

Chachchon, also known as Ton or Tone, was educated in Thailand until he was 10. He continued his primary and secondary education in England, earning a degree in Economics from University of London in 1996.

== Professional life ==
After leaving university, Chachchon declined an offer to join Goldman Sachs and instead chose to work for the family. According to a Thai biographer: "The Ratanarak's empire remains a giant with a bright future, with Chachchon Ratanarak the third generation leader in line to continue and to extend this solid family business's tradition of prosperity."

Chachchon was invited to serve as a judge for the Bangkok Business Challenge, Asia's longest-running global student startup competition, hosted by Sasin School of Management since 2002. The competition features judges who are leading entrepreneurs and investors from the region, and Chachchon was the youngest judge on the panel.

The Ratanaraks are known to be very private; Forbes call them “a very secretive clan”, and Chachchon has been described as “influential while staying below the radar”. Despite their ownership in a variety of publicly listed companies, the Ratanaraks value privacy over publicity and rarely make an appearance. Even in the digital age when information is widely available, an Internet search on Chachchon would reveal very little information, all of which is in a professional capacity. He never appears in the society section of any media.

Chachchon has been a director of Siam City Cement from 2006 to 2019, during which the company shifted from being a leading domestic player to a regional player by expanding into fast-growing markets of Bangladesh, Cambodia, Sri Lanka and Vietnam.

Building on their existing substantial holdings, in August 2024, the Ratanarak Group strengthened its long-standing control over Siam City Cement by acquiring Jardine Cycle & Carriage Ltd.'s 25.24% shareholding for US$353.97 million. This move solidified the Ratanarak family's status as the founder and primary shareholders. After a subsequent tender offer to minority shareholders, the Group's total ownership of Siam City Cement (a company with combined assets of ฿82 billion, or US$2.5 billion) increased to approximately 79%. Additionally, the Ratanarak family holds an interest of approximately 20% in Krungsri Bank, which has combined assets of ฿2.62 trillion (US$80.4 billion).

Growing the family's existing businesses, Chachchon founded an asset management company Primavest in 2001 which at its height in 2007 had US$900 million in assets under management. Primavest was sold to Ayudhya Fund Management (now Krungsri Asset Management) of Bank of Ayudhya in 2009. He founded Tonson Group in 2006 and Tonson Property in 2007 to conduct investment and property development businesses in Thailand and overseas.

According to Forbes, the Ratanarak family’s holdings in the group businesses in 2014 were estimated to be worth US$5.1 billion, based on publicly known assets and excludes private assets and property. In 2012, the Thai publication ‘Which Family is Richest’ reported the Ratanarak family as having holdings in excess of US$10 billion since 1998 when other assets are included.
