= HKL =

HKL may refer to:

- Handball Korea League
- Hattha Kaksekar, a Cambodian microfinance organization
- Helsinki City Transport
- Hongkong Land, a land developer in Hong Kong
- Kuala Lumpur Hospital (Malay: Hospital Besar Kuala Lumpur)
- Miller index (hkℓ), describing crystal lattice planes
