= Tonson Group =

Thai investment company

Tonson Group is a diversified investment company based in Bangkok, Thailand.

== History ==
Tonson Group was founded in 2006 by Chachchon Ratanarak. The Ratanarak family have substantial holdings in a number of Thai-based companies including Bank of Ayudhya, Siam City Cement, Allianz Ayudhya Capital, Matching Maximize Studio, Medial Studio, Grand Canal Land and Eastern Star Real Estate as well as holding a majority stake in Bangkok Broadcasting & Television Company (BBTV), which operates Thailand's Channel 7.

Tonson Group has diversified investments in Thailand and internationally. Areas of particular focus include property and construction, leisure, media, new media and technology. Tonson Group has a team of senior analysts supporting its investment strategy and operating in an advisory capacity within the Ratanarak Group.

Tonson Group’s office is in Tonson Tower, a prime office building in Ploenchit, Bangkok which, along with neighbouring Ploenchit Tower, is owned by the Ratanarak Group.

Tonson Property, a subsidiary of Tonson Group, is one of the three property development companies in the Ratanarak Group. Tonson Group is developing Tonson Property as a luxury and ultra-prime property brand specialising in contemporary minimalist architecture and design.

== Involvement with Rama III District ==
Chachchon’s father Krit Ratanarak is reported to be taking a lead in the development of Bangkok’s Rama III Riverside district in the central south west of the city. The Rama III area was referred to as the Wall Street of Bangkok before the 1996 financial crisis. Today it is again regarded as an up-and-coming district of central Bangkok amid long-term moves to redevelop the area in the same fashion as London’s Canary Wharf. In 2010, the Rama III area saw the second highest increase in condominium prices in central Bangkok after the central business district.

The Rama III area has ample undeveloped land in large parcels that runs along the river and some of the city’s best transport infrastructure, including the Bhumibol Bridge named after Thailand’s king who inaugurated the new bridge in 2010. Rama III has been identified by the Bangkok Metropolitan Administration as part of a zone to be developed as a model of environmentally friendly mass transit system. The Rama III riverside area was unaffected by the severe flooding that submerged many areas of Bangkok in November 2011.

Tonson Group’s first development in Rama III is an ultra-prime condominium project called The Sathu Residences.

== See also ==
- Chachchon Ratanarak
- Krit Ratanarak
