= Chuan Ratanarak =

Thai businessman (1920–1993)

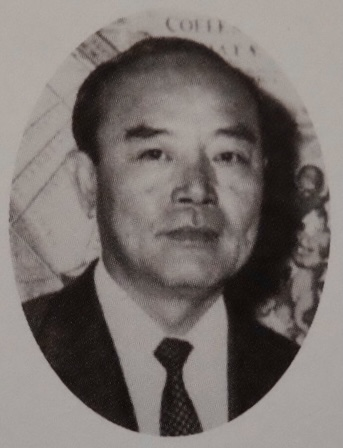
- Born: November 2, 1920; Shantou, China
- Died: August, 1993 (aged 72–73)
- Occupation: Businessman
- Spouse: Sasithorn Ratanarak
- Children: 6

Chuan Ratanarak (Chinese: 李木川; pinyin: Lǐ Mùchuān; Thai: ชวน รัตนรักษ์; 1920–1993) was a self-made Thai businessman who built one of the largest and most powerful business empires in Thailand. Starting with nothing, Chuan was one of the legendary generation of Chinese merchants in Thailand to achieve success in one generation. By the time of his death in August 1993, age 73, Chuan was at the head of one of the three dominant business families in Thailand - the others being the Sophonpanich family and the Lamsam family - and the business group Chuan had created, the Ratanarak Group, included Thailand's most successful terrestrial broadcaster, a major retail banking and insurance group and the country's second largest cement producer. Comparing Thai and US entrepreneurs, Professor Krishnamra, Director of the Sasin Business School at Thailand's Chulalongkorn University, has said “given the size of the market and the stage of development, Chuan as an entrepreneur was comparable to the Vanderbilts or Rockefellers”. Chuan is the father of Krit Ratanarak and the grandfather of Chachchon Ratanarak.

== Personal life and legacy ==
Chuan married Sasithorn in the 1940s and they had 6 children; one son, Krit, and 5 daughters. He also took Krit's son, Chachchon, under his wing.

In the early years, Chuan worked from a modest office in the Chinatown branch of Bank of Ayudhya on Yaowarat Road and although he would move to larger modern offices as the business grew, he would remain a very private and family-oriented individual who, unlike many other prominent overseas Chinese businessmen, would seldom be seen at social functions or events. Chuan was extremely hard working, often to be found at his desk at home working late into the night studying company documents or checking accounts on his abacus.

A gifted businessman, Chuan was a highly respected and admired figure in Thailand's business community with a reputation for diligence and assiduous attention to detail and was well known among Thailand's Teochew community. Chuan was also known for his generosity and philanthropy, particularly where he saw the long term benefits for Thailand. Among other projects, he set up an education foundation and financial support from Chuan was critical to the establishment of Sasin Business School and its later development. He was loyal to those who remained loyal to him. The staff in the group businesses were reported to be ‘very fond’ of him and ‘would work their hearts out’ for him, and many of his associates and colleagues became wealthy in their own right as the Ratanarak Group flourished.

In an interview in 2013, Professor Krishnamra, the Director of Sasin Business School at Chulalongkorn University said of Chuan: “He had many good friends and he helped his friends to the end. That is why he had many business colleagues. He had above all a warm personality. I also remember that he was very quick-witted. He was sincere and a man of his words - whenever he said 'yes', he always meant it. He had good friends and firm friends. Nowadays there is no-one like Khun Chuan. His warmth would bound over every obstacle”.

In business, Chuan combined a powerful intellect with imagination and ambition and would perceive and pursue long-term opportunities that would frequently defy conventional wisdom. Chuan left behind a considerable legacy beyond the business empire. During his working life he was responsible for considerable sums of investment made by Chinese businesses into the Thai economy financed by loans from the Ratanarak Group. In the 40 years from 1945, investment by Thailand's Chinese community far exceeded inward investment from overseas in both volume and in its impact on Thailand's development, and Chuan played a major part in developing Thailand's trajectory and economic modernisation, particularly in the period from 1960 to 1985 before overseas investment became more significant for Thailand's economic growth.

Chuan is recognised as one of the last great self-made Thai business Titans. Although he achieved a position of considerable wealth and power, he remained modest, engaging and always true to his principles. When news of his death broke in 1993, the newspapers were filled with personal messages of condolence and tributes to his achievements and character placed personally by many of the leading figures in Thailand's business and political community in recognition of the position of respect Chuan had achieved within Thai society.

== Early years ==
Chuan Ratanarak was born in Shantou, China in 1920 as Lee Bak Chuan and came with his family to live in Thailand when he was age 6. In the 1940s, as a young man, he worked as a labourer at the Ratchawong pier in Bangkok's docks. He saved his wages until he was able to buy his own ship and in a short period he established two of the most successful waterway transport companies of the time; Bangkok Transport and Bangkok Lighter.

Throughout the 1940s and 1950s Thailand's Chinese community played a key role in business and commerce. Because of discriminatory anti-Chinese legislation in place from 1939 to 1957 under the pre and post-war premierships of Field Marshal Plaek Phibunsongkhram, and the uncertain political and business environment in post-war Thailand, it became necessary for Chinese business families to develop close business relationships with each other and with dominant military groups and powerful Thai families. In the early 1950s, Chuan built particularly close relationships with among others the family of Field Marshal Praphas Charusathien and Field Marshal Thanom Kittikachorn, who would serve as Prime Minister between 1963 and 1971 and again between 1972 and 1973.

== Building the Ratanarak Group ==
=== Shipping ===
In 1954, Chuan founded the United River Transport Co Ltd with the support of Field Marshal Praphas Charusathien merging his existing shipping businesses - Bangkok Transport and Bangkok Lighter - into the new company. In 1964 Chuan co-founded General Logistics Company, the largest shipping company at that time, with Field Marshal Praphas. Chuan later sold his shares in the business.

=== Krungsri Bank ===
Following the 1957 coup by Field Marshal Sarit Thanarat, Thailand underwent economic reform under the guidance of US economists, the World Bank and the IMF which accompany an expansion of US economic aid to Thailand. The new, more open economic policy brought new opportunities for the Chinese business community - particularly the banking groups who took the lion's share of the new opportunities - and reduced their reliance on the military for protection. In 1958, Chuan was encouraged by the incoming government to invest in Bank of Ayudhya, known today as Krungsri Bank, which had seen its performance decline following the death of the bank's then leading shareholder and manager. With his background in commerce, Chuan brought a fresh wind of change to the bank, first by solving the liquidity issue and then by shifting from the civil service mentality that was rampant in the bank to a customer centricity. As a result, Chuan quickly rose through the ranks. By the end of 1961, Chuan had acquired a controlling stake and assumed ownership of the bank. Chuan served as the senior executive of the Bank from 1961 until 1993.

The Stock Exchange of Thailand opened in 1962 but the emerging banking system remained the main source of capital. The families that now controlled the largest banks succeeded in using their access to capital to build diversified conglomerate business groups with the number of companies controlled by the four largest banking families increasing five-fold between 1958 and 1973 so that by 1979 more than half of the families’ companies were involved in non-banking activities. Through their political connections and growing economic power, the largest banks also provided a degree of protection for Thai companies to whom they extended loans allowing emerging local businesses to grow rapidly in a difficult business environment, particularly during the period of the US guided reforms in the 1960s and 1970s and building the powerbase and wealth of their supporting banking groups in the process. Strategic lending by Chuan via Bank of Ayudhya was critical to the development of the Thai economy during Thailand's early industrialisation and helped to build many of modern Thailand's major business groups.

Under Chuan, Bank of Ayudhya became one of Thailand's top three banks. Its success was in very large part due to Chuan's leadership. Comparing Chin Sophonpanich, the head of Bangkok Bank to Chuan, the Director of Sasin Business School commented: “What Khun Chin could do, Khun Chuan could do later. That is how he built Bank of Ayudhya”. The bank also benefitted from an astute lending policy which meant that the average number of bad loans was significantly below the average loan loss across the Thai banking sector.

In 1996, before the Asian financial crisis was to hit Thailand the following year, shares in the bank were trading at just under THB 150, giving the bank a market value of US$4 billion in 2013 prices.

=== Siam City Bank ===
In 1963, Chuan acquired a stake in Siam City Bank which increased to 25% during further rounds of capital raising, making Chuan the bank's major shareholder. Chuan divested his shares in Siam City Bank during the 1980s.

=== Siam City Cement ===
In 1967, Chuan was granted the first licence in Thailand to operate a privately owned cement factory and mining operation; Thailand's only cement producer at the time was Siam Cement Company, owned - as it is today - by the Crown Property Bureau. Chuan founded Siam City Cement, producer of the Insee Cement brand, in 1969 and served as Chairman of Siam City Cement from its foundation until 1993.

From its inception, Siam City Cement grew steadily, beginning production in 1972 and listing on the stock exchange only five years later. During the 1980s, the company was the first to use local lignite in place of fuel oils and to deploy a heat-energy recycling system. Production grew steadily during the 1980s and 1990s and production capacity exceeded 12 million tons in 1996. Today, Siam City Cement is still Thailand's second largest cement producer with a market share of around 27% and has expanded to become a leading construction materials group.

=== Channel 7 – BBTV ===
In 1967, Chuan was granted a licence to operate Channel 7 terrestrial television, in association with the sister-in-law of Field Marshal Praphas, using spectrum and a transmission network owned by the Royal Thai Army. Bangkok Broadcasting & Television (BBTV) was set up to operate Channel 7, with financing provided by Chuan through the Ratanarak Group and in turn Chuan acquired a substantial majority of the shares.

While banking remained the core of the group's business, BBTV, was to become an increasingly dominant force in Thai broadcasting and a source of significant revenue for the Ratanarak Group. By the early 1990s, BBTV's Channel 7 had become both the most popular and the most commercially successful station with more than 50% of the total audience share and over 30% of total TV advertising revenue; a position the channel retains to the present day.

Chuan was instrumental in the success of BBTV providing extensive funding to invest in the broadcasting infrastructure. This move has been described as visionary in two senses: under the terms of the licensing agreement for the operation of the channel from the Royal Thai Army, the channel would operate independently but the broadcast infrastructure would remain the property of the Army. Chuan funded the development of a modern nationwide communications infrastructure, meeting a national security need and winning military approval. The investment was also visionary because Chuan foresaw the development of mass advertising and the importance of long term capital investment in high quality nationwide coverage to win audience share.

In 1973, Channel 7 pioneered the installation relay stations network in the provinces and in 1978 was the first to broadcast by satellite signal from Bangkok to its relay station network. As a result, Channel 7 gained an important first mover advantage building a loyal audience base across the country and a strong brand. Today, Channel 7 has 35 relay stations and its broadcast coverage extends to the entire territory of Thailand and to border regions of neighboring countries. Channel 7 was the first TV station in South East Asia to broadcast in color and is still the only TV station able to reach 100% of the Thai population.

=== Property and real estate ===
From the early 1960s, Chuan began to develop an extensive portfolio of investments in land and real estate. He invested in various property businesses and built a substantial land bank which included several hundred acres of premium development land in central Bangkok and significantly larger holdings in the rural provinces. Chuan also acquired substantial land holdings in Bangkok's Yannawa district which lies to the south of the Sathorn business district, recognizing that Bangkok's long-term development would lead to expansion of the business district into this area. In 1990, Chuan started construction of Ploenchit Tower on Ploenchit Road in central Bangkok with construction completed in 1993. In 1991, construction started on an office tower that would be the new headquarters for Bank of Ayudhya on riverfront land on the Rama III road in the Yannawa district. Construction was completed in 1996.

=== Hong Kong ===
Chuan maintained close ties to the Teochew Chinese community in Hong Kong and between 1950 and 1980 built up a variety of investments and business interests in Hong Kong. At one time these included an interest in the Bank of Canton and in numerous real estate and property investment projects.

=== Other businesses ===
Among other businesses Chuan at various times owned are Siam Flour Mills, later sold to Metro Group, and investments in sugar and warehousing businesses.

=== Asian financial crisis and its aftermath ===
By the 1980s, the Thai banking groups, while not the only powerful section of private capital in Thailand, had become the section that was obviously dominant. Around 30 families dominated this period and the banking groups towered above them all. The man who started working life as a docker, now headed one of the three most powerful banking families in Thailand.

The Ratanarak Group controlled enterprises in industry, commerce and finance with Bank of Ayudhya at the core of the group. By 1993 when he died, Chuan led a powerful diversified business group. Its growth had been financed largely by retained earnings with most of the group companies having little or no financial liabilities . Chuan's conservative approach to business and banking reflected his command of financial details across all the businesses and meant that the Ratanarak Group had a strong financial foundation when in 1997 Thailand was hit by the Asian financial crisis.

The robust financial position of the Ratanarak Group companies at the time Chuan passed in 1993 meant that the family group, now under the control of Chuan's son and heir Krit, was one of very few to prosper despite the crisis. The group emerged from the crisis with the Ratanaraks retaining their position in the top five business families in Thailand, and one of three of Thailand's most powerful business families along with the Sophonpanich and Lamsam families.

While other banks closed or were nationalized, the Ratanarak family successfully completed a recapitalisation of Bank of Ayudhya without losing control and the bank continued to improve its performance in the post-crisis aftermath. In 1996 before the crisis the bank had market capitalisation of US$4 billion and this had risen to US$7 billion in 2014. The family shareholding in the bank was reduced in 2007 from 35% to 25% to comply with a reduction in the maximum permitted holding under new banking regulations which came into force in 2008. he reduction in ownership was not achieved by a sale of family's holdings; rather, it was executed as a strategic investment by GE Capital that increased the bank's registered share capital and strengthened its consumer lending business with world-class standards. The family previously brought in GE Capital in 2007 to enhance banking operations and install best practice. In 2013, GE Capital held just under 25% of the bank's equity and were part-way through a process to sell their remaining holding following losses incurred in the 2008 banking crisis and a change in strategy by GE to reduce their exposure to financial services. In 2013, the Ratanarak family controlled 25% of the bank's equity and was the bank's largest shareholder.

The family also successfully recapitalised Siam City Cement by selling part of the family's equity to Holderbank (later to become Holcim). Contemporary newspaper reports wrongly suggested that the proceeds from the sale of equity to Holderbank was used by the family to recapitalise Bank of Ayudhya. However, as part of the terms of the sale, the full proceeds received by the family from Holderbank – as well as additional funds from the Ratanarak Group – were reinvested in Siam City Cement via a rights issue to recapitalise the business and the capital injected by the family into the bank came instead from contingency reserves. In 2013, the Ratanarak family controlled 47% of the equity in Siam City Cement which had a market value of US$3.2 billion and no significant debt with Holcim holding 27.5% of the shares. In 1998, prior to the deal with Holderbank, the family had controlled slightly more than 50% of the company.

== See also ==
- Krit Ratanarak
- Chachchon Ratanarak
- Bank of Ayudhya
- Bangkok Broadcasting & Television
