= Hattha Bank =

Cambodian microfinance company

- Company type: Microfinance institution
- Industry: Financial services
- Predecessor: Hattha Kaksekar
- Founded: 2001; 25 years ago as a Limited company
- Founder: Food security project
- Headquarters: Cambodia
- Number of locations: 177 branches (2020)
- Area served: Cambodia
- Products: Loans, Savings and deposits, money transfer, ATMs, mobile banking and Payroll services
- Owner: MUFG Bank
- Parent: Krungrsi Bank of Ayudhya
- Website: www.hatthabank.com

Hattha Bank (previously Hattha Kaksekar Limited) (HKL) (translated literally from the Khmer, "A Helping Hand for Farmers") is a Cambodian bank and microfinance institution (MFI) in Cambodia.

As of 2014, its loan portfolio was ranked fourth and it had the third largest saving portfolio among Cambodia microfinance institutions. In 2016 it was acquired by Krungrsi, a major bank in Thailand and in 2020 it converted to a full commercial bank.

== History ==
HKL is a former food security project launched in the Pursat Province in Cambodia by OCSD/Oxfam–Quebec in 1994. It was registered as an NGO with the Ministry of Interior in 1996. In 2001, Hattha Kaksekar Limited was born after it registered to the Ministry of Commerce with an overall capital of $77,850 and was offered a three-years MIcro-finance Instituation (MFI) license. When it reached sustainability, the National Bank of Cambodia granted a permanent license to HKL in 2007 and a Micro-finance deposit-taking institution license in 2011.

In 2016 Krungrsi is a subsidiary of Bank of Ayudhya, a commercial bank in Thailand, and a member of MUFG Bank of Japan acquired Hattha Kaksekar.

In 2020 Hattha Kaksekar became a registered commercial bank when it obtained a banking license by the National Bank of Cambodia and was renamed as Hattha Bank.

In July 2023, a bank employee was arrested for allegedly stealing more than $600,000 from a customer.

== Demographics ==
As of 2011, the banks customer base were 66% rural. According to a Microfinanza rating report, 40% of its lending activities funded agricultural projects.

In 2013, women clients represented between 60% and 80% of overall customers.

By 2014, HKL had launched products for Small and Medium Enterprises (SMEs) and Micro-Small and Medium Enterprises (MSMEs).

== Capital structure ==
In September 2016, Krungsri entered Cambodia with the acquisition of Hattha Kaksekar, the country's fourth largest microfinance institution.

HKL has previous eight shareholders:

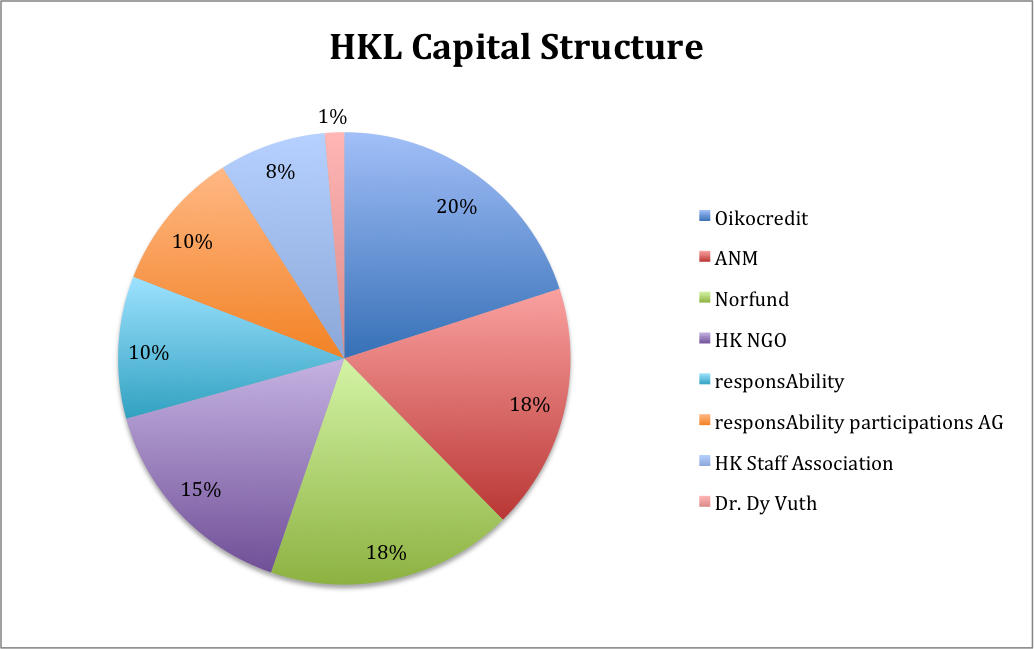
HKL capital structure, HKL 2013 Annual report

- Oikocredit is the first private investor in microfinance. It funds trade cooperatives and SMEs and it bolsters small businesses through MFIs.
- ANM Fund is a Dutch-based mutual fund for microfinance.
- Norfund, Norwegian state-owned fund, invests in financial institutions, SME investment funds, renewable energies and agriculture.
- HK NGO is the former food security project that was restructured and became a shareholder of HKL.
- responsAbility Participations AG is an investment stock corporation from Switzerland. It invests mostly in financial institution in the developing world.
- responsAbility Investments AG is an asset manager specialized in sectors related to development.
- HKL staff is an association that gathers all staff members who bought HKL shares.
- Dr. Dy Davuth is a personal investor who has experience in microfinance, administration and business development.

== Branch network ==
In December 2014, HKL office network accounted for 151 offices mainly in rural areas spread among 25 provinces.

== Products ==
- Loans - Creditworthiness, loan size and loan currency are the criteria on which interest rates setting is based. Concerning the use of the loan, supporting business activities or personal consumption can both be funded. In 2013, new products were launched: Green loans and Khmer Student loans.
- Savings and Deposit - The MFI developed three types of accounts: Voluntary savings: savings accounts and VIP accounts, Recurrent savings: Planned savings accounts, Kid and retirement accounts, and Fixed deposits: a form of capitalization designed for high income. Clients can also use this product for charity purpose.
- Money Transfer - National money transfers to family, relatives or business partners transit via HKL branch network.
- ATMs - Launched at the end of 2012, ATM network accounted for 38 machines in Cambodia in August 2013. It allows customers to perform cash and non-cash transactions.
- MyMobile Banking - Mobile banking services allow customers to perform transactions such as inquiries about an account balance, look-up for an ATM location, mobile top up, bill payments and transfer funds. In addition, HKL has launched SMS notifications.
- Payroll Service
