= Krit Ratanarak =

Thai businessman (1946–2025)

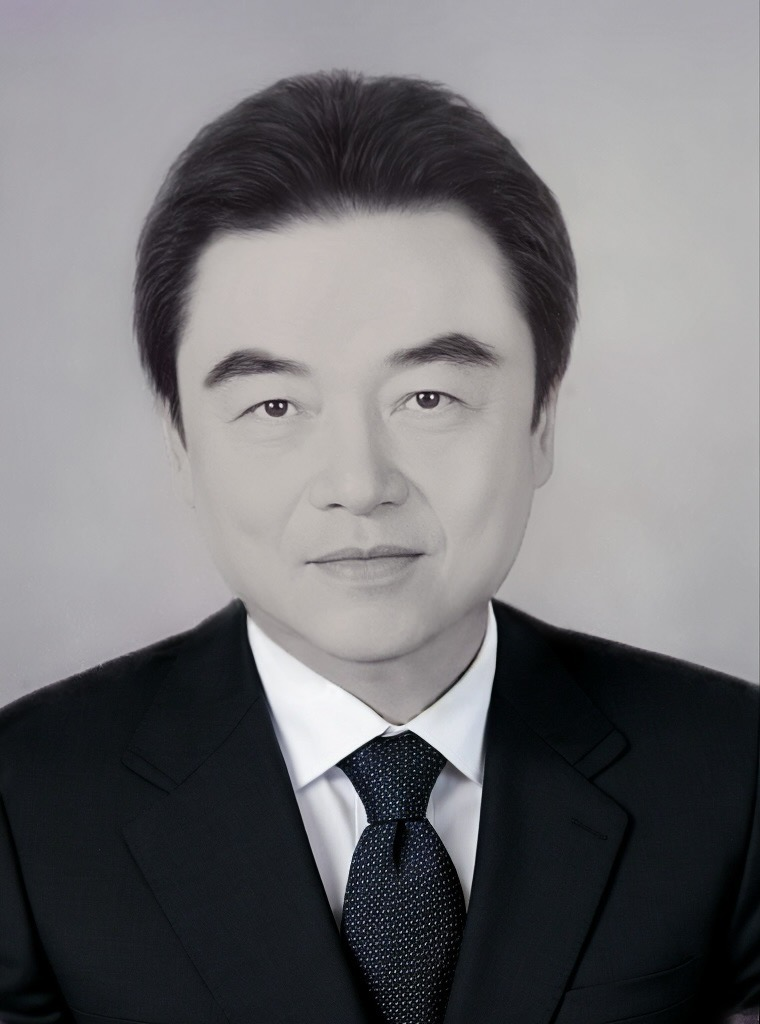
- Born: 19 April 1946; Bangkok, Thailand
- Died: 23 October 2025 (aged 79)
- Occupation: Businessman
- Title: Chairman, Bangkok Broadcasting & Television Company
- Spouses: Chaiskran Hiranpruk PhD (divorced) Srisakul Promphan (divorced)
- Children: Chachchon Ratanarak
- Parent(s): Chuan Ratanarak; Sasithorn Ratanarak

Krit Ratanarak (Chinese: 李智正; pinyin: Lǐ Zhìzhèng; Thai: กฤตย์ รัตนรักษ์; RTGS: Krit Rattanarak; 19 April 1946 – 23 October 2025) was a Thai-Chinese billionaire businessman who was the chairman of Bangkok Broadcasting & Television Company (operator of Channel 7) and head of one of Thailand's leading family business groups. He was also a member of the Thai Senate. The Ratanarak family have substantial holdings in a number of Thai-based companies including Bank of Ayudhya (branded and commonly referred to as Krungsri Bank) (SET:BAY), Siam City Cement (SET:SCCC), Allianz Ayudhya Capital (SET:AYUD), Matching Maximize Solution (SET:MATCH), Media Studio, Grand Canal Land (SET:GLAND) and Eastern Star Real Estate (SET:ESTAR) as well as holding a majority stake in Bangkok Broadcasting & Television, which operates Thailand's Channel 7. The group also owns HR Pro Security and Services, one of the largest security firms in Thailand.

== Background ==
Krit Ratanarak was born on 19 April 1946, the eldest of six children with five sisters, four of whom now live outside Thailand. He came from a family steeped in both business legacy and tradition: his father, Chuan Ratanarak, was one of Thailand's last great self-made business titans who founded Bank of Ayudhya (now Krungsri Bank), Siam City Cement, and Bangkok Broadcasting & Television, while his mother came from a wealthy merchant family that had prospered for a few generations before her. Krit was divorced with one son, Chachchon, born in 1972.

The Ratanarak (or Li, in Chinese) family are known to be very private. Forbes call them "a very secretive clan," and Krit’s son Chachchon has been described as being "influential while staying below the radar". The Ratanaraks are one of the few remaining ‘old money’ families in Thailand. It is said that Krit inherited the work ethos of his father and preferred to work in privacy, rarely appearing in public and press.

Ratanarak died on 23 October 2025, at the age of 79.

== Career ==
Krit was one of the most successful businessmen in Thailand. He joined Bank of Ayudhya in 1972, becoming President in 1982 and CEO in 1990. In 1981, Krit became Thailand’s youngest senator at the age of 35, serving for four terms. In 1993, he became chairman and CEO of the bank, chairman of BBTV, chairman of Siam City Cement and chairman of Ayudhya Insurance.

Krit's business acumen and financial influence were widely recognized. In April 1997, he was described as "the man with the most money", highlighting Ratanarak family's financial standing.

In the late 1990s, Krit navigated Bank of Ayudhya and the other family businesses through the worst of the Asian financial crisis keep in the group intact, the Ratanaraks were one of only 8 business groups that remained in Thailand’s top 40 from 1979 to 2009. The Ratanarak Group emerged from the crisis with Krit at the head of one of the top five business families in Thailand, and one of three of Thailand’s most powerful banking families along with the Sophonpanich and Lamsam families. In the years after the crisis Krit strengthened the major family businesses by introducing outside capital and international management expertise.

=== Post-financial crisis business reorganisation ===
Krit recapitalised Siam City Cement in 1998 by selling part of the family’s equity to Holderbank (later to become Holcim). Contemporary newspaper reports wrongly suggested that the proceeds from the sale of equity to Holderbank was used by the family to recapitalize Bank of Ayudhya. However, as part of the terms of the sale, the full proceeds received by the family from Holderbank – as well as additional funds from the Ratanarak Group – were reinvested in Siam City Cement via a rights issue to recapitalize the business and the capital injected by the family into the bank came instead from contingency reserves. Holderbank became strategic partner, and in 1999, after completing debt restructuring and refinancing, Siam City Cement increased its capital to 3 billion Baht, and the proceeds were used to upgrade its production facilities and operations. In 2013, the Ratanarak family controlled 47% of the equity in Siam City Cement which had a market value of US $3.2 billion and no significant debt with Holcim holding 27.5% of the shares. In 1998, prior to the deal with Holderbank, the family had controlled slightly more than 50% of the company.

While other banks closed or were nationalized, Krit completed a recapitalization of Bank of Ayudhya, and continued to improve its performance in the post-crisis aftermath. In 1996 before the crisis, the bank had market capitalisation of US $4 billion and this had risen to US $7 billion in 2014. The family shareholding in the bank was reduced in 2007 from 35% to 25% to comply with a reduction in the maximum permitted holding under new banking regulations which came into force in 2008. The reduction in ownership was not achieved by a sale of family’s holdings; rather, it was executed as a strategic investment by GE Capital that increased the bank's registered share capital and strengthened its consumer lending business with world-class standards. The family previously brought in GE Capital in 2007 to enhance banking operations and install best practice. Following a change in GE's strategy to reduce their exposure to financial services in 2013, GE Capital sold their holdings to Japan’s Mitsubishi UFJ Financial Group (MUFJ) following losses incurred in the 2008 banking crisis, and a change in strategy by GE to reduce their exposure to financial services. In 2014, the Ratanarak family controlled 25% of the bank’s equity with the remaining equity held by MUFJ. Krit's penchant for employing world-class strategic partners is also reflected in the partnership with Germany's Allianz Group in insurance business.

=== 2010s ===
According to press reports in March 2012, Krit was working to transform the Rama III area of Bangkok into a major commercial centre.

According to Forbes, the Ratanarak family’s holdings in the group businesses in January 2015 were estimated to be worth US$5.4 billion, based on publicly known assets and excludes private assets and property. In 2012, the Thai publication ‘Which Family is Richest’ reported the Ratanarak family as having holdings in excess of US$10 billion since 1998 when other assets are included.

=== 2020s ===
In August 2024, the Ratanarak Group strengthened its long-standing control over Siam City Cement by acquiring Jardine Cycle & Carriage Ltd.'s 25.24% shareholding for US$353.97 million. This move solidified the Ratanarak family's status as the founder and primary shareholders. After a subsequent tender offer to minority shareholders, the Group's total ownership of Siam City Cement (a company with combined assets of ฿82 billion, or US$2.5 billion) increased to approximately 79%. Additionally, the Ratanarak family holds an interest of approximately 20% in Krungsri Bank, which has combined assets of ฿2.62 trillion (US$80.4 billion).

== Bibliography ==
- Hiscock, Geoff, Asia's wealth club: who's really who in business -- the top 100 billionaires in Asia, Nicholas Brealey Pub., 1997, ISBN 1-85788-162-1
