= Responsability investments =

Swiss financial services company

responsAbility Investments AG
- Company type: Private
- Industry: Financial Services; Asset Management
- Founded: 2003; 23 years ago
- Headquarters: Zürich, Switzerland
- Area served: Emerging Markets
- Key people: Nadia Nikolova (CEO); Emmanuel Deblanc (CBD)
- Products: open and closed investment funds
- Total assets: USD 5.5 billion
- Number of employees: 240
- Parent: M&G plc (2022–present)
- Website: responsability.com

Responsability Investments AG, stylised as responsAbility, is a private Swiss enterprise, founded in 2003 and headquartered in Zürich. The company invests in private markets across emerging economies with the goal of achieving financial returns while delivering measurable social and environmental impact.

The investment strategy focuses on three thematic priorities that contribute directly to the implementation of the UN Sustainable Development Goals (SDGs):

- Climate Finance: Supporting projects that reduce greenhouse gas emissions and expand renewable energy infrastructure.
- Financial Inclusion: Financing micro, small, and medium-sized enterprises (MSMEs) to strengthen local economies.
- Sustainable Food: Promoting agricultural and food systems that ensure sustainable nutrition for a growing global population.

== History ==
The company was founded in April 2003 in Zurich. The founding idea emerged in 2001, when three professionals from finance and development came together: investment banker Klaus Tischhauser, sustainability expert Leo Bächler, and microfinance consultant Armin Villiger. Villiger and Bächler traveled together through Tanzania and there experienced the impact of microfinance. Tischhauser had travelled a two-year bicycle journey through over 20 African countries.

responsAbility launched its first fund—the Global Microfinance Fund—later in 2003. It expanded its thematic scope in 2005 to include sustainable food, and in 2014 to include climate finance.

On May 3, 2022, M&G plc completed the acquisition of responsAbility Investments AG.

== Investment approach and impact ==
Since inception, responsAbility has invested over USD 16.5 billion in approximately 70 countries. The focus is on supporting portfolio companies with measurable impact—such as access to finance, renewable energy, and sustainable agriculture.

As of 31 March 2025, the company managed approximately USD 5.5 billion in assets, with around 300 active portfolio companies.

== Global presence ==
responsAbility employs more than 270 professionals (as of March 2025) and operates from the following international offices:

- Zurich (headquarters)
- Mumbai (India)
- Tbilisi (Georgia)
- Lima (Peru)
- Nairobi (Kenya)
- Paris (France)

== Products and structure ==
responsAbility offers a broad range of investment products in private markets, including public and private funds, tailor-made mandates, and structured finance. Investments are primarily made through debt and equity instruments.

Its three core thematic strategies include:

- Financial inclusion: Supporting financial institutions that provide credit and services to small businesses and entrepreneurs.
- Climate finance: Financing energy efficiency, renewable energy, and low-carbon infrastructure.
- Sustainable food: Investing in agri-food businesses that operate resource-efficiently and promote food security.

Most investment products are targeted at institutional and professional investors.

== Specific investments ==
Reports and information about specific activities of reponsAbility funds are available in international publications such as The Guardian, Neue Zürcher Zeitung and the Microcapital Organization.

== Regulation and ownership ==
responsAbility is regulated by the Swiss Financial Market Supervisory Authority (FINMA) as an asset manager of collective investment schemes.

Since 2022, it has been a subsidiary of UK-based M&G plc, which as of 2024 managed over GBP 370 billion in assets.
