= Bank of Ayudhya =

Commercial bank in Thailand

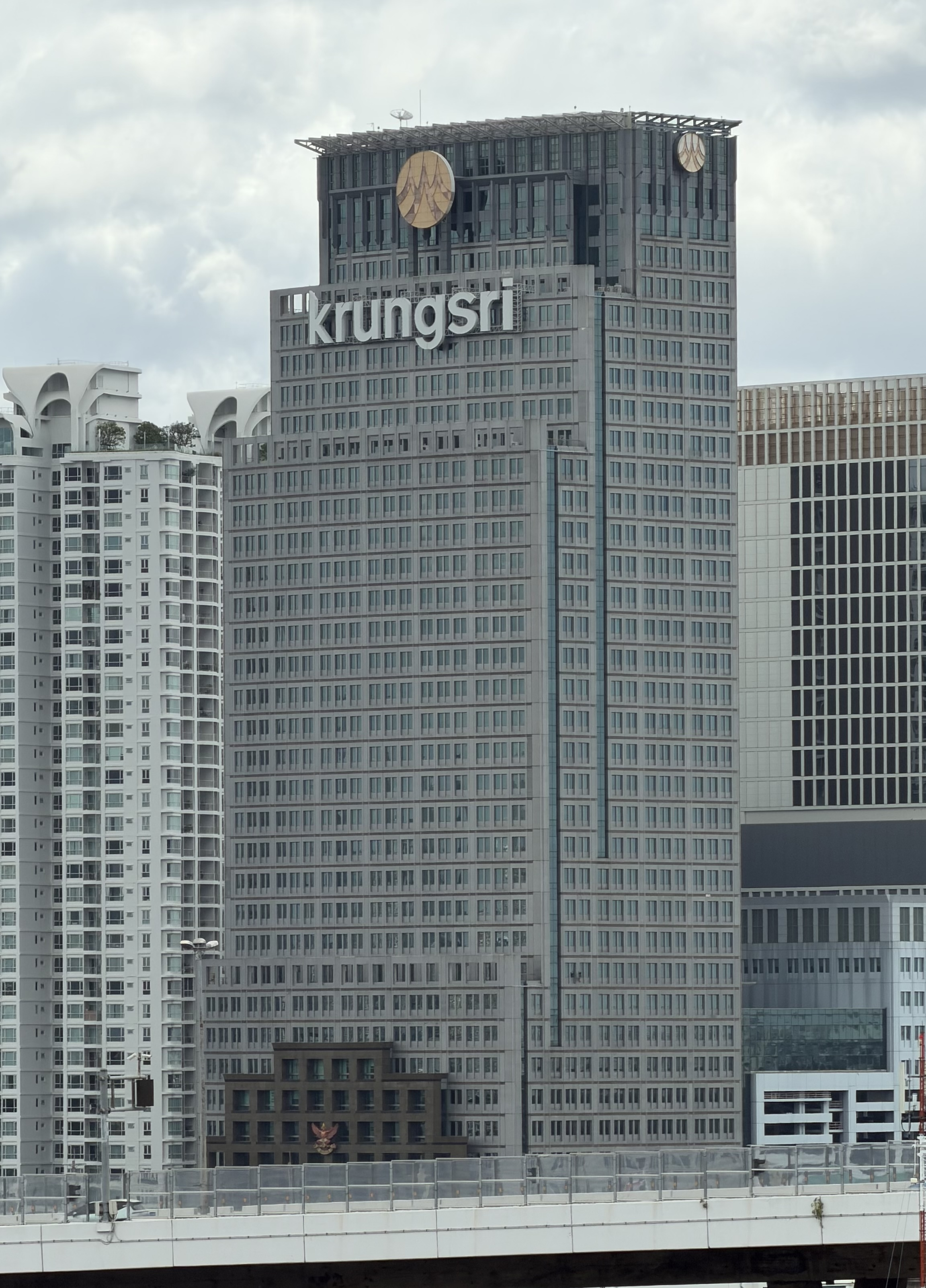
- Bank of Ayudhya Head Office in Bangkok
- Native name: Bank of Ayudhya PCL (ธนาคารกรุงศรีอยุธยา จำกัด (มหาชน))
- Type: Public
- Traded as: SET: BAY
- ISIN: TH0023010000
- Industry: banking
- Founded: 1 April 1945; 81 years ago
- Headquarters: 1222 Rama III Rd, Yan Nawa, Bangkok 10120
- Key people: Kenichi Yamato (president and CEO)
- Services: Banking
- Revenue: ▲138,948 million baht (as of Dec 2023)
- Net income: ▲32,929 million baht (as of Dec 2023)
- Total assets: ▲2,768,295 million baht (as of Dec 2023)
- Total equity: ▲371,454 million baht (as of Dec 2023)
- Number of employees: Krungsri Group 52,146 / Bank of Ayudhya 13,952 (as of Dec 2023)
- Parent: MUFG Bank
- Rating: Moody’s : A3
- Website: krungsri.com

Bank of Ayudhya Public Company Limited, branded and commonly referred to as Krungsri (sometimes stylized as krungsri), is the fifth-largest bank in Thailand in terms of assets, loans, and deposits, and one of Thailand's six Domestic Systemically Important Banks (D-SIBs). Krungsri is a member of the Mitsubishi UFJ Financial Group.

== History ==
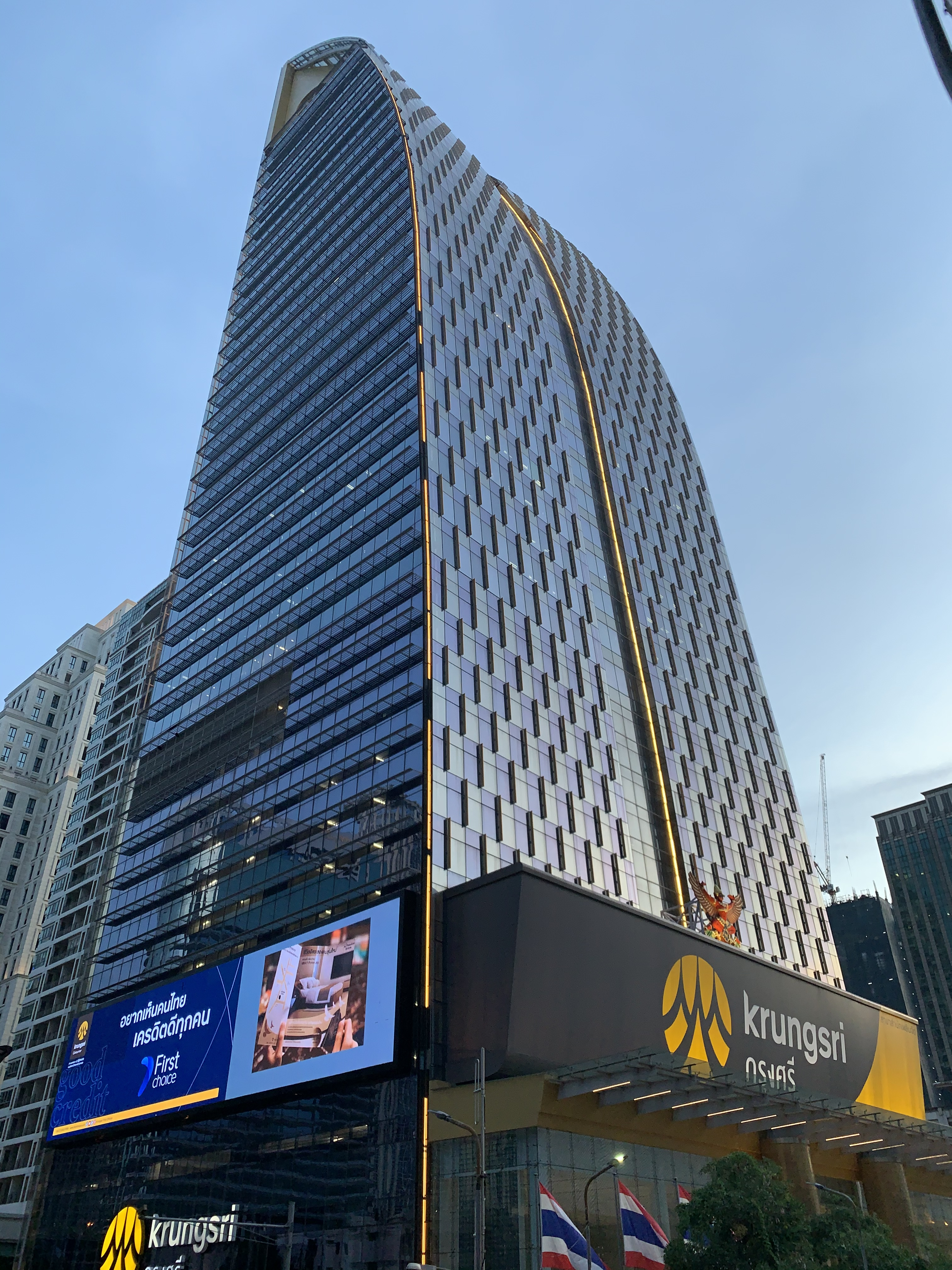
Krungsri Ploenchit Tower, one of the offices in Bangkok.

The Bank of Ayudhya was established on 27 January 1945 in Phra Nakhon Si Ayutthaya Province, the former capital of the Kingdom of Siam until the city's destruction in 1767. The bank opened its doors on April 1, 1945, with registered capital of one million baht.

In 1970, the bank's head office was relocated to Ploenchit Road, coinciding with the bank's receiving a royal warrant of appointment and garuda emblem from King Bhumibol Adulyadej on 15 May 1970. The bank was listed on the Stock Exchange of Thailand on 26 September 1977, trading symbol, "BAY".

On 3 January 2007, Krungsri and GE Capital became strategic partners. GE Capital and Ratanarak Group were major shareholders with a 33 percent and a 25 percent stake in BAY, respectively.

In September 2012, GE announced the sale of 7.6 percent of its stake in Krungsri via a number of block trades, reducing their ownership to 25.33 percent.

== Name and brand ==
After having undergone changes in the late 2000s, including the acquisition of GE Money Thailand, and Bank of Ayudhya unified its subsidiaries and rebranded. In 2014, the bank rebranded as "Krungsri" (shortened from กรุงศรีอยุธยา, "capital city/revered city Ayutthaya"), the bank's formal name and use tagline Make Life Simple. In the media, the formal and colloquial names are used interchangeably, while for the bank's own marketing (such as logos, URL, storefronts, ATMs, bank cards and promotional material) "Krungsri" is used.

In February 2023, Krungsri launched its brand refresh and updated Thai slogan of “Make Life Simple” (“ชีวิตง่าย ได้ทุกวัน”).

== Distribution network ==
- 565 domestic branches (525 Banking Branches and 40 Auto Business Branches)
- Representative Office (Myanmar): 1
- ATMs: 5,605
- Exchange Booths: 42
- Krungsri Exclusive: 44
- Krungsri The Advisory: 6
- Krungsri Private Banking: 1
- Krungsri Business Centers: 61
- First Choice Branches + Dealers: 89 + 21,307 respectively
- Krungsri Auto Dealers: 8,636
- Microfinance Branches (TIDLOR): 1,430
- Overseas Commercial Bank (HTB): 171
- EDC Machines: 51,777
- Banking Agents Touch Points: > 161,010

== Major developments and acquisitions ==
- On 3 January 2007, Bank of Ayudhya (Krungsri) and GE Money, a global consumer financial services firm, became strategic partners.
- On 14 February 2008, Krungsri completed its acquisition of GE Capital Auto Lease Public Company, Ltd. (GECAL). On the transfer date, GECAL recorded 78.01 billion baht in assets and 75.28 billion baht in outstanding loans, resulting in a 17 percent increase in the bank's portfolio on that date. GECAL was later renamed Ayudhya Capital Auto Lease Company Limited (AYCAL).
- On 8 April 2009, Krungsri completed the acquisition of AIG Retail Bank PCL (AIGRB) and AIG Card (Thailand) Company Limited (AIGCC). The value of the transaction was 1.6 billion baht. Krungsri's acquisition of both entities resulted in an increase of 32.8 billion baht in the bank's assets, 21.9 billion baht in loans, 18.6 billion baht in deposits, and approximately 222,000 credit cards.
- On 9 September 2009, Krungsri completed the acquisition of CFG Services Co., Ltd. (CFGS), a subsidiary of American International Group. CFGS, better known as "Srisawad Money on Wheels", is one of Thailand's providers of micro-finance with a presence in the title loan market.
- On 5 November 2009, Krungsri completed the acquisition of GE Capital's consumer finance businesses in Thailand. The acquisition of GEMT accelerated the growth of Krungsri's consumer banking portfolio by increasing its retail lending portfolio from 36 percent to 42 percent of Krungsri's total loans. With the addition of GEMT's current portfolio, Krungsri is the largest card issuer in Thailand with over three million cards in circulation, serving over eight million customers.
- In March 2012, Krungsri completed the acquisition of HSBC Thailand's retail banking businesses, including credit cards, personal loans, mortgages, and deposits with an estimated consideration of 3.6 billion baht. As a result of the transaction, Krugnsri Group's assets grew by roughly 17.5 billion baht or 1.8 percent, increasing retail loans from 45 to 46 percent of total loans.
- On 5 January 2015, the Bank of Tokyo-Mitsubishi UFJ, Ltd. (BTMU) Bangkok Branch was successfully integrated into Krungsri, in accordance with the One Presence Policy of the Bank of Thailand. Krungsri issued 1,281,618,026 ordinary shares to BTMU for the transfer of the business of BTMU Bangkok Branch.
- 22 April 2015 Krungsri opened a representative office in Yangon, Myanmar, with an aim to support Krungsri's corporate and SME clients in capturing business opportunities in the country.
- 13 September 2016 Krungsri acquired Hattha Kaksekar Limited (HKL), a leading microfinance in Cambodia, with becoming a Krungsri Group subsidiary.
- 27 March 2017 Krungsri set up new subsidiary, Krunsri Finnovate Company Limited, Venture Capital business under the regulatory and investment guideline set up by the Bank of Thailand.
- 27 September 2017 Krungsri was recognized as a domestic systemically important bank (D-SIB) by the Bank of Thailand - assessing not only our size but also our interconnectedness and the role Krungsri plays in contributing to financial sector stability and development as well as economic growth for Thailand.
- In August 2020, Hattha Kaksekar Limited, Krungsri's wholly owned leading deposit-taking microfinance institution in Cambodia, successfully obtained regulatory approvals to operate as a commercial bank under the name Hattha Bank Plc.
- In October 2020, Krungsri successfully acquired 50% stake in SB Finance, Inc. operating consumer finance business in the Philippines.
- In March 2023, Krungsri successfully acquired Capital Nomura Securities PCL. (CNS) and has been rebranded as Krungsri Capital Securities PCL. (KCS).
- In May 2023, Krungsri successfully acquired 50% charter capital in SHBank Finance Company Limited (SHB Finance) in Vietnam.
- In June 2023, Krungsri successfully acquired Home Credit in the Philippines, which are 1) HC Consumer Finance Philippines, Inc. (HCPH), 2) HCPH Financing 1, Inc. (HCPH1), 3) HCPH Insurance Brokerage, Inc. (HCPHI)
- In October 2023, Krungsri successfully acquired Home credit in Indonesia.

== Subsidiaries, Joint Ventures, and Associate ==
Bank of Ayudhya's investments in subsidiaries, associates and joint ventures net as of 31 December 2016 and 2015.

- Auto HP
  - Ayudhya Capital Auto Lease PCL. (AYCAL)
  - Krungsri Leasing Services Co., Ltd. (KLS)
- Microfinance
  - Ngern Tid Lor Public Company Limited (TIDLOR)
  - Krungsri Non-Deposit Taking Microfinance Institution Co., Ltd. (KSM)
- Commercial Bank
  - Hattha Bank Plc. (HTB)
- Securities
  - Krungsri Securities PCL. (KSS)
  - Krungsri Capital Securities PCL. (KCS)
- Investment
  - Krungsri Asset Management Co., Ltd. (KSAM)
- Leasing
  - Ayudhya Development Leasing Co., Ltd. (ADLC)
- IT Services
  - Krungsri Nimble Co., Ltd. (KSN)
- Asset Mgmt.
  - Krungsri Ayudhya AMC Ltd. (KAMC)
- Credit Card
  - Krungsriayudhya Card Co., Ltd. (KCC)
- Personal Loan & Sales Finance
  - Ayudhya Capital Services Co., Ltd. (AYCAP)
  - Lotus’s Money Services Ltd. (LMP)
  - General Card Services Ltd. (GCS)
- Debt Collection
  - Total Services Solutions PCL. (TSS)
- Support
  - Siam Realty and Services Security Co., Ltd. (SRS)
  - Hattha Services Co., Ltd. (HSL)
- Life Insurance Broker
  - Krungsri Genesis Company Limited (KGS)
  - Lotus’s Life Assurance Broker Ltd. (LLAB)
- Non-Life Insurance Broker
  - Krungsri General Insurance Broker Ltd. (KGIB)
  - Lotus’s General Insurance Broker Ltd. (LGIB)
- Venture Capital
  - Krungsri Finnovate Co. Ltd. (KFin)
- Consumer Finance
  - SB Finance, Inc. (SBF)
  - SHBank Finance Company Limited (SHBF)
  - HC Consumer Finance Philippines, Inc. (HCPH)
  - HCPH Financeing 1, Inc. (HCPH1)
  - HCPH Insurance Brokerage, Inc. (HCPHI)
  - PT. Home Credit Indonesia (HCID)

== Shareholding Structure (as of 7 September 2023, Latest record date) ==
Rank	Major Shareholders	Shares #	Shares %
1	MUFG Bank, Ltd. BAY Account	5,655,332,146	76.88
2	Stronghold Assets Company Limited	166,536,980	2.26
3	The Great Luck Equity Company Limited	166,478,940	2.26
4	GL Asset Company Limited	166,414,640	2.26
5	BBTV Satelvision Company Limited	166,151,114	2.26
6	BBTV Asset Management Company Limited	163,112,900	2.22
7	Bangkok Broadcasting & T.V. Co., Ltd.	160,789,220	2.19
8	Mahakij Holdings Co., Ltd.	158,726,810	2.16
9	Tun Rung Rueng Co., Ltd.	157,889,440	2.15
10	Super Assets Co., Ltd.	51,421,714	0.70
11	C.K.R Company Limited	48,528,834	0.66
	Other shareholders	294,379,035	4.00
	TOTAL	7,355,761,77	100.00

As of 9 September 2016

== See also ==
List of banks in Thailand
