= Erawan =

Erawan is the Thai name of the mythological elephant Airavata. The name may also refer to:

- Erawan Garnier, a French-Thai footballer
- Erawan Hotel, a former hotel in Bangkok
- Erawan Shrine, a shrine to the god Brahma in Bangkok, located at the hotel
- Grand Hyatt Erawan, a hotel in Bangkok, replacing the Erawan
- The Erawan Group, a Thai hospitality company which owns the new hotel
- Erawan Museum, a private museum in Samut Prakan Province, Thailand
- Erawan National Park, a national park in Kanchanaburi Province, Thailand, named after the Erawan Waterfalls within the park
- Erawan District, a district (amphoe) of Loei Province, Thailand

== See also ==
- Airavat (disambiguation)
