= Amarin =

Amarin may refer to:

- Amarin Corporation, an Irish-American biopharmaceutical company
- Amarinus, a Roman Catholic saint associated with Saint Praejectus
- Saint-Amarin, a commune in France (named after the saint)
- Amarin Group, a Thai media and publishing company
- Amarin TV, a television channel in Thailand, owned by Amarin Group
- Amarin Plaza, a shopping mall in Thailand
- Amarin Plaza Company, a former name of The Erawan Group, a Thai hospitality company
- Wat Amarinthraram, a Buddhist temple in Thailand
- Eh Amarin Phouthong, a Kun Khmer boxer from Cambodia
