= Gaysorn Amarin =

Shopping mall and office building complex in Bangkok

- เกษรอัมรินทร์
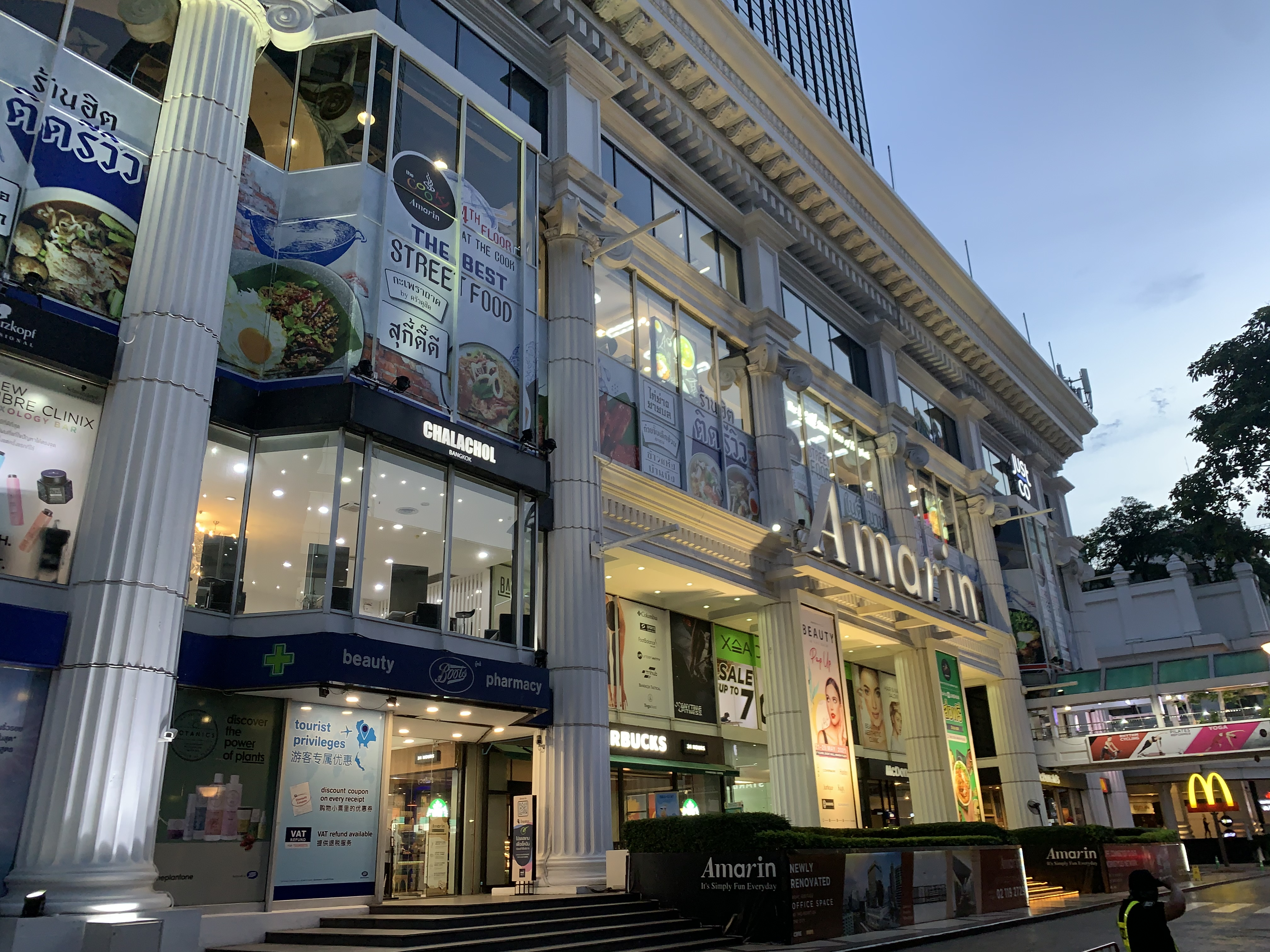
- As Amarin Plaza, in 2021
- Location: 496–502 Phloen Chit Rd, Lumphini, Pathum Wan, Bangkok, 10330
- Coordinates: 13°44′37″N 100°32′29″E
- Opened: 1985
- Num. of stores: 300+
- Floors: 5

Gaysorn Amarin (Thai: เกษรอัมรินทร์), previously known as Amarin Plaza (อัมรินทร์พลาซ่า), is a shopping mall and office building complex located in the Ratchaprasong shopping district in the city centre of Bangkok. It comprises a five-storey shopping mall podium with over 300 shops, above which rises the twenty-two-storey Amarin Tower.

The mall opened as Amarin Plaza in 1985, with the Sogo department store as its main anchor. The building, designed by Rangsan Torsuwan, features a postmodern design combining Greco-Roman elements with a modernist glass façade, which became a commercial success and a sensation among developers but was heavily criticized within architect circles. The complex was operated by the Amarin Plaza Company, which later became The Erawan Group, until 2007, when it was sold to Gaysorn Group. It is now part of the Gaysorn Village complex.

== History ==
=== Development ===
The complex, originally known as Amarin Plaza, was the first property of the Amarin Plaza Company, now known as The Erawan Group. It was the first real estate venture by the Vongkusolkit family, whose primary business was in the sugar industry through the Mitr Phol Group. Isara Vongkusolkit conceived the project after being offered a deal with the Srivikorn family, who owned the land, and the family partnered with the Wattanavekin family to establish the company in 1982.

The building, designed by architect Rangsan Torsuwan, features the juxtaposition of Greco-Roman elements—including Ionic columns, a frieze and cornices—with a modernist glass curtain wall. According to Rangsan, he did not set out to create a postmodern design, but adapted according to what he expected would appeal to tenants' tastes. In fact, some of the project owners opposed his design, but he insisted, guaranteeing that it would sell, or he would forfeit his fees and also come up with a new design for free. It was a great success; the project sold 80 percent of units before construction began. The building's design became a sensation among Thai architects and developers, starting a trend where Greco-Roman elements were widely used to signify a project's prestige. However, it was heavily criticized within architect circles as an inappropriate use of classical elements, which fit poorly especially in the Thai context.

Construction began in 1983, but initially faced problems with its piling system, prompting the owners to switch from concrete drilled piles to a bored system. This then made very slow progress due to the soil structure, and the construction was again switched to steel drilled piles, which faced more problems as the construction was halted by a court order as the neighbouring Erawan Hotel sued over noise pollution. Despite the setbacks, the project's advance payments provided it with financial security, and it was accordingly able to reduce its loan from Siam Commercial Bank, initially estimated at 270 million baht (US$10.8M at the time), to less than 100 million ($4M). The security also gave it advantage over competitors such as Pantip Plaza, which opened a few months earlier.

=== Operations ===
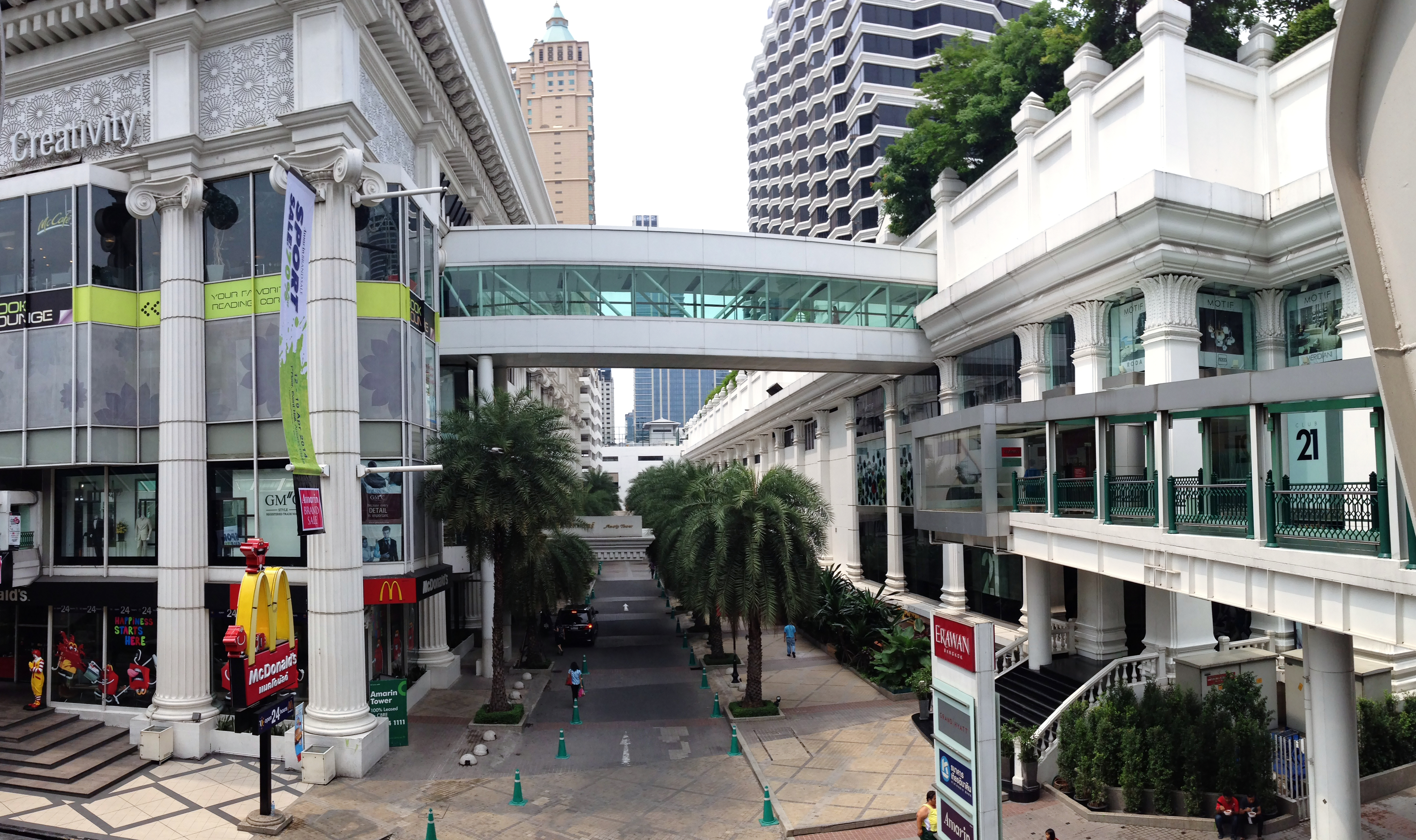
Amarin Plaza (left) is connected to the Grand Hyatt Erawan (right). Both properties were developed by the present-day Erawan Group and designed by Rangsan Torsuwan.

The shopping centre opened as Amarin Plaza in 1985, with the Sogo department store as its anchor—the Japanese chain's first international branch. This prompted Mahboonkrong Center—another competitor which opened the same year—to also introduce the Tokyu Department Store. Amarin Plaza also featured the first McDonald's branch in Thailand, which was allocated a 460-square-metre (5,000 sq ft) prime spot at the front of the building.

Sogo became the household name by which people referred to the building. However, it faced heavy losses in its first few years as the number of newly opening departments stores brought intense competition. Sogo would continue to operate, opening a second location at the Grand Hyatt Erawan hotel (a sister property which replaced the original Erawan in 1991), but closed down soon after Sogo in Japan scaled down its international operations in 2000.

In 2007, The Erawan Group sold Amarin Plaza to the Srivikorn-owned Gaysorn Group (which operated what was then Gaysorn Plaza on the opposite side of the road), as the impending end of the property's thirty-year lease limited renovation prospects. The mall was incorporated as part of the rebranded Gaysorn Village retail complex in 2017, and underwent major renovations from 2022 to 2024, after which it is set to reopen as Gaysorn Amarin.

== Facilities ==
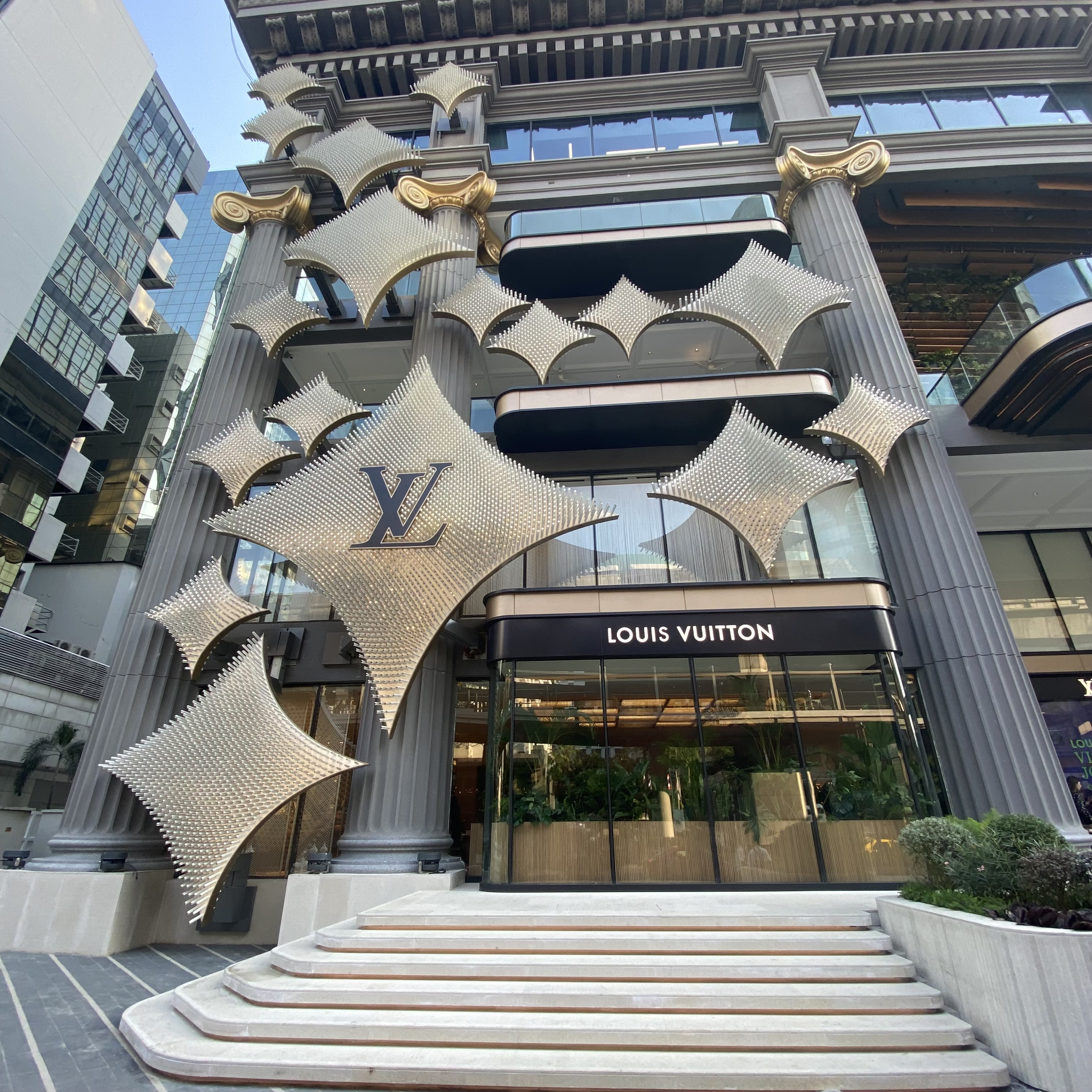
LV The Place Bangkok

Gaysorn Amarin is located on Phloen Chit Road, near the southeast corner of Ratchaprasong Intersection, in Bangkok's Pathum Wan District. It is connected via skywalk to the Chit Lom Station of the BTS Skytrain, as well as the other Gaysorn Village buildings opposite and the many other shopping malls in the area. It also has a direct footbridge to the neighbouring Grand Hyatt Erawan. As of 2017, Amarin Plaza featured 55,000 square metres (590,000 sq ft) of gross retail area in its five storeys, which housed over 300 shops. It was particularly known for Thai arts and crafts shops, and also had a large food court. Amarin Tower has 21,000 square metres (230,000 sq ft) of office space for rent in the 22-storey building.

== See also ==
- List of shopping malls in Bangkok
- List of shopping malls in Thailand
