= Erewan =

Erewan can refer to:

- Yerevan in Armenia
- Erawan Waterfall in Erawan National Park, Kanchanaburi Province, Thailand

== See also ==
Erawan (disambiguation)
