= Praman Chansue =

Thai supreme court president

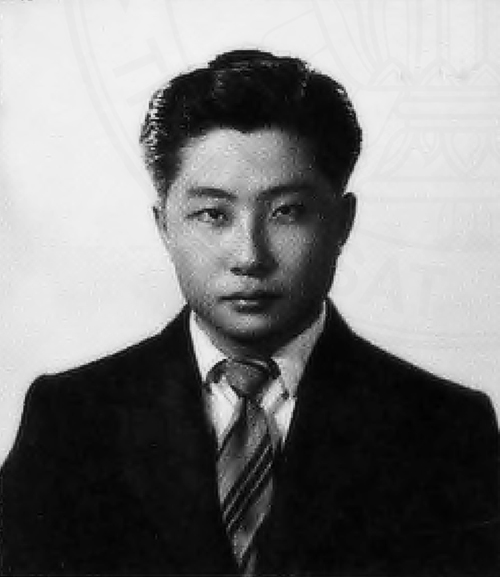
- Praman Chansue in 1959

President of Supreme Court of Thailand
- In office 1 October 1992 – 30 September 1996
- Monarch: Bhumibol Adulyadej
- Preceded by: Sawat Chotipanich
- Succeeded by: Sakda Mokkhamakkun

Personal details
- Born: 1 June 1936 Bangkok, Thailand
- Died: 7 February 2007 (aged 70) Bangkok, Thailand
- Spouse: Amphansi Chansue (m. 1961–2007)
- Parents: Yu Chansue (father); Chonghiang (mother)
- Relatives: Wan Chansue (half-brother)
- Education: Thammasat University; Yale University
- Occupation: Judge

Praman Chansue (Thai: ประมาณ ชันซื่อ; 1 June 1936 – 7 February 2007) was a Thai judge and the 28th president of the Supreme Court of Thailand (1992–1996).

During his tenure as the Supreme Court president in 1993, he survived an assassination allegedly plotted by Chulalongkorn University professor Rangsan Torsuwan.

== Birth ==
Praman was born on 1 June 1936 in Maha Phruettharam subdistrict, Bang Rak district, Phra Nakhon province, Siam (present-day Bangkok, Thailand).

His father was a Chinese man named Yu Chansue (Thai: ยู้ ชันซื่อ; died 1957). Yu married his first wife who was a Chinese woman in China and the two had four children, the third of whom was politician Wan Chansue (Thai: วรรณ ชันซื่อ). At the age of 20, Yu came to Siam and worked as a clerk in Sampheng, Bangkok, before entering the government service as an interpreter for the Ministry of Justice. Yu later studied law at the Ministry of Justice's Law School (present-day Faculty of Law, Thammasat University) and became a Thai barrister in 1923. In that year, Yu resigned from the government service to work as a private lawyer. He ran a law firm called Lawyer's Office at Yellow Bridge (Thai: สำนักทนายความสะพานเหลือง). In Siam, Yu married a Thai-Chinese woman, with whom he had four children. He married another Thai-Chinese woman named Chonghiang (Thai: จงเฮียง) and the two had three children, the second of whom was Praman.

== Education ==
Praman attended Mater Dei School for preschool education. Following that, he attended a Chinese school near a Buddhist temple, Wat Liap (present-day Wat Ratchaburana). Upon the outbreak of World War II, Praman had to drop out of the school and move to various places together with his family. After the war ended, Praman attended Assumption College for primary education. By that time, Praman was already 12 years old.

Upon graduation from Assumption College, Praman attended the Faculty of Law, Thammasat University, in 1956. Praman graduated from Thammasat University with a bachelor's degree in law at the age of 23. He then attended Yale University in 1959 and graduated in the following year with a master's degree in law.

Praman was awarded with an honorary doctorate in law by Pepperdine University on 17 May 1996.

Praman was also a Thai barrister.

== Career ==
Upon graduation from Yale University, Praman took and passed a judicial examination in 1962. He started his judicial career as a court of first instance judge trainee, a position he held for one year before being promoted to a ministerial judge (Thai: ผู้พิพากษาประจำกระทรวง)

In 1964, Praman was promoted to a judge of the Songkhla provincial court in Southern Thailand. In 1972, at the age of 36, he became chief judge of the Chiang Mai provincial court in Northern Thailand. In 1985, he was promoted to chief judge of Region IX, in charge of the southern provinces of Narathiwat, Pattani, Phatthalung, Satun, Songkhla, Trang, and Yala.

In 1990, Praman became permanent secretary to the Ministry of Justice. During the 1991 Thai judicial crisis, Praman was one of the judges that protested against the intervention of Praphat Uaichai (Thai: ประภาศน์ อวยชัย), then minister of justice, in the Supreme Court president election process, resulting in Praman being punished with dismissal from office. But King Bhumibol Adulyadej pardoned him, reducing the penalty to suspension of certain benefits instead. Praman was then demoted to a presiding judge in the Supreme Court (Thai: ผู้พิพากษาหัวหน้าคณะในศาลฎีกา).

On 2 November 1992, Praman was unanimously elected by the Judicial Commission to become new president of the Supreme Court but was rejected by the Council of Ministers twice. As the commission reaffirmed the election results, King Bhumibol Adulyadej appointed Praman president of the Supreme Court on 8 December 1992, with retroactive effect from 1 October 1992. Praman held the position until his retirement on 30 September 1996. During his presidency at the Supreme Court, Praman founded Praman Chansue Foundation to finance the training of court administrative officers and founded Tulakarn Chalermprakiat Hospital for provision of medical care to children at observation homes. The Judicial Training Institute of Thailand was also founded at his initiative.

== Assassination ==
The assassination of Praman became news in 1993 when Prathum Sutmani (Thai: ประทุม สุดมณี), a gunman suspected of assassinating a village chief in Nakhon Sawan province, revealed to police officer Praphan Nianphak (Thai: ประพันธ์ เนียรภาค) on 9 May 1993 that he had also been hired by a group of persons to find a gunman for assassinating Praman but he did not follow their request after learning that Praman was Supreme Court president. Following investigation, the police arrested the alleged hirers by luring them to Praman's house on 25 May 1993.

Praman told the police that he believed Chulalongkorn University dean of architecture Rangsan Torsuwan and his wife, Yindi Torsuwan (Thai: ยินดี ต่อสุวรรณ), were behind the assassination plot. On 16 July 1993, prosecutors charged Rangsan and three others with secondary participation in murder, citing several conflicts between him and Praman, including the transfer of Rangsan's wife from the post of regional chief judge to an inferior post of appellate court judge in which Rangsan believed Praman was involved, and other conflicts concerning construction projects, including the 3,000 million baht project of constructing a new Supreme Court house.

The trial took 15 years to be finished, during which the accused had to appear in court before 91 different judges on a total of 461 occasions. On 29 September 2008, the Bangkok South Criminal Court found Rangsan guilty and sentenced him to imprisonment for 25 years. However, Rangsan lodged an appeal and the Court of Appeal acquitted him on 21 September 2010, stating that the police investigation was doubtful, the confession of the gunman appeared to be involuntary, Praman's statements regarding Rangsan's roles appeared to be hearsay, the cited motivations could not be proven, and there was no proof that the assassination had really occurred. On 12 September 2011, Rangsan filed a civil case demanding a 3,000 million baht compensation from the Royal Thai Police and the Attorney General's Office.

The long-lasting case against Rangsan is believed to be the reason the renowned skyscraper Sathorn Unique Tower, Rangsan's development, has remained unfinished to date.

== Death ==
Before the court of first instance trial was concluded, Praman himself died of pneumonitis on 7 February 2007 at Ramathibodi Hospital. Praman had also battled with a heart disease since 1985.

His funeral was held at the royal temple Wat Thepsirinthrawat in Bangkok. King Bhumibol Adulyadej provided dignitarial items for his funeral, including corpse bathing water, an octagonal urn, five-coloured umbrellas, and a royal band to herald his death for three days from 8 to 10 February 2007. His cremation was held at the same temple on 3 June 2007 with flames granted by the king.

== Marriage ==
Praman married Amphansi Chansue (Thai: อำพันศรี ชันซื่อ), née Thangsuphanit (Thai: ทังสุพานิช). Amphansi was the eldest child of her family, which ran a business of importing products related to rice mills. She was Praman's childhood friend who lived near his house on Soi Nom Chit (Thai: ซอยน้อมจิต) in Bangkok before World War II broke out. After the war, they accidentally reunited when they found each other living on the same soi again, that is, Soi Si Nakhon (Thai: ซอยศรีนคร). The two developed their feelings into love and they were engaged before Praman travelled to the United States for studying at Yale University.

Praman and Amphansi married on 3 October 1961. The two had the following three children, respectively: two sons, Ekkathet Chansue (Thai: เอกเทศ ชันซื่อ) and Ekkaphot Chansue (Thai: เอกพจน์ ชันซื่อ), and a daughter, Parama Chansue (Thai: ปรมา ชันซื่อ).

== Honours ==
- Knight Grand Cordon of the Order of the White Elephant
- Knight Grand Cordon of the Order of the Crown of Thailand
- Chakrabarti Mala Medal
