= Lebua at State Tower =

Luxury hotel in Bangkok, Thailand

Coordinates: 13°43′16″N 100°31′03″E

lebua at State Tower
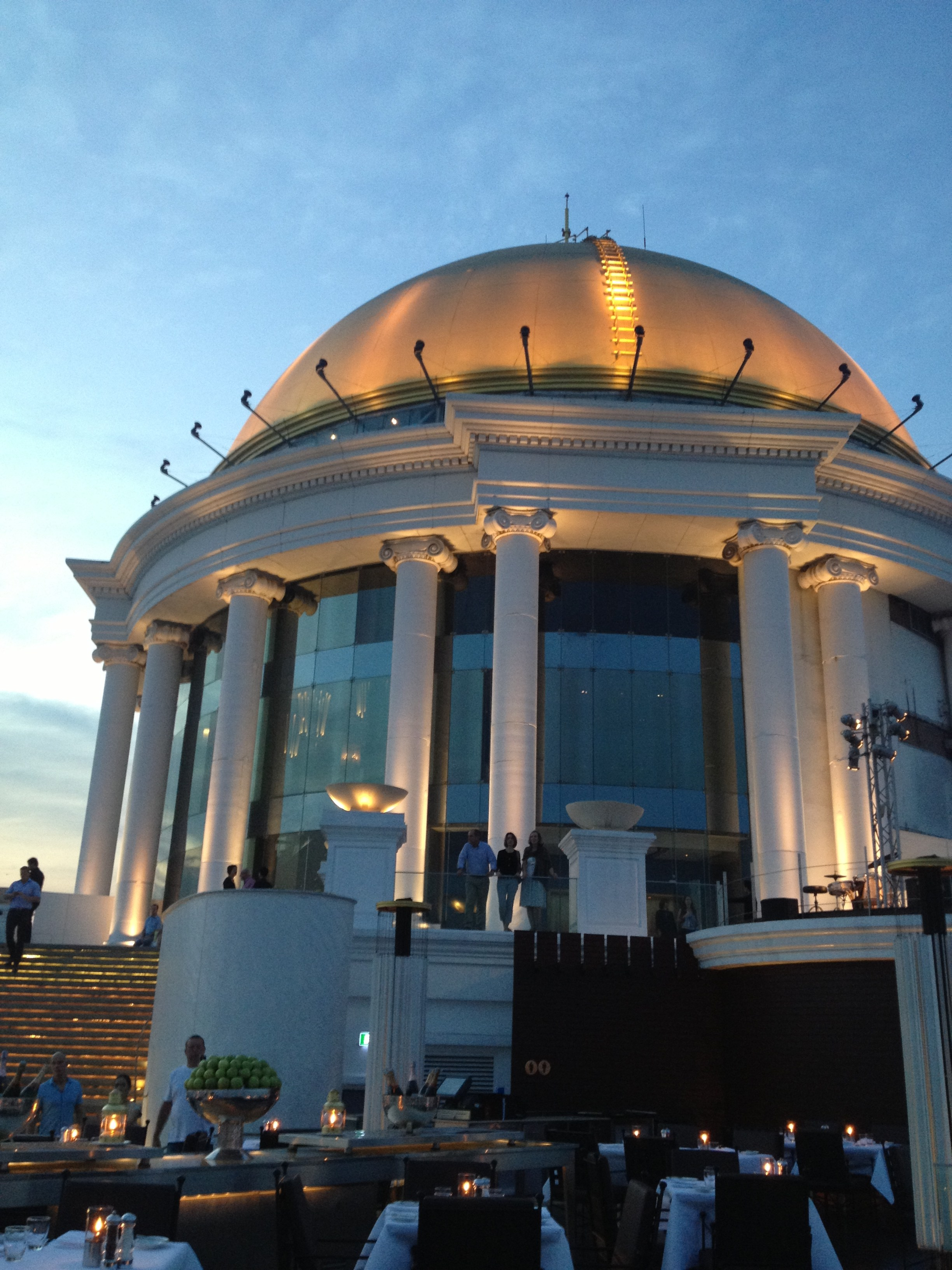
- The Dome at lebua (64th floor)

General information
- Location: 1055 Silom Road, Bangkok, Thailand
- Opening: 2006
- Operator: lebua Hotels & Resorts

Height
- Height: 247 m (810 ft)

Technical details
- Floor count: 5

Other information
- Number of suites: 137
- Number of restaurants: 4

Website
- lebua.com/state-tower

lebua Bangkok is a luxury hotel located in at State Tower adjacent to the Chao Phraya River on Silom Road in the Bang Rak District of Bangkok, Thailand. The hotel is managed by lebua Hotels & Resorts, a Thai hospitality company that operates hotels, restaurants, and bars in Thailand, India, and New Zealand. The hotel is known for its high-rise location, large suites, and its collection of restaurants and bars under The Dome by lebua, several of which have received international recognition and Michelin stars.

The brand is founded by its current President & CEO, Narawadee Bualert.

lebua State Tower's rooftop restaurant, Sirocco, hosts the highest New Year's Eve ball drop in the world. Since New Year's Eve 2015, Sirocco has hosted the highest ball drop in the world.

== Overview ==
The property comprises three main components:

- lebua at State Tower – Located on the lower floors, this section offers large suites with separate bedrooms, living areas, and balconies.
- Tower Club at lebua – Situated on the 53rd to 59th floors, it features suites with additional privileges and direct access to the hotel’s dining and bar venues.
- The Dome by lebua – A cluster of restaurants and bars at the top of the State Tower, introduced in the early 2000s and recognized as part of Bangkok’s dining and nightlife scene.

== Bars and restaurants ==
- The Dome by lebua is a cluster of restaurants and bars located at the top of the State Tower. Since its introduction in the early 2000s, it has become a prominent part of Bangkok’s dining and nightlife scene.
  - Sirocco – An outdoor Mediterranean restaurant on the 64th floor, recognized as one of the world’s highest alfresco restaurants. It is accompanied by a live jazz band and panoramic views of Bangkok.
  - Sky Bar – one of the world’s highest rooftop bars on 64th floor, known for its illuminated counter and panoramic views.
  - Distil is a cocktail bar located on the 64th floor, offering oysters, caviar, lobster, cigars and a collection of single malt whiskey.
  - Mezzaluna – A two-Michelin-star restaurant on 65th floor led by Chef Ryuki Kawasaki, offering French cuisine with Japanese influences. The restaurant has consistently held two Michelin stars since 2018.
  - Breeze – A Chinese restaurant on the 52nd floor, designed with a neon-lit sky bridge. It is known for modern interpretations of Chinese cuisine under Chef Sam Lee. Breeze was recognized by USA Today as one of the “Top 10 most cutting-edge restaurants” worldwide and won “Thailand’s Best Restaurant” at the World Culinary Awards in 2022.
  - Chef’s Table – Opened in 2019, this restaurant under Chef Vincent Thierry holds two Michelin stars and emphasizes contemporary French cuisine on 61st floor.
  - Alfresco 64 – The highest outdoor whisky bar in the world, launched in partnership with Chivas Regal, featuring a yacht-inspired interior design.
  - lebua No. 3 – A multi-level gin, caviar, and vodka bar featuring a spiral staircase design and advanced distillation techniques through the venue’s “lebua Laboratory”
  - Flûte by lebua, a Champagne Bollinger Bar – Opened in 2015, this venue is the world’s highest open-air Champagne bar, offering exclusive Bollinger cuvées and caviar service.
  - Pink Bar – Opened in 2019, Pink Bar is a boutique champagne lounge decorated in rose and blush tones, offering prestige cuvées and champagne cocktails
  - Café Mozu – Poolside restaurant serving an international buffet with a mix of Thai, Indian, Middle Eastern, and Western dishes. The venue is also known for its tandoor oven and Lebanese grill offerings. Positioned next to the outdoor swimming pool, Café Mozu provides both indoor and alfresco seating. In addition to its breakfast and lunch buffets, it offers à la carte dining throughout the day.

== Awards ==
=== lebua at State Tower ===
- Travel + Leisure World’s Best Awards 2025: Top 100 Favorite Hotels in the World (#72); Top 15 Favorite City Hotels in Asia (#14); Top 5 Favorite Hotels in Bangkok (#3).
- Condé Nast Traveler Readers' Choice Awards 2021: #4 Best Hotels in Bangkok.
- Travel + Leisure World’s Best Awards 2020: Top 5 Hotels in Bangkok (#2); Top 15 Asia City Hotels (#14).
- Departures (2020): “The World’s Best Hotel Views.”
- Travel + Leisure World’s Best Awards 2019: Top 5 Hotels in Bangkok (#1); Top 10 City Hotels in Asia (#5); Top 100 Hotels in the World (#90).
- Condé Nast Traveler Readers’ Choice Awards 2019: Top three hotels in Bangkok.
- Additional recognitions: World Travel Awards (2009), World Luxury Hotel Awards (2008, 2009), Expedia Best of +VIP (2016), Agoda Gold Circle (2015), Hotels.com Loved by Guests (2015–16), TripAdvisor Certificate of Excellence (2014).

=== Tower Club at lebua ===
- World Travel Awards 2024: Asia’s Leading Luxury All Suite Hotel; Thailand's Leading Lifestyle Hotel.
- World Travel Awards 2023: World’s Leading Luxury Suites Hotel; Asia’s Leading Luxury All Suite Hotel; Thailand's Leading Lifestyle Hotel.
- World Travel Awards 2022: World’s Leading Luxury Suites Hotel; Asia’s Leading Luxury All Suites Hotel; Thailand's Leading Hotel Suite; Thailand's Leading Lifestyle Hotel.
- World Travel Awards 2021: World’s Leading Luxury Suites Hotel; Asia’s Leading Luxury All Suite Hotel; Thailand’s Leading Hotel Suite; Thailand’s Leading Lifestyle Hotel.
- World Travel Awards 2020: Asia’s Leading Luxury All Suite Hotel; Thailand’s Leading Hotel Suite; Thailand’s Leading Lifestyle Hotel.

=== Sirocco ===
- Top Italian Restaurants 2025 by Gambero Rosso: 2 Forks.
- World Culinary Awards 2024: World’s Best Rooftop Restauran t; Asia’s Best Rooftop Restaurant.
- World Culinary Awards 2023: World’s Best Rooftop Restaurant; Asia’s Best Rooftop Restaurant.
- World Travel Awards 2020: Asia’s Leading Hotel Rooftop Restaurant & Bar.
- Thailand Tatler – Thailand’s Best Restaurants: multiple years (2011, 2013–2018).
- The Telegraph (UK) 2013: “World’s Most Expensive Desserts” feature.
- Hospitality Asia Platinum Awards 2011–2013: Restaurant of the Year; Most Cosmopolitan Bar & Restaurant.
- Earlier recognitions: American Express “My Favorite International Restaurant” (2006–07); Condé Nast Traveler US “Hot Nights & Hot Tables” (2005).

=== Mezzaluna ===
- Tatler Thailand 2025: Best 20 Restaurants.
- MICHELIN Guide Thailand: Two Michelin Stars (2017–2025, consecutive).
- World Culinary Awards 2024: World’s Best Restaurant; Asia’s Best Restaurant; Asia’s Best Fine Dining Hotel Restaurant; Thailand’s Best Restaurant.
- World Culinary Awards 2023: World’s Best Fine Dining Hotel Restaurant; Asia’s Best Fine Dining Hotel Restaurant; Thailand’s Best Restaurant.
- Koktail Magazine: Thailand’s Best Restaurants (2022–25), Restaurant of the Year (2025).
- Thailand Tatler – Best Restaurants Guide: #1 in 2019; #2 in 2018; Five Mango rating in 2016.
- La Liste: ranked in 2017 and 2018.
- Additional awards: Seven Star Global Luxury Award (2013–14), Hospitality Asia Platinum Awards (2011–13).

=== Chef’s Table ===
- Tatler Thailand 2025: Best Service; Best 20 Restaurants.
- Wine Spectator’s Best of Award of Excellence 2025.
- MICHELIN Guide Thailand: Two Michelin Stars (2020–2025); One Michelin Star (2019).
- MICHELIN Guide Thailand: Service Award (2021, 2024).
- World Culinary Awards 2024: Asia’s Best Landmark Restaurant; Thailand’s Best Hotel Restaurant.
- World Culinary Awards 2023: Asia’s Best Landmark Restaurant; Thailand’s Best Hotel Restaurant.
- Koktail Magazine: Thailand’s Best Restaurants (2022–25), Sommelier of the Year (2025).
- Departures Legend Awards 2019: “The Best Meal We’ve Had This Year.”

=== Breeze ===
- World Culinary Awards 2022: Thailand's Best Restaurant.
- La Liste 2017.
- Thailand Tatler – Thailand’s Best Restaurants: multiple years (2011, 2012, 2013, 2014).
- USA Today 2014: “Top 10 Most Cutting-Edge Restaurants in the World.”
- Hospitality Asia Platinum Awards 2011–2013: Restaurant of the Year (Platinum Winner); Most Authentic Asian Cuisine Restaurant.
- Condé Nast Traveler US 2007: “Hot Tables.”
- Art of Travel Guide (2007, Netherlands): Best New Seafood Al Fresco Restaurant in Asia.

== In popular culture ==
The hotel, Sirocco, Sky Bar, Tower Club and the State Tower were sites of several key scenes in the 2011 film The Hangover Part II.

The hotel features a three-bedroom "Hangover" suite where the cast of the film created havoc. Sky Bar created the "Hangovertini", a cocktail to commemorate the film. The cocktail was first served to director Todd Phillips.

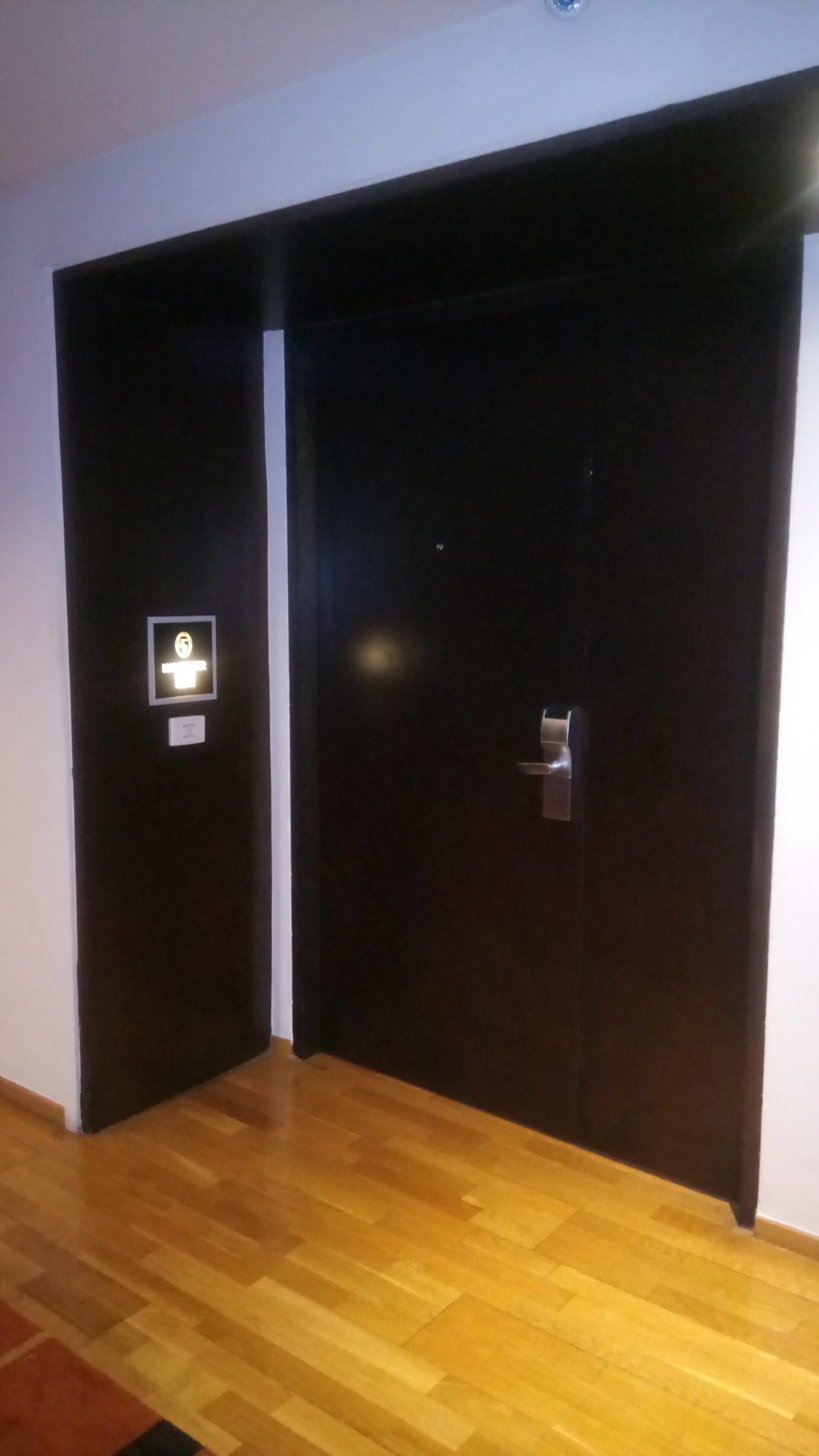
Hangover II suite, where filming took place
