= Grand Hyatt Erawan Bangkok =

Luxury hotel in Bangkok, Thailand

Coordinates: 13°44′36″N 100°32′26″E

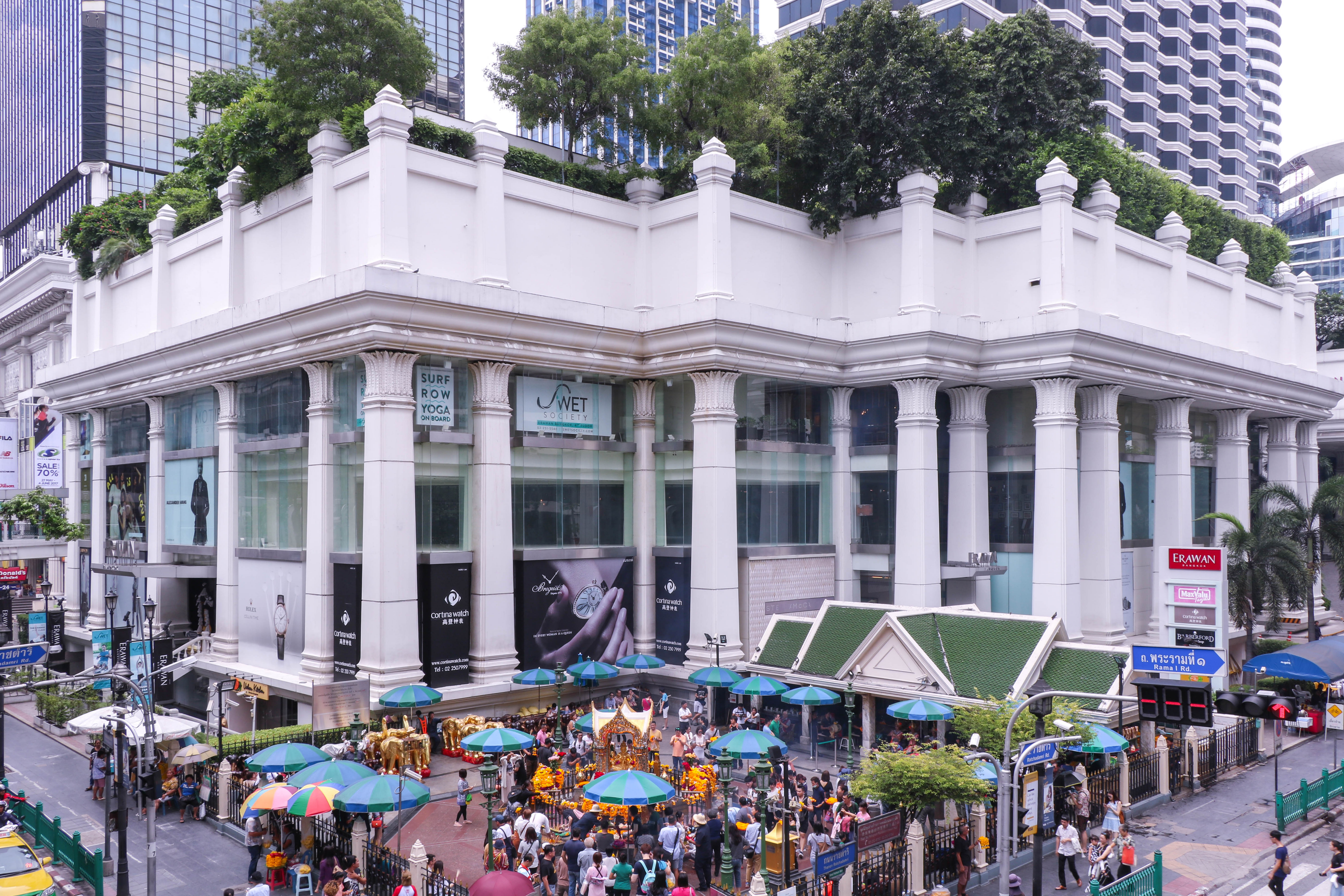
- The northern end of the hotel building (which houses its shopping mall), with the Erawan Shrine in front
- Interactive map of the Grand Hyatt Erawan Bangkok area
- Hotel chain: Hyatt Hotels

General information
- Type: Hotel
- Location: 494 Ratchadamri Rd, Lumphini, Pathum Wan, Bangkok 10330, Thailand
- Opening: 1991; 35 years ago
- Owner: The Erawan Group, The Syndicate of Thai Hotels and Tourists Enterprises

Technical details
- Floor count: 22

Other information
- Number of rooms: 380
- Number of restaurants: 9 (incl. bars)

Website
- www.hyatt.com/en-US/hotel/thailand/grand-hyatt-erawan-bangkok/bangh

The Grand Hyatt Erawan Bangkok is a luxury hotel in Bangkok, Thailand. It opened in 1991, replacing the ailing government-owned Erawan Hotel, on a corner of Ratchaprasong Intersection in the modern city centre. It is jointly owned by Thai hospitality company the Erawan Group and the government-owned company The Syndicate of Thai Hotels and Tourists Enterprises, which previously operated the Erawan, and is managed by Hyatt Hotels and Resorts. The hotel building was designed by Rangsan Torsuwan in a postmodern style employing traditional Thai elements, and features a shopping mall inside the building, known as Erawan Bangkok. The property is adjacent to the popular Erawan Shrine, which was built to alleviate bad luck during the construction of the original hotel.

== History ==
The Grand Hyatt Erawan replaced the government-owned Erawan Hotel, which had been established on the southeast corner of Ratchaprasong Intersection in 1956. One of Bangkok's top luxury hotels in the 1960s, by the 1980s the Erawan was unable to keep up with competition from private enterprises, and The Syndicate of Thai Hotels and Tourists Enterprises, the state-owned company that operated the Erawan, decided to demolish the hotel and have it rebuilt in a private joint venture.

After a couple of years of negotiation, the project was awarded to the Amarin Plaza Company (now known as The Erawan Group), which had just opened the Amarin Plaza shopping mall next to the hotel in 1985. The development contract, signed in 1987, entailed the establishment of the Erawan Hotel Company, with Amarin owning two thirds of shares and the Syndicate owning the remaining, and a thirty-year lease agreement for the land. Architect Rangsan Torsuwan, who had designed Amarin Plaza, was brought onto the project early on, and he and company CEO Isara Vongkusolkit met many times with officials of the Prem Tinsulanonda government during the designing of the project. Rangsan oversaw most aspects of the project's design, including its drafting, designing, cash flow, and marketing.

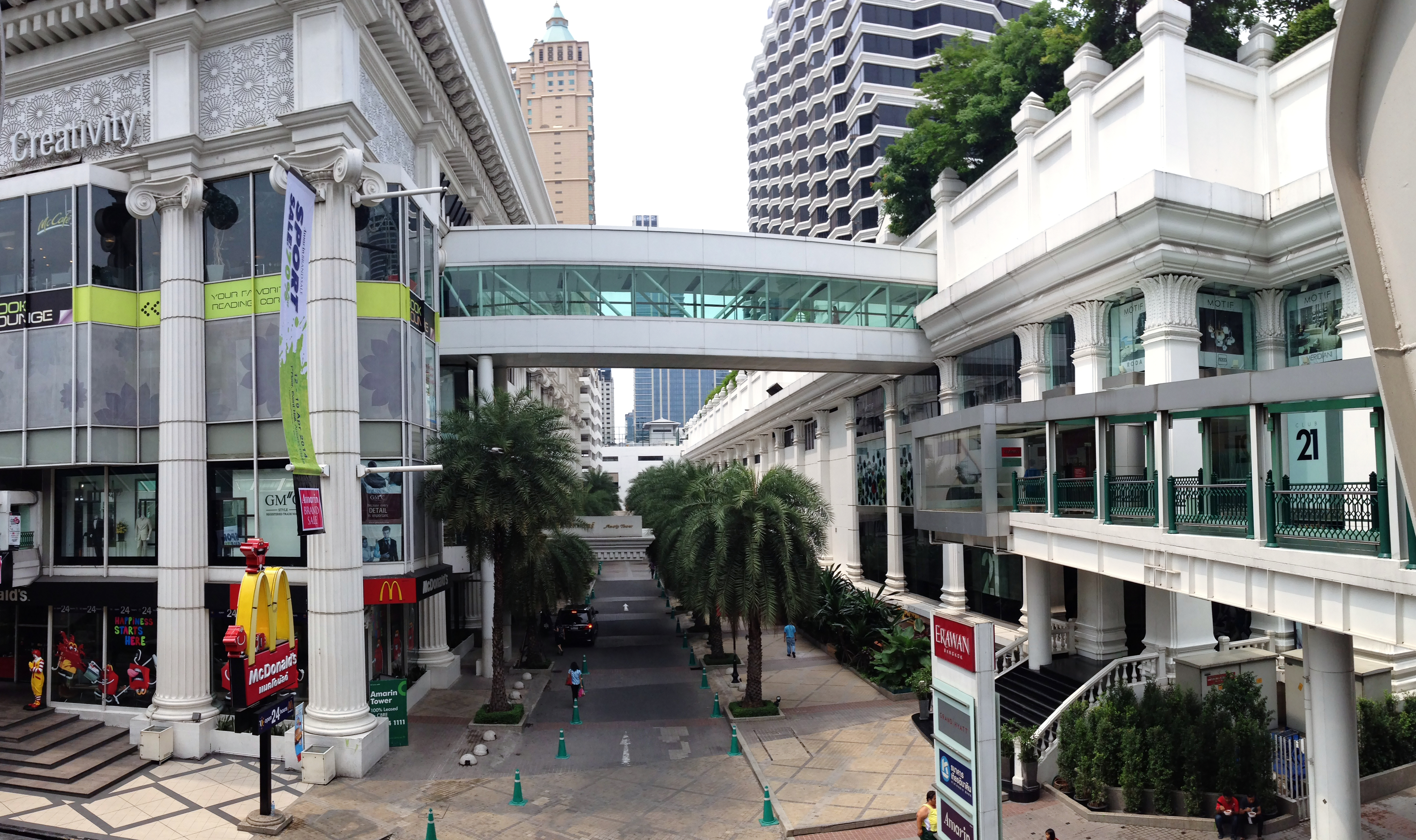
Rangsan Torsuwan employed Greco-Roman decorative elements in his design for Amarin Plaza (left), and used Thai-style columns for the Grand Hyatt Erawan (right).

Rangsan's design for Amarin Plaza had involved the combination of Greco-Roman columns with a glass-walled office tower, a postmodern style popular with tenants but heavily criticized by fellow architects. For the new hotel, the government wanted a design that featured Thai elements, and Rangsan presented one that incorporated traditional Thai features found in palaces and Buddhist temples. His original proposal, following a method described as Thai Mannerist, was attacked as a disrespectful appropriation of sacred forms, and Rangsan acquiesced to the project owners' requests to cut several components. The result was a similar postmodern design to that of Amarin Plaza, but with the Western-historicism inspiration replaced by traditionalist Thai elements, most visibly gigantic square columns with indented corners and capitals in the style of temple architecture. It also saw similar threads of criticism upon its completion.

The Amarin Plaza Company was taken public in 1988 to raise capital for the project. As this was its first venture into the hotel business, the company opted to position it as a five-star hotel in order to establish a foothold in the industry. It reached a deal with Hyatt Hotels and Resorts, which would manage the hotel under the Grand Hyatt brand as the Grand Hyatt Erawan. Construction began in 1988, and the hotel opened in late 1991.

The hotel has undergone several renovations, including the addition of spa rooms in 2005 and a major renovation of all its guest rooms in 2012, as well as additions to its meeting and event facilities. Most of the additions were designed by New York-based Tony Chi.

== Operations ==
The Grand Hyatt Erawan is owned by the Erawan Hotel Company, which, as of 2010, is 73.6 percent owned by The Erawan Group and 26.4 percent by The Syndicate of Thai Hotels and Tourists Enterprises. The hotel, which is managed by Hyatt, survived the 1997 Asian financial crisis thanks to its being able to quote prices in dollars, helping it avoid losses due to the fall in value of the baht. By 2015, the Grand Hyatt Erawan accounted for 25 percent of The Erawan Group's revenue. The hotel was negatively affected by the bombing at the nearby Erawan Shrine in 2015, but especially suffered from the COVID-19 pandemic in 2020–2021, as its business segment relied over 80 percent on international guests. Other high-profile incidents that occurred at the hotel include a suspected murder-suicide by cyanide poisoning in July 2024.

== Facilities ==
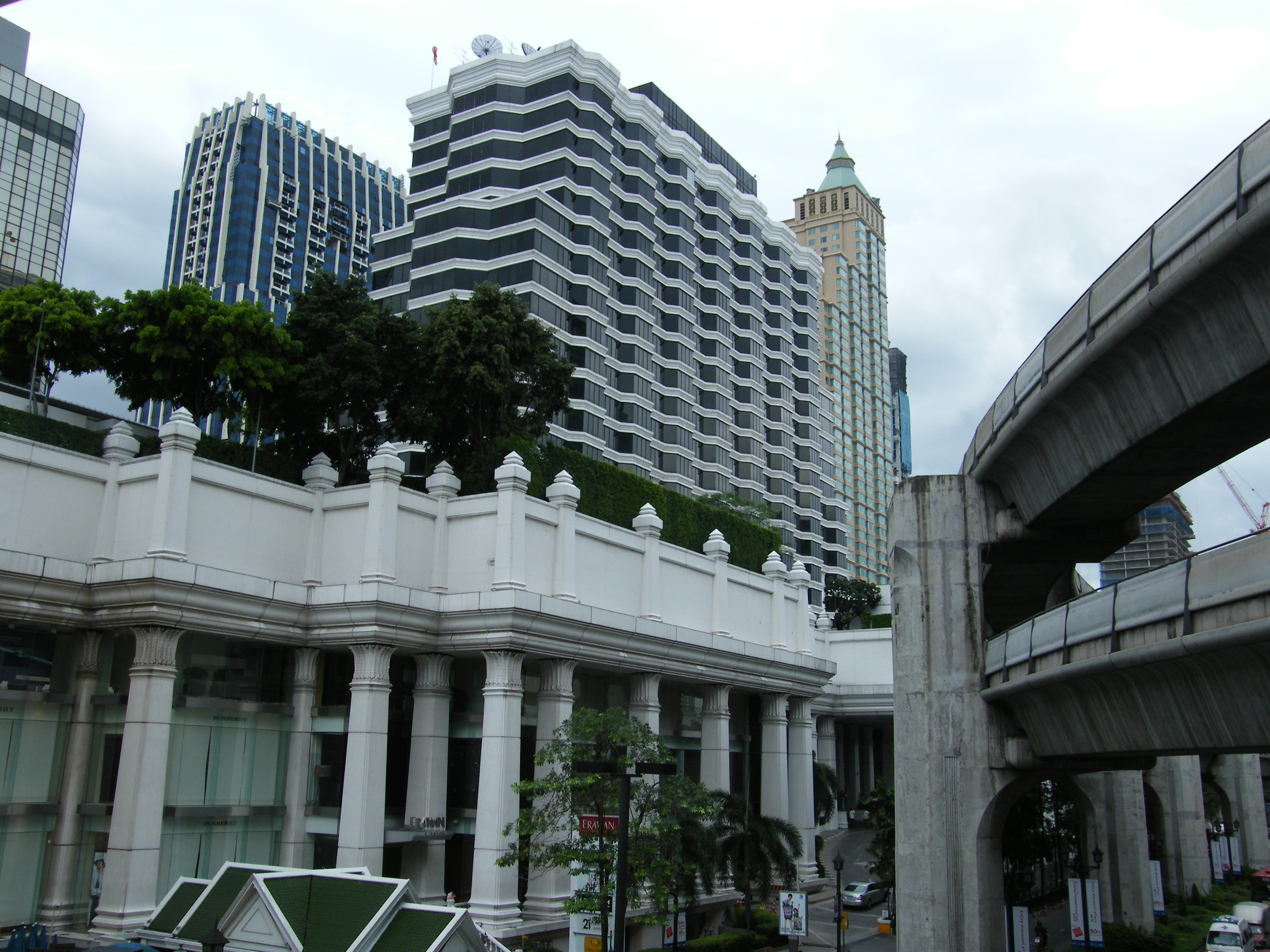
The 22-storey hotel building rises above the podium

The Grand Hyatt Erawan has 380 guest rooms, most of which are located in the 22-storey tower. Six rooms are resort-style "spa cottages" located on the deck of the five-storey podium, which is also the site of the hotel's I.Sawan Residential Spa & Club and swimming pool. The hotel features nine restaurants and bars, including the Erawan Tea Room, as well as several MICE facilities, including the 1,500-capacity Grand Ballroom and "The Residence" and "The Campus" themed meeting and event spaces. Its lobby occupies a vast atrium with towering columns that dominate the building's interior as well as exterior, and is decorated with artworks by prominent contemporary Thai artists.

A review by Fodor's gives the opinion, "This sophisticated hotel provides the best in service, quality, and amenities, and rightfully so for the price... the Grand Hyatt truly has something for everyone." A recommendation in New York magazine called the spa cottages "Bangkok's best-kept secret for the modern posh set".

The north end of the hotel building, (towards the intersection) is dedicated to a shopping mall, named the Erawan Bangkok and opened in 2005. It is positioned as a "boutique mall", with a compact floor area of 13,000 square metres (140,000 sq ft). It replaced the Sogo Department Store, which previously featured shopping spaces in the hotel as well as Amarin Plaza. The mall and hotel are connected via skywalk to the BTS Skytrain's Chit Lom Station, as well as several other malls and establishments in the Ratchaprasong area.

Adjacent to the hotel grounds, on the corner of Ratchaprasong Intersection, is the Erawan Shrine. Dedicated to the Hindu god Brahma, known in Thai representation as Phra Phrom, the shrine was built along with the original Erawan Hotel to ward off the bad fortune that had been plaguing its construction. The shrine became a famous spiritual landmark, popular among wish-makers, and was retained when the original hotel was demolished.
