= Airavat =

Airavat may refer to:

- Airavata, the mythical elephant king and the mount of Indra in Hinduism
- INS Airavat (L24), a Landing Ship Tank of the Indian Navy
- The code name for the Airborne Surveillance Platform, a prototype/experimental Indian early warning aircraft design

== See also ==
- Erawan (disambiguation), alternate transcription
- Iravati, the mythical mother of the elephant
