= Sawat Chotipanich =

Thai judge (1931–2025)

- สวัสดิ์ โชติพานิช

President of the Supreme Court of Thailand
- In office 1 October 1991 – 30 September 1992
- Preceded by: Sophon Ratanakorn
- Succeeded by: Praman Chansue

Personal details
- Born: 17 October 1931 Khuan Khanun district, Siam
- Died: 17 August 2025 (aged 93) Pak Kret district, Thailand
- Education: Thammasat University (LLB); National Defence College of Thailand
- Occupation: Judge

Sawat Chotipanich (Thai: สวัสดิ์ โชติพานิช; 17 October 1931 – 17 August 2025) was a Thai judge. He served as president of the Supreme Court from 1991 to 1992.

Chotipanich died in Pak Kret district on 17 August 2025, at the age of 93.
