= 2024 Bangkok hotel cyanide poisoning =

2024 suspected mass murder event in Thailand

- Location: Grand Hyatt Erawan Hotel, Bangkok, Thailand
- Date: 16 July 2024
- Attack type: Poisoning mass murder murder-suicide
- Weapon: Cyanide
- Deaths: 6 (Including the perpetrator)
- Perpetrator: Sherine Chong
- Motive: Financial dispute

On 16 July 2024, six people of Vietnamese descent, at the Grand Hyatt Erawan Hotel in Bangkok, Thailand, died of cyanide poisoning.

According to Thai Prime Minister Srettha Thavisin, two of the dead were US citizens of Vietnamese descent and four were Vietnamese nationals. After preliminary examinations of the scene, Major-General Theeradej Thumsuthee, chief investigator of the Metropolitan Police Bureau, also said that it was assumed that they had been poisoned, and that there were signs that all six drank coffee or tea. However, a preliminary autopsy did not find any injuries.

As of 17 July 2024, it was confirmed by Bangkok officials that all six victims died of cyanide poisoning. The police believed that it was a murder–suicide.

It was later revealed Sherine Chong, one of the US citizens, had poisoned the whole group. When the group had ordered food and tea she had refused the attendants offer to brew the tea and said she would do it herself.
