= Erawan Shrine =

Shrine in Bangkok, Thailand

- ศาลท้าวมหาพรหม
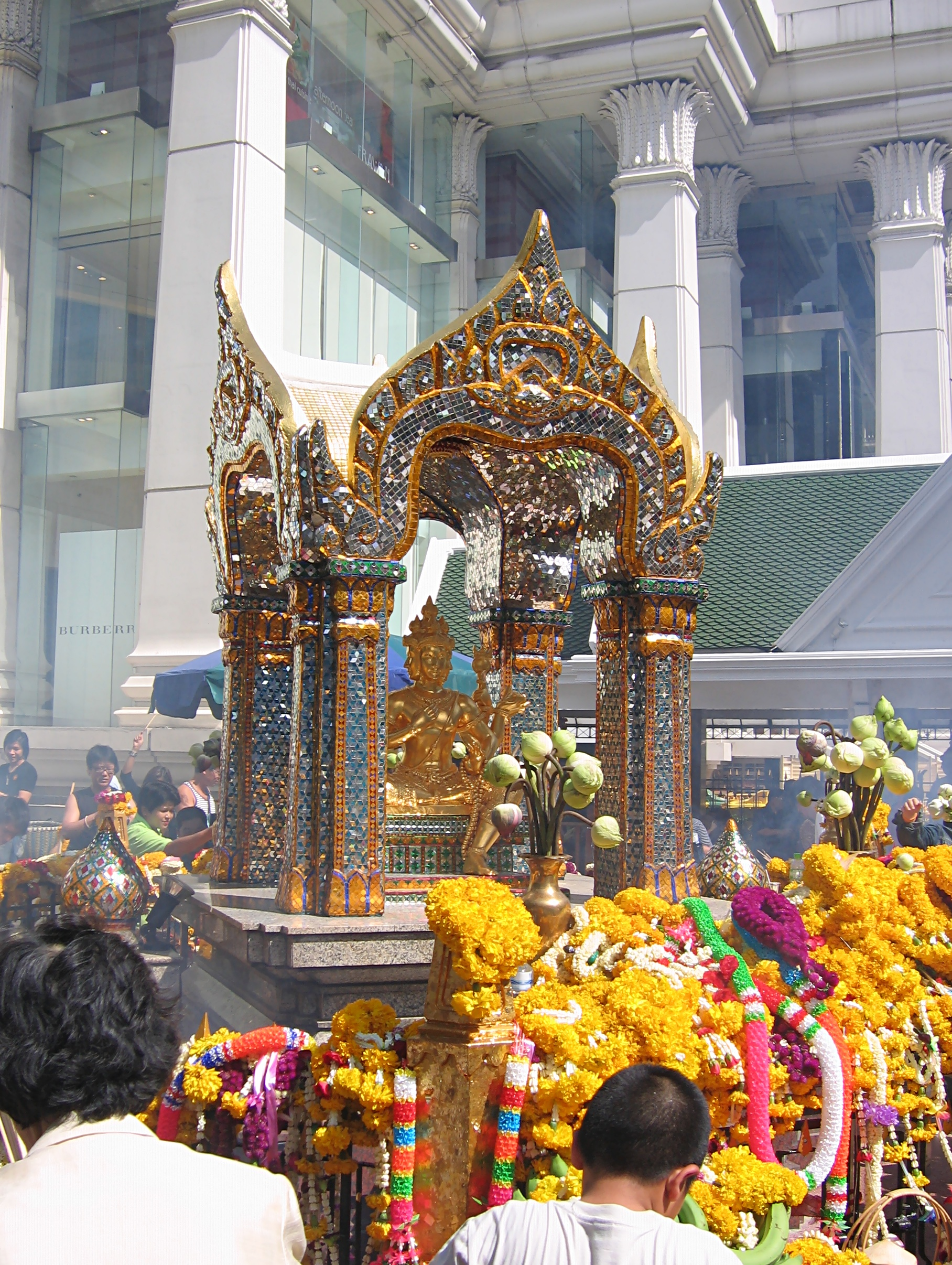

- Location within Thailand

Religion
- Affiliation: Hinduism, Buddhism
- District: Pathum Wan
- Province: Bangkok
- Deity: Phra Phrom
- Year consecrated: 1956; 2006 (current statue)

Location
- Location: Grand Hyatt Erawan, Ratchaprasong
- Country: Thailand
- Coordinates: 13.44397°N 100.32256°E

Architecture
- Completed: 1956

The Erawan Shrine, formally the Thao Maha Phrom Shrine (Thai: ศาลท้าวมหาพรหม, romanized: San Thao Maha Phrom, lit. 'shrine of Lord Maha Brahma'), is a shrine in Bangkok, Thailand, which houses a statue of Phra Phrom, the Thai representation of Brahma, the Hindu god of creation. The name also refers to Mahabrahma, the ruler of the Brahma realm in Buddhist cosmology.

The deity is popularly worshipped outside of a Hindu religious context, but more as a representation of guardian spirits in Thai animist beliefs, nevertheless the shrine shows an example of syncretism between Hinduism and Buddhism. The shrine often features performances by Thai dance troupes who are hired by worshippers in return for seeing their prayers answered at the shrine.

== Location ==
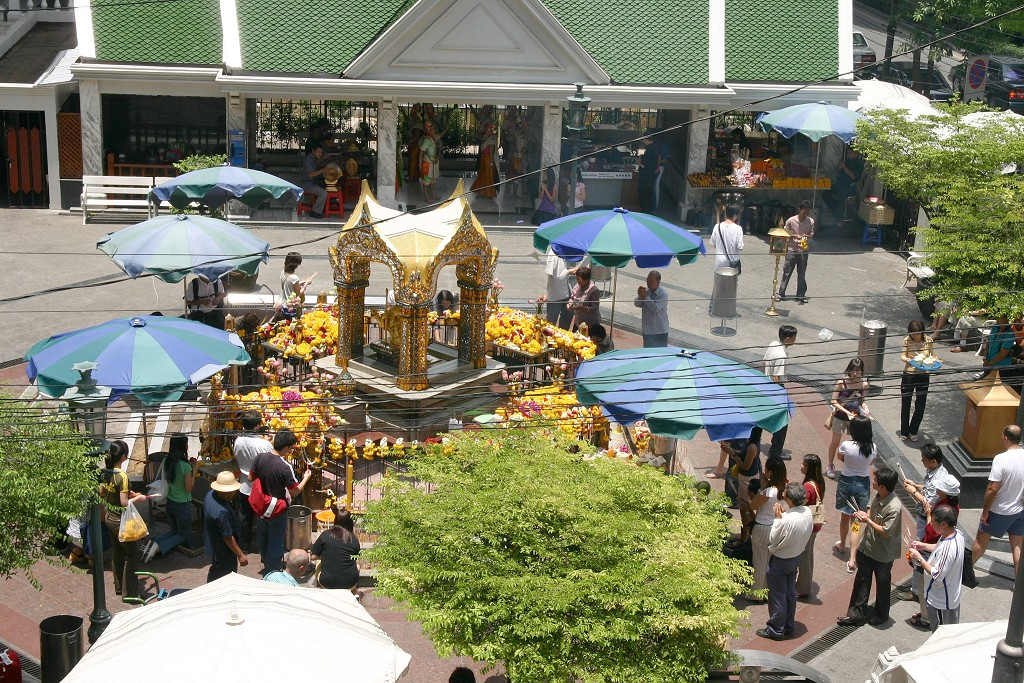
View of the shrine from the Skytrain

The shrine is near the Grand Hyatt Erawan Bangkok, at the Ratchaprasong intersection of Ratchadamri Road in Lumphini Subdistrict, Pathum Wan District. It is near the BTS Skytrain's Chit Lom Station, which has an elevated walkway overlooking the shrine. The area has many shopping malls nearby, including Gaysorn, CentralWorld, and Amarin Plaza.

Five other shrines dedicated to Hindu deities are located in the area as well: Phra Laksami (Lakshmi), Phra Trimurati (Trimurti), Phra Khanet (Ganesha), Phra In (Indra), and Phra Narai Song Suban (Narayana on his garuda).

== History ==
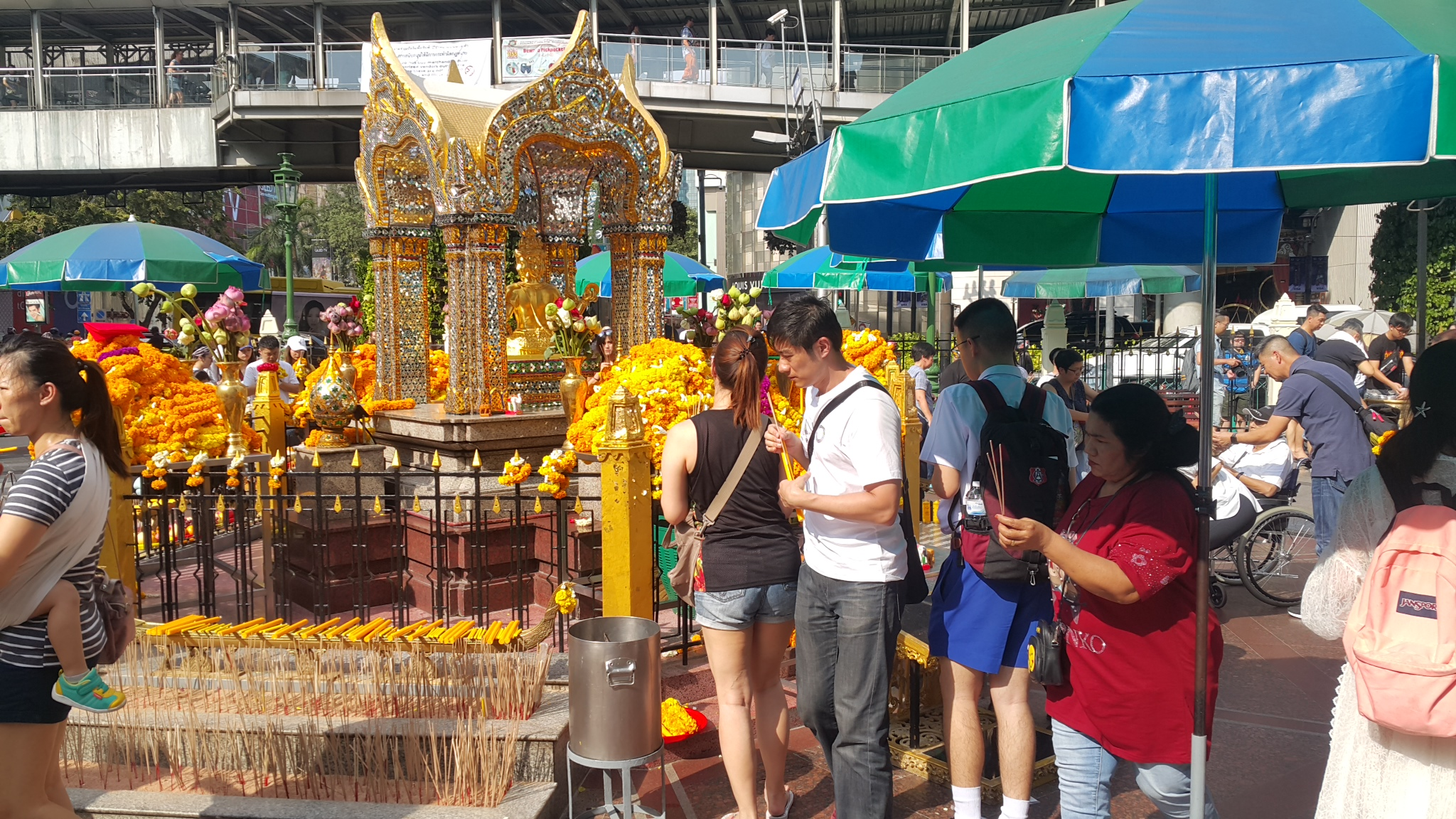
People praying at Erawan Shrine Bangkok (2018)

The Erawan Shrine was built in 1956 as part of the government-owned Erawan Hotel to eliminate the bad karma which was believed to have been caused by laying the foundation on the wrong date.

The hotel's construction was delayed by a series of mishaps, including cost overruns, injuries to laborers, and the loss of a shipload of Italian marble intended for the building. Furthermore, the Ratchaprasong intersection had once been used to put criminals on public display.

An astrologer advised building the shrine to counter the negative influences. The Brahma statue was designed and built by the Fine Arts Department and enshrined on 9 November 1956. The hotel's construction thereafter proceeded without further incident. In 1987, the hotel was demolished and the site used for the Grand Hyatt Erawan Bangkok Hotel.

Notably, the Erawan Brahma was cast and ritually consecrated in the same period and ceremonial context as the Brahma image installed at the rooftop shrine of Thai Khu Fa Building, the main building of Government House.

=== 2006 vandalism ===
In the early hours of 21 March 2006, a young man named Thanakorn Pakdeepol destroyed the statue with a large hammer. He was then beaten to death by angry bystanders. Two street sweepers were arrested and charged with the murder. Witnesses said Thanakorn stood on the base of the statue and smashed the hollow statue of Brahma to pieces, fragmenting the four-faced head, torso, six arms, and weapons. Only part of the lap and the base of the statue remained intact.

An autopsy performed on Thanakorn found Arabic characters tattooed on his back and arms, prompting the police to investigate if the attack had been religious and if the vandal had any ties to Muslim extremists. However, Thanakorn's father, Sayant Pakdeepol, explained that his son had received treatment for psychiatric problems and that mental illness was the cause of the attack. Sayant condemned the fatal beating of his son as an "overreaction". "Doing something like this is not the act of people with good beliefs, of those with real faith in Brahma", Sayant told The Nation newspaper. "Murder is an immoral act and people with morality would not have done what they did".

Just days after the destruction of the Erawan Shrine, then Thai Prime Minister Thaksin Shinawatra visited the site and paid his respects to the fragments of the Hindu deity. A white cloth was placed over the shrine to conceal the statue's absence. Officials reopened the site to the public, displaying photographs of the statue for worshippers to pay their respects. At a rally the following day, government critic Sondhi Limthongkul claimed the destruction of the statue was an attempt by the Prime Minister to maintain his political power through black magic. However, Thanakorn's father rejected this, telling The Nation that Sondhi Limthongkul "is the biggest liar I have ever seen."

An identical statue of Brahma was placed in the shrine on 21 May 2006 at 11:39, at the instant the sun was directly overhead. Officials from the Department of Religious Affairs and the Maha Brahma Foundation said the new statue was made of plaster with a mixture of gold, bronze, and other precious metals, along with some fragments of the original. A duplicate statue made entirely of metal had also been cast in the same mold and is kept for safety in the National Museum of Thailand.

=== 2015 bombing ===
On 17 August 2015, at 18:55 local time, an explosive device composed of three kilograms of TNT stuffed in a metal pipe and wrapped in white cloth inside a backpack was detonated near the Erawan Shrine, killing 20 bystanders and injuring 125. Bomb disposal units checked two other suspicious objects but found no more bombs. An analyst with IHS Jane's suggested the attack had been carried out by the Pan-Turkic Turkish ultra-nationalist organization Grey Wolves in retaliation for the Thai government's deporting Uyghur terrorist suspects to China, instead of allowing them to accept asylum offered to them by Turkey.

The bomb had been placed in the shrine grounds next to a metal railing. The statue itself was slightly damaged. Within two days all repairs had been completed and the shrine reopened. However, the government's swift reopening of the shrine has been subject to criticism. The government's apparent lack of progress in the investigation stimulated critics to propose a number of theories about the bombing, including blaming elements of the government itself.

=== 2020 ban on incense and candles ===
Beginning March 2020, incense and candles were no longer allowed to be lit at the shrine, due to health and environmental concerns.

== Gallery ==
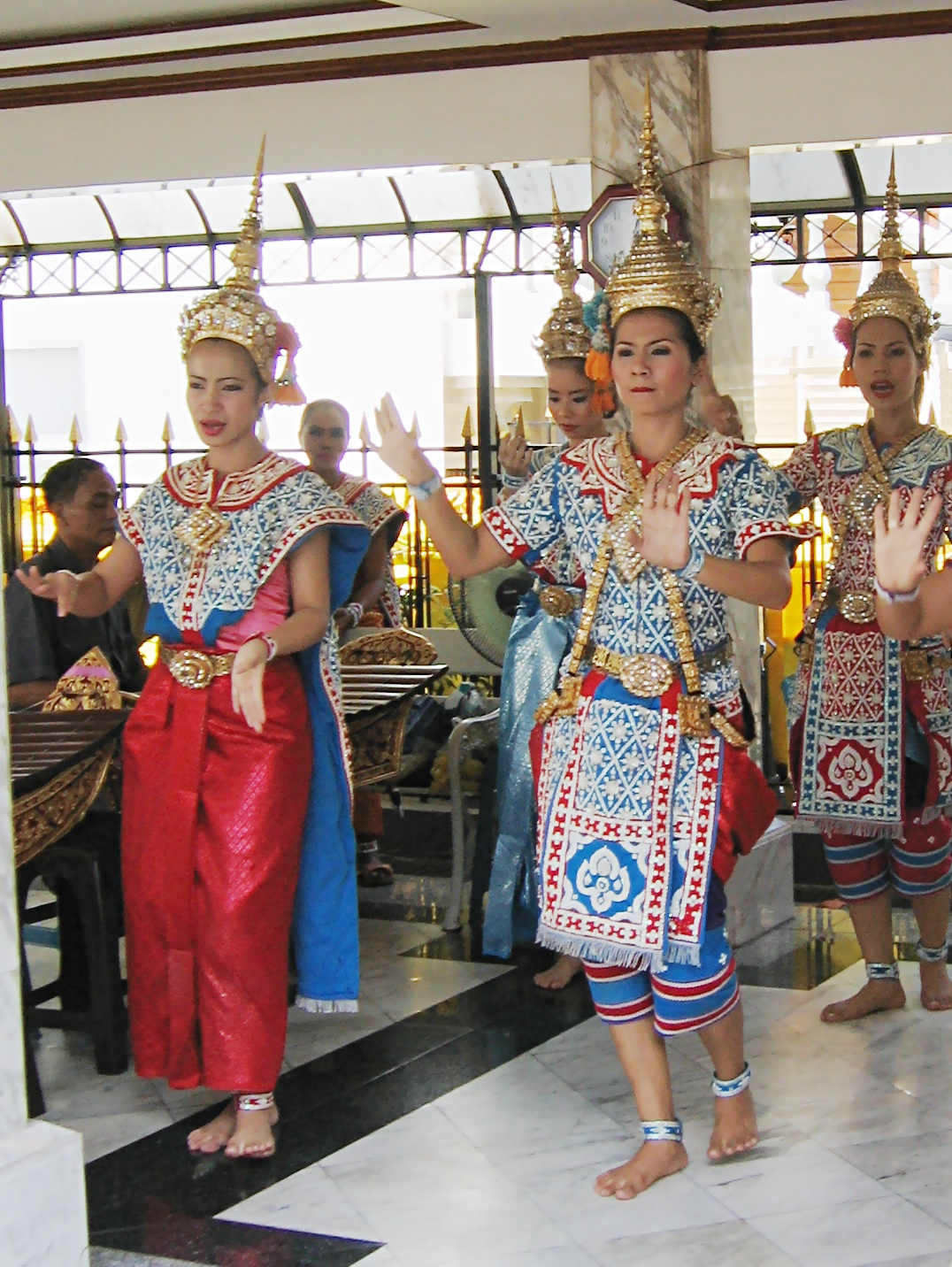
The Thai dance troupe performs.

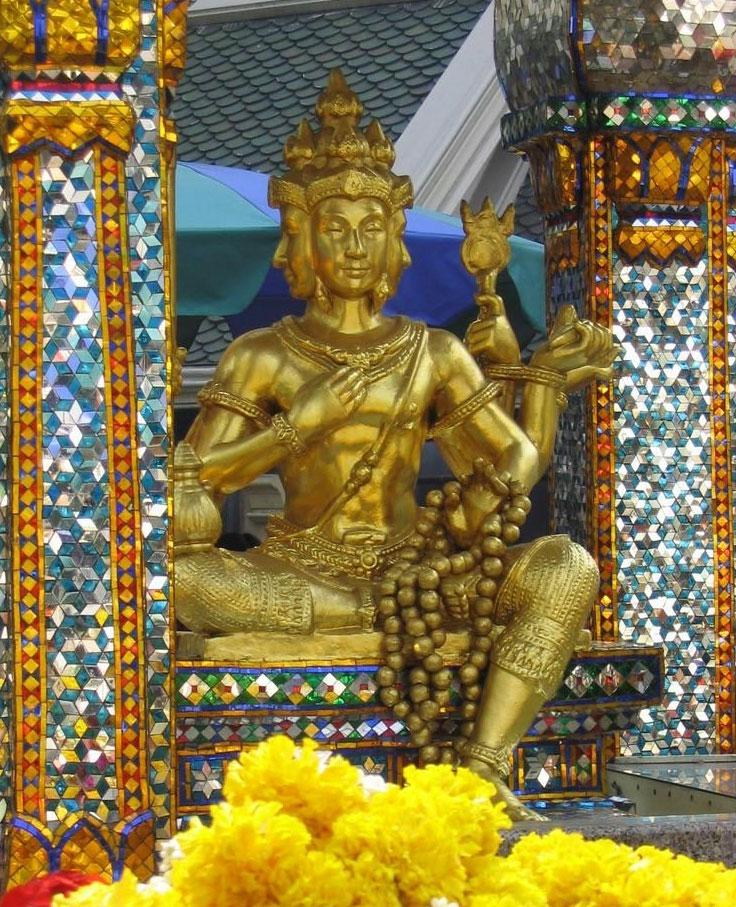
Closer view of the four-faced Brahma (Phra Phrom) statue

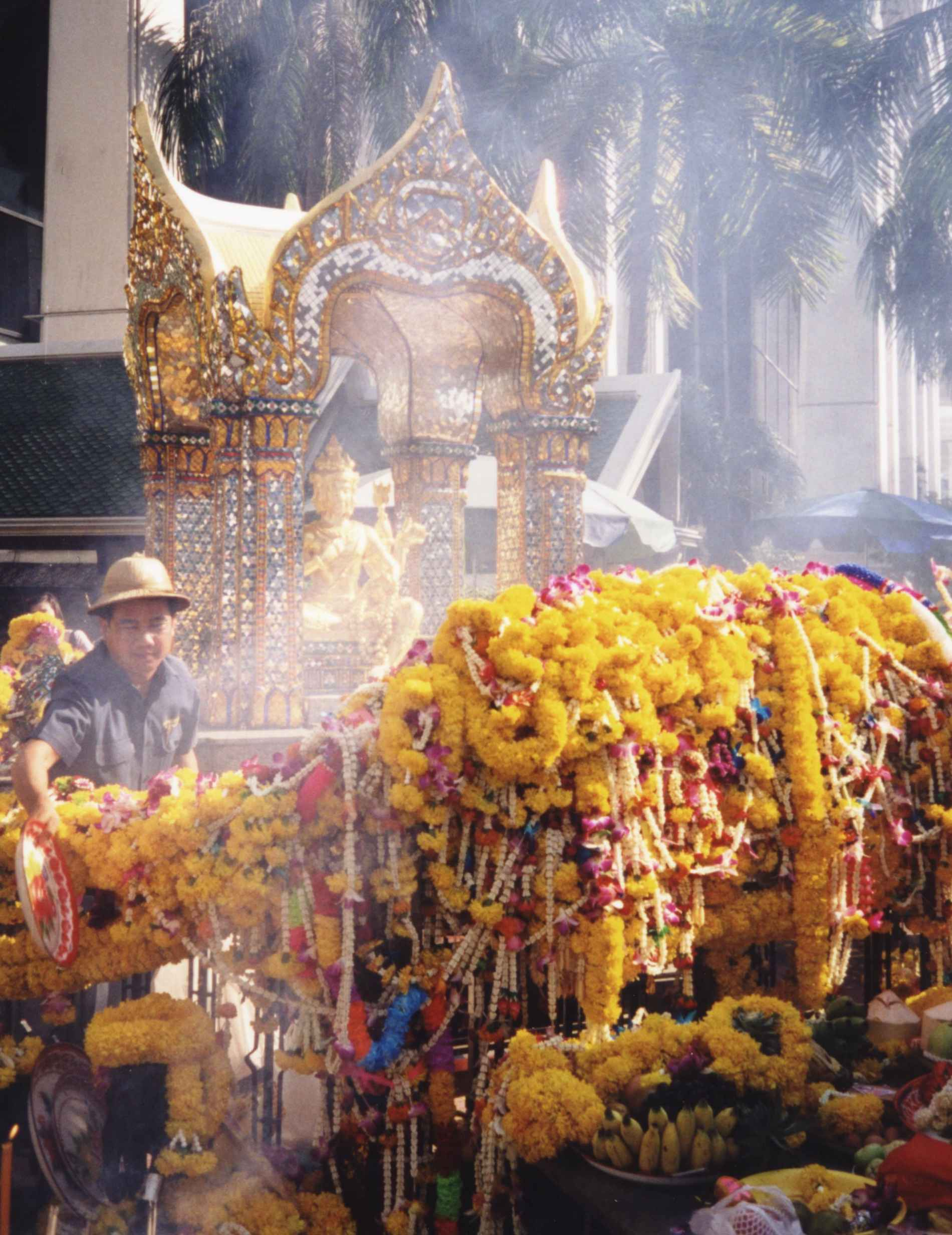
Flowers and incense around the shrine.

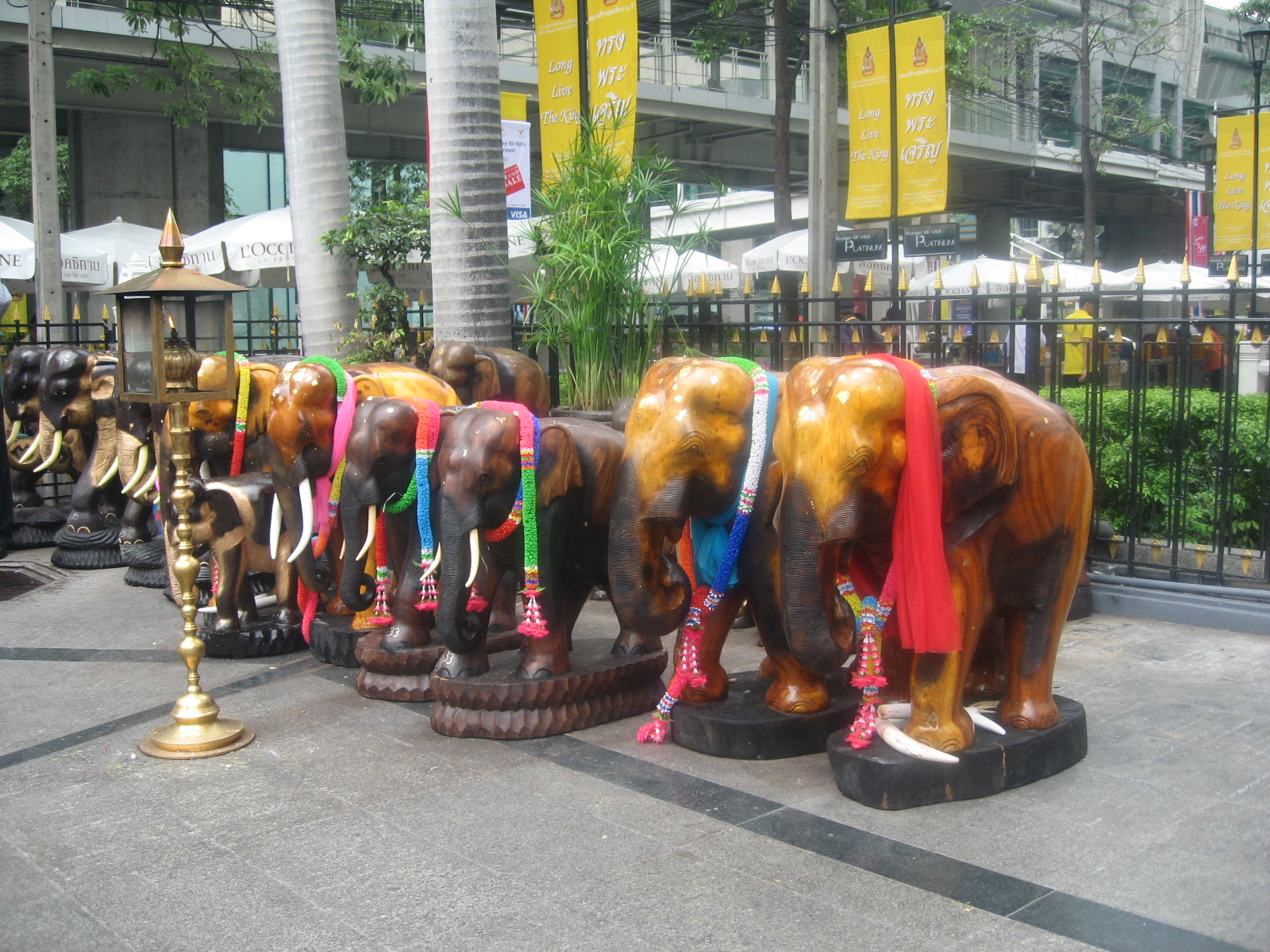
Statues of elephants

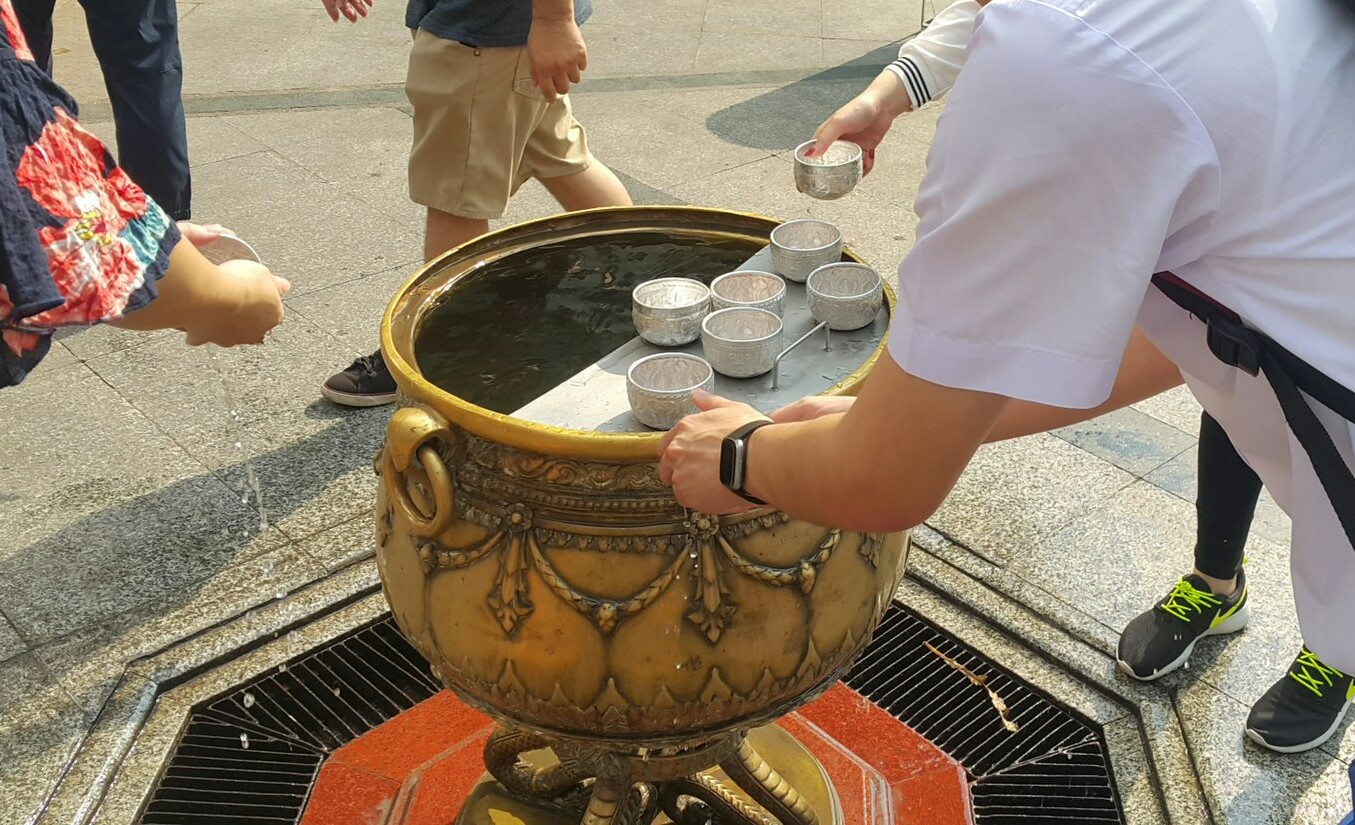
A Thai student pouring the holy water on his two hands at Erawan shrine

== See also ==
- Hinduism in Thailand
- Devasathan, the main Hindu temple in Bangkok
- Spirit house, the general practice of establishing shrines to appease local spirits
