= Mitr Phol Group =

Suger company

- Industry: Food processing Bioenergy
- Founded: 1946; 80 years ago
- Headquarters: Khlong Toei, Bangkok, Thailand
- Area served: Thailand; China; Laos
- Key people: Isara Vongkusolkit, President
- Products: Sugar
- Revenue: 90 billion baht (2018)
- Subsidiaries: Petro Green Co. Ltd; Bio-Energy Co. Ltd.
- Website: www.mitrphol.com

Mitr Phol Group is Thailand's and Asia's biggest sugar and bio-energy producer.

Mitr Phol Sugar Corp is a privately owned group of companies, mainly owned by the Vongkusolkit family. As of 2014, Mitr Phol is ranked as the world's fifth largest sugar producer, and the largest producer in Asia. It is Thailand's largest sugar producer and the second largest in China through its joint venture company East Asia Sugar. In addition to Thailand and China, Mitr Phol has operations and investments in Lao PDR and most recently Australia. Its key business units include sugar, wood substitute materials, and renewable energy.

== History ==
Mitr Phol sugar business was established as a small family business in Ban Pong district, Ratchaburi province, producing and trading condensed syrup to sugar mills in 1946. In 1956, the company began to produce its own sugar. In 1983, Mitr Phu Kieo Sugar Mill was constructed in Phu Khiao district, Chaiyaphum province, with a sugarcane processing capacity of 27,000 tonnes per day. In 1990, Mitr Phol Sugar Mill in Suphan Buri province was established with a processing capacity of 45,500 tonnes per day. The company expanded its business internationally in 1993 to Guangxi province, China with four mills. Mitr Phol owns seven sugar mills in Guangxi and with an annual capacity of approximately 10 million tonnes of cane, or approximately 1.3 million tonnes of sugar per year. In 1994, Mitr Phol Sugar Mill (Suphanburi province) was the first mill in Thailand certified by ISO 9002 and has been recognized with a National Certificate of Excellence and Global Standards. In 1995, Mitr Phol took over a sugar company in Phu Wiang district, Khon Kaen province and named it Mitr Phol Phu Wiang Sugar Mill. In 1997, Mitr Phol constructed a sugar mill in Hai Tung County, China. Later in the same year, Mitr Kalasin Sugar Mill was established, in Kuchinarai district, Kalasin province, with a processing capacity of 23,000 tonnes per day. In 2006, Mitr Phol broadened its production to Savannakhet province, Laos and established Mitr Lao Sugar Co., Ltd. to develop sugarcane farming with advanced production technology to export to the European Union. Mitr Phol further expanded its investments to Queensland, Australia.

In 2020, the company was filed a class action lawsuit due to alleged violent eviction allegations in Cambodia in 2008–09, the first transboundary lawsuit of its kind in Southeast Asia.

Following the legal proceedings initiated in 2018 by the plaintiff against Mitr Phol, after the court mediation process, both parties were afforded the opportunity to present their perspectives, thereby enhancing mutual understanding and facilitating a more comprehensive recognition of each other’s viewpoints.

In February 2025, Mitr Phol reached a landmark settlement with the families and agreed to pay a "substantial, though undisclosed" sum to their communities. This was paid in May of that year. The case has now been dismissed.

== Operations ==
In Thailand, Mitr Phol has seven sugar mills, with a total processing capacity of 130,500 tons of sugar cane daily. Some mills have refineries attached and produce white sugar. The locations are:

- Suphan Buri province (Danchang mill)
- Sing Buri province (Sing Buri mill)
- Chaiyaphum province (Mitr Phu Khieo mill)
- Khon Kaen province (Mitr Phu Viang mill)
- Kalasin province (Mitr Kalasin mill)
- Loei province (Mitr Phu Luang mill)
- Amnat Charoen province (Mitr Amnat Charoen mill)

The yearly sugar cane processing capacity is about 20 million tonnes, yielding a sugar output of approximately two million tonnes per year.

Outside Thailand, Mitr Phol has seven sugar mills in Guangxi province, China. In Laos, the "Mitr Lao mill" is in Savannakhet province.

In 2012, Mitr Phol acquired a stake in the Australian sugar producer, MSF Sugar Limited.

== Financials ==
Mitr Phol's 2018 revenues are expected to be 90 billion baht. Sugar production accounts for 50 billion baht of the total and the remainder is contributed by its peripheral businesses. Revenues are flat due to low world sugar prices (US$0.26 per kilogram), but 2018 production is up over 2017.

Mitr Phol has normal capital expenditure at around six billion baht per year. However, in 2016, 28 billion baht will be spent on the sugar business to develop its facilities and water system. Fifteen billion baht will be spent on renewable energy business, three billion baht on wood substitutes, 3.6 billion baht on overseas businesses, and 800 million baht to develop its logistics system. This budget is to be invested from 2016 to 2020.

== Sugar ==
1. Mitr Phol Pure Refined Sugar
2. Mitr Phol Hygiene Pack
3. Mitr Phol Syrup
4. Mitr Flavoured Syrup
5. Mitr Phol Coffee Sugar
6. Mitr Phol Icing Sugar
7. Mitr Phol Stick Sugar
8. Mitr Phol Calorie
9. Mitr Phol Gold Sugar
10. Mitr Phol Coconut Sugar
11. Mitr Phol Rock Sugar
12. Mitr Phol Brown Sugar
13. Mitr Phol Natural Cane Sugar

== Wood substitutes ==
A subsidiary company, Panel Plus Co. Ltd., manufactures particle board and MDF panels from bagasse and rubber wood chips. According to the company, it has the capacity to produce 300,000 cubic metres of particle board a year, 300,000 cubic metres of medium density fibre boards a year, and 23,500,000 square metres of melamine impregnated panels. It has plants in Chaiyaphum and Songkhla provinces.

== Renewable energy ==
The group is the largest biomass electricity producer in ASEAN and the largest ethanol producer in ASEAN.

Mitr Phol's subsidiary company Mitr Phol Bio-Fuel Co., Ltd., has four ethanol plants with total capacity of 1,100,000 liters per day in Suphan Buri, Chaiyaphum, Kalasin, and Tak provinces. Molasses, a waste product from the production of sugar, is used as feed stock to produce ethanol which is used for blending in fuel as gasohol. Mitr Phol Bio-Fuel is Thailand's largest ethanol producer.

Another Mitr Phol subsidiary is Mitr Phol Bio-Power Co., Ltd. which runs several biomass power plants attached to sugar mills. These plants burn the bagasse from crushed sugar cane in order to power steam turbines to generate the power needed for the mill. Excess electricity is sold to the national power grid.

== Related businesses ==
The Vongkusolkit family's related businesses include Banpu Public Company Limited, which is listed on the Stock Exchange of Thailand, and the Erawan Group which owns various prime properties throughout the kingdom including the J.W. Marriott Bangkok Hotel, Ploenchit Center building, Amarin Plaza, and the Hyatt Erawan Hotel.

== Awards ==
Mitr Phol was awarded the Bonsucro Sustainability Award in 2015 for helping sugarcane farmers shift their focus to smart farming, reducing the cost of production by adopting new technology. In 2016, the group became the first company in Thailand and the second firm in Asia to be certified by Bonsucro, an international not for-profit organisation that promotes sustainable sugar cane. Its aim is to reduce the environmental and social impacts of sugarcane production. The group has won numerous other awards.
