= Sathorn Unique Tower =

Unfinished skyscraper in Bangkok, Thailand

- Sathorn Unique Tower in 2021

General information
- Status: On hold
- Location: Bangkok, Thailand
- Coordinates: 13°43′2″N 100°30′55″E
- Construction started: 1990; 36 years ago

Height
- Height: 185 m (607 ft)

Technical details
- Material: Reinforced concrete
- Floor count: 49

Design and construction
- Architect: Rangsan Torsuwan
- Developer: Sathorn Unique Co., Ltd.
- Main contractor: Siphya Construction Co., Ltd.

Sathorn Unique Tower is an unfinished skyscraper located in the Sathon district of Bangkok, Thailand. Planned as a high-rise condominium complex, construction of the building was halted during the 1997 Asian financial crisis, when it was already about 80 percent complete. The Sathorn Unique Tower is now among the most prominent of Bangkok's many derelict buildings, and has become a destination for urban explorers.

== History ==
The Sathorn Unique was planned as a 47 storey luxury condominium tower with 600 units. The building was designed and developed by Rangsan Torsuwan, a prominent architect and real estate developer who also designed Sathorn Unique's sister building, the State Tower. The project was launched in 1990 and was owned by Sathorn Unique Co. Ltd. and mainly financed by the Thai Mex Finance and Securities Company. Construction began in that same year with Siphya Construction Co. Ltd. being the main contractor in charge.

In 1993, in a controversial case that would drag on for fifteen years, Rangsan was arrested for allegedly plotting to murder the President of the Supreme Court, Praman Chansue (the attack never took place). Rangsan was found guilty in 2008 but later acquitted by the Court of Appeal in 2010. The case, however, markedly disrupted Rangsan's ability to secure financial support for his projects, and construction of the Sathorn Unique suffered delays due to lack of funds.

When the Asian financial crisis hit in 1997, Bangkok's real estate market collapsed, and the finance companies that had funded the project went bankrupt and were subsequently liquidated. Construction projects across the city came to a halt, and Bangkok was left with over 300 unfinished high-rise projects. Most of these buildings (State Tower among them) have since been completed as the economy recovered, but Sathorn Unique remains among Bangkok's dozen-plus unfinished "ghost towers", despite negotiations and refinancing efforts by Rangsan's son Pansit Torsuwan, who had joined Rangsan's firm in 2004. This was largely due to Rangsan's insistence that the project only be sold off at a price that would allow the building's original buyers to be repaid in full, instead of declaring bankruptcy and dissolving the company.

== Location, design and status ==
Sathorn Unique Tower is located off Charoen Krung Road, between Soi 51 and 53, in Bangkok's Sathon District. It sits roughly opposite Wat Yan Nawa and is near the end of Sathon Road, where Taksin Bridge and the Saphan Taksin Station of the BTS Skytrain are located. The building, whose design features 49 storeys (including two underground levels), occupies approximately two rai (3,200 square metres, 34,000 sq ft) of land, and is connected to an adjacent ten-storey parking garage. Rangsan's style has been described as "exultant post-modernism, architectural pastiche in which styles and eras are thrown together without any signs of restraint". Like its sister building, the State Tower, Sathorn Unique's design features liberal use of neo-Grecian elements, especially in its columns and balconies. While the building's core structure has been largely completed (construction is estimated to be 80–90 percent complete) and its structural integrity regarded as secure, interior and infrastructural work had barely begun when construction stopped, and the walls and structural details, especially of the upper levels, also remain incomplete.

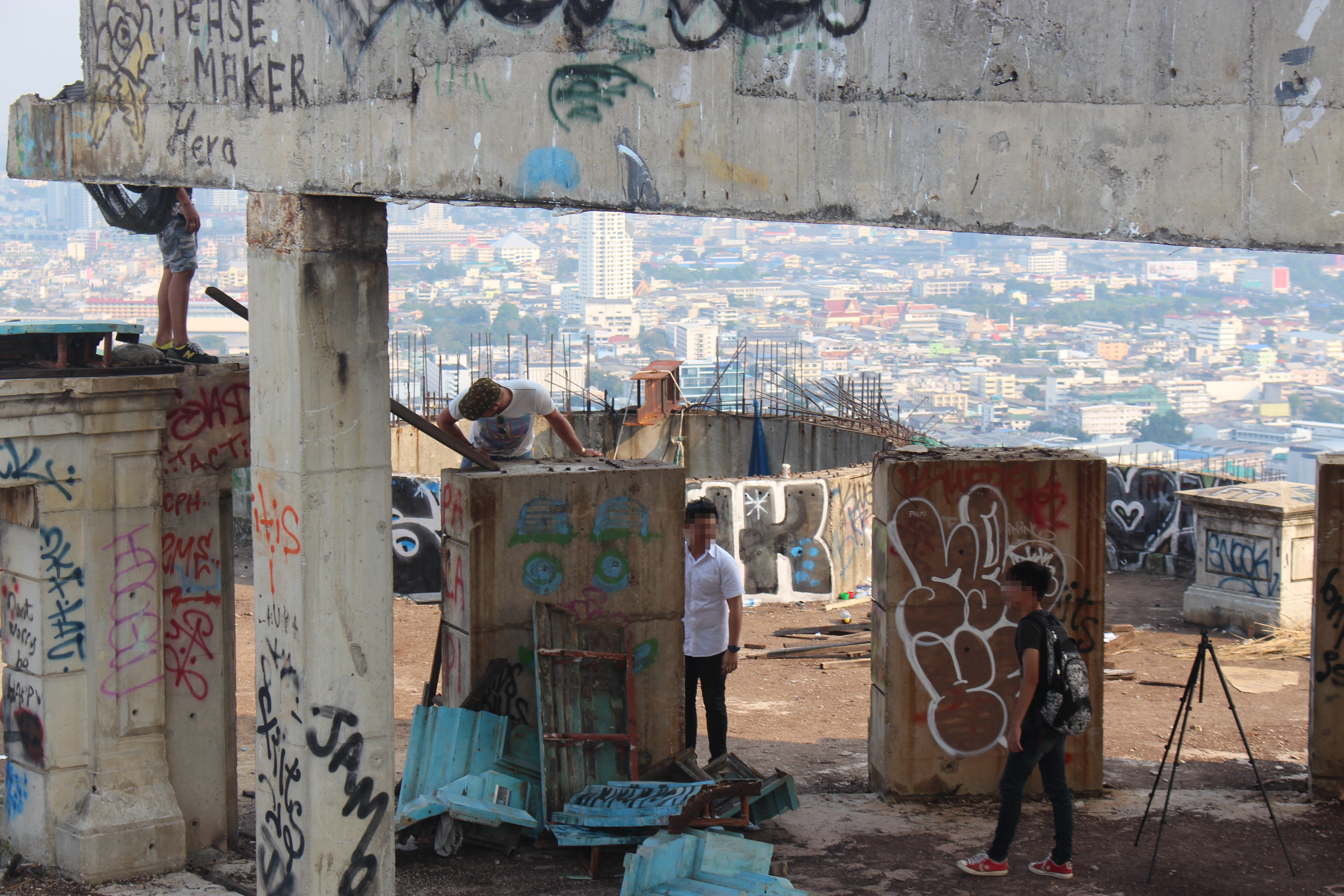
People climbing on the top floor of the building

The building has become known as an urban exploration destination, and has also received attention from international visitors. Despite being officially off-limits to the public, access reportedly can be gained by bribing security guards on the premises. The building reappeared in the news in December 2014, when the body of a Swedish man was found hanged on the 43rd floor. The cause of death was determined to be suicide, though the news prompted discussion regarding the safety and security of the building.

In September 2015, Pansit Torsuwan, now a member of the board of Sathorn Unique Co., revealed that he had filed criminal charges of trespassing against five people who had posted material on the Internet, including a pair of foreigners who had created a video of themselves freerunning on the tower. He said that this was done in order to set an example and deter people from climbing the building, which is dangerous. He added that the number of people illegally entering the premises had risen sharply during the past year, following an increase in online exposure, with over a hundred people entering on some weekends.

In 2017, Pansit allowed Museum Siam to host a seminar at the building as part of its exhibition commemorating the twentieth anniversary of the financial crisis. He also allowed the building to be used as the location of GDH 559 horror film The Promise.

There are several superstitions surrounding the building held by people in the nearby communities. Some believe the building is haunted, as the land upon which it sits is probably a former graveyard. Others believe the location of the building, whose shadow is cast upon the neighbouring Wat Yan Nawa, to be inauspicious, resulting in its failed completion.

== Gallery ==
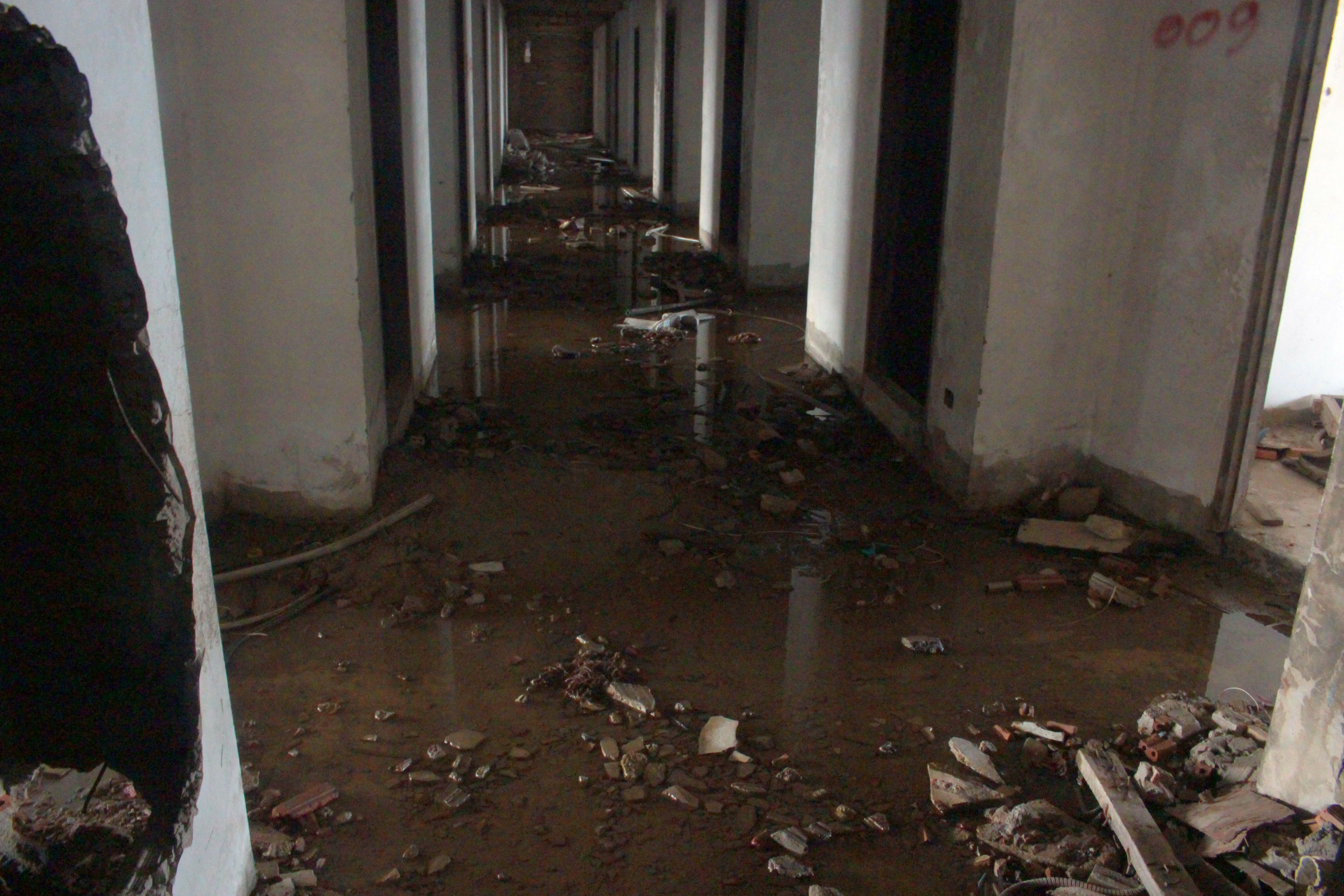
Dilapidated interior of the building

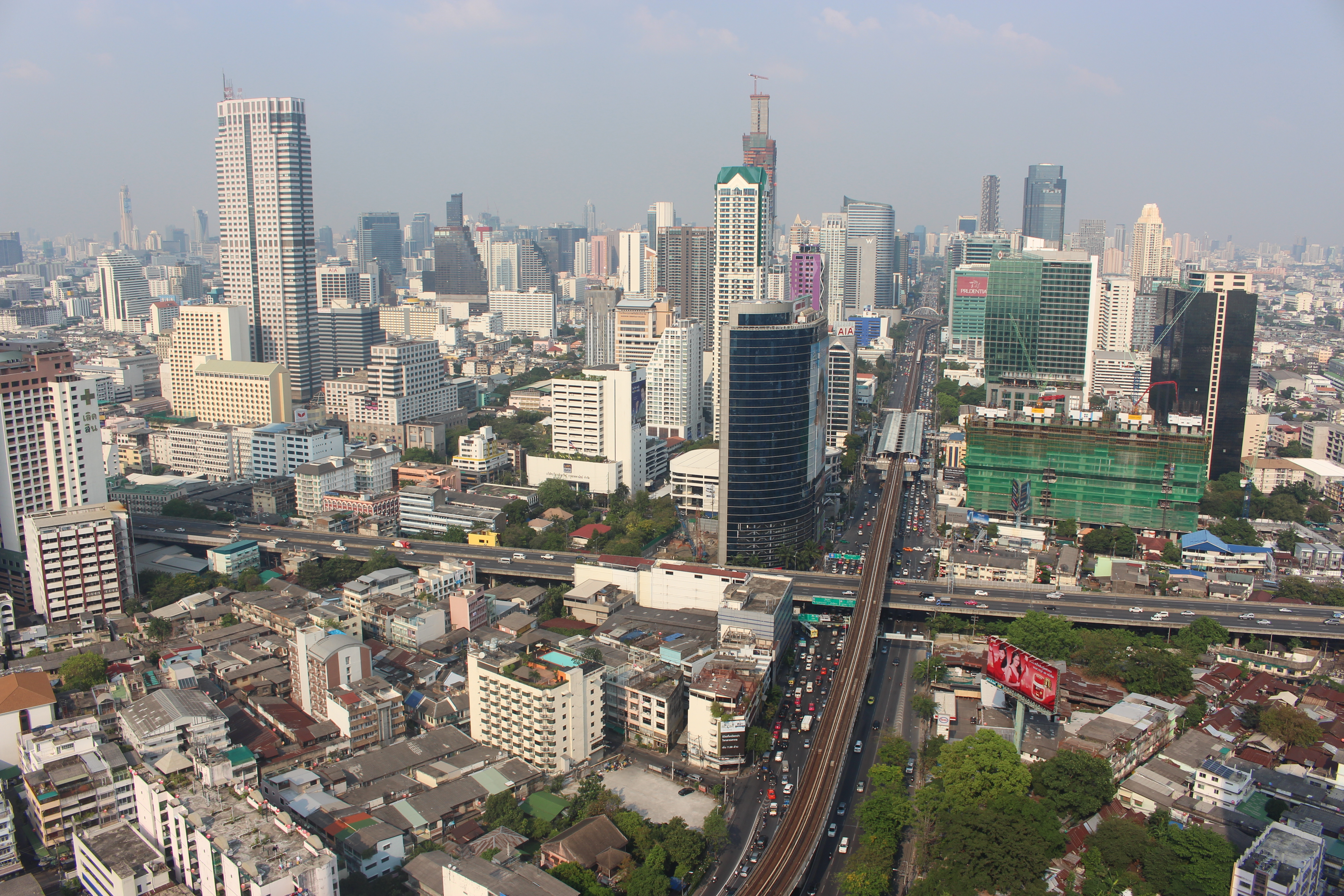
View from the top

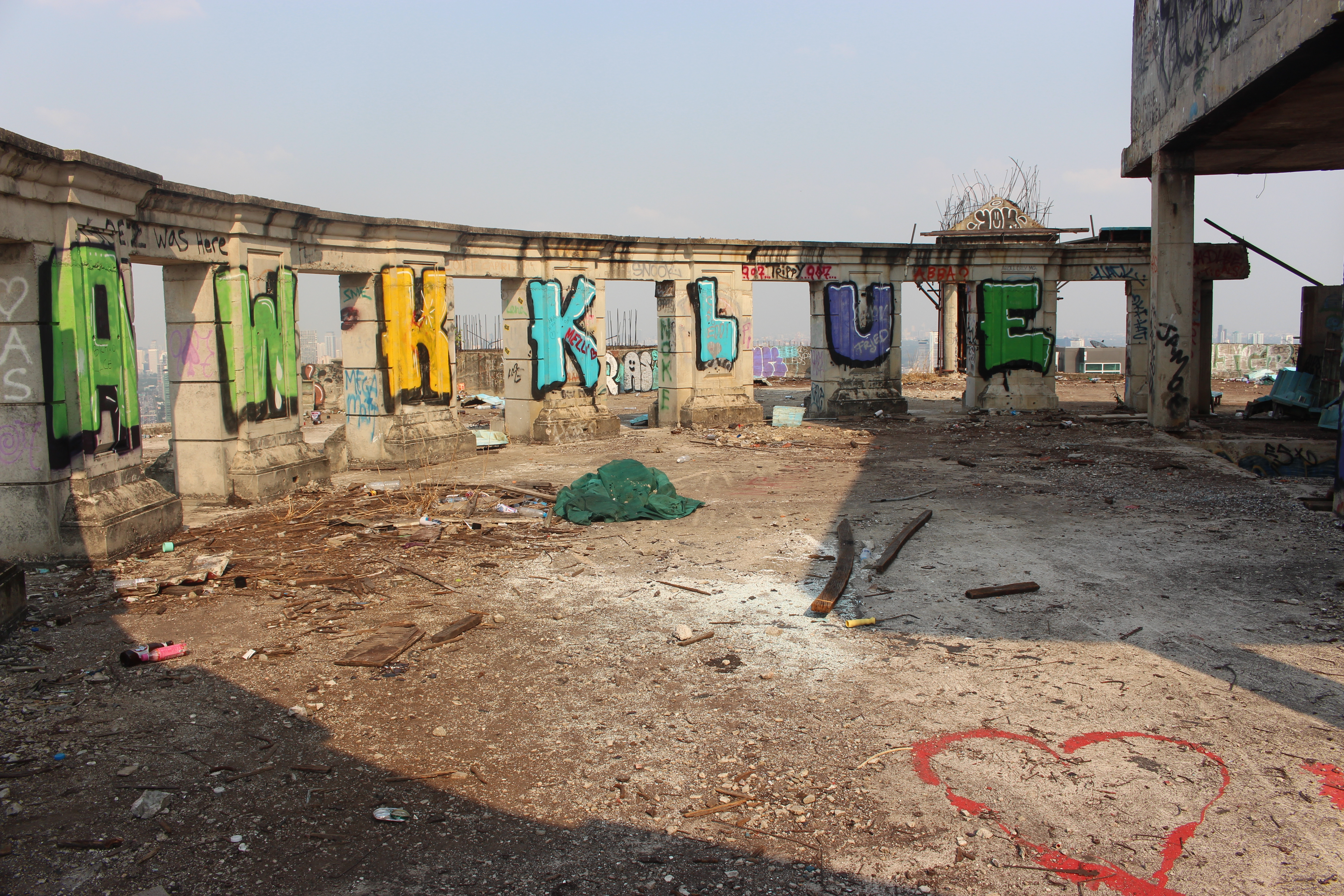
Graffiti at the top
