= State Tower =

Skyscrapers in Bangkok, Thailand

- State Tower from Chao Phraya River in 2018

General information
- Status: Completed
- Location: Bang Rak, Bangkok, Thailand
- Coordinates: 13°43′17.05″N 100°31′00.48″E
- Completed: 2001
- Operator: Challenge Group

Height
- Roof: 247 m (810 ft)

Technical details
- Floor count: 68
- Floor area: 300,000 m^{2} (3,200,000 sq ft)

Design and construction
- Architect: Rangsan Architecture

State Tower is a skyscraper located on Si Lom Road, Bang Rak district, Bangkok, Thailand, adjacent to Charoen Krung Road. Built in 2001, it has a floor area of 300,000 m^{2} (3,200,000 sq ft). State Tower has 68 floors and is 247 m (810 ft) tall, making it the 8th tallest building in Thailand. It is also the tallest mixed-use building in Thailand.

Conceived by Thai architect Professor Rangsan Torsuwan in the early 1990s and designed by Rangsan Architecture, the massive building is characterised by its thirty-meter tall golden rooftop dome and neo-classical balconies. It was originally named "Silom Precious Tower", later "Royal Charoen Krung Tower" (RCK Tower) and then "State Tower".

State Tower contains condominiums, serviced apartments, offices and retail units. It is also home to two five-star hotels, lebua at State Tower and Tower Club at lebua. Sirocco, an open-air restaurant with a panoramic view of Bangkok, is located on the 63rd floor. There are two Michelin starred restaurants on the top floors of the tower, owned and managed by lebua Hotels and Resorts.

State Tower is owned by Challenge Group. In 2015, Nusasiri PLC bought non-performing condominium units from Bangkok Commercial Asset Management Co and renovated for resell. The total units bought was 166 spanning floors 28-32 and 42-50.

== See also ==
- List of tallest buildings in Thailand
- Sathorn Unique Tower, similarly designed sister building which remains unfinished
