= Wattanavekin family =

Sino-Thai business family

The Wattanavekin family (Thai: วัธนเวคิน) is a Sino-Thai business family of Hakka origin. The family is descended from its late patriarch Kiat Wattanavekin (丘細見), who migrated to Siam as a child in the 1910s with his mother. Kiat built up businesses in the liquor, construction, sugar, and banking industries, establishing Kiatnakin Finance and Securities Company (now Kiatnakin Phatra Bank) in 1971. Eastern Sugar & Cane Company forms the family's other major holding; it also holds a stake in The Erawan Group, together with the Vongkusolkit family. Forbes lists the family, with Kiat's widow Chansamorn Wattanavekin as its head, as the 48th richest in Thailand, as of 2023.
