= Erawan Hotel =

Former hotel in Bangkok, Thailand

Coordinates: 13°44′36″N 100°32′26″E

The Erawan Hotel in 1960

The Erawan Hotel (Thai: โรงแรมเอราวัณ) was a luxury hotel in the Thai capital Bangkok. It was one of the first modern hotels built to accommodate the expansion of international air travel, and was operated by the government-owned company The Syndicate of Thai Hotels and Tourists Enterprises. It opened in 1956, following many delays which prompted the construction of the Erawan Shrine to ward off bad fortune. After initial struggles, the hotel prospered in the 1960s under the management of Chalermchai Charuvastr, who featured a Thai atmosphere in its decor and services, but declined in the following decades as it faced rising competition. The hotel stood until 1988, when it was demolished for redevelopment under a private joint venture. It reopened in 1991 as the Grand Hyatt Erawan.

== History ==
=== Establishment ===
During the post-World War II period, the government of Prime Minister Plaek Phibunsongkhram adopted a policy of promoting the hospitality industry in order to accommodate the rise in international air travel. A government project, initiated by finance minister Prayoon Pamornmontri, was then launched to build a modern luxury hotel for Bangkok's hosting of the 45th Inter-Parliamentary Union (IPU) conference in 1956. This was undertaken through a state enterprise, The Syndicate of Thai Hotels and Tourists Enterprises, which was founded in 1953 with police chief Phao Sriyanond as its head.

The company originally planned to build the hotel on the corner of Sala Daeng Intersection occupied by Lumphini Park, but the idea was rejected. Instead, a location on the southeast corner of Ratchaprasong Intersection in Pathum Wan District was chosen instead. The Crown Property Bureau, which owned the land, acquired a minority stake in the company's shares as part of the purchase.

Construction began shortly after, but the project was plagued by delays and accidents, and costs rose from the planned 20 million baht (US$1M) to 100 million ($5M). Rumours that the setbacks were caused by malevolent supernatural causes gained traction, and advice was sought from Luang Suwichanphaet, a naval physician and mystic. He stated that the building's foundation stone had been laid on an inauspicious date, and recommended that a shrine to the Hindu god Brahma (known in Thai representation as Phra Phrom) be built to appease the gods and ward off the evil fortune. This was done as construction of the hotel was completed in 1956, and the Erawan Shrine would later become a highly famous spiritual landmark. The hotel building was designed in the applied Thai style, with an ornamented gabled roof topping the four-storey structure housing 175 (later expanded to 250) guest rooms. It was opened by Phibunsongkhram on 9 November 1956, a week prior to the IPU conference.

=== Operations ===
The hotel initially struggled in its operations due to a lack of expertise among Thai staff, but was successfully turned around when Chalermchai Charuvastr, an army general who had just become the first director of the Tourist Organisation of Thailand (now the Tourism Authority of Thailand), was brought on to oversee its management in 1960. Chalermchai promoted hospitality career paths for young women, and pushed to make Thainess a distinctive atmosphere at the hotel. Its interior was redone, Thai cuisine featured in its restaurant, and employees would now wear Thai-style costumes. This positioning would be replicated by new establishments such as the Siam InterContinental and the Dusit Thani hotels in the following years.

The Erawan prospered in the 1960s, hosting many foreign dignitaries and celebrities, but declined over the 1970s as it was unable to face rising competition from private enterprises. From 1979, the company board explored several plans to revive the hotel, and after several years it was finally decided to demolish the hotel for redevelopment under a private joint venture. The plan was approved by the Cabinet in 1985, and the Erawan finally closed down on 2 January 1988.

The redevelopment contract was awarded to the Amarin Plaza Company (now The Erawan Group), the owner of the next-door Amarin Plaza. The new hotel was opened under the Hyatt brand in 1991, as the Grand Hyatt Erawan.

== See also ==
- Airavata, known as Erawan in Thai, the Hindu mythical elephant which served as the hotel's namesake
