= Banpu =

Energy company based in Thailand

Banpu Public Company Limited
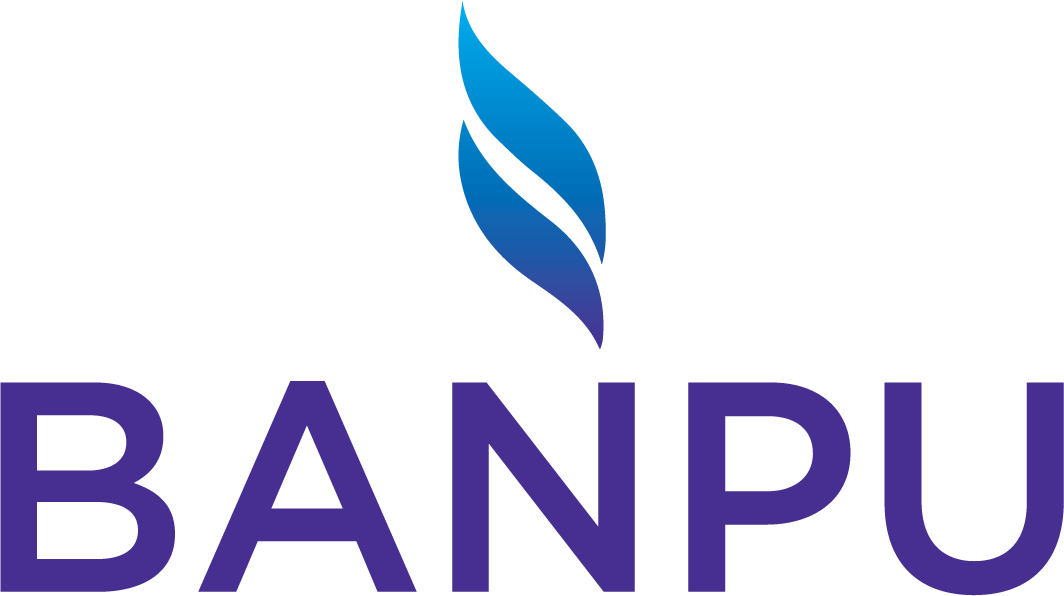
- Type: Public
- Traded as: SET: BANPU
- ISIN: TH0148A10Z06
- Industry: Energy
- Founded: 16 May 1983; 43 years ago
- Headquarters: Bangkok, Thailand
- Key people: Somruedee Chaimongkol (CEO)
- Products: Coal; Electrical power
- Revenue: ▲123,345 million baht (2018)
- Net income: ▲6,694 million baht (2018)
- Total assets: ▲274,317 million baht (2018)
- Total equity: ▼83,060 million baht (2018)
- Number of employees: 6,037 (2018)
- Subsidiaries: Banpu Power
- Website: www.banpu.com

Banpu Public Company Limited is an energy company based in Thailand. Its three core businesses are energy resources (coal and gas); energy generation (conventional and renewable); and energy technology (wind and solar, storage systems, and energy technologies). As of 2015 Banpu is headed by CEO Somruedee Chaimongkol. In the 2012 Forbes Global 2000, Banpu was ranked as the 1707th -largest public company in the world.

== History ==
Banpu was founded by members of the Vongkusolkit and Auapinyakul families on 16 May 1983 as Ban Pu Coal Company Limited. The company was created to subcontract a coal mining operation at Banpu Mine (BP-1 Mine) in Li District, Lamphun Province. On 4 May 1989, Banpu was listed on the Stock Exchange of Thailand (SET). Its name was changed on 29 July 1993 to Banpu Public Company Limited.

In 2005, Banpu entered into a joint venture with Thai-Lao Lignite Co., Ltd. and Hong Sa Lignite (Lao PDR) Co., Ltd. to develop the project, but this agreement was terminated in 2006. A UNCITRAL arbitration found that the Lao government illegally terminated concession and ordered Laos to pay US$57 million in damages plus interest. Laos is refusing to pay.

In 2010 Banpu bought the Australian mining company Centennial Coal.

Current CEO of Banpu Somruedee Chaimongkol assumed the position on 10 April 2015.

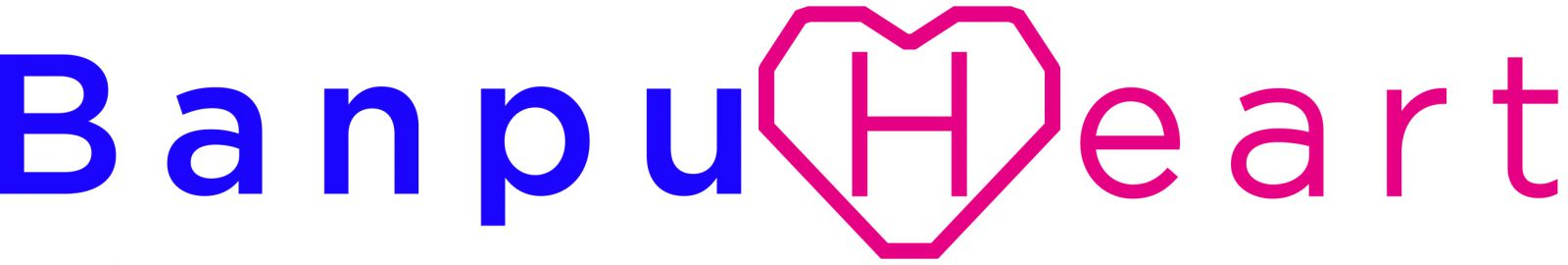
Banpu Heart

Banpu decided to launch a new corporate branding attributes in 2018, the "Banpu Heart".

== Operations ==
=== Power generation ===
Banpu Power Public Company Limited or Banpu Power (BPP) was established in 1996 (then named "Cogeneration PLC") as a subsidiary of Banpu PCL. BPP's generating capacity as of early-2019 is 2,140 megawatts. Its goal is to expand that number to 4,300 MW by 2025. Renewable power projects account for 20 percent of BPP-generated electricity.

=== Coal mining ===
It is the largest coal producer in Thailand and also has coal mining operations in Indonesia and China, and coal-fired power generation operations in Thailand and China. Banpu plans also to invest in the Hong Sa lignite mine and power plant project in Laos.

Banpu's main coal resources are in Indonesia (26 million tonnes), Australia (14 million tonnes), and China (4.7 million tonnes). It expects its sales to rise to 45 million tonnes in 2018, up from 42 million tonnes in 2017.

Due to its coal mining operations, Banpu was named on a 2019 list of the 100 companies "...responsible for most of the world's greenhouse gas emissions".

=== Centennial Coal ===
Centennial Coal Company Ltd operates five mines in New South Wales (NSW) supplying coal for export and approximately 40 percent of NSW's coal-fired electricity. The company sells approximately 40 percent of its coal to export markets, primarily for use in power stations and steel mills in Japan, Korea, Taiwan and Europe.

Centennial Coal has been responsible for more than 900 pollution notices between 2000 and 2013 from the NSW Environment Protection Authority (EPA). In 2015 it was responsible for a major release of coal fines into the Wollangambe River and World Heritage listed areas of the Blue Mountains National Park. Centennial Coal has been dumping mine effluent into the Wollangambe River for approximately 30 years, effectively killing large sections of it. Between 2000 and 2015, Centennial's Clarence Colliery has been cited for more than 65 non-compliance breaches of its licence. As of 2015, Centennial Coal has applied to extend the Springvale Mine, undermining swamps of "National Environmental Significance" and dumping up to 50 million litres a day of mine effluent into the Coxs River which also flows through the Blue Mountains World Heritage area and into Sydney's drinking water catchments.

=== Banpu NEXT ===
Formed in 2019 as a joint venture between Banpu and Banpu Power (BPP), Banpu NEXT is the company's energy technology division. The division is targeted towards providing energy solutions for storage systems, battery-powered electric vehicles, energy efficiency management, and smart city projects.

== Corporate issues ==
=== Financials ===
Banpu reported revenues of 123,345 million baht for its fiscal year ending 31 December 2018. Net income was 6,694 million baht, total assets 274,312 million baht, and total equity 83,060 million baht. Banpu's coal business accounted for 87% of its revenues for the year.

As of 31 December 2018, Banpu employed 6,037 persons, nearly half of them at its coal operations in Indonesia. Banpu employed 383 persons in Thailand, 6% of its workforce.

Remuneration of the twelve directors on the Banpu board totaled 48 million baht. The eight senior managers earned 110 million baht in salary and bonuses.
