= Lebua Hotels & Resorts =

Thai hospitality company

- Company type: Private
- Industry: Hospitality
- Founded: 2003 (Bangkok, Thailand)
- Headquarters: Bangkok, Thailand
- Number of locations: 5
- Key people: Narawadee Bualert, President & Chief Executive Officer
- Services: Hotels, restaurants, and bars
- Website: lebua.com

Lebua Hotels & Resorts is Bangkok-based luxury hotels and restaurants company with locations in Thailand, India, and New Zealand. Founded in 2003 with one restaurant, lebua has recently expanded into the German fine dining market under the leadership of Narawadee Bualert, President & Chief Executive Officer.

== See also ==
- List of companies of Thailand
