= The Erawan Group =

- Company type: Public
- Traded as: SET: ERW
- ISIN: TH0120010Y07
- Industry: Retailing, Hotel management, Real estate
- Founded: 29 December 1982
- Headquarters: Bangkok, Thailand
- Key people: Mr. Petch Krainukul, President
- Products: Shopping centers, department stores, hotels
- Website: www.theerawan.com

The Erawan Group Public Company Limited is a hospitality company of Thailand, formerly known as Amarin Plaza PCL. The company and its affiliates operate hotels, office buildings and shopping centers. The Erawan is headquartered in Bangkok and listed on the SET100 Index of the Stock Exchange of Thailand.

== History ==
The Erawan Group was founded as the Amarin Plaza Company in 1982, a partnership between the Vongkusolkit and Wattanavekin families, in order to build and operate the Amarin Plaza shopping mall. It was the Vongkusolkits' first diversification into real estate, as the family, owners of the Mitr Phol Group, mainly did businesses in the sugar industry. The Wattanavekins were the founders of Kiatnakin Bank, and also had sugar and cane businesses. The project was conceived when Isara Vongkusolkit was offered a deal with the Srivikorn family, who owned the land on Phloen Chit Road near the Ratchaprasong Intersection.

The company expanded into the hospitality industry in a government joint-venture to rebuild the Erawan Hotel, which neighboured Amarin Plaza. The company was listed on the Stock Exchange of Thailand (SET) in 1988 in order to raise capital for the project, which was opened as the Grand Hyatt Erawan in 1991. The company then expanded into further properties, opening the Ploenchit Center office building and the JW Marriott Hotel Bangkok in 1997. The company survived the 1997 financial crisis thanks to its hotels, which were able to quote prices in dollars and thus benefited from the baht's loss of value, but was still forced to offload several properties and offer preferred stock to WREP Thailand Holdings, a real estate fund of Singaporean/American investors. The company has since focused on the hospitality industry, which came to generate over 70 percent of its revenue by 2004, when the company was recategorized as such by the SET.

As of 2010, the company is 39 percent owned by the Vongkusolkit family, 31 percent by the Wattanavekin family, and the remaining 30 percent is held by funds and individual investors.

== Operations ==
Erawan's business is organized into two areas:

- Hotels: Erawan manages the Grand Hyatt Erawan Bangkok, JW Marriott Bangkok, THE NAKA Island a luxury collection resort & spa Phuket, Courtyard by Marriott Bangkok and the Renaissance Ko Samui Resort and Spa.
- Office buildings and shopping centers: shopping center operations include Ploenchit Center and Erawan Bangkok Boutique Mall.

The company has eight subsidiaries involved in property management and hospitality.
