= Rangsan Torsuwan =

Thai architect

Rangsan Torsuwan (Thai: รังสรรค์ ต่อสุวรรณ, RTGS: Rangsan Tosuwan; born 1939) is a Thai architect, known for many buildings during Bangkok's period of explosive growth from the 1980s to early 1990s.

Rangsan graduated from the Faculty of Architecture of Chulalongkorn University and attained a Master's at the Massachusetts Institute of Technology, returning to Thailand in 1967. He initially worked under his former professor Krisda Arunvongse, before setting up his own firm. He also taught as an assistant professor at Chulalongkorn, until 1992.

Rangsan's style has been described as "exultant post-modernism, architectural pastiche in which styles and eras are thrown together without any signs of restraint". Among his best known works are the State Tower (a gigantic skyscraper topped with a golden dome), the Amarin Plaza shopping mall, and the unfinished Sathorn Unique Tower, all of which use oversized Greek columns, pediments and other elements to decorate the buildings' exteriors. His work is quite controversial, and often receives indirect criticism from his peers in the field.
