= Vongkusolkit family =

Sino-Thai business family

Vongkusolkit ว่องกุศลกิจ
- Current region: Bangkok
- Heirlooms: Mitr Phol Group

The Vongkusolkit family (Thai: ว่องกุศลกิจ) is a Sino-Thai business family. It does business in the sugar, coal and hospitality industries through its major holdings Mitr Phol, Banpu and The Erawan Group. The family, headed by Isara Vongkusolkit, is ranked by Forbes as the 24th richest in Thailand as of 2021.
