= Khao Lam Road, Bangkok =

Street in Thailand

Coordinates: 13°44′11.32″N 100°30′53.18″E

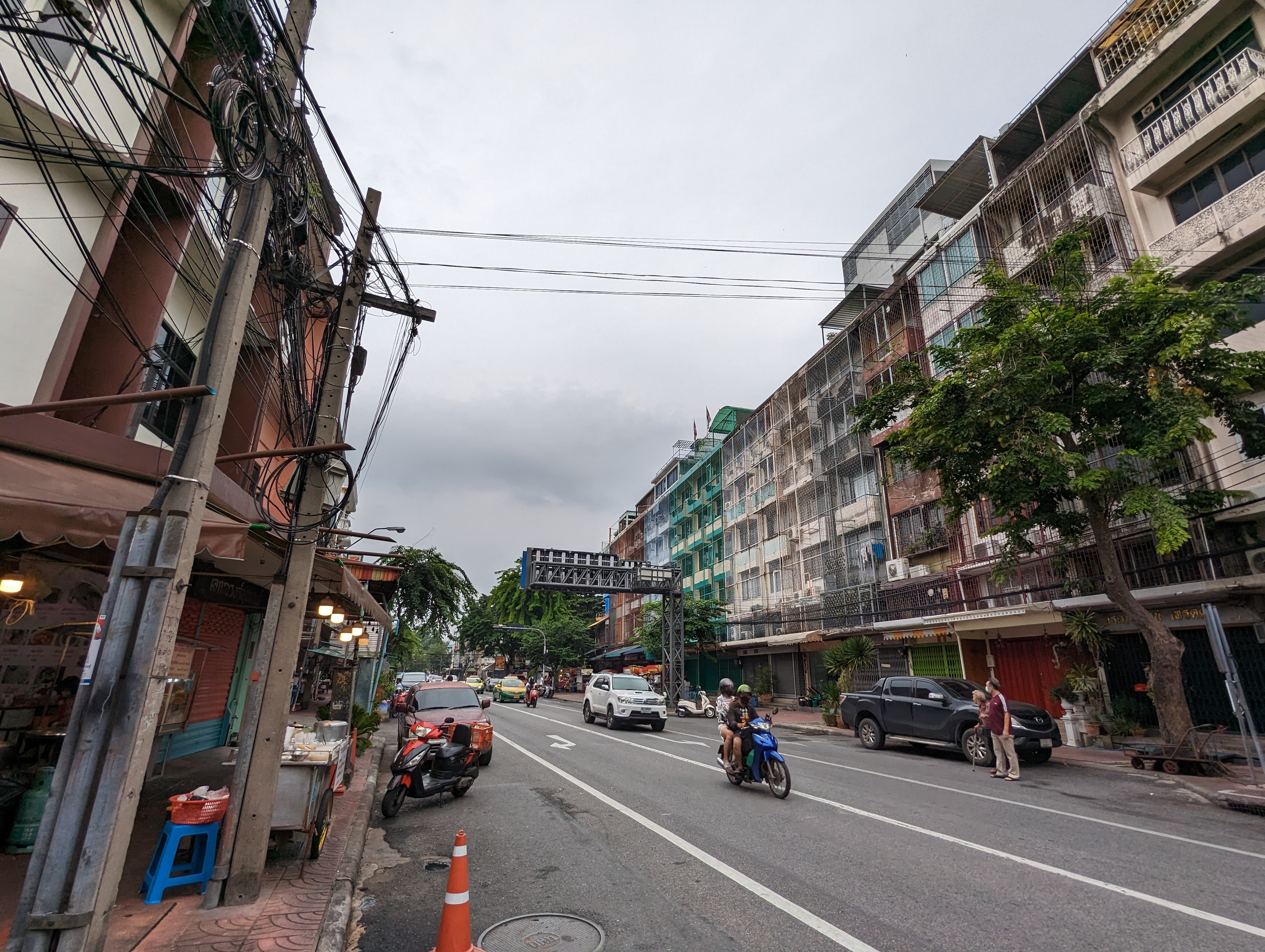
Khao Lam Road

Khao Lam Road (Thai: ถนนข้าวหลาม (Note: Literally means "Cooked Sticky Rice in Bamboo Cane Street", but its exact origin is still unknown.), RTGS: Thanon Khao Lam, pronounced [tʰā.nŏn kʰâːw lǎːm]) is a short one-way street in the Talat Noi area within Bangkok's Chinatown, beginning at the intersection of Charoen Krung and Song Wat Roads (Khao Lam Circle), running northeast across Khlong Phadung Krung Kasem, and ending at Maha Phruttharam Road near the Hua Lamphong intersection in Bang Rak District.

Historically, the area was home to a pork butchery that received deliveries from Hua Lamphong railway station, earning the nicknames "Trok Rong Moo" (Thai: ตรอกโรงหมู, [tɔ̀ːk rōːŋ mū], lit. 'lane of pork slaughterhouse') or "Trok Sukon" (Thai: ตรอกสุกร, [tɔ̀ːk sù.kon], lit. 'lane of swine'), with pig pens for holding livestock.

Today, the former alley, which originally was the area of Trok Rong Moo, corresponds to the officially named Soi Sukon, Soi Sukon 1, and Soi Sukon 2. It can also be accessed from Mittraphap Thai–China Road beside Wat Traimit, home to the world's largest golden Buddha statue. The neighbourhood is now lively and colourful, with a mix of restaurants and small food stalls serving barbecued pork over rice, pork satay, congee, oyster omelets, fresh spring rolls, yen ta fo noodles, tomyam noodle soups, chicken rice, egg noodles with wontons with red roasted pork, grilled pork skewers, and homemade ice cream, bustling both day and night. Additionally, Soi Sukon 1 was home to Galaxy Boxing Promotion (now TL Promotion), the office of promoter Niwat Laosuwanwat, who managed the legendary Thai boxer Khaosai Galaxy.

Since February 2025, the Khao Lam Circle, the starting point of the road, has become a new landmark and popular spot for visitors. This is due to a local junkyard operator from Siang Kong assembling various scrap metal pieces into a sculpture of Optimus Prime, the protagonist from the Transformers franchise. The installation has attracted attention as people come to pay respects and hold ceremonial dances in its honour.
