= Song Wat Road =

Road in Bangkok, Thailand

Coordinates: 13°44′21.57″N 100°30′13.51″E

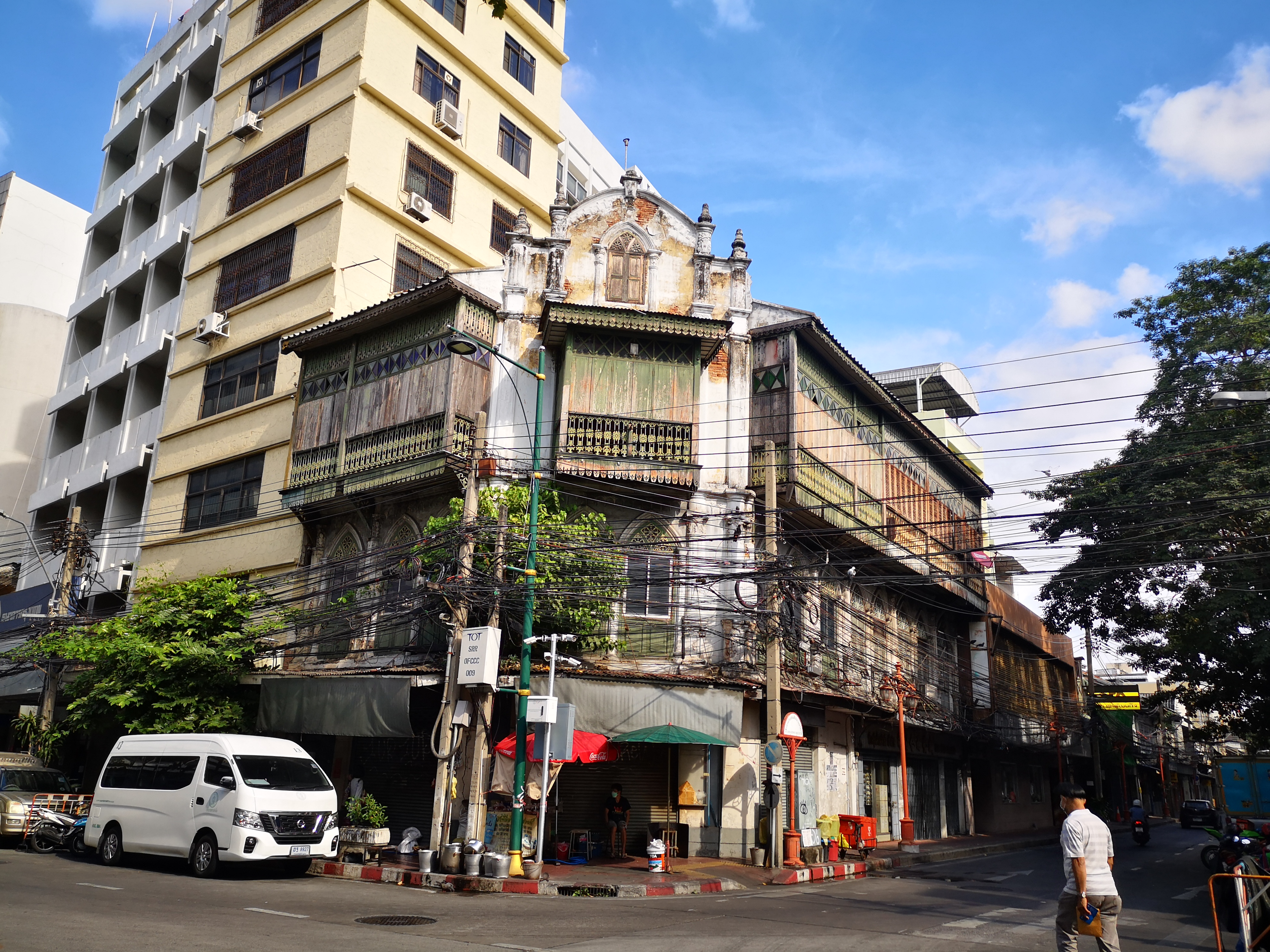
An old corner building building at the start of Song Wat Road

Song Wat Road (Thai: ถนนทรงวาด, RTGS: Thanon Song Wat, pronounced [tʰā.nǒn sōŋ wâːt]) is a historic road in the Samphanthawong district of Bangkok, Thailand. It begins at Ratchawong Road near Ratchawong Pier and extends to Khao Lam Circle, where it meets Khao Lam and Charoen Krung roads in Talat Noi subdistrict, in Sieng Kong. The road runs for 1.2 kilometres (0.75 mi), following the Chao Phraya River for almost its entire length.

The name "Song Wat" translates to "drawing by the king". The road was built by King Chulalongkorn (Rama V) in 1892, following a great fire in the Sampheng area. The Siamese government aimed to expand roads and public utilities to a wider area. It is said that Chulalongkorn personally drew the road's route on the map with a pencil.

Construction was carried out in two phases: the first, from Chak Phet Road to Trok Rong Krata (now Yaowaphanit Road), was completed in 1892; the second, from Trok Rong Krata to Charoen Krung Road, was completed in 1907, resulting in the road's present form.

Song Wat Road then developed to function as a main access to water transport in the area, with a number of minor roads and alleyways connecting with the port that served steamship communication between Chon Buri Province, Ban Don (Surat Thani Province), and Bangkok, as well as barges running between seaside towns and the capital. Song Wat area therefore was the main transport passage for seafood, vegetables, and plants. The road is also the origin of the businesses of many Thai Chinese millionaire families, such as Chearavanont and Sirivadhanabhakdi.

Along the road, there are various places of worship, such as Lao Pun Tao Kong Joss House, a Chinese folk shrine; Masjid Luang Kocha Itsahak, a mosque of the Islamic faith; and Wat Pathum Khongkha, a Thai Buddhist temple.

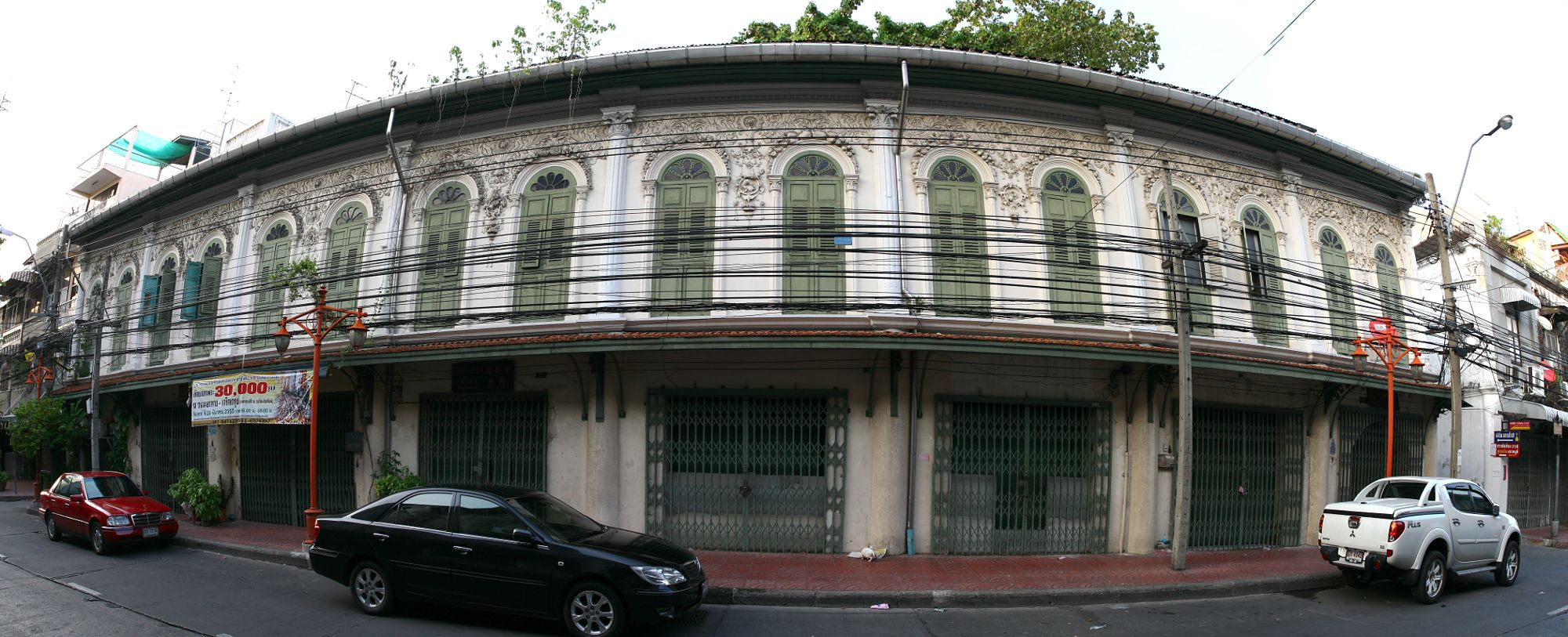
Row of old shophouses on the Song Wat Road

Song Soem Road (ถนนทรงเสริม, RTGS: Thanon Song Soem, [tʰā.nǒn sōŋ sɤ̌ːm]), which branches off from Song Wat, is considered the shortest road in Thailand, at only 20 metres (66 ft), ending at a pier on the Chao Phraya River. On the opposite bank are Lhong 1919 and the Wanglee House.

In 2023, Song Wat Road was named 39th among 40 coolest neighbourhoods in the world by Time Out.

== See also ==
- Bangkok's Chinatown
