= Heather MacLean =

Heather MacLean or Heather Maclean can refer to:

- Heather Maclean (author) (born 1972), American author
- Heather MacLean (swimmer) (born 1992), Canadian swimmer who participated in the 2012 Summer Olympics
- Heather MacLean (runner) (born 1995), American middle distance runner
- Heather L. MacLean, Canadian professor of civil engineering

== See also ==
- Heather McLean (born 1993), Canadian speed skater
