= Business Today (student magazine) =

- President: Brian Zhou
- Former editors: Akshat Agarwal, Alison Lee
- Frequency: Bi-Annual
- Circulation: 250,000
- Founded: 1968
- Company: Foundation for Student Communications, Inc.
- Country: United States
- Based in: Princeton University
- Language: English
- Website: businesstoday.org

Business Today is an American, non-profit student organization headquartered in Princeton, New Jersey, and run by Princeton University undergraduates. Founded in 1968 as a magazine, the organization has continued to expand to include conference and seminar programming.

The organization continues to publish a magazine twice a year, maintains an online journal, and hosts three annual national conferences: the International Conference, the Design Nation Conference, and the Boost Conference.

== History ==
=== Origins ===
Business Today was founded as a magazine in 1968 by Steve Forbes, Michael Mims, and Jon Perel, who were students at Princeton University at the time. Created in an era where business and finance was facing backlash from the public, Forbes, Mims, and Perel's magazine immediately caught the attention of the outside world. Later in 1968, the three co-founders were interviewed on the Today Show with Hugh Downs, giving the magazine nationwide notoriety.

=== 1970s ===
In 1971, Business Today became a nonprofit foundation. The same year, the organization hosted its first conference, “Business Tomorrow,” which would eventually evolve into the present-day International Conference. This first conference lasted from October 20–22. Speakers included Richard Clarke and Ralph Nader. The event was held in Sheraton Park Hotel in Washington, D.C.

The conferences originally happened sporadically and in cities around the country, but by the mid-to-late 70s, they became more regular and concentrated geographically. In 1974, the first official annual International Conference was held in New York City, inviting students from around the globe to participate.

In 1976, Meg Whitman became Vice President of Business Today.

=== 1980s to 2000s ===
In 1988, Wendy Kopp became President of Business Today. She brainstormed the idea of Teach for America during an International Conference.

In 2007, Michael Kratsios became President of Business Today.

=== 2010s ===
In the 2010s, Business Today began greatly expanding its programming for college students, as well as increasing its editorial capacities.

In 2012, Business Today hosted the Start @ a Startup conference. During the same year, Business Today published its Online Journal, which features editorial pieces, interviews, career pieces, seminar coverage, and conference coverage.

In 2013, Business Today launched its Women in Business Conference, which would eventually become rebranded as HerVentures and then re-encompassed within the International Conference.

In 2017, Mihika Kapoor spearheaded the first Design Nation conference for undergraduate students. Business Today also launched its first annual Breakout trip, allowing for 15 students to visit companies around New York City.

In 2018, Business Today celebrated its 50th anniversary.

In 2024, the International Conference will celebrate its 50th anniversary.

== Business Today Magazine ==
Business Today is an American magazine created by and for college students. It was founded in 1968 by three students at Princeton University—Jonathan Perel, Steve Forbes, and Michael Mims. Currently, Business Today is the largest student-run magazine in the United States. It is published twice a year, and has a distribution base of over 200,000 college students and business executives.

== International Conference ==
The Business Today International Conference is the organization's largest and signature event, and known as North America's largest nonprofit undergraduate business conference. Held annually in New York City, the all-expenses-paid event brings distinguished undergraduate students from around the world together with current business and world leaders to discuss and share perspectives on relevant business issues. Past keynote speakers at the conference have included Gerald Ford, Andrea Jung, Brad Smith, and Henry Kissinger. The conference also holds a social entrepreneurship pitch competition, the Impact Challenge, which awards $15,000 in seed funding to the top student-created venture. This challenge is judged by finance professionals.

Most recently, the 50th International Conference, themed "Renaissance," took place in November 2024. The conference saw increased participation, with 133 students selected from over 3000 applicants, 38% identifying as first-generation and low-income. This also marked the first virtual summit to facilitate interactions between executives and 227 additional students. A writing competition and Impact Challenge offered alternate means of admission to the conference.

Over 75 executives attend the event, with speakers including Steve Forbes, Blair Effron, Fabrice Grinda, Michael Kratsios, and James Daunt. The conference was staffed by a team of 100 Princeton students selected through a rigorous application process.

The International Conference is the largest conference of its kind in the United States.

== Design Nation Conference ==
Design Nation is an annual conference held in New York City. The conference brings together approximately 100 undergraduate students to discuss the application of design and design education around the world.

== Digitalization ==
In the wake of the COVID-19 Pandemic, Business Today focused heavily on producing digital content and adapting to a growing digital age. The spring of 2020 saw the first Digital Design Nation Conference. 2023 marked the initiation of the International Conference's virtual summit.

== Former members ==
- Steve Forbes - Editor-in-Chief of Forbes magazine
- Wendy Kopp - Founder of Teach for America
- Meg Whitman - President and CEO of Hewlett-Packard; formerly eBay
- Heather Maclean - Author and Founder of Little Laureate
- Michael Kratsios - Chief Technology Officer of the United States at The White House
- J. Christopher Donahue - President and CEO of Federated Investors
- A.J. Agarwal - Managing Director at the Blackstone Group
- Nathan Faust - Co-Founder and COO of Jet.com
- Tom Szaky - Founder of CEO of TerraCycle
- Moira Forbes - President and Publisher at Forbes
- Alexandra Kennedy - Director, Global Head of Partnership Strategy and Operations at Twitter
- Josh Berman - Executive producer on CSI; Consulting producer on Bones
- Alex de Campi - Music video director, Comics writer and Columnist.
- Banthoon Lamsam - Chairman and CEO of Kasikornbank PCL; Successor to Lamsam family business
- Blair Effron - Partner and Co-Founder at Centerview Partners
- James Forese - Former President at Citigroup
- Leon Kalvaria - Chairman, Institutional Clients Group, Citigroup
- Michael Edward Braxton - Philanthropist, Current Director of Development at the Pittsburgh Opera
