= Lamsam family =

Thai Chinese business family

Lamsam ล่ำซำ Sae-ung
- Parent family: Wu family
- Current region: Bangkok
- Origin: Jiexi, Jieyang
- Founded: Rama V era
- Founder: Ung Miao Ngian (immigrant); Ung Yuk Long Lamsam (adopted surname)
- Current head: Photipong Lamsam
- Connected families: House of Devakula; Wanglee family Chatikavanij family

The Lamsam family (Thai: ล่ำซำ) is a Thai family of Chinese descent. Notable as the founders of Kasikornbank, the extended family owns businesses in the banking and insurance industries. The family's current head, Banthoon Lamsam, together with his family, is listed by Forbes as the 27th richest in Thailand in 2017.

The Lamsam family traces its roots to Ung Miao Ngian (Chinese: 伍淼源, of the Ng (伍) clan), a Hakka immigrant from Guangdong who moved to Thailand (then known as Siam) during the reign of King Chulalongkorn (Rama V, 1868–1910). He established himself in the timber industry, setting up shop in 1901 and later expanding into rice milling. He married two wives and had six children. His third son, Ung Yuk Long, inherited the business and led the family's most dominant branch. Yuk Long had three wives, with six sons and six daughters. His second wife Thongyu, a daughter of the Wanglee family, was the mother of the three of his sons—Choti, Chulin and Kasem Lamsam—who would establish Kasikornbank and three insurance companies, Phatra Insurance, Muang Thai Insurance and Muang Thai Life Assurance.

The name Lamsam is an alias invented by Ung Miao Ngian, based on an encounter he had back in China. While journeying alone, he encountered a group of bandits, whose leader asked, "You in the blue shirt, are you the third son of the Ungs?" To which he answered yes. The leader then told the bandits, "Làm sâm here is known to be a charitable person. Let him pass safely." Ung adopted the name the bandit called him—làm (藍) means 'blue', the colour he was wearing, and sâm might have referred to 衫 'shirt' or 三 'three', for him being the third son—as a token of good fortune, and members of the family from the third generation have used it as their Thai surname. The word lamsam has since entered Thai colloquial usage, meaning 'rich'.

== People ==
People with the surname Lamsam include:

- Banthoon Lamsam (born 1953), Thai business executive, grandson of Choti
- Banyong Lamsam (born 1933), Thai senior banker, son of Choti
- Choti Lamsam (1879–1948), founder of Kasikornbank, grandson of Ung Miao Ngian
- Nualphan Lamsam (born 1966), President and CEO of Muang Thai Insurance, granddaughter of Chulin
- Robyn Lamsam (born 1977), Hong Kong swimmer
- Roy Lamsam (born 1980), Hong Kong cricketer
- Thita Lamsam (born 2000), Thai figure skater
