= Banyong Lamsam =

Thai banker

Banyong Lamsam (born 1933) is a senior banker in Thailand. He is the former chairman of Kasikornbank PLC (formerly known as Thai Farmers Bank), director of Com-Link Company Limited, director of Bangkok Inter-Continental Hotels and director of Industrial Finance Corporation of Thailand PLC. He is third son of Choti Lamsam, founder of Kasikornbank. The former chairman Bancha Lamsam is Banyong's elder brother. He graduated from Chiang Mai University and the University of New Mexico.
