= The Rebel Billionaire: Branson's Quest for the Best =

- Genre: Reality television
- Written by: Tod Dahlke; Laura Fuest; Lori Levin-Hyams
- Directed by: Leslie Garvin; Sean Travis
- Presented by: Richard Branson
- Opening theme: "Live and Let Die" by Butch Walker
- Country of origin: United States
- Original language: English
- No. of seasons: 1
- No. of episodes: 13

Production
- Executive producers: Richard Branson; Tod Dahlke; Laura Fuest; Kevin Lee; Lori Levin-Hyams; Jonathan Murray
- Producers: Tess Gamboa; Denise Alvarado; Darren Roth; Dave Neglia; Jeff Schmidt; Bechara 'Bicha' Gholam; Danny Kon; Farzin Toussi
- Cinematography: Mark Jungjohann; Marc McCrudden
- Editors: Chris Collins; James Gavin Bedford; Larry Druker; Todd R. Lewis; Matt McCartie; Jeff Savenick; Joe Shugart
- Production company: Bunim/Murray Productions

Original release
- Network: Fox
- Release: November 9, 2004 – January 11, 2005

The Rebel Billionaire: Branson's Quest for the Best is a reality show for Fox's 2004–05 season.

== Premise ==
The premise for the series was that billionaire Richard Branson, founder of the Virgin Group, challenges 16 contestants to tasks that will prove to him which is most qualified to take over as president of Virgin. This format is strongly derivative of popular NBC reality show The Apprentice, though as well as business-related tasks it also incorporated many tough physical challenges, reflecting Branson's love of daredevil stunts. Each week also saw the contestants travel to a different country, whereas The Apprentice is just situated in one area. Shawn Nelson was the winner.

== Presentation ==
The one-hour show premiered on November 9, 2004 on the Fox network, and aired 12 episodes through January 2005. Although the show had over 5.5 million viewers, it was considered a ratings disappointment for American television prime-time programming. The show found ratings success internationally though, airing in 19 countries around the world, ranking as the #1 show in many countries where Richard Branson does business. The Rebel Billionaire also reran on the Fox Reality Channel.

== Contestants ==
(as they appeared on the show & in order of elimination)

Contestant	Occupation
Shawn Nelson (Winner)	Founder of LoveSac Corporation
Sara Blakely	Founder of Spanx, Inc.
Heather Maclean	Founder of Little Laureate Inc.
Gabriel Baldinucci	Real Estate Investor
Erica Vilardi	Model
Nicole Harvat	Labor Attorney
Candida Tolentino	Founder of Earth Cafe Living Foods
Steve Berke	Real Estate Manager/Tennis Pro
Jessica McCann	Former Owner of Sales Company
Michael Zindell	Wall Street Strategist
Jermaine Jamison	Technology Sales Specialist/Motivational Speaker
Sam Heshmati	Financial Analyst
Jennifer Grinspan	Radio Station Advertising Manager
Tim Hudson	Trial Attorney
Aisha Krump	Pharmaceutical sales representative
Spencer	Car Salesman

== Broadcasting ==
Country	Broadcaster
Australia	Channel Seven
Belgium	Plug TV
Brazil	FX
Canada	Global TV
China	International Channel Shanghai
Egypt	OTV
Estonia	TV3
Hong Kong	TVB Pearl
Kenya	KTN
Latvia	TV3
Lithuania	TV3
Malaysia	8TV
New Zealand	TV3
Philippines	Studio 23
South Africa	MNET Series
Sweden	TV8 (Broadcast during the end of 2007 and again from March 2009)
Turkey	FX
United Kingdom	ITV2
United States	Fox
Venezuela	FX
