= Shawn David Nelson =

American entrepreneur (born 1977)

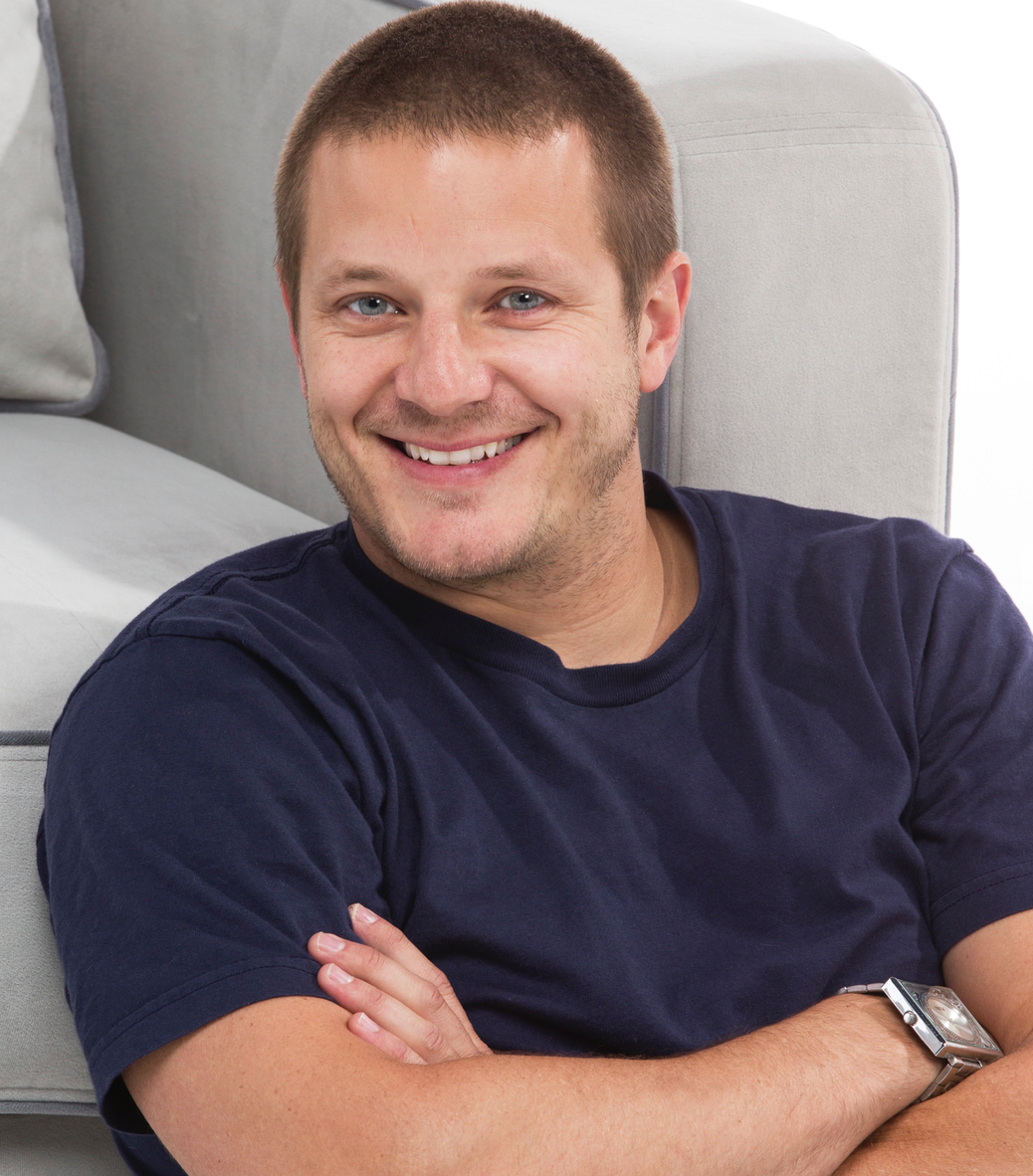
- Shawn David Nelson in 2014
- Born: October 29, 1977 (age 48); Utah, U.S.
- Education: University of Utah
- Occupation: Entrepreneur
- Known for: Founded the furniture company LoveSac and appeared on The Rebel Billionaire and won a $1 million investment
- Spouse: Tiffany
- Children: 4

Shawn David Nelson (born October 29, 1977) is an American entrepreneur. He founded the furniture company LoveSac, originally based in Salt Lake City, Utah.

== Early life and education ==
Nelson was born in Utah on October 29, 1977. He graduated from the University of Utah.

== Career ==
In 1995, he made his first "not-bean bag" from shredded foam camp mattresses. Nelson founded LoveSac in 1998. He hired a few college friends who helped him produce the "sacs" until Limited Too ordered 12,000 Lovesacs.

Nelson obtained the requested fabric from a factory in China. He opened the first retail location in 2001.

On June 26, 2018, Shawn Nelson, Founder & CEO of LoveSac, Inc, announced its initial public offering and shares of the Company's stock began trading the following day on the Nasdaq under the ticker symbol “LOVE”.

== Recognition ==
Shawn won the Ernst & Young Entrepreneur of the Year award for the "Emerging Entrepreneur" category in 2003. Nelson also appeared on Young Entrepreneur Society in 2009.

In 2005, Nelson appeared on Richard Branson's The Rebel Billionaire and won a $1 million investment. He spent three months following the show as acting president of Virgin companies. Nelson expanded his company's products to include the only changeable sectional couch in the world.

He spoke at the Economy and You forum at Western Connecticut State University in 2015. Nelson earned his master's degree in strategic design and management from Parson's New School for Design in 2015. He also became a part-time instructor for the school. That same year, he appeared on the CNBC show Make Me a Millionaire Inventor.

In July 2015, Nelson gave the keynote address at the 40 Under 40 awards for Fairfield County, Connecticut.

== Personal life ==
Nelson resides in St. George, Utah, with his wife Tiffany and four children.
