= Talat Noi =

Coordinates: 13°44′0″N 100°30′50″E

Talat Noi ตลาดน้อย ตลาดน้อย 噠叻仔
- Khwaeng
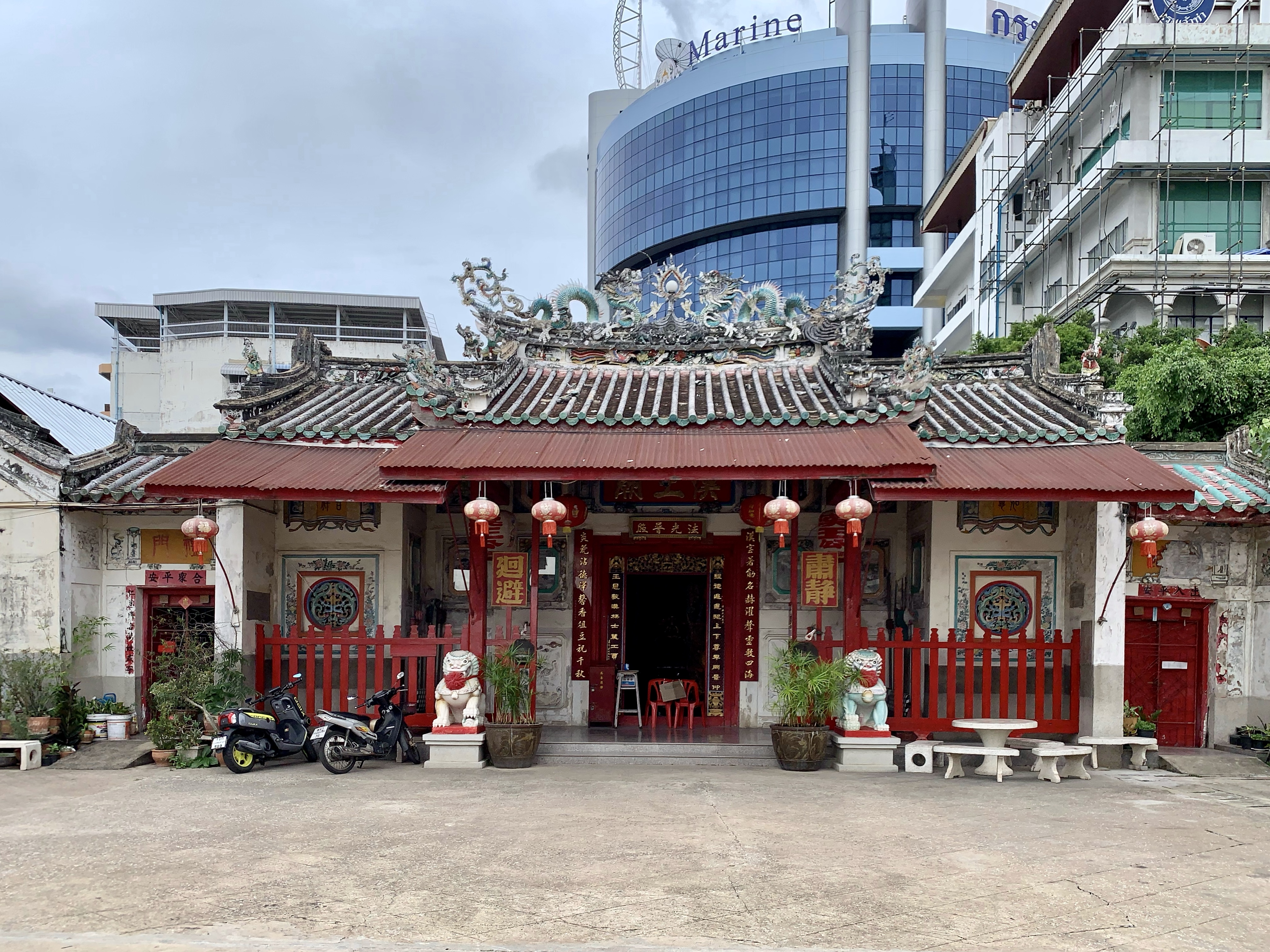
- Rong Kueak Shrine, a Hakka shrine on the riverfront at Talat Noi

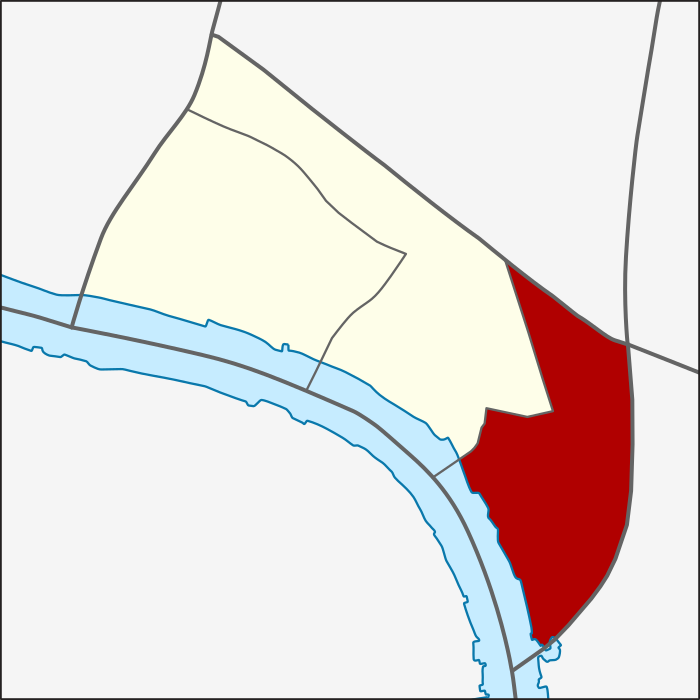
- Location in Samphanthawong District
- Country: Thailand
- Province: Bangkok
- Khet: Samphanthawong

Area
  - Total: 0.449 km^{2} (0.173 sq mi)

Population (2020)
  - Total: 6,865
  - Density: 15,300/km^{2} (39,600/sq mi)
- Time zone: UTC+7 (ICT)
- Postal code: 10100
- TIS 1099: 101303

Talat Noi or Talad Noi (Thai: ตลาดน้อย, pronounced [tā.làːt nɔ́ːj]; Chinese: 噠叻仔) is a historic riverside neighbourhood in Bangkok, Thailand, and a khwaeng (subdistrict) of Samphanthawong District. It occupies a low-lying strip on the eastern bank of the Chao Phraya River immediately south of Bangkok's Chinatown, and covers about 0.449 square kilometres.

Talat Noi grew in the early Rattanakosin period as a southward extension of the Sampheng market quarter, and it has been settled continuously by ethnic Chinese communities since the last decades of the eighteenth century. Its population has been unusually mixed for a Bangkok neighbourhood: Hokkien, Hakka, Hainanese and Teochew Chinese settled alongside Portuguese Catholics and Vietnamese refugees, and each group founded its own place of worship in an area of only a few streets.

For much of the nineteenth century the neighbourhood was a working port district dominated by the junk trade, and in the twentieth century it became the birthplace of Thailand's second-hand engine and automotive parts trade, known as Sieng Kong. Since the 2010s Talat Noi has been reinterpreted as a heritage and cultural tourism destination, a shift that has brought cafés, galleries and large numbers of visitors into a neighbourhood whose resident population is small, elderly and declining.

== Etymology ==
The Thai name means "little market". Scholarly accounts derive it from the Chinese name for the district, rendered in Thai as Talak Kia or Talakkia (ตะลัคเกียะ, Chinese: 噠叻仔), used by Chinese residents for the newer and smaller market that developed to the south of the much larger Sampheng market, then the commercial centre of early Bangkok. Because it lay so close to Sampheng, Talat Noi was at times treated as simply a part of it.

The Chinese name survives in local usage. The community market held at the Talat Noi Museum, for example, is called the Talakkia Friendly Market. A separate local tradition, repeated in popular guides, instead traces the name to a woman called Noi, said to be the daughter of a wealthy Chinese landowner in the area; this account is not supported by the historical literature on the district.

== Geography ==
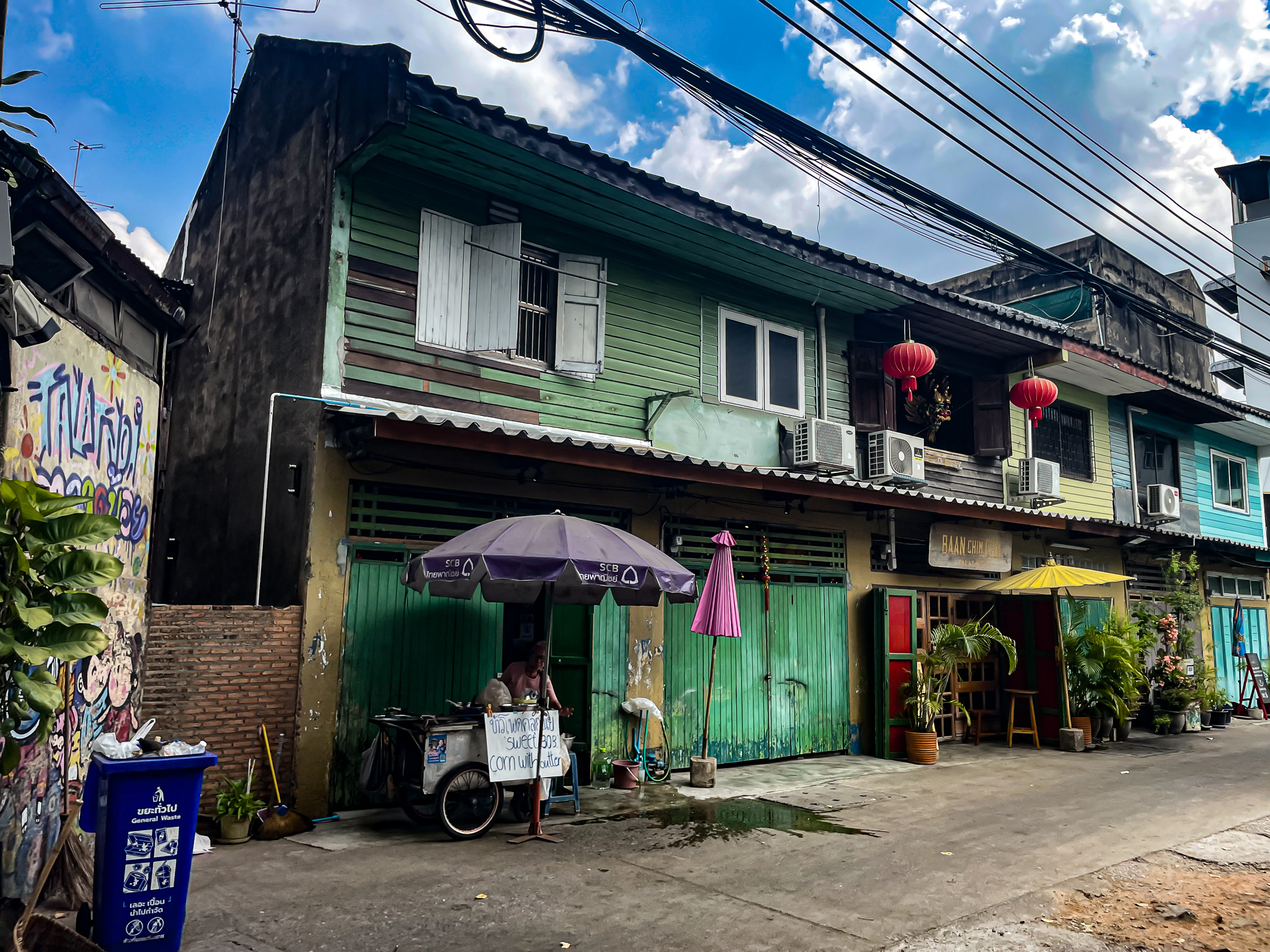
Street in Talat Noi

Talat Noi Subdistrict lies on the eastern (Phra Nakhon) bank of the Chao Phraya River, at the southern edge of Samphanthawong, the smallest of Bangkok's fifty districts. It is bounded roughly by Charoen Krung Road and Soi Phanurangsi to the east and north, by Khlong Phadung Krung Kasem and Bang Rak District to the south and east, and by the river to the west.

The area's street pattern reflects its origins as a riverside trading settlement. Two long thoroughfares run roughly parallel to the river: Song Wat Road, laid out under King Chulalongkorn after fires in Sampheng, and Charoen Krung Road, Bangkok's first paved road. Between them lies a dense network of alleys, of which Soi Wanit 2 (the continuation of the lane known further north as Sampheng), Trok Talat Noi (Soi Charoen Krung 22) and Soi Chao Sua Son are the principal routes. Before Charoen Krung Road reached the area, movement and commerce here depended almost entirely on the river.

== History ==
=== Settlement after the fall of Ayutthaya ===
The earliest permanent settlement in the area dates from the years after the fall of Ayutthaya in 1767, when refugee communities moved downriver and established themselves around the new capital. The Portuguese Catholics of Ayutthaya settled in two groups. One followed Father Jacques Corre to the western bank at Kudi Chin, where they built Santa Cruz Church. A second group, in dispute with French clergy over the leadership of that congregation, crossed to the eastern bank and settled in what is now Talat Noi. Their church stood close to an execution ground beside the cemetery of Wat Takhian, now Wat Maha Phruettharam, and they named it after Calvary, the site of the Crucifixion. The Thai rendering of that name, Kalawari, was eventually corrupted to Kalawa or Kalawan, and the church is still commonly called Wat Kalawa. The first, wooden church on the site was completed in 1787; it is known today as the Holy Rosary Church.

After King Rama I moved the capital to the eastern bank in 1782, Chinese households from Kudi Chin and from the banks of Khlong Bang Luang moved into Talat Noi, then still an outlying area beyond the walled city. The first of these appear to have been Hokkien, who built the Chow Sue Kong Shrine, the oldest shrine in the neighbourhood, recorded as founded in 1804.

Vietnamese refugees arrived at almost the same time. When Nguyen Anh, known in Thai sources as Ong Chiang Sue, took refuge in Siam in the 1780s, Rama I granted his followers land south of the city. The community built an Annam Nikaya temple there, formally Wat Uphai Ratchabamrung and universally known as Wat Yuan Talat Noi.

=== The junk trade and the Po Seng port ===
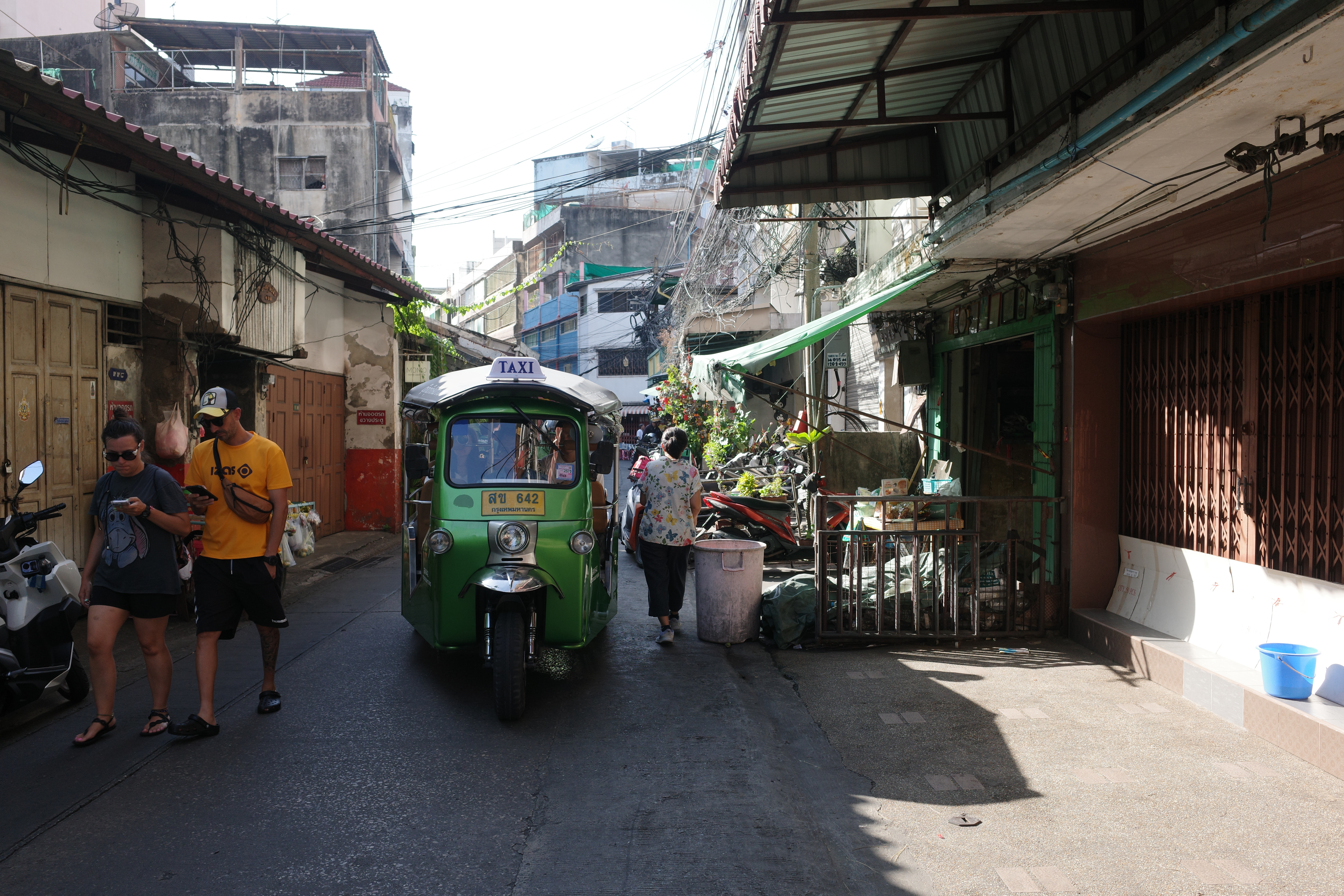
Talat Noi is a popular tourist destination

The growth of Talat Noi was closely tied to the boom in the Chinese junk trade in the first half of the nineteenth century, when the Siamese state allowed nobles, officials and wealthy commoners to trade relatively freely. A number of Chinese merchants who prospered in this trade entered the nobility through the Krom Tha, the department of ports and foreign trade. Among them was Phra Aphai Wanit, a Hokkien merchant of the family later granted the surname Posayachinda, whose Po Seng wharf at Talat Noi was operating by the reign of Rama II at the latest. He received a royal grant of riverside land and built a group of Chinese buildings on it, the residence among them being the house known as So Heng Tai.

Po Seng dealt chiefly in medicinal herbs brought up from southern Siam, and passed to Phra Aphai Wanit's son, Luang Aphai Wanit (Son). The Bowring Treaty of 1855 opened Siam to Western shipping, and square-rigged vessels and steamships steadily displaced the junks. Some Chinese merchants adapted by moving into tax farming; the Po Seng operation did not, and it wound down, closing at about the time of Luang Aphai Wanit's death in 1894. On the opposite bank stood the rival Huay Chung Long steamship wharf of Phraya Phisan Suphaphon (Chuen), founder of the Phisanbutr family, later sold to Tan Lip Buay of the Wanglee family.

While the wharves prospered, Talat Noi filled with migrant labour and became as densely built up as Sampheng and Ratchawong to the north. The variety of the migrants is visible in the number of shrines founded here in the nineteenth century by Teochew, Hokkien, Hainanese and Hakka groups, and in the Chinese Catholic congregation that gathered at the Holy Rosary Church.

In a 2015 study of the neighbourhood, the historian Poom Putimahtama argued that the Chinese of Talat Noi developed in distinct waves: Hokkien and Hakka settlers first drove the local economy, followed by Hainanese who invigorated trade after Siam opened to foreign commerce, while the Teochew presence in the area was concentrated at the Holy Rosary Church and was largely Chinese Catholic. On this account the district was significant not only commercially but also as a base for Catholic missionary work in Bangkok and the provinces, and for the founding of Chinese schools and charitable associations that prefigured modern urban welfare institutions.

=== Ironworking and the rise of Sieng Kong ===
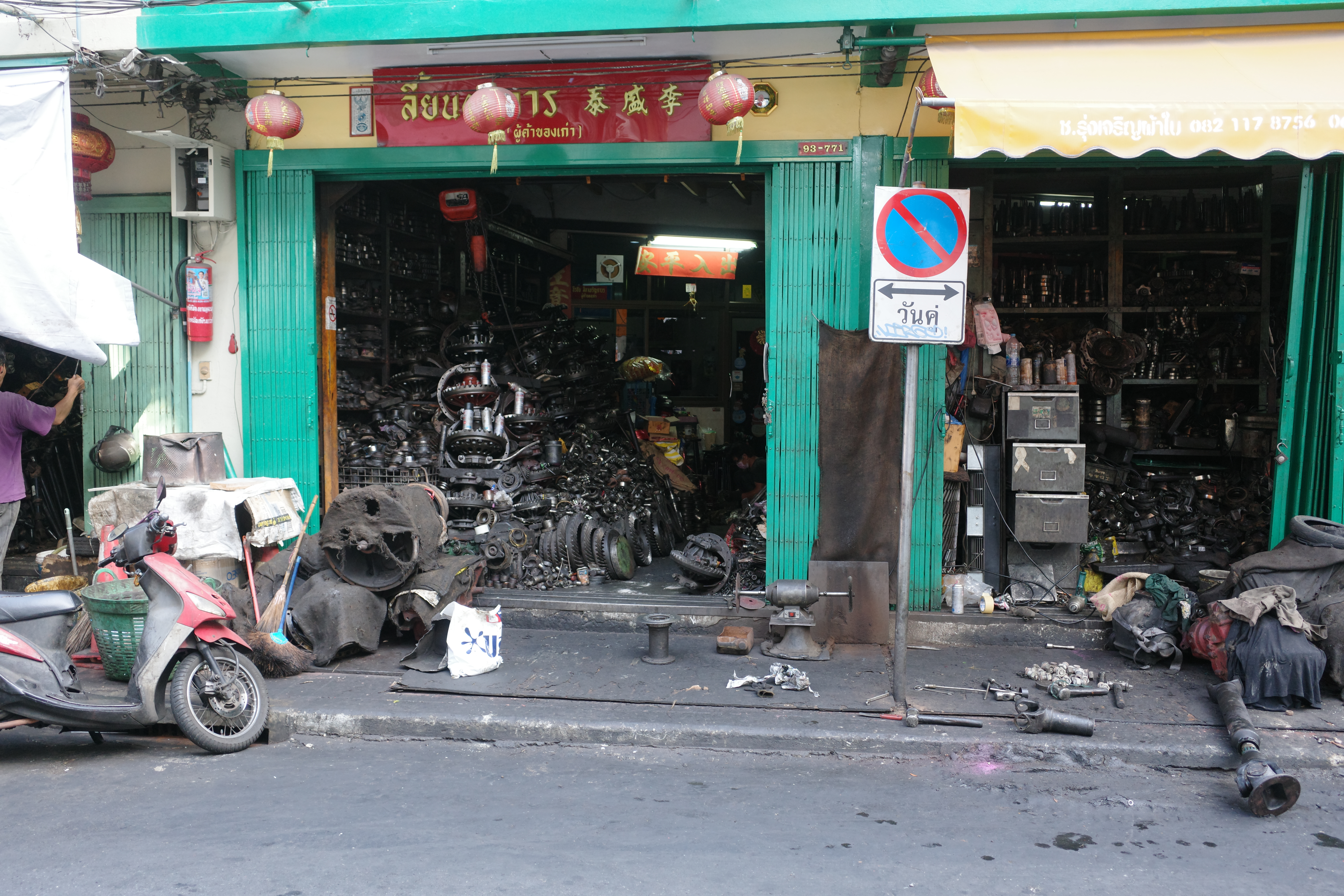
Shops selling second-hand engine and machine parts, the trade known as Sieng Kong

Chinese migrants skilled in metalwork settled in Talat Noi in large numbers, and the district became known for its ironmongers. Ocean-going ships calling at the wharves sold off serviceable surplus parts here, and local smiths were hired to forge anchors and chains. Hakka residents in particular appear to have specialised in ironwork, a specialisation preserved in the name of their shrine, Rong Kueak, understood locally as a reference to the making of horseshoes.

The trade expanded sharply after the Second World War, when large quantities of vehicles and equipment abandoned by both Allied and Axis forces became available as scrap. Because most of the metalworking shops stood near the Hokkien shrine of Sieng Kong, the name attached itself to the trade, and Sieng Kong became the general Thai term for a dealer in second-hand engines and machine parts. Talat Noi was for decades the largest such market in Thailand, and although the number of shops has fallen, workshops stacked with engines, gearboxes and axles remain one of the neighbourhood's defining sights.

=== Decline and revival ===
From the mid-twentieth century the relocation of Bangkok's port facilities downriver, repeated fires and the general movement of families to the suburbs steadily emptied the neighbourhood. Younger residents left, houses stood shut, and by the 2010s the community was among the most elderly in Bangkok.

Renewed interest began in the 2010s. Creative businesses took shophouses that were cheaper and quieter than those in Yaowarat, and residents organised to press the Bangkok Metropolitan Administration for infrastructure improvements and conservation support. A Talat Noi Development Group of some twenty-five residents was formed in 2014 and ran markets, a vegetarian festival and cycling tours; a separate group, Khon Rak Talat Noi ("People Who Love Talat Noi"), worked on documenting and preserving local culture.

== Religion and community institutions ==
Talat Noi contains an unusual concentration of religious buildings for its size, each associated with a particular community.

- Chow Sue Kong Shrine (ศาลเจ้าโจวซือกง), also known as Wat Sun Heng Yi, is the oldest shrine in the neighbourhood, founded in 1804 by Hokkien settlers and dedicated to the deified monk Cheng Chui Cho Su Kong. It remains a focus of the annual vegetarian festival in the district.
- Rong Kueak Shrine (ศาลเจ้าโรงเกือก), also called Hon Wong Kung, is a Hakka shrine standing directly on the riverbank within what was a predominantly Hokkien village. A stone tablet inside, dated to the fifteenth year of the Guangxu reign (1889), records that Hakka merchants had brought the image of the deity from China more than a century earlier, and that in 1888 a committee of Hakka merchants raised subscriptions to buy the adjoining riverside plot for 2,400 baht in order to build the present shrine. Phraya Choduek Ratchasetthi (Thian Chotikasathian), head of the Krom Tha Sai and himself Hakka, presided over its construction; an adjacent building that now houses an image of the god of wealth was originally his pumping station, which supplied piped water to Chinese households in Sampheng and Talat Noi.
- Holy Rosary Church (วัดแม่พระลูกประคำ), or Wat Kalawa, is the parish church founded by the Portuguese in 1787. The present Gothic Revival building, the third on the site, was erected in the 1890s. As the original Portuguese congregation dispersed, Chinese, Vietnamese and Cambodian Catholics came to make up most of the parish.
- Wat Uphai Ratchabamrung (วัดอุภัยราชบำรุง), known as Wat Yuan Talat Noi and in Vietnamese as Chua Khanh Van, is one of the oldest Annam Nikaya temples in Bangkok. Built by the Vietnamese community settled here under Rama I, it later received the patronage of King Mongkut and King Chulalongkorn, and long served Chinese Mahayana worshippers as well as Vietnamese ones.
- Wat Pathum Khongkha Ratchaworawihan, a royal Buddhist temple of Ayutthaya-period origin, stands at the northern edge of the subdistrict and retains murals restored in the reign of Rama III.

== Architecture and heritage buildings ==
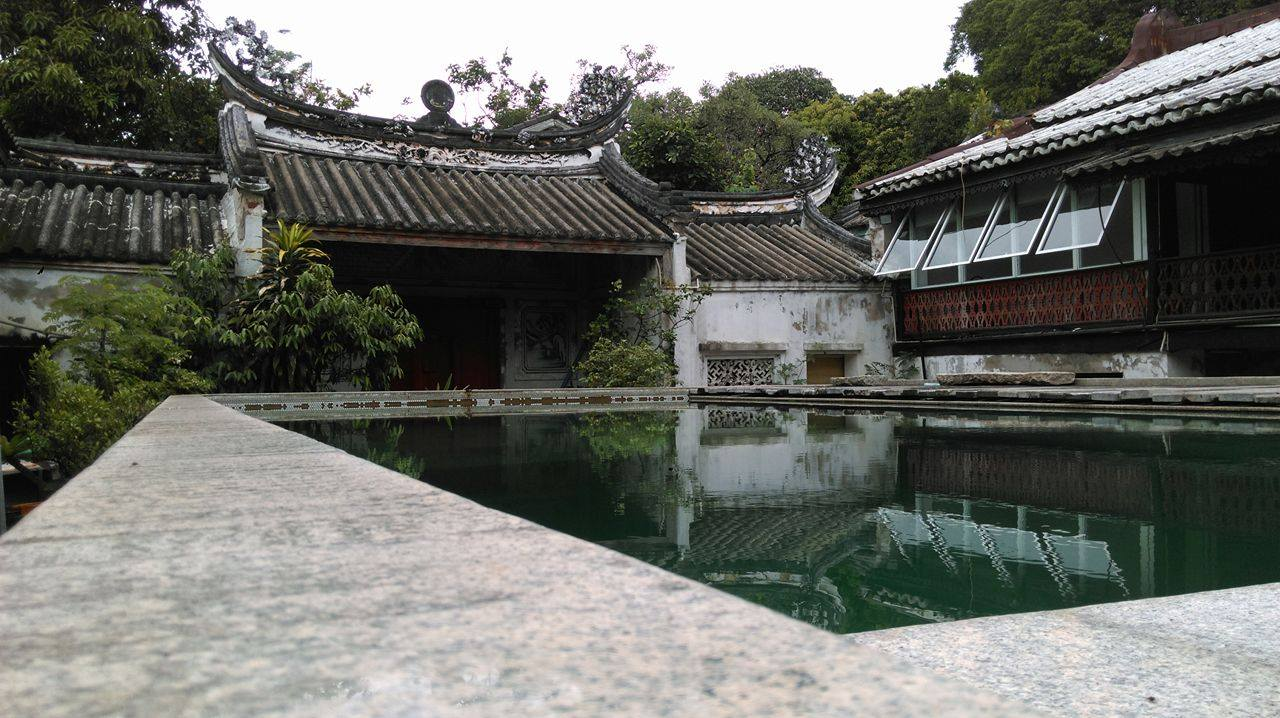
The So Heng Tai Mansion, one of the last traditional Chinese courtyard houses in Bangkok

The So Heng Tai Mansion (บ้านโซวเฮงไถ่) is the best known building in Talat Noi and one of the last traditional Chinese courtyard houses in Bangkok. It was built for Phra Aphai Wanit of the So clan, a Hokkien bird's nest tax farmer whose descendants received the surname Posayachinda under King Rama VI, and consists of four timber ranges around a central courtyard. It has remained in the same family for around eight generations. Maintenance has been funded largely by the owners, and in 2004 a four-metre-deep pool was installed in the courtyard so that the house could operate as a diving school, an adaptation that keeps the building in use and helps meet its upkeep costs.

The Talat Noi branch of the Siam Commercial Bank stands on the riverbank beside the Holy Rosary Church. The bank began in 1904 as an experimental venture called the Book Club, founded by Prince Mahisara Rachaharuthai, and received its royal charter in January 1907 (1906 in the Thai reckoning then in use), making it the first Thai-owned commercial bank. Its Talat Noi office, designed by the Italian architect Annibale Rigotti in a Beaux-Arts manner and built in 1908 or 1910, was the bank's first permanent branch and is the oldest bank branch still operating in Thailand. It received an ASA Architectural Conservation Award in 1982 and was renovated in 1995.

The Talat Noi Museum (พิพิธตลาดน้อย) occupies a converted lathe and machine workshop at 722/2 Song Wat Road, near Phanurangsi Pier. Operated by the Treasury Department, it presents the history of the community and of the Sieng Kong trade, and functions as a public meeting space and venue for the monthly Talakkia Friendly Market. Its building received an award for contemporary architecture from the Association of Siamese Architects in 2019.

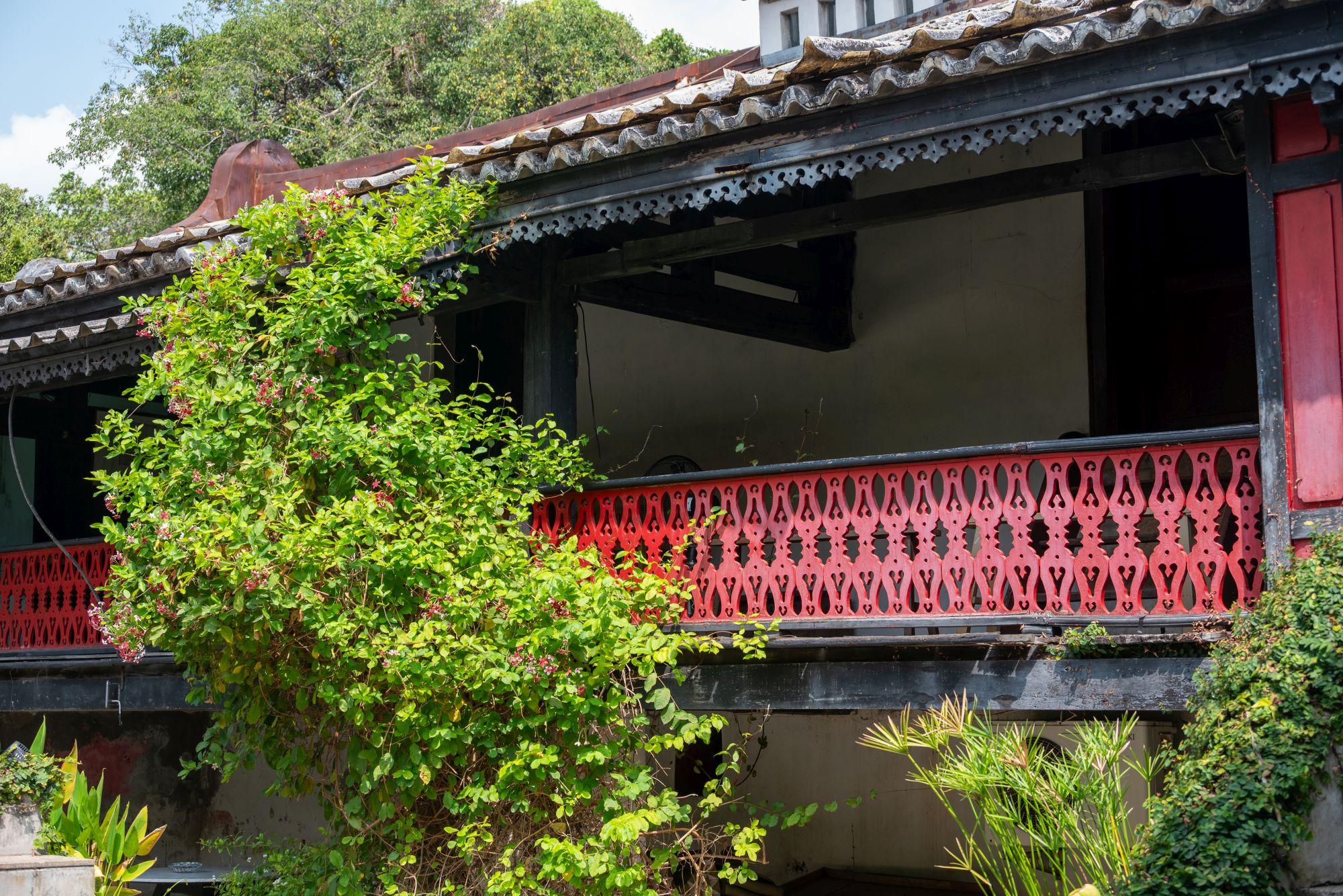
Carved detail on an old Chinese house in Talat Noi

Beyond these landmarks, the neighbourhood retains long runs of one- and two-storey timber shophouses and Chinese-style brick buildings, many of them in poor condition and none protected by registration as ancient monuments.

== Culture ==
=== Food ===
Talat Noi is generally credited as the birthplace of kuaitiao khua kai (ก๋วยเตี๋ยวคั่วไก่), wide rice noodles dry-fried with chicken and egg and served on lettuce. Unlike most Thai noodle dishes, which adapt Chinese recipes, kuaitiao khua kai is regarded as a Bangkok original that emerged in the neighbourhood around the time of the Second World War, developed by Chinese migrants from a dry version of chicken congee.

=== Festivals ===
The Chinese festival calendar remains central to community life. The vegetarian festival is observed at Chow Sue Kong Shrine, and the neighbourhood also marks Chinese New Year and the zongzi festival with community events, several of them now organised jointly with the Talat Noi Museum.

=== Street art ===
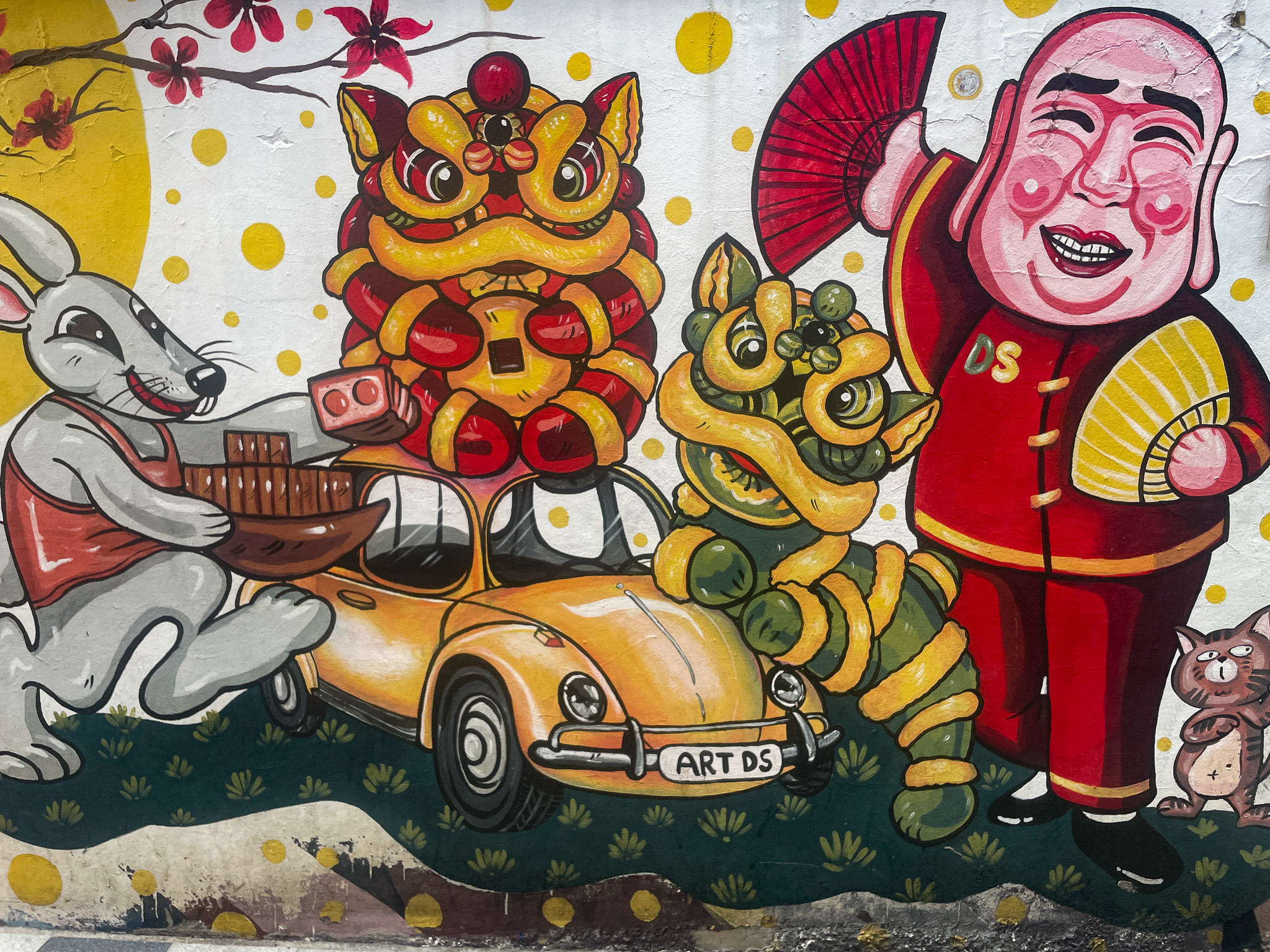
Murals in a Talat Noi lane

Murals became a defining feature of the district after the Bukruk Urban Arts Festival brought Thai and European artists to Talat Noi, Charoen Krung Road and Song Wat Road in January 2016. In 2020 the Tourism Authority of Thailand commissioned a further mural, the Amazing Thailand Phoenix Wall, in Soi Chao Sua Son, in part as a response to residents' complaints that visitors were damaging the walls of their houses; the painting was intended both to attract and to manage the flow of photographers through the lane.

=== The Optimus Prime statue ===
A life-sized figure of the Transformers character Optimus Prime, assembled from scrap metal by a local craftsman, was installed at the Khao Lam roundabout in late 2024 as a landmark intended to draw visitors. In February 2025 it acquired an unexpected devotional following after a nearby bar owner made an offering of engine oil to it and publicised the resulting upturn in business. Videos of the offerings circulated widely, crowds began leaving gifts at the statue, and one restaurateur hired traditional dancers to perform in front of it in fulfilment of a vow. District authorities discouraged the practice.

== Tourism and conservation ==
Talat Noi is now one of the most visited historic neighbourhoods in Bangkok, promoted for its shrines, shophouses, murals and riverside cafés, and easily combined with Chinatown and the adjoining Bang Rak neighbourhood on Charoen Krung Road, where the Old Customs House, General Post Office and Assumption Cathedral stand. Song Wat Road, which runs partly through the subdistrict, was ranked thirty-ninth in Time Out's 2023 list of the world's forty coolest neighbourhoods, a listing that accelerated interest in the wider area.

The transformation has been contested. Residents and heritage groups have argued that recognition has arrived without the infrastructure, funding or legal protection needed to keep old buildings standing, and that rising values and tourist pressure risk displacing precisely the working community that gives the district its character. Owners of significant houses have described maintenance as an expense borne almost entirely by families, in a city with few protections for privately owned historic architecture.

== Demographics ==
The subdistrict recorded a registered population of 6,865 in 2020 across 0.449 square kilometres. Samphanthawong as a whole is the smallest and least populous of Bangkok's districts and has the highest proportion of elderly residents in the city, a pattern reflected in Talat Noi, where many households consist of older Thai Chinese residents whose children have moved elsewhere.

== Notable people ==
- Puey Ungphakorn (1916–1999), economist, Bank of Thailand governor and rector of Thammasat University, was born in Talat Noi into a Thai Chinese family of modest means and raised by his mother after his father's early death.
- The Posayachinda family, descendants of Phra Aphai Wanit, have owned the So Heng Tai Mansion since the nineteenth century and have been prominent in the neighbourhood's commercial and civic life.

== Transport ==
Talat Noi is served by Hua Lamphong MRT station on the Blue Line, about 900 metres from the entrance to Soi Charoen Krung 22, and by several Chao Phraya Express Boat piers, including Marine Department and Si Phraya. Charoen Krung Road carries bus services along the eastern edge of the neighbourhood.

== See also ==
- Kudi Chin, a Thai-Chinese-Portuguese community of similar origin in Thonburi
- Sieng Kong
- Song Wat Road
- Sampheng
