= Lhong 1919 =

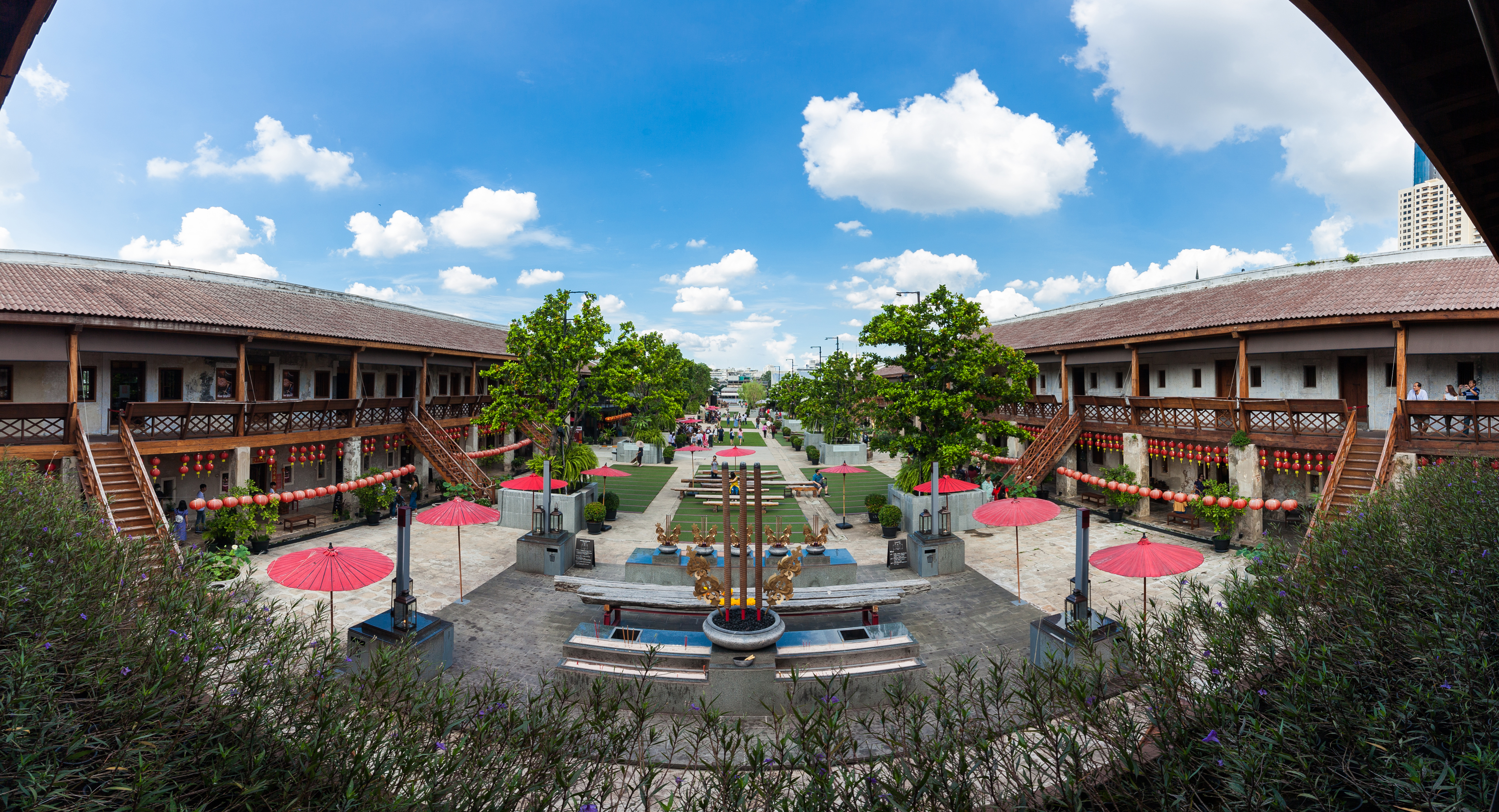
- Lhong 1919 from Mazu shrine
- Location: Khlong San District, Bangkok, Thailand
- Coordinates: 13.73429°N 100.50763°E
- Opened: November 2, 2017; 9 years ago
- Developer: Wanglee family
- Manager: Rujiraporn Wanglee
- Owner: Wanglee family
- Floor area: 6 rai (about 2.3 acres)
- Floors: 2
- Website: lhong1919.com

Lhong 1919 (Thai: ล้ง 1919; Chinese: 廊 1919) is a tourist attraction on the west bank of Chao Phraya River on Bangkok's Thonburi side. Its concept is similar to that of the Asiatique The Riverfront on the Phra Nakhon side. It is at the bottom of Chiang Mai Road, Khlong San Sub-District, Khlong San District, Bangkok, Thailand.

Lhong is a historic port and warehouse in siheyuan-style (Chinese courtyard architecture). It was built in 1850 as a port for overseas shipping from British Malaya, mainland China, and British Hong Kong by Phraya Pisansuphaphol (Chuen), a wealthy Thai Chinese. He was an ancestor of the Pisolyabutra family, whose descendants include Luang Sathonrachayut or Yom Pisolyabutra, who was the founder of Khlong Sathon and Sathon Road. The port's name is derived from the word Huang Chung Lhong (火船廊; lit: 'steamer port'), an old name.

In 1919, the Wanglee family acquired Lhong. In October 2016, the family started renovated Lhong as a tourist attraction and a new landmark of Khlong San and Tha Din Daeng areas. It was officially opened on 2 November 2017 with Kobkarn Wattanavrangkul Tourism and Sports Minister presiding with many celebrities—Sirikitiya Jensen, Nualphan Lamsam, Chadathip Jutrakul, Piyapas Bhirombhakdi—in attendance.

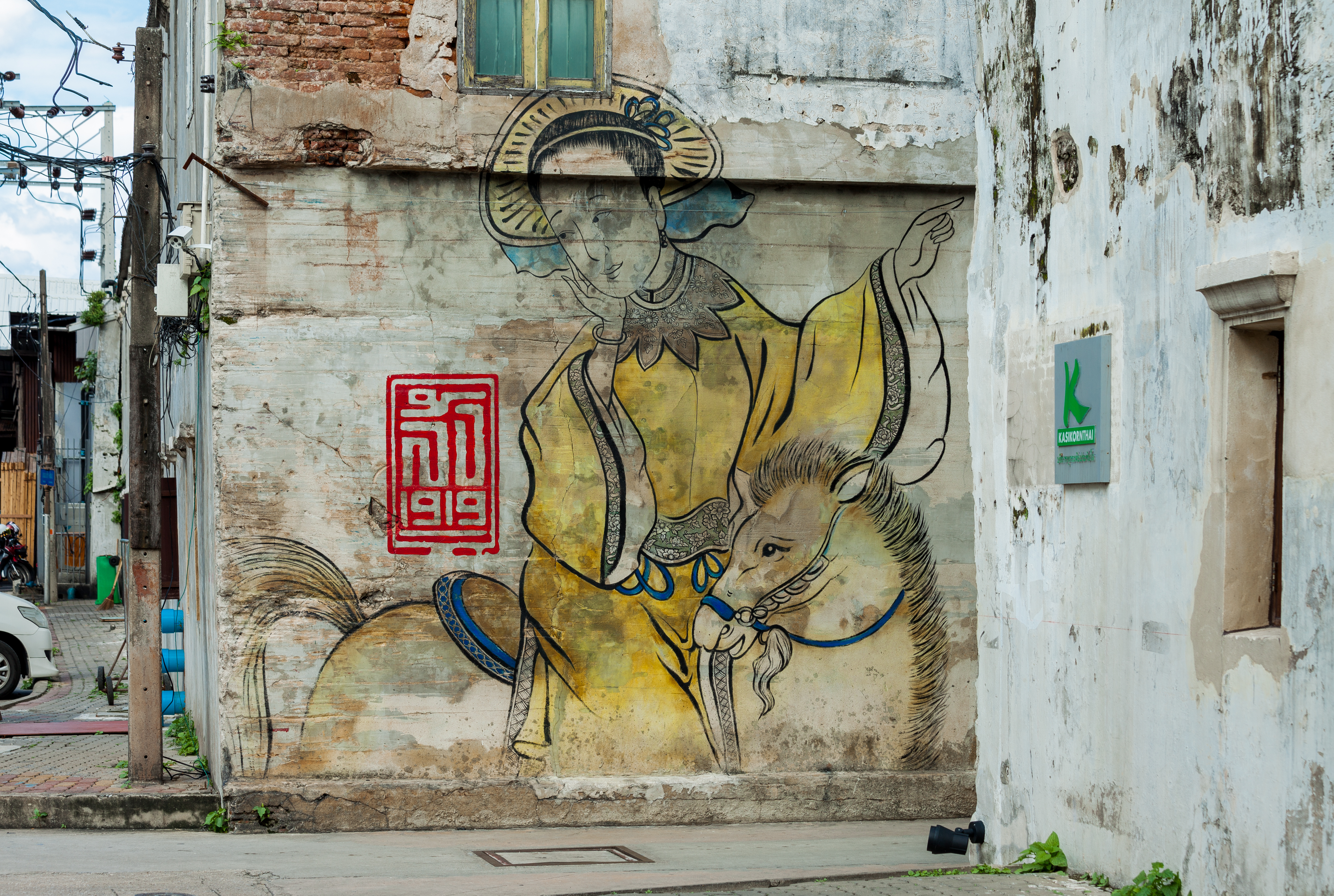
Chinese graffito on the entrance wall

Lhong 1919's amenities include cafés, art and craft shops, co-working space, and a Thai-Chinese history centre. The focal point of Lhong is the shrine to Mazu, goddess of the sea and maritime according to ancient Chinese beliefs. The area adjacent to the Chao Phraya River was converted in 2018 into an outdoor stage for theatrical performances.

== See also ==
- Wanglee House – adjoining old Chinese mansion
