= LoveSac =

American furniture retailer

The Lovesac Company
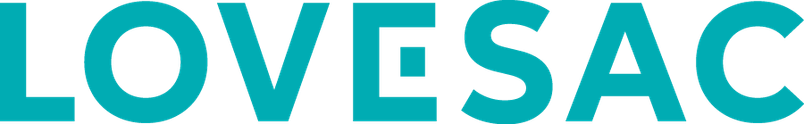
- Type: Public
- Traded as: Nasdaq: LOVE; Russell 2000 Index component
- Industry: Home Furnishings
- Founded: 1995; 31 years ago
- Founder: Shawn David Nelson
- Headquarters: Stamford, Connecticut, U.S.
- Key people: Shawn David Nelson (CEO & director)
- Products: Sactionals, Sacs, Accessories
- Revenue: ▲US$ 165.88 million (FY2019)
- Operating income: ▼US$ −7.04 million (FY2019)
- Net income: ▼US$ −6.7 million (FY2019)
- Total assets: ▲US$ 105 million (FY2019)
- Total equity: ▲US$ 78.97 million (FY2019)
- Number of employees: 257 (2019)
- Website: www.lovesac.com

The Lovesac Company is an American furniture retailer, specializing in a patented modular furniture system called Sactionals. Sactionals consist of two combinable pieces, “Seats” and “Sides,” as well as custom-fit covers and associated accessories. Lovesac also sells Sacs, a bag seat filled with a proprietary foam mixture.

== History ==
Lovesac was created in 1995 by Shawn D. Nelson, who formerly hand-made the chairs and delivered them to other students at the University of Utah. In 2005, Nelson won Fox's Rebel Billionaire reality show. The company relocated from Salt Lake City to Stamford, Connecticut in 2006, as it raised private-equity capital in the area. Lovesac joined the Nasdaq stock exchange on Wednesday, June 27, 2018, trading under the symbol LOVE.

In January 2006, the company filed for Chapter 11 bankruptcy protection. They left Chapter 11 protection in August 2006.

In 2012, Lovesac was named the fastest growing furniture company in the U.S. by Furniture Today magazine as well as recognized for being one of the top 100 furniture companies.

According to founder Shawn David Nelson, Lovesac planned to move 75% of its production out of China by 2020, due to trade war tariffs. As of late 2019, 40% of Lovesac's manufacturing was done in Vietnam and Malaysia, which were free of the tariff levels.

== Products ==
Sactionals are Lovesac's modular sectional couches.

Snugg Sofas, Loveseats, and Chairs offer Lovesac comfort and quality in a smaller (and simpler) footprint.

Sacs are premium bean bag chairs with proprietary filling (Durafoam).

PillowSac Chairs convert the PillowSac bean bag chair into a more structured accent chair.
