= Sieng Kong =

Neighborhood of Bangkok's Chinatown, Thailand

Coordinates: 13°43′59.67″N 100°30′45.61″E

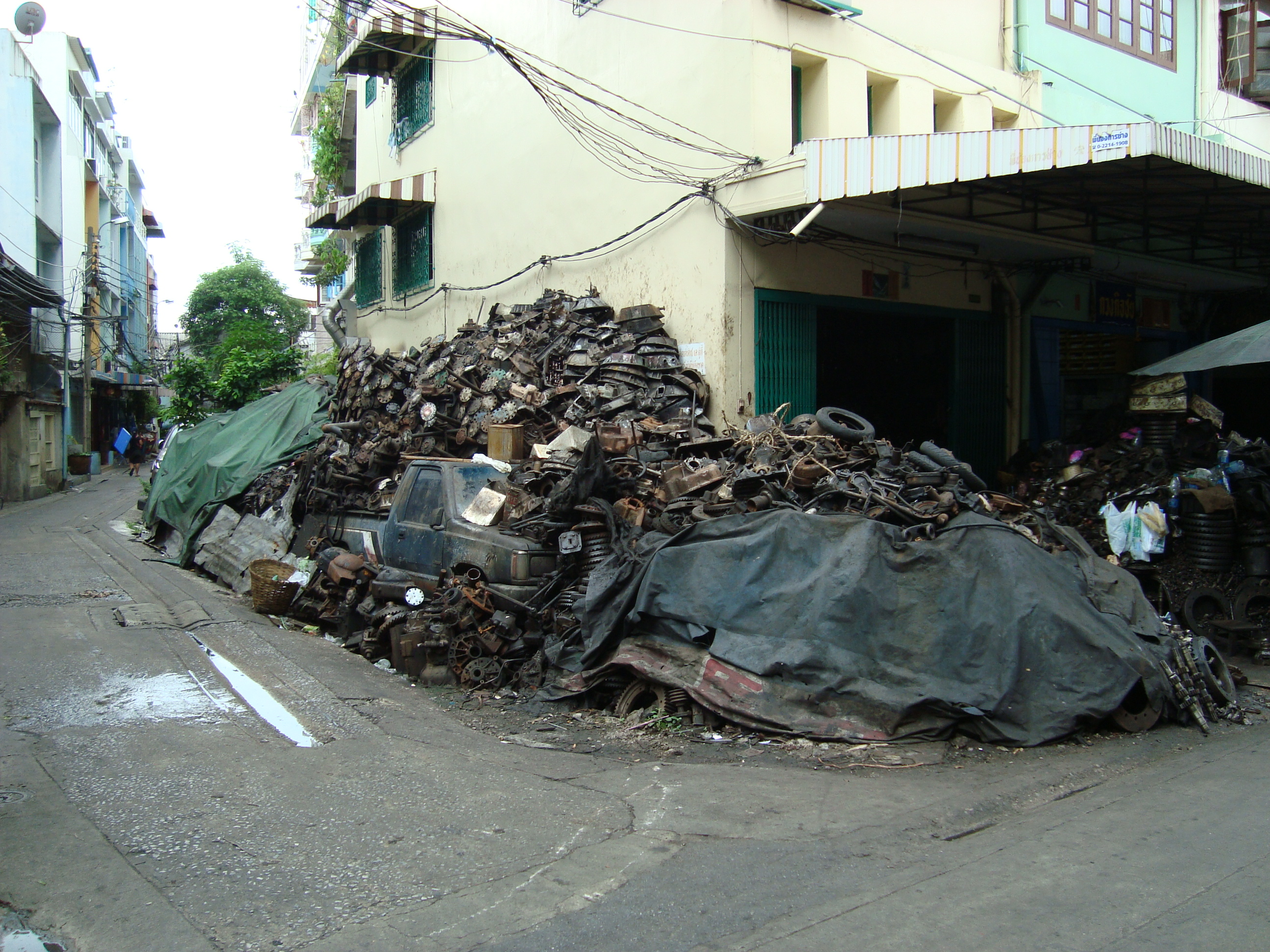
Sieng Kong in mid-2009 (the alley on the left is Soi Chao Sua Son, which leads to the historic Chinese mansion, So Heng Tai)

Sieng Kong, alternatively spelled Xiang Gong and Siang Kong (Thai: เซียงกง, pronounced [sīe̞ŋ kōŋ]; Chinese: 仙公; pinyin: Xiān gōng) is a neighbourhood in the area of Bangkok's Chinatown, Talat Noi sub-district, Samphanthawong district. It is well known to most Thais as the car part and second-hand engine machine center. It covers the area from Talat Noi, Song Wat to parts of Khao Lam, Tri Mit and Charoen Krung roads.

Its name, "Sieng Gong", came from a small joss house of the same name, located on Song Wat road near Charoen Krung road and what is now Odeon Circle. The original joss house was established in 1854 (the 4th year of the Xianfeng Emperor's reign in the Qing dynasty) by a group of Hoklo settlers in the area. In the past, the site was adjacent to a canal, which is why people often referred to the place as "Sieng Kong".

Indeed in Chinese term (Swatow dialect), ‘Sieng’ (仙) means "god" or "xian" and ‘Gong’ (公) means "leader". The meaning have nothing to do with the auto part business anyway. However, Sieng Gong was the birthplace of quality second-hand auto parts in Thailand, and its name has since been used by many other markets and businesses such as Sieng Kong Bang Na, Sieng Kong Chiang Mai, Sieng Kong Rangsit, Sieng Kong Nakhon Pathom.

The history of this place began during the Second World War period, when Chinese settlers gathered here to trade engine spare parts. It later became the first junkyard business hub in Thailand, and the trade has continued to grow to this day.

Now, it's officially known as Soi Wanit 2 (ซอยวานิช 2) in pair with Soi Wanit 1 or popularly known as Sampheng, a bustling shopping district nearby. It was promoted as part of Chinatown's walking street.
