= Banthoon Lamsam =

Thai businessman (born 1953)

- บัณฑูร ล่ำซำ
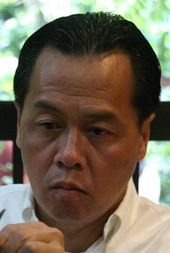
- Born: 15 January 1953 (age 73); Bangkok, Thailand
- Occupations: Chairman & CEO of Kasikornbank
- Spouse(s): Usa Chirapongse (1988-present)
- Children: Songkanda Lamsam; Korapat Lamsam; Naathapit Lamsam
- Parent(s): Bancha Lamsam (father); Thanphuying Sam-aungvarn Lamsam (mother)

Banthoon Lamsam (Thai: บัณฑูร ล่ำซำ; RTGS: Banthun Lamsam, or nicknamed Pan (ปั้น); Chinese: 伍萬通; born 15 January 1953 (2496 BE)) is a Thai business executive and the successor to the family business, Lamsam. He is the son of Bancha Lamsam and Thanphuying Sam-aungvarn Lamsam (maiden name Devakula; half-sister of M.R. Pridiyathorn Devakula). The Lamsam family is one of the wealthiest and most powerful families in Thailand. Bantoon is Lamsam 5th generation and heading family's banking and insurance flagship. He is currently the Chairman of the Board and Chief Executive Officer of Kasikornbank, the top financial service provider group in Thailand.

== Early life ==
Banthoon Lamsam was born on 15 January 1953, son of Bancha Lamsam and Thanphuying Sam-aungvarn Lamsam (maiden name Mom Rajawongse Sam-aungvarn Devakula; daughter of Prince Priditheppong Devakula and Mom Rajawongse Sa-ang Pramoj). Bantoon has two younger sisters. Bantoon is a grandson of Choti Lamsam who founded Kasikornbank in 1945 as Thai Farmers Bank. Banthoon graduated from Saint Gabriel's College and Srinakharinwirot University Prasarnmit Demonstration School. He studied at Phillips Exeter Academy from 1967 to 1971 before going on to earn a bachelor's degree in chemical engineering from Princeton University and a masters of business administration (MBA) from Harvard Business School (HBS).

After graduation, he spent two years with the military's Directorate of Joint Intelligence in the Ministry of Defence. In 1979, Banthoon joined Thai Farmers Bank (later changed to Kasikornbank) in the international banking department, where he was promoted to first vice president in 1986. In 1987 he moved to the domestic banking department as a senior vice president. In 1992, Banthoon was nominated president as of Thai Farmers Bank (TFB).

After the 1997 Asian financial crisis (known as วิกฤตต้มยำกุ้ง, literally translated as Tom Yam Kung crisis), he was the first to introduce the term "reengineering" to Thailand's banking industry. The Lamsam family became a minority shareholder of Kasikornbank. Banthoon Lamsam is an important contributor to the Democratic Party. Banthoon was skeptical of the country's economic policies during Pol. Lt. Col Thaksin Shinawatra's term as the prime minister of Thailand, and it was rumored that he had been approached by the Democratic Party for the position of the party leader in 2004.

In 2002, Banthoon became president and CEO of TFB. In 2003, he changed the logo and name of the bank from Thai Farmers Bank (TFB) to the current name, Kasikornbank (KBank), improvising Chinese characters style into the logo, "K". In 2010, after Dr. Prasarn Trairatvorakul, then the president of KBank, left to become the Governor of the Bank of Thailand, Banthoon assumed the role of both president and CEO of KBank. He also instituted a senior executive position called "domain coordinator" and nominated four executive vice presidents to assume the positions of business domain, risk domain, infrastructure domain, and resource domain. Two of these executives later became the presidents of KBank and the other two became board directors.

In May 2013, Banthoon published a 608-page novel, Sinaeha Montra Lanna, which he wrote in 13 months. The publisher printed 20,000 copies in the first two months.

Banthoon Lamsam's hobbies are playing the saxophone and canoeing. He is also feng shui believer.

== Current profession ==
- Chairman of the Board (2013) and Chief Executive Officer (since 1991), KASIKORNBANK PLC
- Director of Pukha Holdings, Pukha Realty, Pukha Go, Pukha Nanfa Hotel
- Chairman and Manager, Mahamakuta Rajavidyalaya Foundation under Royal Patronage
- Treasurer, Wat Bovoranives Vihara and Wat Nyanasamvararam Varamahavihara Buddhist Monasteries

== Work experience ==
1977 Directorate of Joint Intelligence, Ministry of Defense

1979 International Banking Department, Thai Farmers Bank

1986 First Vice President, International Banking Department, Thai Farmers Bank

1987 Senior Vice President, Domestic Banking Department, Thai Farmers Bank

1990 First Senior Vice President, Thai Farmers Bank

1991 Executive Vice President, Thai Farmers Bank

1992 President, Thai Farmers Bank

1998-2000 Chairman, Thai Bankers Association

2002 President and Chief Executive Officer, Thai Farmers Bank

2003 Chief Executive Officer, KASIKORNBANK PLC

2010 Chief Executive Officer and President, KASIKORNBANK PLC

2013 Chairman of the Board and Chief Executive Officer, KASIKORNBANK PLC

== Decorations ==
Banthoon has received the following royal decorations in the Honours System of Thailand:

- 2007 - Thutiya Chunlachomklao, The Most Illustrious Order of Chula Chom Klao, Knight Grand Commander (Second Class, Lower Grade)
- 2003 - Tatiya Chunlachomklao Wiset, The Most Illustrious Order of Chula Chom Klao, Grand Companion (Third Class, Upper Grade)

== Awards ==
2014 Business Person of the Year 2014 by Krungthep Turakij

2011 Asian Corporate Director Recognition Award 2011 by Corporate Gove

2010 THE QFC-ASIAN BANKER LEADERSHIP ACHIEVEMENT AWARD

2009 Banker of the Year, Money & Banking Magazine

2003 Best CEO 2003, Stock Exchange of Thailand Awards 2003

2000 Star of Asia, Business Week Magazine

1999 Banker of the Year, Interest Magazine

1999 Banker of the Year, Money & Banking Magazine

1998 Banker of the Year, Interest Magazine

1994 Banker of the Year, Money & Banking Magazine

== Other activities ==
- Chairman, Thai Bankers Association (1998-2000)
- Chairman and Manager of the Maha Makut Buddhist University Foundation
- Member of the Thai Red Cross Society Council
- Member of the Sai Jai Thai Foundation Committee
- Member of Sasin Graduate Institute of Business
- Administration Steering Board, Chulalongkorn University
- Abbot Assistant of Wat Bovornivesviharn, Kwang Bovornives Phra Nokorn, Bangkok
- Abbot Assistant of Wat Yannasangvararamvoramahaviharn, Huay Yai, Bang Lamung, Chonburi
- Ordained as a Buddhist monk for 3 months in 1977 at Wat Bovoranives Vihara
- Ordained as a Buddhist monk for 15 Days in 2004 at Wat Yansangwararam
