= Heather Maclean (author) =

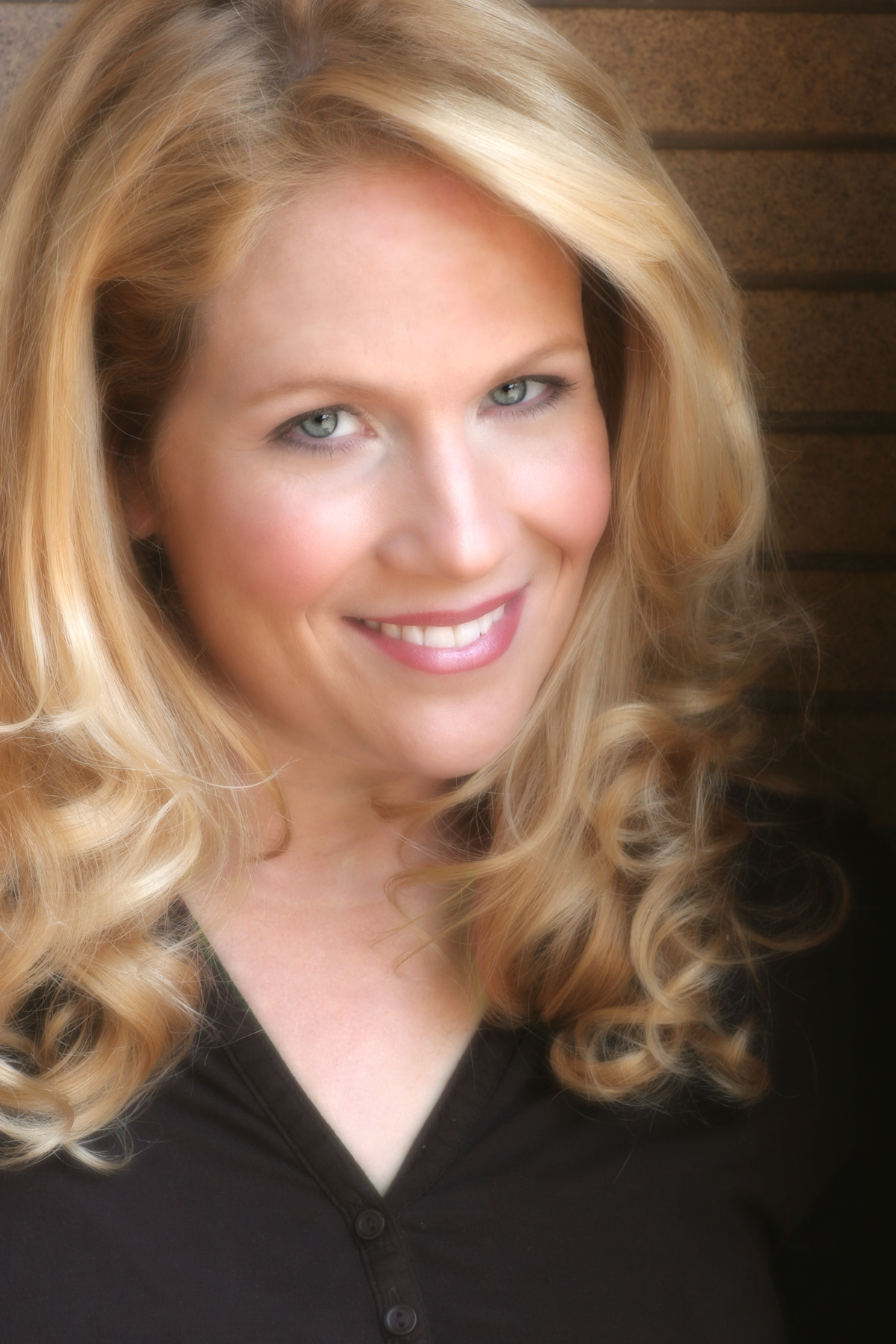
- Born: October 18, 1972 (age 54); St. Louis, Missouri
- Education: Princeton University
- Occupation: Author
- Website: www.heather-maclean.com

Heather Maclean (née Beach; born October 18, 1972) is a New York Times best-selling American author.

== Early life and education ==
Maclean was born Heather Beach on October 18, 1972, in St. Louis, Missouri. She graduated from Cor Jesu Academy in St. Louis in 1990. In 1994, she graduated from Princeton University with a Bachelor of Arts degree in English Literature.

At Princeton, she was the Publisher of Business Today. While in college, she was an intern at Entertainment Weekly magazine.

== Career ==
Maclean began her career at The Walt Disney Company where she co-created the Disneyland Resort's first Website, www.disneyland.com, produced the company's first international intranet Team Disney, and was the first person to answer Mickey Mouse's e-mail. Following Disney, she worked at Internet retailer Buy.com as the Director of Web Development.

In 2001, Maclean founded Little Laureate, a children's educational media production company. Little Laureate's DVDs were named one of the "Best Video Series of All Time" by Parents magazine.

== Writing ==
Maclean was first published under the name Heather Michelle Beach in 1990 when a speech she wrote for the Voice of Democracy broadcast scriptwriting contest, sponsored by the Veterans of Foreign Wars, was entered into the United States Congressional Record by Congressman Richard A. Gephardt.

Maclean's work has appeared in Condé Nast Traveler, Fit Pregnancy, New York Parent magazine and Princeton Alumni Weekly.

Maclean has written and edited 13 non-fiction books including science and business, parenting, inspirational, and food-related titles such as The Weight of the Nation for HBO. Four of Maclean's books have been on The New York Times Best Seller list. Visual Intelligence with Amy E. Herman was a bestseller in the "Science" category, while the Italian cookbooks Skinny Italian, Fabulicious!, and Fabulicious! Fast & Fit, all written with reality TV star Teresa Giudice, were bestsellers in the "Advice, How-To, and Miscellaneous" category.

Maclean's first fiction title Toward a Secret Sky, a YA adventure set in Scotland, was released by HarperCollins' Blink imprint in 2017.

== Television ==
Maclean starred with Richard Branson on the television show The Rebel Billionaire, which was broadcast on the Fox network in 2005. Maclean was one of the final contestants and appeared in every episode. Maclean also filmed the pilot episode for MTV's Road Rules with Mark Long and Shani Rosenzweig.

Maclean has been an on-air contributor to many news programs, including Good Morning America, the CBS Early Show, ABC News, Fox Business Network and ParentsTV. She has also guest-starred on Sirius XM Radio's Doctor Radio program.
