= Wanglee family =

Thai Chinese business family

Wanglee หวั่งหลี Saetan
- Parent family: Chen family
- Current region: Bangkok
- Origin: Guangdong, China
- Founded: 1871
- Founder: Tan Tsue Huang Saetan
- Connected families: Poshyananda family Lamsam family
- Estate: Wanglee House
- Properties: Lhong 1919; Future Park Rangsit

The Wanglee family (Thai: หวั่งหลี, from Chinese: 黌利) is a Thai family of Teochew Chinese descent. The family traces its origins to Tan Tsue Huang (陳慈黌, 1841–1920), of the Tan clan (陳, Chen in Mandarin), who arrived in Siam during the reign of King Mongkut (Rama IV, 1851–1868) and established a successful business during the second half of the nineteenth century. He used overseas family networks to maintain trade routes with Canton, Hong Kong, Singapore and Saigon, and later expanded into rice milling and insurance. Tan settled in Bangkok in 1871 and married a daughter of the Poshyananda family. His second son, Tan Lip Buay, inherited the business, which became one of Siam's largest rice millers and exporters by 1920.

Today, the family's Wanglee House is recognized as an award-winning historic building. The former port next door, which used to serve the family business, was renovated and opened as the cultural attraction Lhong 1919 in 2017.
