= Heather L. MacLean =

Canadian civil and systems engineer

Heather L. MacLean is a Canadian civil engineer and systems engineer whose research involves systems analysis for sustainable engineering, especially involving energy and transportation, and the use of bioenergy and alternative fuels. She is a professor in the Department of Civil & Mineral Engineering at the University of Toronto, the Canada Research Chair in Sustainable Systems and Technology Assessment, and vice dean for strategy in the University of Toronto Faculty of Applied Science & Engineering. She also holds joint appointments in the Department of Chemical Engineering & Applied Chemistry, School of Public Policy and Governance, and School of the Environment.

== Education and career ==
MacLean majored in civil engineering at the Technical University of Nova Scotia, now part of Dalhousie University, graduating in 1988. She went on to receive an MBA at the Saint Mary's University (Halifax) in 1990. Then, at Carnegie Mellon University, she received a master's degree in engineering and public policy in 1997, and completed a Ph.D. jointly in civil engineering and engineering and public policy in 1998.

She was awarded a tier 1 Canada Research Chair in Sustainable Systems and Technology Assessment in 2021.

== Recognition ==
MacLean is a Fellow of the Engineering Institute of Canada, elected in 2016, and a Fellow of the Canadian Academy of Engineering, elected in 2017.

She is the 2017 recipient of the Albert E. Berry Medal of the Canadian Society for Civil Engineering, and the 2019 Julian C. Smith Medal of the Engineering Institute of Canada.
