= Choti Lamsam =

Thai banker

Choti Lamsam (Chinese: 伍柏林; pinyin: Wǔ Bǎilín; Thai: โชติ ล่ำซำ; RTGS: Chot Lamsam) was a Thai businessman who founded the Kasikornbank or otherwise known as the Thai Farmers Bank in 1945 with registered capital of Baht 5 Million. The bank has been listed on the Stock Exchange of Thailand (SET) since 1976.

Choti was born in 1879 to a Hakka family. His father, Ng Yuk Long, was a second generation Thai Chinese with ancestry from Guangdong province. After Ng Meow Ngian, Yuk Long's father died, he took over and expanded the family's timber business. He also owned agricultural trading, saw mills and rice mills. After 1932, he set up an insurance and banking business. In 1939, Yuk Long was murdered by the local Chinese mafia. Choti and his brothers, Julin and Kasem, then took over the family business. During World War II, the banking industry started to grow and Choti established Thai Farmer Bank on June 8, 1945, focusing on retail banking and customers in the rural areas. Choti died in 1948 (2491 BE).

Choti Lamsam's grandson, Banthoon Lamsam, is ranked as the 21st richest in Thailand, Forbes, 2014.

== See also ==
- Lamsam family
