= Little Laureate =

American multimedia company

- Type: Private
- Industry: Educational multimedia
- Founded: 2001; 25 years ago
- Founders: Heather Maclean, Monica Gibson
- Headquarters: Lake Orion, Michigan, United States
- Website: littlelaureate.com

Little Laureate is an American company that produces developmental, multimedia products for small children and their caregivers. The company was founded in 2001 by Heather Maclean and Monica Gibson.

== Overview ==
Little Laureate's first products were DVD programs that promote world culture, conservation, and creativity using works of art, architecture and animals with classical music and world music. The series features animation, live footage, and a process the company has dubbed "Symphonic Art Animation," wherein onscreen visuals are animated in time to classical music. The series is hosted by an animated star named "Star."

Little Laureate products are meant to be watched with an adult and provide adult-only special features to promote that concept. Every piece of art onscreen is identified by a caption, like music videos, that cite the name of the work and its artist. The DVD includes an onscreen written guide called "The Crawl" that resembles VH1's Pop-up Video, and is designed to give information, inspiration, and humor to adult viewers.

== Titles ==
- My World Gallery
- My World Adventure
- My World Colors
- My World Safari
- For the Love of Art (re-issued as "My World Gallery")
- For the Love of World Travel (re-issued as "My World Adventure")

== Awards ==
- 2004: "Best Video Series of All Time," Parents magazine
- 2004: "Video of the Year," Parenting magazine
- 2007: "Media of the Year," Creative Child magazine
- "Gold Award," National Association of Parenting Publications
- "Top 10 Best Audio Products," Dr. Toy
- "Top 100 Best Products," Dr. Toy

== Firsts ==
Little Laureate was the first children's series to license a song from the African Children's Choir; "Bolingo" appears on My World Safari.
