= Wanglee House =

Historic house in Bangkok, Thailand

- บ้านหวั่งหลี
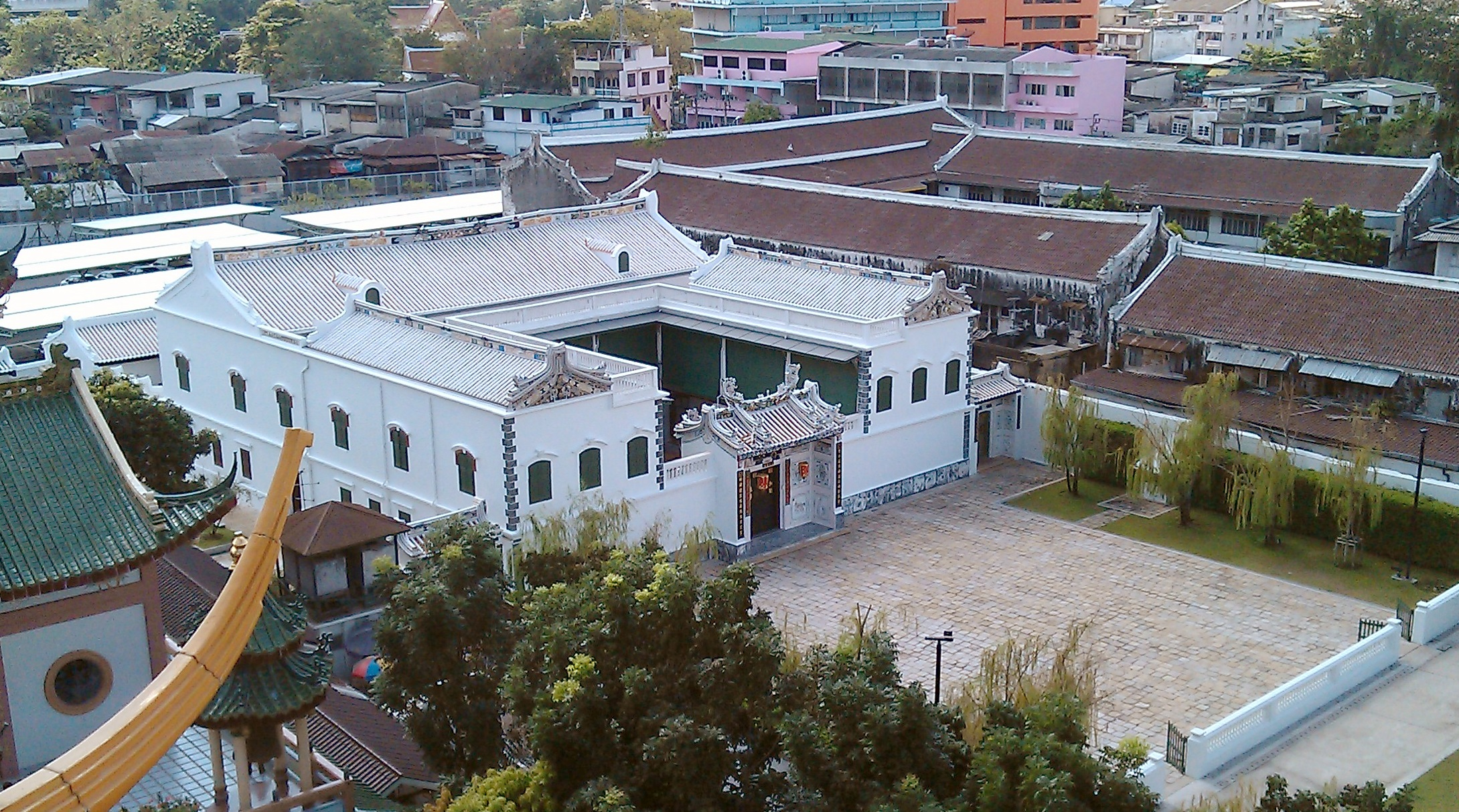

General information
- Location: Chiang Mai Rd., Khlong San District, Bangkok, Thailand
- Coordinates: 13°44′2″N 100°30′29″E
- Completed: 1881
- Owner: Chalan Wanglee

Design and construction
- Awards: ASA Architectural Conservation Award, 1984

The Wanglee House (Thai: บ้านหวั่งหลี) is a historic building in the Thai capital Bangkok. It sits on the west bank of the Chao Phraya River, in Khlong San District. The house was built in 1881 for Tan Siew-Wang, an influential Chinese-Thai businessman and founder of the Wanglee family. A modified Chinese courtyard house with two storeys and a U-shaped plan, its style is based on the family home of the Poshyananda family, to which Tan's wife belonged. The house received the ASA Architectural Conservation Award in 1984.

== See also ==
- So Heng Tai Mansion, a Chinese courtyard house in Samphanthawong District
