= Kasikornbank =

Banking group in Thailand

- Type: Public
- Traded as: SET: KBANK
- ISIN: TH0016010009
- Industry: Banking
- Founded: 8 June 1945; 81 years ago as Thai Farmers Bank
- Founder: Choti Lamsam
- Headquarters: Phaya Thai District, Bangkok 10400, THAILAND
- Number of locations: 887 branches, 8,184 ATMs (Thailand-1Q2023)
- Key people: Ms. Kattiya Indaravijaya, CEO
- Revenue: ▼185,002 million baht (2023)
- Net income: ▲38,721 million baht (2023)
- Total assets: ▲53,485,809 million baht (2023)
- Number of employees: 20,684 people (1Q2023)
- Subsidiaries: Kasikorn Asset Management; Kasikorn Securities; Kasikorn Leasing; Kasikorn Factory & Equipment; Kasikorn Research Center
- Website: www.kasikornbank.com/en/ir

Kasikornbank (Thai: ธนาคารกสิกรไทย, RTGS: Thanakhan Kasikon Thai, Teochew: Khai-thài Ngîng-hâng, simplified Chinese: 开泰银行; traditional Chinese: 開泰銀行; pinyin: Kāi Tài Yínháng, stylised in all caps), often stylised as KBank and formerly known as the Thai Farmers Bank, is a banking group in Thailand. KBank was established on 8 June 1945 (2488 BE) by Choti Lamsam, with registered capital of five million baht. It has been listed on the Stock Exchange of Thailand since 1976. On 8 April 2003, Thai Farmers Bank PCL changed its English name to Kasikornbank PCL (official abbreviation, KBank).

As of April 2020, the CEO is Kattiya Indaravijaya. The previous chairman and CEO, Bantoon Lamsam, who held the position for 28 years, was the grandson of the founder.

== History ==
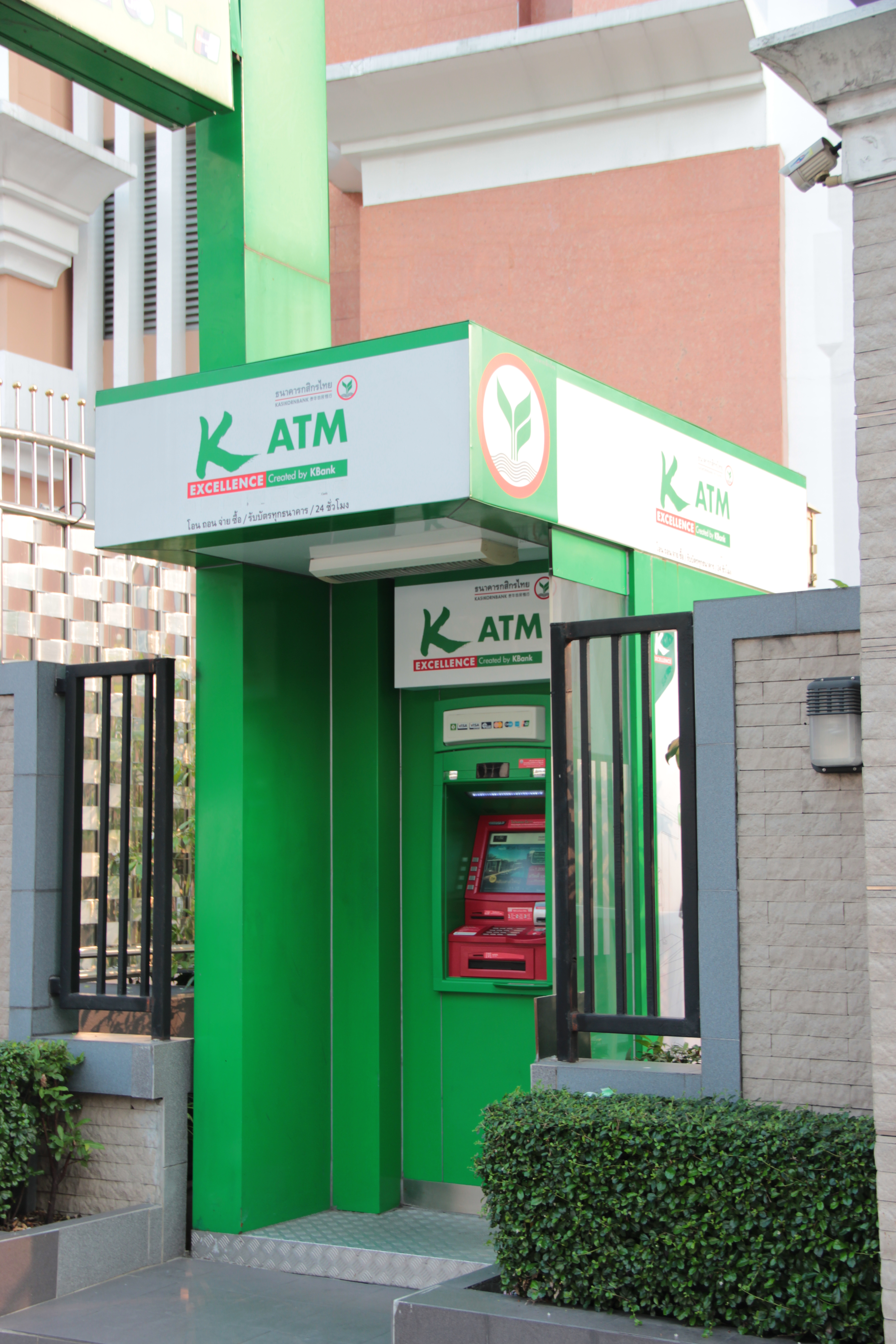
Kasikornbank ATM, Bangkok

Kasikornbank (then Thai Farmers Bank) was established on 8 June 1945, with registered capital of five million baht and 21 employees. Its first office is now the Thanon Sua Pa Main Branch. As of 31 December 1945, or at the end of its first accounting period, the bank recorded total deposits of 12 million baht and assets of 15 million baht.

- 1945 - Established Thai Farmers Bank(TFB)
- 1961 - The Thai Farmers Bank first capital increase to 14 million baht with total assets of around 400 million (behind Bangkok Bank 1,465 million and Siam Commercial Bank 546 million and Bank of Ayudhya 456 million).
- 1962 - Ranked ninth largest commercial bank in Thailand with 36 branches nationwide.
- 1967 - Opened branches in London, Hamburg, and New York City.
- 1973 - Thailand's first bank to offer credit card services, the "Multi-Purpose Credit Card".
- 1976 - Listed on the Stock Exchange of Thailand (SET) with registered capital of 300 million baht, total assets of 60 billion baht, and 108 branches.
- 1980 - The first bank in Thailand to issue Floating Rate Certificates of Deposit, valued at US$25 million, on the London market.
- 1998 - Kasikornbank introduces SLIPS (Stapled Limited Interest Preferred Stock), a new financial vehicle for fundraising.
- 2003 - On 8 April, the English name of the bank was changed from Thai Farmers Bank PCL (TFB) to Kasikornbank PCL (KBank) and its official abbreviated name from TFB to KBank.
- 2007 - Introduced tri-language logo: Thai, Chinese, English.
- 2009 - KBank issued "K-My Debit Card", the first debit card service that allowed customers to personalize their debit cards.
- 2010 - Introduced off-hours foreign exchange dealing.
- 2012 - The first bank through which Myanmar workers can remit funds to their country; equipped its ATMs with a menu in Burmese. Changed the name of KBank in China to Kāi tài yínháng (开泰银行).
- 2013 - Opened a branch in Chengdu, its second branch in China.
- 2014 - Full-service locally incorporated bank in Laos.
- 2017 - Upgraded entity in China to LII (Locally Incorporated Institution).
- 2018 - Issued US$100m worth of green bonds, a landmark achievement in Thailand
- 2021 - KBank was granted a license to establish a branch in Ho Chi Minh City on 19 January 2021, and the branch was established in August 2021

== Financials ==
For fiscal year 2019, KBank reported revenues of 185,002 million baht, assets of 3,293,889 million baht, and net profit of 38,721 million baht, all up from FY2018. As of 1Q2020 the bank had 887 branches, 8,184 ATMs, and 20,681 employees in Thailand.

== Overseas branches ==
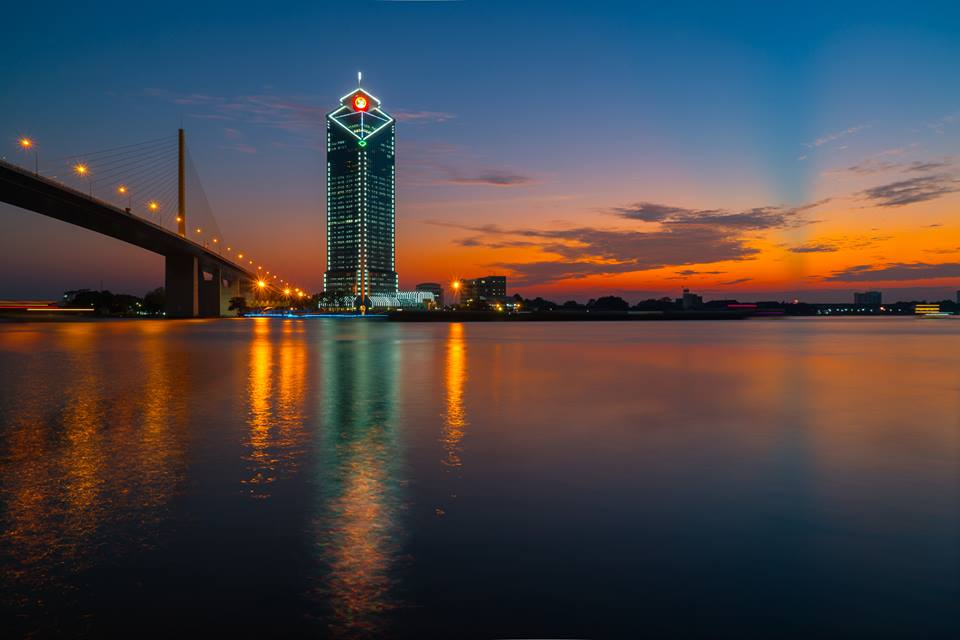
KBank headquarters, Bangkok

- KBank has two subsidiary banks: KASIKORNTHAI BANK (Lao PDR) with two branches in Vientiane and KASIKORNBANK (CHINA) with branches in Shenzhen, Chengdu, and Shanghai and one sub-branch in Long Gang.
- Three international branches: Cayman Islands, Hong Kong, and Phnom Penh
- Seven representative offices: Beijing, Kunming, Tokyo, Yangon, Ho Chi Minh, Hanoi, and Jakarta
- One strategic partner in Indonesia: Bank Maspion
- Global partners with 76 banks in 14 countries: 51 Japanese partner banks; 10 Chinese partner banks; one Hong Kong bank; two Korean partner banks; seven ASEAN partner banks (Vietnam, Indonesia, Lao PDR, Cambodia, Philippines, and Malaysia); four European regional banks (in Germany, Italy, and Russia) and one Indian Bank (as of December 2019)

== Notable former employees ==
- Piyasvasti Amranand (Executive Chairman of KAsset, 2003-2006) - Chairman of the Energy for Environment Foundation, former President of Thai Airways International (2009-2012), Minister of Energy (2006-2008), Secretary-General of the Thai National Energy Policy Office (1994-2000)
- Rapee Sucharitakul (Chairman of Kasikorn Securities, 2005-2008 and Executive Chairman of KAsset, 2009-2011) - Secretary-General of the Securities and Exchange Commission (2015-2019)
- Prasarn Trairatvorakul (President, 2004-2010) - 22nd Governor of the Bank of Thailand (2010-2015) and Secretary-General of the SEC (1999-2003)
- Kittiratt Na-Ranong (1985) - Deputy Prime Minister (2011-2014) and Minister of Finance (2012-2014), Minister of Commerce (2011-2012), MD of SET (2001-2006)
- M.R. Pridiyathorn Devakula (SEVP, 1971-1990) – Deputy Prime Minister and Minister of Finance (2006-2007), the 20th Governor of the Bank of Thailand (2001-2006), President of Export-Import Bank of Thailand (1993)
- Thongchai McIntyre - Thai pop singer

== See also ==
- Thai Farmers Bank F.C.
