= People's Democratic Reform Committee =

Protest group opposed to Thaksin Shinawatra

- คณะกรรมการประชาชนเพื่อการเปลี่ยนแปลงประเทศไทยให้เป็นประชาธิปไตยที่สมบูรณ์ อันมีพระมหากษัตริย์ทรงเป็นประมุข
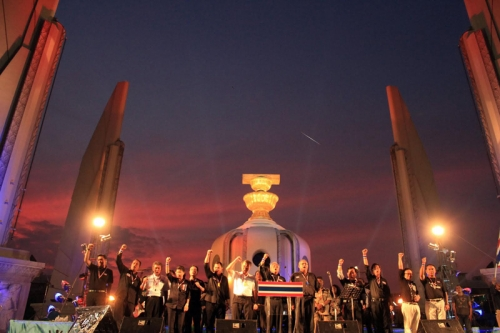
- Abbreviation: PDRC; กปปส.
- Formation: 31 October 2013; 29 November 2013 (formed officially)
- Dissolved: 22 May 2014
- Legal status: Defunct
- Location: Bangkok
- Region served: Thailand
- Members: Former members of the Democrat Party; Network of Students and People for Reform of Thailand (NPRST); The PAD rebranded as the "People's Movement to Overthrow the Thaksin Regime" (PMOTR); Dharma Army
- Secretary-General: Suthep Thaugsuban
- Budget: >10 million Thai Baht daily (January 2014 estimate)

The People's Democratic Reform Committee (PDRC) or People's Committee for Absolute Democracy with the King as Head of State (PCAD) (Note: Full title: Thai: คณะกรรมการประชาชนเพื่อการเปลี่ยนแปลงประเทศไทยให้เป็นประชาธิปไตยที่สมบูรณ์ อันมีพระมหากษัตริย์ทรงเป็นประมุข, lit. 'people's committee for changing Thailand into a complete democracy with the king as head of state') was a reactionary umbrella political pressure group in Thailand. Its aim was to remove the influence of former premier Thaksin Shinawatra from Thai politics by deposing the incumbent Pheu Thai government of Yingluck Shinawatra and creating an unelected "People's Council" to oversee political reforms. The group played a key role in the 2013–14 Thai political crisis and the lead up to the 2014 Thai coup d'état, organising large-scale protests within Bangkok and disrupting voting in the 2014 Thai general election in order to prevent a predicted victory by Pheu Thai.

The group was formed on 29 November 2013 by Suthep Thaugsuban, who resigned from his post as Democrat Party secretary-general and MP, and appointed himself as PDRC secretary-general. Although much of the movement's message revolved around anti-politics, the PDRC was a diverse coalition united by little more than opposition to the government of Yingluck Shinawatra; it was made up of members of the opposition Democrat Party, the People's Alliance for Democracy (a coalition opposed to Thaksin known as "Yellow Shirts"), student activist groups, state workers' unions and pro-military groups. The PDRC's support stemmed mostly from affluent Bangkokians and Southerners. Whistle-blowing was a central symbol of the protests.

By accusing the government of lacking legitimacy, Suthep Thaugsuban announced the intention of the People's Democratic Reform Committee to take back power from the government and proceed with national reform through a non-elected royalist council, in order to "eradicate" the "Thaksin regime". Suthep outlined plans for the council to "act as a legislative body, amend laws and regulations, as well as carry out a reform plan in the country". He also explained the council would have 400 members, 300 of whom would be representatives from various professions. The remaining 100 would be selected by the PDRC from scholars and well-respected senior citizens.

The ultimate goal of the PDRC was to have the prime minister Yingluck Shinawatra resign as the head of the caretaker government in order to create a power vacuum, then invoke articles 3 (Note: "The sovereign power belongs to the Thai people. The King as Head of State shall exercise such power through the National Assembly, the Council of Ministers and the Courts in accordance with the provisions of this Constitution.") and article 7 (Note: "Whenever no provision under this Constitution is applicable to any case, it shall be decided in accordance with the constitutional convention in the democratic regime of government with the King as Head of State.") of the 2007 Constitution. This would have allowed the head of the senate to appoint a new premier. Yingluck and nine other senior ministers were removed from office by Constitutional Court on 7 May 2014. The military then seized power in a coup d'état on 22 May, a move which was applauded by many PDRC protesters. The PDRC was disbanded shortly after the coup.

== Formation and role in 2013-14 political crisis ==
Thai politics has been characterized since the 1950s by periodic shows of popular force; mass Yellow Shirt protests immediately preceded the 2006 coup, and a pro-Thaksin Red Shirt rally that engulfed central Bangkok in 2010 was violently crushed with more than 80 civilians killed and around 2,000 injured.

After three consecutive election victories for various Thaksin-backed political parties, the newly formed People's Democratic Reform Committee, a coalition of Yellow Shirt groups fiercely opposed to the ruling Pheu Thai party, decided to begin street protests in Bangkok. The direct precursor of the protests was a proposed amnesty bill which aimed to reconcile differences between supporters and opponents of Thaksin; it would have pardoned Thai politicians from various crimes since the 2006 coup, including murder charges against Abhisit Vejjajiva and Suthep Thaugsuban, politicians opposed to Thaksin, for their role in the 2010 crackdown. PDRC protesters accused the proposed bill of being a backdoor attempt to allow Thaksin Shinawatra to return home from self-imposed exile without facing a corruption conviction. After opposition from both the Democrat Party and parts of the pro-government Red Shirt movement, the bill was rejected unanimously by the Senate of Thailand on 11 November. On 20 November the Constitutional Court also ruled that a government-proposed amendment to the 2007 constitution that would have made the Senate a fully elected body was invalid.

PDRC protests in Bangkok continued, disrupting economic life and government functioning with a series of rallies at 11 key sites across the city. The protests reached their height in mid-January 2014, at which point they involved nearly 500,000 people. By late-April they had declined significantly and involved no more than several thousand protestors.

Prime Minister Yingluck dissolved the Thai parliament following the recommencement of protests and announced a new election in accordance with the Thai constitution. The constitution stated that elections must be held 45 to 60 days from the date that parliament is dissolved. The PDRC opposed the election announcement and stated that it would boycott the process. The election was held on 2 February and the PDRC disrupted polling in parts of Bangkok and southern Thailand, causing the result to be annulled by the Thai courts.

Despite attempts by the private sector, military and caretaker government to find a solution to the crisis, PDRC leader Suthep Thaugsuban said he would not negotiate with the government, the military or any other mediator, but would fight until the PDRC achieved its goal of having a royally-appointed people council conduct reforms before any election to eradicate the "Thaksin regime". Yingluck Shinawatra continued as caretaker prime minister for three months after the annulled election until she was controversially removed from office by the Constitutional Court on 7 May over the transfer of a senior security officer in 2011. The military then launched a coup later in May. In 2021, political scientists Duncan McCargo and Naruemon Thabchumpon wrote that the PDRC "bears a significant degree of responsibility for the fact that Thailand remains under a hybrid form of military rule today."

== Organizations aligned with the PDRC ==
- The Democrat Party, conservative and royalist backed by the military and most of the Bangkok-based elite with also strong support in south Thailand.
- The Network of Students and People for Reform of Thailand (NSPRT), the PDRC hardline faction under the leadership of Nithithorn Lamleua and Uthai Yodmanee.
- The People's Alliance for Democracy or "Yellow shirt" rebranded as the "People's Movement to Overthrow the Thaksin Regime" (Pefot). The PAD consists of mainly of royalist upper and middle-class Bangkokians and Southerners, supported by some factions of the Thai Army, some leaders of Democrat Party, and members of state-enterprise labor unions. The PAD was responsible for the seizure of Suvarnabhumi International Airport in 2008.
- The Dharma Army, led by former Palang Dharma Party leader Major General Chamlong Srimuang and a key leader of the People's Alliance for Democracy. The Dharma army is a network of foundations and associations, the most known is the Santi Asoke Buddhist sect.
- "Rubbish Collection Organisation" founded by Rienthong Nanna (director of Mongkutwattana General Hospital) that aims at persecuting citizens who — in their view — do not respect the monarchy sufficiently. The rhetoric of this ultra-royalist vigilante group has induced fear of a potential "witch-hunt" on dissenters. Their likening of opponents to "trash" has been condemned as dehumanising by Human Rights Watch and the Simon Wiesenthal Center's dean Abraham Cooper.

== Leaders ==
- Suthep Thaugsuban, Secretary-general of PDRC; former Democrat Party secretary-general, former MP from Surat Thani, former deputy prime minister (2008–2011)
- Akanat Promphan, former Democrat Party MP for Bangkok
- Chumpol Julasai, former Democrat Party MP for Chumphon
- Issara Somchai, former Democrat Party MP for Ubon Ratchathani, former minister of social development and human security
- Nataphol Teepsuwan, former Democrat Party MP for Bangkok
- Puttipong Punnakanta, former Democrat Party MP for Bangkok, former deputy governor of Bangkok
- Sathit Wongnongtoey, former Democrat Party MP for Trang, former minister to the office of the Prime Minister (2008–11)
- Thaworn Senniam, former Democrat Party MP for Songkhla, former deputy interior minister
- Witthaya Kaewparadai, former deputy chairman of the Democrat Party, former minister of public health (2008–09)

== Major allies ==
- Abhisit Vejjajiva, former prime minister and leader of the Democrat Party
- Korn Chatikavanij, former finance minister and member of the Democrat Party
- Pipob Thongchai, advisor to the PDRC; education reform activist (Foundation for Children), former PAD core leader, former leader of the Campaign for Popular Democracy, co-leader of the Black May uprising 1992
- Chitpas Kridakorn née Bhirombhakdi, former deputy spokeswoman of the Democrat Party, granddaughter of Chamnong Bhirombhakdi, owner of Boon Rawd Brewery (best known for its product Singha beer)
- Seri Wongmontha associate professor of communication arts at the Naresuan University Graduate School, playwright and actor (e.g. Saving Private Tootsie), jury president of Miss International Queen
- Prasong Soonsiri, former chairman of the National Security Council, former minister of foreign affairs (1992–94), self-identified architect of the 2006 coup d'état
- Somkiat Pongpaiboon, former assistant professor of education at Nakhon Ratchasima Rajabhat University, former PAD core leader, former Democrat Party MP, former Assembly of the Poor activist
- Somsak Kosaisuuk, trade union leader (State Enterprise Labour Relations Confederation), former PAD core leader, co-leader of the Black May uprising 1992, leader of New Politics Party
- Suriyasai Katasila, former PAD coordinator, former secretary-general of New Politics Party
- Sonthiyarn Chuenruethai-naitham, owner of T news agency; arrested on 10 February 2014
- Suthin Taratin, shot and killed during a rally on 26 January 2014
- Sakoltee Phattiyakul, former Democrat Party MP for Bangkok
- Chaiwut Bannawat, former Democrat Party MP for Tak, former minister of industry
- Chinnaworn Boonyakiat, former Democrat Party MP for Nakhon Si Thammarat, former minister of education
- Satish Sehgal, an Indian businessman in Thailand, former president of the India-Thai Business Association
- Srivara Issara, Thai female real estate developer
- Thanat Thanakitamnuay or Nat Noble, heir of leading real estate company
- Taya Teepsuwan née Srivikorn, member of Democrat Party, former deputy governor of bangkok, Nataphol Teepsuwan's wife
- Anchalee Paireerak, famous freelance female journalist
- Attawit Suwanpakdee, former Democrat Party MP for Bangkok
- Luang Pu Buddha Issara, then abbot of Wat Or Noi temple, Nakhon Pathom province

Many Thai artists, actors, singers and celebrities expressed support for the PDRC, including Yong Lookyee, Jetrin Wattanasin, Jirayut Wattanasin, Pongpat Wachirabunjong, Sinjai Plengpanich, Chatchai Plengpanich, Sattawat "Tae" Sethakorn, Pongsak "Aof" Rattanapong, Pakin "Tono" Khamwilaisak, Pattaratida "Tangmo" Patcharaveerapong, Thep Po-ngam, Rang Rockestra, Caravan, Chintara Sukapatana, Jarunee Suksawat, Sarawit "Mor Kong" Subun, Atom Samphanthapab, Sakchai Guy, Pornthip Rojanasunand, Krisana Kraisintu, Kamron Pramoj na Ayudhya, Achita Pramoj na Ayudhya, Nussaba Punnakanta, ML Piyapas Bhirombhakdi, the Chirathivat family, Chai Rachwat, Kanok Ratwongsakul, Teera Tanyapaibul, Suthipong Thamawuit, Santisuk Promsiri, Rattanaballang Tohssawat, Lalita "Mew" Panyopas, Kijmanoch "Kru Lilly" Rojanasupya, Treechada "Nong Poy" Petcharat.
