= Sondhi Limthongkul =

Thai media proprietor and activist (born 1947)

- สนธิ ลิ้มทองกุล
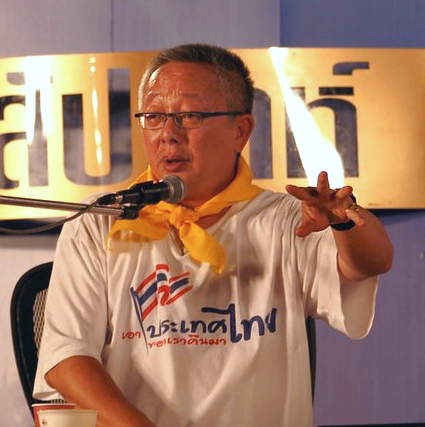
- Sondhi in 2006
- Born: 7 November 1947 (age 79); Sukhothai, Thailand
- Education: Utah State University (MA); University of California, Los Angeles
- Years active: 1973–2016; 2019–present
- Organization: Manager Daily
- Political party: New Politics
- Movement: People's Alliance for Democracy
- Spouse: Chanthip Limthongkul
- Children: 1

Sondhi Limthongkul (Note: Thai: สนธิ ลิ้มทองกุล; RTGS: Sonthi Limthongkun; Chinese: 林明達; pinyin: Lín Míngdá) (born 7 November 1947) is a Thai media proprietor, conspiracy theorist, anti-American, anti-establishment conservative nationalist activist, demagogue, and leader of the People's Alliance for Democracy (PAD). In 2009, he was elected leader of the New Politics Party (NPP).

Starting his career as a journalist, he later founded Manager Daily newspaper as well as satellite broadcaster ASTV. Originally a strong supporter of former prime minister Thaksin Shinawatra, he later became a leader of the anti-Thaksin movement. Under his leadership, the PAD was the major player in the 2005–2006 Thai political crisis that led to the 2006 coup d'état that toppled the Thaksin government. When Thaksin-affiliated parties won the 2007 general election, Sondhi became the major player in the 2008–2009 Thai political crisis, leading the PAD in violent clashes with security forces and anti-PAD protestors as well as the seizure of Government House, Don Muang Airport, and Suvarnabhumi Airport. Sondhi is more or less a supporter of the Democrat Party and stopped the PAD's protests after Democrat leader Abhisit Vejjajiva was appointed prime minister.

In April 2009, Abhisit faced massive anti-government protests led by the pro-Thaksin red shirts which caused the Fourth East Asia Summit to be canceled and was followed by riots in Bangkok. Days after the Bangkok unrest was quelled by military force, gunmen ambushed Sondhi's car, a black Toyota Vellfire, at a petrol station. They shot out the tires, and fired over 100 M-16 and AK-47 assault rifle rounds at the car. The attackers escaped from the scene when Sondhi's followers in another car opened fire on them. Sondhi suffered a serious head wound but remained conscious, standing and lucid before being sent to a hospital for emergency surgery. Sondhi survived the surgery, which involved removing several bullet fragments embedded about half a centimetre deep in his skull. It is not certain who was behind the shooting, though Sondhi's son and PAD's spokesmen speculated that a faction of the military or police might have been behind it.

On 6 September 2016, the Supreme Court of Thailand ruled that he must serve the 20 years in prison sentence ruled by the Appeals Court in 2012, when he was freed on bail. The sentence, according to the Supreme Court, will not be suspended. He was found guilty of violating the Securities and Exchange Act by falsifying documents in 1997 to secure a loan from Krung Thai Bank amounting to 1.08 billion baht. He was released from jail early on 4 September 2019 on royal pardon.

== The media mogul ==
Sondhi founded Manager Daily in 1982 after several ventures in publishing. The newspaper became his personal mouthpiece, and he used the profits to build a publishing, broadcasting, and telecommunications empire.

During Bloody May in 1992, Sondhi and his media played a significant role in opposing the then military government's crackdown on protesters, issuing a free special tabloid on the events when the government threatened to shut down his newspaper.

By 1996, he had over US$600 million in assets. His business faced a meltdown following the 1997 Asian financial crisis, forcing him into bankruptcy and sparking investigations into irregular inter-company transactions. Immediately after the crisis, Sondhi furiously attacked the Democrat-led government over its management of the economic recovery. With the election of Thaksin Shinawatra as prime minister in 2001, several of Sondhi's associates became leaders in the new government. His banker, Viroj Nualkhair, became president of state-owned Krung Thai Bank and gave more than a billion baht in "debt forgiveness" to Sondhi, allowing him to emerge from bankruptcy. Sondhi became a vocal supporter of Thaksin, calling him "the best prime minister our country has ever had."

In 2005, Viroj Nualkhair was dismissed from the KTB after incurring over 40 billion baht in problem loans. Sondhi then began criticizing Thaksin using the media under his control, including satellite broadcaster ASTV. He founded the People's Alliance for Democracy, aimed at overthrowing the Thaksin government. The PAD cancelled their activities after a military coup overthrew Thaksin. However, when Thaksin-affiliated parties won a post-coup election, and vowed to revise the new constitution, which they claimed was 'undemocratic', the PAD reformed and renewed its protests. In 2008, Sondhi and PAD demonstrators occupied Government House and barricaded themselves inside for months. They later seized Don Muang Airport and Suvarnabhumi Airport and closed them for several days, stranding thousands of travelers. At the height of the protests, the PAD declared the only person they would accept as Premier was Abhisit Vejjajiva, leader of the opposition Democrat Party. The protests ended when the Constitutional Court banned the People's Power Party for corruption. Army commander and co-leader of the 2006 coup, General Anupong Paochinda, pressured several PPP MPs to switch to the Democrat Party, allowing Abhisit to form a government and become prime minister. PAD leader Khamnoon Sitthisamarn called Abhisit's premiership a "genuine PAD victory" and a "Anupong-style coup."

Citing the claimed failure of popular democracy in Thailand, Sondhi has suggested constitutional amendments that some members of parliament should be chosen by profession, a proposal that was seen as 'undemocratic' by his opponents. Closely affiliated with Queen Sirikit and prominent royalists, Sondhi regularly invoked king Bhumibol Adulyadej in his protests, and has claimed that his enemies are disloyal to the monarchy, aiming at destroying the country's political form. Sondhi has openly called for the military and Thailand's traditional elite to take a greater role in politics.

== Early life and career (pre-1982) ==
Sondhi was born in Sukhothai Province to a Thai Chinese family with ancestry from Hainan. His paternal grandfather was born in Hainan before settling in Sukhothai and marrying a Thai woman. Sondhi’s Thai-born father was sent to study in China and eventually became a Kuomintang army officer after training at Whampoa Military Academy; he later returned to Thailand during the Chinese Communist Revolution and married a Hainan-born woman who was Sondhi’s mother. Sondhi majored in history at the University of California, Los Angeles, where he was a reporter for the student newspaper, The Daily Bruin, from 1966 to 1969. He received his M.A. degree from Utah State University in 1972.

Returning to Thailand, he worked for the newspaper Prachatipatai (Democracy) as a reporter and managing editor in 1973 and 1974. He wrote several exposés of the political developments that led to the student protests and bloodshed on October 14, 1973, an event which brought down the military government of Field Marshal Thanom Kittikachorn and led to a restoration of democracy.

In 1976, he set up the Advance Media Group with real estate investor Paul Sittiamnuay. The group produced four publications, including a short-lived English-language daily called Business Times (not connected with the current Business Times), with Sondhi as an editor. The newspaper collapsed after Paul Sittiamnuay was investigated over a real estate scandal, went bankrupt and fled the country.

In 1979, Sondhi set up his own company, Karawek, which published a women's magazine, Pooying, from 1980 to 1982.

== The Manager era (1982–1997) ==
In 1982, Sondhi established the business monthly Phoojatkarn (Manager), which he produced in a room in his father's house. Phoojatkarn Monthly was soon a success, and four years later Sondhi began a weekly with the same name. He later published a daily newspaper, Phoojadkarn Rai Wan. Phoojatkarn Daily has often been regarded as Sondhi's personal mouthpiece.

Sondhi eventually established a publishing house called the Manager Group (also known as the M Group), as a holding company for his media outlets. Among the companies he purchased were the IT firms SCT and Micronetic, and the handset retailer IEC. IEC was the exclusive handset retailer for Nokia phones, and its major customers were the two rival mobile-phone groups Advanced Info Service, which belonged to future prime minister Thaksin Shinawatra, and Total Access Communication (later known as DTAC).

During this period, Sondhi also expanded into English-language publishing, with an English edition of Manager, the Hong Kong-based monthly Asia Inc, and a regional daily newspaper the Asia Times. He briefly owned a local lifestyle magazine in Los Angeles known as Buzz. Sondhi was characterized in the media as an "Asian Rupert Murdoch," and he hired aggressively, bringing in both Asian and Western journalists. Asia Inc was eventually sold, and went through several ownership changes. It is currently owned by Singapore-based Edge Asia Inc Media Group. The Asia Times folded in 1997, though an online edition, run by some of the paper's former staff, continues to operate Asia Times Online.

Before taking IEC public in 1992, Sondhi allotted a 17.5 per cent stake in the company to Thaksin. Thaksin bought the stake at Bt10 per share. After the listing, IEC's share price shot up to THB 250 each and Thaksin sold out his stake. Sondhi said Thaksin made between THB 600 million to THB 700 million from the IEC float. Sondhi wrote in his book, "One Must Know How To Lose Before Knowing How To Win", that he felt that Thaksin was a free rider and did not want to do business with him.

The Manager Group-led Asia Broadcasting and Communications Network (ABCN) set up its satellite project, Lao Star Co – which was worth about THB 9 billion – as a joint venture with the Laotian government in 1995. Lao Star appointed Space System/Loral to build two L-Star satellites and L-Star 1 was set to officially launch to provide digital direct-to-home TV programmes in 1998. L-Star 2 was to be put into orbit in 1999. The project was planned to serve around 2 billion people in the Asia Pacific region, including India and China. Later ABCN enlisted DTAC's parent, United Communication Industry Plc (Ucom), to back its business.

IEC also provided a bulk of the mobile-phone airtime to DTAC before purchasing the 1800 MHz frequency from DTAC to develop its own mobile-phone operator Wireless Communication Service (WCS). WCS offered the service under the brand Digital 01.

Sondhi expanded and diversified widely. He owned a hotel in China's Yunnan province, ran a cement factory in Vietnam, and set up a regional business conference company. Most of his investments were woven in a complex series of cross-shareholdings. Sondhi himself kept few direct holdings in any of the companies, but was ultimately in control through his ownership of holding companies like M Group and other holding companies registered in the British Virgin Islands. Such a structure minimized Sondhi's tax bill and provided maximum protection in case of financial difficulties.

In 1996, Fortune magazine had put Sondhi's assets at US$600 million (or THB 12 billion at the exchange-rate of THB 25 to a US dollar). He received an honorary doctorate from Chiang Mai University. He often travelled around Thailand in a chartered personal business jet from Thai Airways and was often seen escorting Chinese movie star Gong Li.

== Bankruptcy and anti-Democrat period (1997–2001) ==
Following the 1997 Asian financial crisis, Sondhi's satellite and publishing businesses faced a meltdown. His WCS was sold to the CP Group before it was renamed TA Orange and later became True Move. The Manager Group was saddled with THB 20 billion in debt but only THB 4 billion in equity. The Manager Group's holding company alone had liabilities of THB 6 billion. Manager Media had Bt4.7 billion in debt. Sondhi was personally in debt for THB 1.5 billion. Sondhi ended up declaring himself bankrupt for three years. This meant that his THB 1.5 billion debt could be claimed from whatever was in his personal account for a span of three years, rather than having to repay the debt over 15 or 20 years as earlier scheduled.

Sondhi's companies were also investigated for irregular inter-company transactions. IEC guaranteed a THB 1.2 billion baht loan by M group in 1996, but never disclosed this guarantee to the public. M Group later defaulted on the loan, sending IEC into bankruptcy

Auditors of Eastern Printing, Sondhi's SET-listed printing company, noted that its huge losses partially stemmed from loans to associated companies and the establishment of off-balance accounts to related publishing companies. For example, in its 2000 financial statement, Sondhi-linked companies Asia Inc and FRYE Smith (USA) Co owed Bt59.86 million and Bt125.79 million respectively to Eastern Printing. Likewise, according to its 2000 financial statements, Manager Media lent Bt1.061 billion to related publishers, under guarantee from Sondhi.

The Manager Group furiously attacked the Democrat-led government over its management of the economic crisis during its time in office from late 1997 to 2000. This included scathing attacks on Finance Minister Tharin Nimmanhaeminda for his emergency financing agreements with the IMF and Deputy Prime Minister Sawit Bhodhivihok for his policy of privatizing the state-owned electricity sector.

== The Thaksin Era (2001–2006) ==
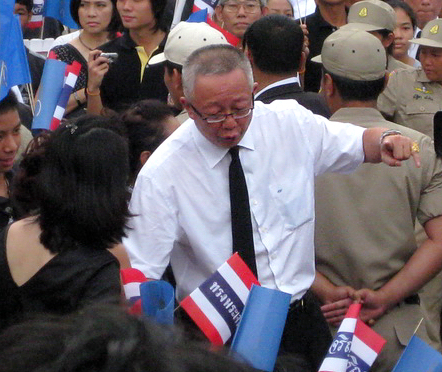
Sondhi in 2008

=== Pro-Thaksin Period ===
After the election of Thaksin Shinawatra as prime minister in 2001, Manager Daily lauded Thaksin's leadership, calling him Thailand's best prime minister ever. Somkid Jatusripitak, co-founder of the Manager Media Group and writer of a column for Manager Daily became Thaksin's commerce and finance minister. Pansak Vinyaratan, previously editor of the now defunct Sondhi-owned Asia Times, became Thaksin's chief policy adviser. Chai-anan Samudavanija, who chaired IEC and was head of several of Sondhi's foundations, won prominent jobs at state-owned Krung Thai Bank and Thai Airways International. Kanok Abhiradee, the head of one of Sondhi's companies, became president of Thai Airways. Viroj Nualkhair, Sondhi's former banker, replaced Sirin Nimmanhaeminda as president of the state-owned Krung Thai Bank. Under Viroj's management, the debt that Manager Group owed to Krung Thai Bank was reduced from Bt1.8 billion to THB 200 million.

Emerging from bankruptcy, Sondhi started his own TV show, 'Thailand Weekly' airing on MCOT's channel and co-hosted by Sarocha Pornudomsak. He also invested in two TV channels, 11/1 and 11/2 – a split from Television of Thailand Channel 11. A Democrat MP alleged that the Thaksin government gave favors to Sondhi and his companies.

In July 2003, Sondhi wrote in his newspaper predicting the US Dollar's failure in 2010 and at the same time suggested Thai people invest in gold.

=== Origins of the Anti-Thaksin Period ===
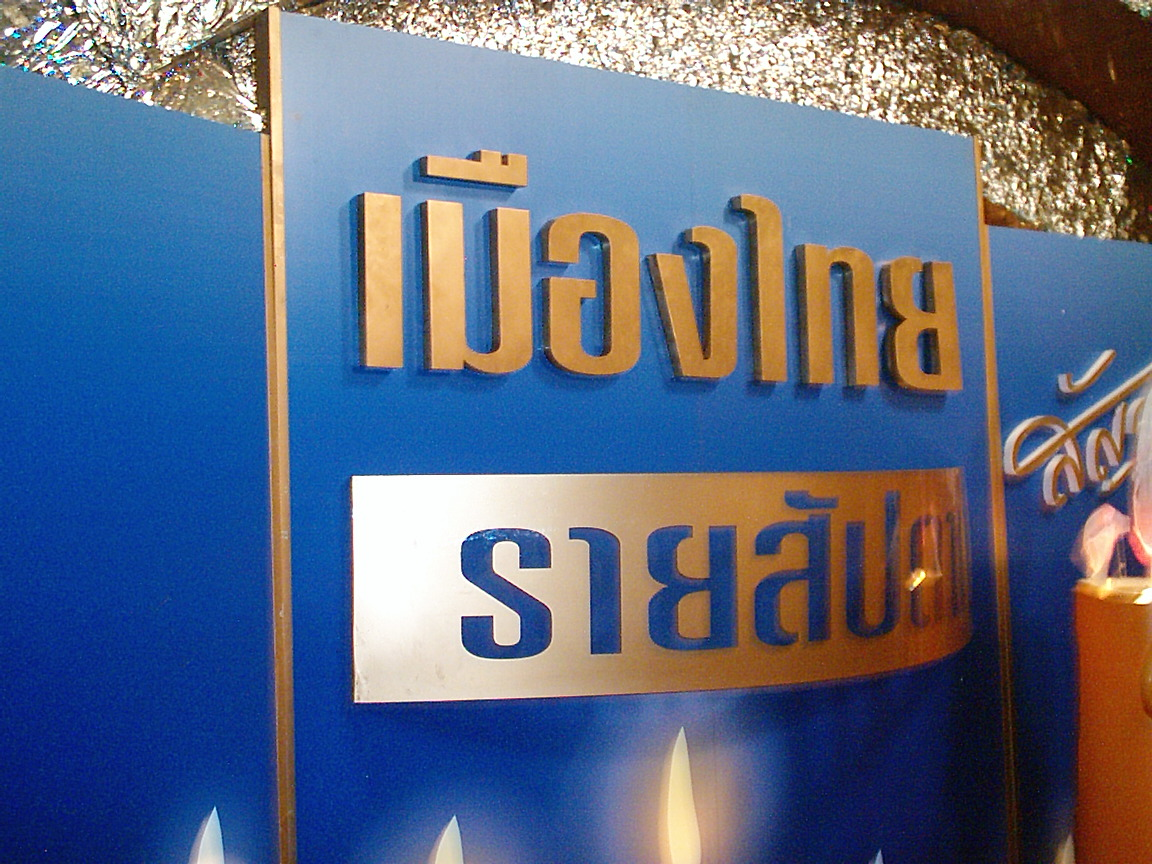
Muangthai Rai Sapda at Suan Lumphini

In 2004, state-owned Krung Thai Bank (KTB) shocked Thailand's financial world by reclassifying approximately Bt40 billion as problem loans. It was rumored that M.R. Pridiyathorn Devakula, the Bank of Thailand's governor, would fire KTB CEO Viroj Nualkhair if he did not resign voluntarily. Viroj Nualkhair was Sondhi's former financial advisor, having helped him IPO one of his first companies. As Krung Thai Bank's CEO, Viroj had forgiven Sondhi's debts by Bt1.6 billion and arranged for further rounds of forgiveness. Using all of his media outlets, Sondhi furiously attacked Pridiyathorn and defended Viroj. However, Viroj was eventually forced to leave Krung Thai Bank. Sondhi's public criticism of Thaksin increased.

Some claimed that the financial disagreement caused Sondhi's criticism of Thaksin's government. In July 2004, Sondhi's Channel 11/1 was temporarily ordered to stop broadcasting because of a contract dispute between cable operator UBC and the government regulator. Sondhi's criticism of Thaksin grew steadily throughout 2004 and 2005. He began criticizing Thaksin's government on the conflict of interest on the national petroleum company. With weekly critics on his Muangthai Rai Sapda (Thailand Weekly) television show, Thaksin's opposition received much attention.

In September 2005, MCOT (broadcaster of Channel 9), in response to allegations that Muangthai Rai Sapda had made inappropriate references to the monarchy, cancelled the program. However, Sondhi felt he was dropped for criticising the Thaksin government. He subsequently started broadcasting his talk show via satellite and webcasting it on the website of one of his newspapers, doubling his daily number of site visitors. The event became the magnet for oppositions of Thaksin's government.

=== The Luang Ta Maha Bua incident ===
On 27 September 2005, Phoochatkarn Daily published a sermon by Luang Ta Maha Bua, a popular but outspoken Buddhist monk. The sermon was seen by many as extremely critical of Thaksin, especially as it came from a monk. Especially controversial were the following passages:

"They complained to me about PM Thaksin and Mr. Visanu and two other people that I don't remember. This is the big ogre (Thai: ตัวยักษ์ใหญ่), big power. Atrocious power will swallow our country, bite the liver and lungs and aim for the presidency ... He will put a torch to the country. He will never listen ... This savagery and atrocity appear in every aspect of him ... All he has are things to be used for burning."

"He is clearly aiming for the presidency now. The monarch trampled, the religion trampled, the country trampled, by this savage and atrocious power in a few people in the government circle. That is the circle of ogres, of ghosts, of trolls, of demons (Thai: ยักษ์วงผีวงเปรตวงมาร), all in there ... So even Devadatta [an enemy of the Buddha] saw the harm he caused, and he was rewarded for his good deed. He would attain Buddhahood (Thai: พระปัจเจกพุทธเจ้า). For those who have made mistakes, if we see the harm we cause, we can still get by. But what is it with Thailand? What kind of governance?"

"They even dare to accuse Luangta Maha Bua of playing politics. Politics, dog shit (Thai: การบ้านการเมืองขี้หมาอะไร). There's only shit all over the country. I brought the Buddha's dharma to cleanse in order for them to repent and recognize good and evil. Because they're the government. The world flatters them as smart people, but don't be smart down in the toilet (Thai: แต่อย่าฉลาดลงส้วมลงถาน). Don't be smart about putting a torch to the head of everyone in the country, from Nation, Religion, and Monarchy on down. These people will get burned unless they recognize the truth. I'm saddened by all this. How does this come about?"

Thailand has no office of a presidency. The King is the head of state, and the prime minister is the head of government. A president would replace the King - an unthinkable affront to the Thais' reverence for their monarchy. Accusations of aspiration to a presidency are one of the most severe and rare criticisms a Thai politician can receive.

On 11 October 2005, Thaksin sued Sondhi and Manager newspaper for Bt500 million. As monks have traditionally been above criticism, Thaksin could not sue Luang Ta Maha Bua. "This is an exercise of an individual's right to protect his reputation and privacy. The newspaper did not criticise the prime minister fairly as a public official, but rather it took him to task personally, using harsh words, which was damaging to him," said Thana Benjathikul, Thaksin's lawyer.

Thaksin was immediately attacked by Sondhi and accused of gagging the press. Sondhi's lawyer, Suwat Apaipakdi, said that "every newspaper reproduced his [Luang Ta Maha Bua] comments. Why did Thaksin not sue him [Luang Ta Maha Bua]? He chose to sue only the Manager Media Group because it's linked to Khun Sondhi". Thaksin's legal team noted that other newspapers only published selected passages of the sermon, and furthermore, Sondhi had used an allegedly slanderous headline. Respected civil rights lawyer Thongbai Thongpao noted that Thaksin's lawsuit did have merit. He said the lawsuits "do not constitute an attack on freedom of the press".

The lawsuit, along with several other libel cases, was withdrawn after King Bhumibol Adulyadej indirectly advised against such legal action during his annual birthday speech.

=== The Royal Power / Temple of the Emerald Buddha incident ===
On 10 April 2005, Thaksin Shinawatra presided over a merit-making ceremony at the Temple of the Emerald Buddha, which is within the walls of the Grand Palace and contains the most revered Buddha figure in Thailand. Starting October 2005, the website of Manager newspaper ran an article alleging that the Prime Minister had usurped a royal function of the King by presiding over the ceremony. This led Sondhi to start using "We Love the King", "We Will Fight for the King", and "Return Power to the King" as his key anti-Thaksin rallying slogans. This allegation has been repeated in Sondhi's "Thailand Weekly" live tapings. It also became a staple of the thaiinsider.com website of Ekkayuth Anchanbutr, operator of the Charter pyramid scheme. A widely circulated anonymous spam email showed a picture of Thaksin sitting on a chair normally used by the King and asking, "People are familiar with images only of the King and members of the Royal Family, all dressed in royal uniforms and decorated with full regalia, presiding over grand ceremonies in the temple's main chapel. Yet this picture makes me think: What has happened to our country?".

On 9 November 2005, Cabinet secretary-general Bovornsak Uwanno, without showing any evidence, claimed that King Bhumibol Adulyadej had granted permission to Prime Minister Thaksin to preside over a grand merit-making ceremony. This was corroborated by Chaktham Thammasak, who was director-general of the Bureau of National Buddhism at the time of the event. Chaktham stated that the Royal Household Bureau arranged every aspect of the ceremony, including the positioning of the chairs.

On 17 November 2005, the Civil Court issued a gag order on Sondhi to prevent him from making further "royal powers" allegations. This immediately prompted Sondhi to attack Thaksin and accuse him of restricting press freedom.

Sondhi was investigated on two counts of lese-majesty against King Bhumibol Adulyadej. Counter-charges of lese-majesty were filed against Prime Minister Thaksin.

On 18 November, Supreme Commander General Ruengroj Mahasaranond harshly warned Sondhi against using the King as a political tool. "Our patience is reaching the breaking point. We may take action if Sondhi does not cease his criticism by citing the monarchy".

All charges were dropped after King Bhumibol Adulyadej advised against further action in his birthday speech on 5 December 2005. However, Sondhi continues to use "We Will Fight for the King" and "Return Power to the King" as rallying cries in his anti-Thaksin protests.

=== Ongoing political activism ===
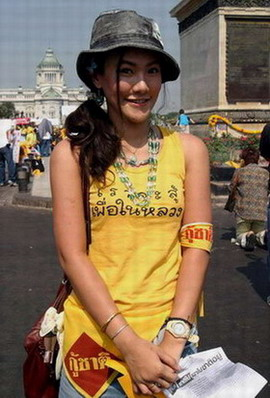
A protester wears a tank top with the anti-Thaksin slogan "We will fight for the King". Sondhi sold such T-shirts during public tapings of his television show.

Sondhi hosted an own outdoor talk show throughout late 2005 and early 2006 at Thammasat University and in Lumphini Park with his slogan, "We Fight for the King". His broadcasts/protests, which later became the core of the People's Alliance for Democracy attracted many protesters, with the largest one on February 4, 2006 at the Royal Plaza drawing between 40,000–50,000 (foreign media estimates) and 100,000 (local media estimates) protestors. The talk show protests were broadcast online via the ManagerOnline web site, generating nearly a twofold increase in site visitors, from an average of 80,000 to 150,000 visitors per day.

Protests led by Sondhi took on an increasingly critical tone. At a protest in late February 2006, social activist and Buddhist lay leader Sulak Sivaraksa called Thaksin "a pitiful dog", while Auychai Watha, chairman of a north-eastern teachers' group, called for Thaksin's children to "become whores infected with venereal disease." The conduct of the protesters was condemned by the chairman of Amnesty International Thailand. Protesters often harassed journalists and news crews.

Sondhi was harshly criticized for attempting to use the King for his own benefit.

Nevertheless, Sondhi's income skyrocketed as a result of his political activism as the demonstration gained wider support from public. Revenues of his media companies increased by no less than 215 million baht (approx $6 million US) a month from the start of his protests to early 2006.

=== The Phra Phrom Erawan Shrine incident ===
In the early hours of 21 March 2006, 27-year-old Thanakorn Pakdeepol entered the popular Phra Phrom Erawan Shrine in central Bangkok and attacked the figure of Brahma with a hammer. After he destroyed the statue, he was immediately attacked and beaten to death by several people who witnesses it. Thanakorn had a history of mental illness and depression.

On his talk show the following day, Sondhi claimed that Thaksin Shinawatra had masterminded the destruction in order to replace the image of Brahma with a "dark force" aligned to Thaksin. Sondhi claimed Thaksin had hired Thanakorn through Khmer (Cambodian) black-magic shamans.

However, the vandal's father, Sayant Pakdeepol, denied the accusation and called Sondhi "the biggest liar I have ever seen". Thaksin called Sondhi's accusations "insane".

=== The Finland Plot ===
Starting in May 2006, Sondhi's Manager Daily newspaper published a series of articles on a movement called, "Finland Plot", claiming that Thaksin Shinawatra and former radical student leaders from the 1970s met in Finland in 1999 to create a plan to overthrow the Thai constitutional monarchy and establish a republic. No evidence was ever produced to support the existence of such a plot, and Thaksin and his Thai Rak Thai Party firmly denied the accusations. Thaksin sued Sondhi and several Manager Daily executives for defamation. Sondhi countered by saying that Thaksin was trying to silence the press.

== Post-2006 Coup ==
Sondhi and other leaders of People's Alliance for Democracy scheduled a massive demonstration against Thaksin on 20 September 2006. In the days preceding the demonstration, rumours spread that the protest would turn bloody. However, on 19 September 2006, the Thai military, led by General Sonthi Boonyaratglin, overthrew the Thaksin government, dissolved the Parliament, and abrogated the constitution. Thaksin, abroad at the time, was exiled indefinitely, and several members of his Cabinet were summoned for investigation. Sondhi's protest was cancelled, and the PAD later disbanded itself, claiming it was no longer needed.

Sondhi supported the coup, and later went on an international tour through London, Washington DC, and New York to celebrate with the PAD's expatriate supporters. During his trip, he also raised funds for the IPO of his satellite business, and explained that he had spent almost 420 million baht of his own money on the PAD campaign. He later announced that his political focus would be on educating the Thai public on how badly the Thaksin government had run the country. To accomplish this, Sondhi established the Thailand Watch Foundation (Yam Fau Paendin Foundation), a non-profit organization that provides financial support to part of his post-Thaksin efforts. He announced that he would end all of his public roles within five years.

Sondhi took a critical stance against the junta when it appointed a few cabinet members who had previously served as civil servants under the Thaksin government.

He later apologized in court to Chaisit Shinawatra, cousin of Thaksin, for claiming that the Shinawatra and Damapong families had "plundered" the nation, and that all of them were "lower than ****". Chaisit dropped litigation against Sondhi in return for the apology. The court has stated that by accusing a whole family, Sondhi could not be charged, which was an example of Thailand's bizarre legal system.

As a reward for his support, Sondhi was invited by the Council for National Security (the military junta that overthrew Thaksin's government) to air a political commentary show on government-run Channel 11. However, after critics and pressure, Sondhi cancelled his airing program.

Public protests against the junta began in the months after the coup. Sondhi and the People's Alliance for Democracy called the junta to use state-owned news media to "alert" the people to the "evil" of Thaksin Shinawatra and the aim of the demonstrators.

=== 2008 political crisis ===
As renewed protests by the PAD began against the elected government of Prime Minister Samak Sundaravej, Samak said, "I will never resign in response to these threats.I will not dissolve the House. I will meet the king today to report what's going on." He met with King Bhumibol Adulyadej at Hua Hin palace. For the 5th day, 30,000 protesters, led by the People's Alliance for Democracy, occupied Sundaravej's Government House compound in central Bangkok, forcing him and his advisers to work out of a military command post. Thai riot police entered the occupied compound and delivered a court order for the eviction of protesters. Chamlong Srimuang ordered 45 PAD guards to break into the main government building on Saturday. 3 regional airports remain closed and 35 trains between Bangkok and the provinces were cancelled. Protesters raided the Phuket International Airport tarmac on the resort island of Phuket Province resulting to 118 flights cancelled or diverted, affecting 15,000 passengers.

Protesters also blocked the entrance of the airports in Krabi and Hat Yai (which was later re-opened). Police issued arrest warrants for Sondhi Limthongkul and 8 other protest leaders on charges of insurrection, conspiracy, unlawful assembly and refusing orders to disperse. Meanwhile, Gen. Anupong Paochinda stated: "The army will not stage a coup. The political crisis should be resolved by political means." Samak and the Thai Party ruling coalition called urgent parliamentary debate and session for August 31.

== Allegations against the Sarasin family ==
On 27 April 2007, Sondhi claimed on his "Yam Fao Phaendin" (Guard of the Land) TV program that an amendment to the anti-corruption law passed by the National Legislative Assembly had been "stuck" for a month after being submitted for royal endorsement, and suggested the "delay" could be due to family ties between Arsa Sarasin (King Bhumibol's Principal Private Secretary) and Pong Sarasin (his eldest brother, a major shareholder in a company that Sondhi accused of acting as a nominee in the sale of Shin Corporation to Temasek Holdings).

The Office of His Majesty's Principal Private Secretary said in a public statement that Arsa had "has no connections whatsoever" with the issue, and that Sondhi made "incorrect allegations" against the royal secretary. "Sondhi's statement indicated that he failed to double-check the facts and had intended to frame and cause damage to Arsa Sarasin and the Office of His Majesty's Principal Private Secretary," said a letter sent to Sondhi.

Sondhi issued an apology a few days later, but also publicly warned Arsa that he had no right to use the office of the King's Principal Private Secretary to defend himself in a personal matter. He then accused the King's Principal Private Secretary of speaking with the Attorney General and the Police Commander in order to get charges of lese majeste against Thaksin Shinawatra dropped.

== Assassination attempt ==
Sondhi was reported to have been the target of an assassination attempt on the morning of 17 April 2009. Gunmen firing M-16 and AK-47 rifles shot out his tires at a petrol station in Bangkok and sprayed over 100 bullets into Sondhi's car, wounding Sondhi and seriously wounding his driver. The attackers escaped the scene when Sondhi's followers in another car opened fire on them. Sondhi suffered one wound to the head but was conscious, standing, and lucid before being sent to the hospital for surgery. Sondhi survived the surgery and was visited by relatives afterwards.

Sondhi's son, Jittanart Limthongkul, blamed factions within the military and the Abhisit government of being behind the assassination attempt:

A new form of war is emerging – it's being launched by the collusion of certain police and military officers. They are plotting a new coup. It is said that a minister, who is said to be involved in the attempted assassination of a privy councillor, is actively behind this new exercise.

Privy Councillor Charnchai Likitjitta had recently allegedly been the target of an assassination plot. The Criminal Court has issued an arrest warrant for a close aide to deputy prime minister and senior Democrat Party figure Sanan Kachornprasart, on the grounds that the aide masterminded the alleged assassination attempt on privy councillor Charnchai Likitjitta.

However, foreign minister and former PAD activist Kasit Piromya claimed that Thaksin was behind the assassination attempt:

Thaksin failed on the populist movement and now I think he has resorted to some sort of assassination attempt.

Kasit revealed that he had planned to have lunch with the Sondhi on the day of the attack. Kasit also claimed that himself, Abhisit, Finance Minister Korn Chatikavanij, and Deputy Prime Minister Suthep Thaugsuban were planned targets for assassination, and that he was guarded by several fully armed marines.

Meanwhile, Thaksin had the following to say:

It's [the Abhisit] government that has been given the license to kill [due to the state of emergency]. And I have the impression that the phase of "cut-off killings" has begun – in other words, they are eliminating anyone who knows too much about the conspiracy of those in power against me.

Army chief Anupong Paojinda said that the M16 rifle shells found at the scene were issued to the Royal Thai Army's 9th Infantry Division, which is under the First Army Region headquartered in Bangkok. Gen Anupong added that the rounds were from stores used for shooting practice, but that it would be very difficult to narrow down from which unit the ammunition actually came.

When questioned about the shooting, Sondhi said that he had "revealed the secrets of a lady who appears close to King Bhumibol" (ผมไปเปิดโปงสุภาพสตรีคนหนึ่ง ซึ่งในภาพแสดงออกว่าเป็นคนใกล้ชิดเบื้องพระยุคลบาท). He did not specify who he was referring to. He also claimed that sources had told him that four of the gunmen had already been "silenced" as of 3 May 2009.

== New Politics Party ==
On 7 October 2009. Sondhi has placed all rival political parties on notice following his election as the new leader of the New Politics Party and also elected the party's 25 executives, by about 2,300 out of some 8,900 members of the party gathered at the Thunderdome stadium at Muang Thong Thani. While interim leader Somsak Kosaisuuk, withdrew their respective nominations to pave way for Sondhi's victory.

Among the elected executives are Somsak as deputy party leader, Suriyasai Katasila as secretary-general, Pratheep Chuenarom as treasurer and Samran Rodphet as spokesman. Apart from the executive board, the party also unveiled its team of advisors which include Sompong Sujaritkul, Chai-Anan Samudavanija, Udon Tontisunthorn, Sompoj Piyaui, Pipob Thongchai, Parnthep Puvanartnurak, Samart Sotesatit, Arthit Urairat, Pichai Ratanadilok, Suwinai Pornvalai, Chavin Leenabanjong, Sombat Bensirimongkol, Prayoon Akrabavorn, Ammarin Korma and Somsak Ismanyee. Then Sondhi stated that the conference marks a new chapter for the Thai politics, and also claims that the NPP and the PAD are one of the same, the PAD can no longer take on the streets to protest do not understand the fundamental of democracy as the NPSP is merely an instrumental of the PAD, the sacrifices of the PAD must be passed on to the party's cause. Therefore, party members, leader, executive members and MPs must also sacrifice for their belief. The PAD has been beaten, shot at and have bombs thrown at but they did not give up because they have faith.

Lastly, Sondhi claimed that they are not looking to challenge other political parties. They are only challenging themselves to bring on the new politics through honesty, bravery, and diligence to bring change to the Thai society for the future generation.

== Convicted and jailed for fraud ==
On 28 February 2012, Sondhi was convicted by a Bangkok Criminal Court of violating the Securities and Exchange Act by falsifying documents to secure a multimillion-dollar loan for his media empire, a case dating back to the 1990s. He was handed the maximum sentence possible.

The Security and Exchange Commission accused him of falsifying documents used as collateral for a loan amounting to almost 1.1bn baht ($36m, £22.7m) for his media business. Sondhi pleaded guilty but was freed on bail pending an appeal against the sentence.

On 6 September 2016, the Supreme Court of Thailand ruled that he, with other three executives of the Manager Media Group Co. he founded, must serve the 20 years in prison sentence ruled by the Appeals Court in 2012. The sentence, according to the Supreme Court, will not be suspended. In the same morning, after the verdict, Sondhi Limthongkul was sent to prison. He was released from jail early on 4 September 2019 on royal pardon.

== Convicted of insulting the monarchy ==
On 1 October 2013, Sondhi was declared guilty of lèse majesté for quoting remarks made by an opponent protesting the 2008 resumption of PAD protests. The appeals court in so doing reversed a lower court acquittal (Thailand has no bar to double jeopardy) handed down on 26 September 2012. The lèse majesté had resulted from Sondhi's having quoted remarks made Daranee Chanchoengsilpakul. Daranee "Da Torpedo" was sentenced in April 2009 to 18 years in prison without suspension for "intending to insult" Bhumibol and Sirikit. "Da Torpedo" had not actually mentioned the monarchs, but had criticized, among other things, the "ruling class." The court in 2009 had held that the prosecution had "brought evidence that makes it possible to interpret that the defendant meant the King and Queen Sirikit." The 2013 ruling reversing Sondhi's 2012 acquittal upholds prosecution for whatever words Sondhi had quoted, but for much less than "18 years in prison without suspension." Sondhi was sentenced to two years imprisonment for defaming the monarchy, then released after posting 500,000 baht ($15,935) in bail.

== See also ==
- Muangthai Raisabdah
- Media in Thailand
- Sondhi may face legal action from Thai Rak Thai party. Wikinews, February 12, 2006
- Sondhi continues using Thailand Weekly show to attack PM. Wikinews, January 14, 2006
- Thai PM sues media critic for one billion Baht. Wikinews, November 17, 2005
- Thai political talk show taken off air. Wikinews, September 15, 2005
