= Nick Nostitz =

Nikolaus Freiherr von Nostitz (born 1968), known by his professional name Nick Nostitz, is a German photographer who is a member of the Silesian branch of the noble Nostitz family . He has lived and worked in Bangkok since 1993. Fluent in the Thai language, Nostitz is noted for specializing in what he considers to be the "lower levels" of the country's society seldom seen by casual visitors.

== History ==
Nostitz used black-and-white photographs to depict both the allure and sadness connected with the Thai sex industry in his 2001 book Patpong: Bangkok's Twilight Zone (ISBN 0-9537438-2-9). In 2004, he documented the violent war of then Prime Minister Thaksin Shinawatra against alleged drug dealers with a series of photographs. His work has appeared in several leading European magazines, such as Stern and Der Spiegel.

He is currently producing a series of books on Thailand's political troubles in the aftermath of the 2006 coup. This started with Red vs Yellow Volume 1: Thailand's Crisis of Identity, published by White Lotus Press in 2009. It was followed in 2011 by Red vs Yellow Volume 2: Thailand's Political Awakening which covers the rise of the red shirt movement in 2009 and also published by White Lotus Press.

On 25 November 2013, during the People's Democratic Reform Committee demonstrations in Bangkok, he was attacked by PRDC supporters that accused him of being pro-Red Shirt. He thereafter suffered from a hate campaign and narrowly escaped a kidnapping attempt by PDRC supporters on 7 May 2014. He received death threats and almost stopped his professional work in Bangkok after the 2014 Thai coup d'état.

== Private life ==
On 21 December 2014, Nostitz launched a request for donations campaign on his Facebook page, which was also publicly shared by friends. He said he was planning to return to Germany but was sliding "into a very difficult situation", since he had long been unable to work and even now, as an example, did not dare to travel in the south of Thailand because that is the PDRC draws its main support. He and his wife were waiting on the adoption process for their 10-year-old son, who had been raised by them since he was seven months old. "Despite an application for adoption almost 2 years ago, massive disappearances in the procedure had almost eaten up all my savings. ... At the moment I only have enough money for a maximum of 3 – 4 months to live in Thailand, which will probably not be enough for the most complex bureaucratic processes of adoption and settlement."
