= Somkiat Pongpaiboon =

Thai politician (1950–2021)

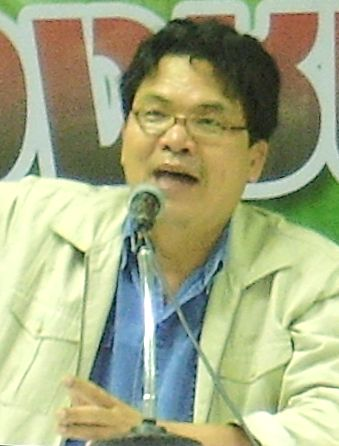
Somkiat Pongpaiboon in a seminar

Somkiat Pongpaiboon (Thai script: สมเกียรติ พงษ์ไพบูลย์; 12 January 1950 – 14 November 2021) was a Thai Professor at Nakhon Ratchasima Rajabhat University, Nakhon Ratchasima Province, Thailand. He became a member of the Thai House of Representatives in 2007 from Democrat Party and a leader of the People's Alliance for Democracy, and the co-founder of the New Politics Party. Somkiat was an advocate for the poor and a major critic of Prime Minister Thaksin Shinawatra.

== New Politics Party ==
In May 2009, Somkiat and other PAD leaders established the New Politics Party. Somkiat claimed that "Our objective is to campaign against Thaksinomics." The party unconventionally planned not to field MP candidates for the first 5 years, while Somkiat claimed that "If we field MP candidates, we will be trapped in vicious circles of money politics." Other party co-founders included former Palang Dharma Party leader Chaiwat Sinsuwong and the Campaign for Popular Democracy's Pipob Thongchai.

== Death ==
Somkiat died on 14 November 2021 from cerebral hemorrhage at Maharat Nakhon Ratchasima Hospital.
