= Suriyasai Katasila =

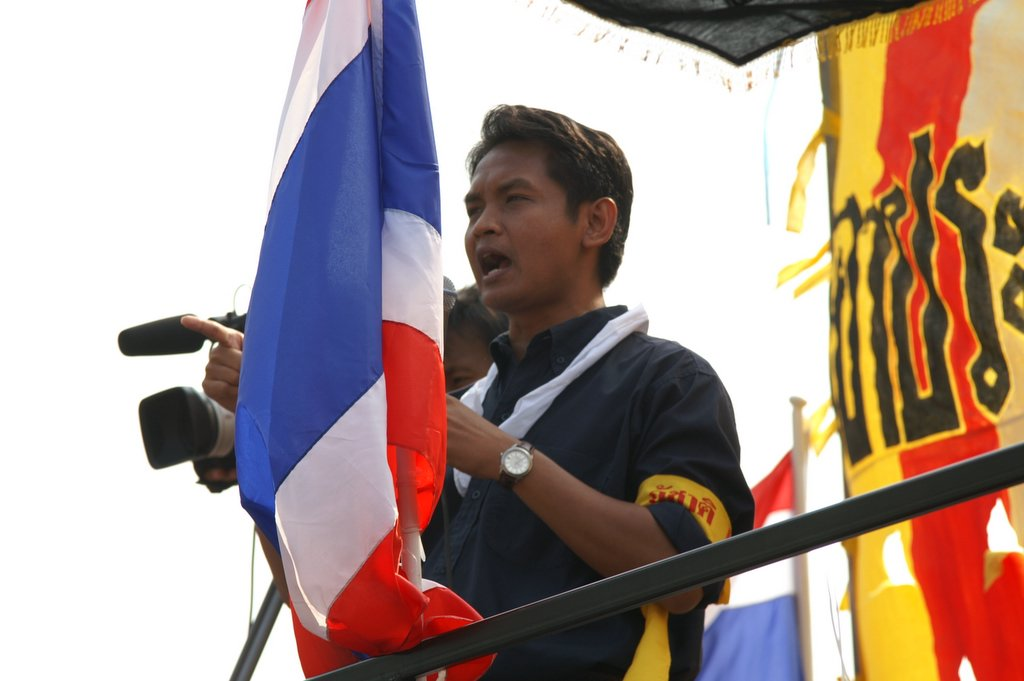
- Suriyasai Katasila was speaking on the PAD stage in 2006
- Born: Suriyasai Katasila; March 27, 1972 (age 54); Rasi Salai, Sisaket, Thailand
- Other name: Yasai
- Citizenship: Thai
- Education: Kasetsart University; Rangsit University
- Occupations: Academic; activist; politician
- Years active: 1990s–present
- Political party: New Politics (2009–2011); Action Coalition for Thailand (2018–2019)

Suriyasai Katasila (Thai: สุริยะใส กตะศิลา) is a Thai political scientist, activist and former politician, who is currently the dean of the College of Social Innovation and director of the Thailand Reform Institute AT Rangsit University.

Katasila was born in Rasi Salai district, Sisaket province, in Isan. He developed an interest in politics since a very young age, recalling the 1981 Thai military rebellion.

While a student at Kasetsart University, he had participated in Black May, a mass protest where people gathered to oust the junta government led by Suchinda Kraprayoon in 1992. During that time, he was also the secretary-general of Student Union of Thailand (SUT).

In contemporary political history, Katasila is best known for being the coordinator of the People's Alliance for Democracy (PAD), or familiarly known as Yellow Shirts. Political groups that played a key role in the ousting of the Thaksin Shinawatra government in 2006 and the Samak Sundaravej with Somchai Wongsawat governments in 2008.

He was the secretary-general of a New Politics Party founded by the PAD leaders in 2009.

In February 2019, shortly before that years' general election. He was one of the co-founders and a candidate in the seventh list of MPs for the Action Coalition for Thailand Party, a political party founded by the leaders of the People's Democratic Reform Committee (PDRC). He was stripped of his political rights for 10 years and sentenced to 87 days in prison for a political rally by the PAD in 2008.
