= Manager Daily =

Thai newspaper

- Type: Daily
- Format: Broadsheet
- Founder: Sondhi Limthongkul
- Language: Thai
- Website: mgronline.com

Manager Daily (Thai: ผู้จัดการรายวัน; RTGS: phu chat kan rai wann) is a Thai-language daily newspaper published in Bangkok and distributed nationwide. It is the second best-selling newspaper in Thailand. Manager Daily 360 Degree has a circulation in excess of 850,000 copies.

== History ==
Manager Daily was founded by media mogul Sondhi Limthongkul, who also launched the satellite broadcasting channel ASTV. It is part of the Manager Group, which also includes the Asia Times newspaper, based in Hong Kong.

== See also ==
- Media of Thailand
