= Asia Times =

News company based in Hong Kong

- Editor-in-chief: Uwe Parpart
- Managing editor: Shawn W. Crispin
- Opinion editor: David Simmons
- Headquarters: Hong Kong
- ISSN: 1833-9638
- Website: asiatimes.com

Asia Times (Chinese: 亞洲時報), formerly known as Asia Times Online, is a Hong Kong-based English language news media publishing group, covering politics, economics, business, and culture from an Asian perspective. Asia Times publishes in English and simplified Chinese.

Alongside its news coverage, Asia Times publishes analysis and commentary on geopolitics, international relations and security by academics, researchers, policy practitioners and other subject-matter experts.

== History ==
The Hong Kong website is self-described successor to Bangkok-based print newspaper Asia Times that was launched in 1995 and closed in mid-1997, using the domain asiatimes.com.

Asia Times Online was created early in 1999, at atimes.com, describing itself as a successor in "publication policy and editorial outlook" to the print newspaper Asia Times, owned by Sondhi Limthongkul, a Thai media mogul and leader of the People's Alliance for Democracy, who later sold his business.

The new publishing company is Asia Times Holdings Limited, incorporated and registered in Hong Kong. Many reporters from the Asia Times print edition continued their careers as journalists, and a group of those contributors created Asia Times Online as a successor to the Asia Times. The word "Online" is no longer part of the website news portal.

In 2006, The New York Times described Asia Times Online as "one of the most prominent of the [English-language] regional publications" covering Asia.

The site was relaunched with a new logo and design in October 2016 with Uwe Parpart as editor. Other executives include Cecil Ho, former chief financial officer of ReOrient Group Limited.

The site was again relaunched in February 2019 with a refreshed web design, multiple languages and a domain name change to asiatimes.com. According to its "About" page, Asia Times has "two main newsrooms and social media hubs ... in Bangkok and Hong Kong ... supported by bureaus in Seoul, Beijing, Singapore, and New York".
