= Chatchai Sukhawadee =

Thai singer (born 1956)

- ชัชชัย สุขขาวดี
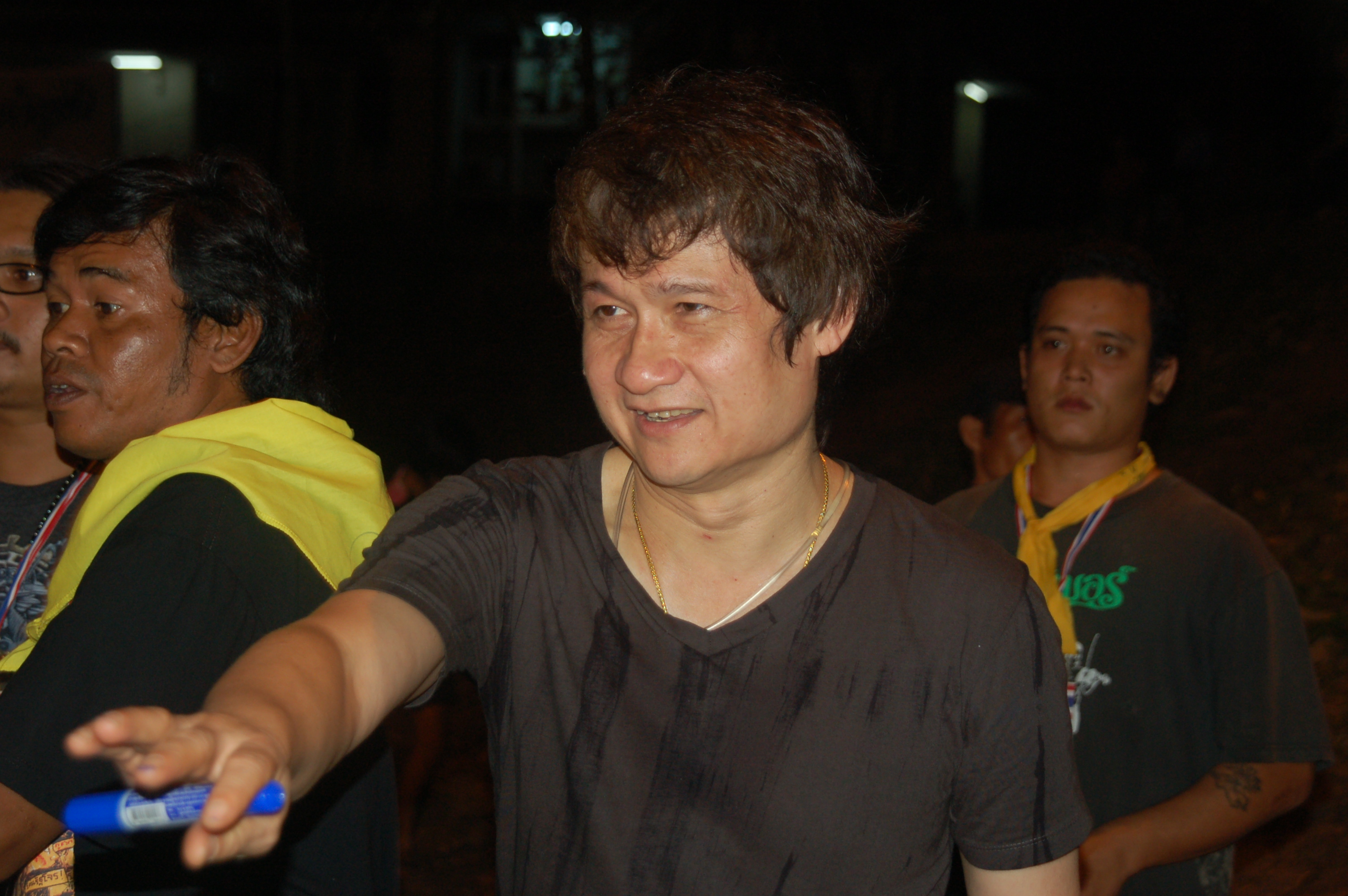
- Sukhawadee in 2006
- Born: 29 August 1956 (age 69); Surat Thani Province, Thailand
- Other names: "Rang Rockestra" (Thai: หรั่ง ร็อคเคสตร้า)
- Occupations: Singer; Songwriter; Musician
- Musical career
- Genres: T-Rock; Heavy metal; hard rock; progressive rock; pop rock; speed metal
- Instruments: Vocal · Synthesizer
- Years active: 1970s–present
- Labels: Nititad Promotion · Rod Fai Don Tri · RS Promotion

Chatchai Sukhawadee (Thai: ชัชชัย สุขขาวดี; 29 August 1956 –), nicknamed Rang (Thai: หรั่ง), more widely known by his stage name Rang Rockestra (Thai: หรั่ง ร็อคเคสตร้า), is a Thai rock singer-songwriter and a former lead vocalist of the Thai rock bands M7 and Rockestra. His voice is known for its high-pitched and powerful tone.

He gained recognition after his first studio album Technology was released in 1984 by Nititad Promotion. His popularity increased after his solo studio album Wai Kwa Saeng was released in 1991 by RS Promotion, with its third single, "Miss You (คิดถึง/Kid Teung)".

== Early life ==
He was born in Surat Thani Province. He became interested in music as a youth. In 1968, he attended Royal Thai Navy School of Music, playing drum set, trumpet and synthesizer. He was commissioned as a military officer and became a lead vocal of Royal Thai Navy Military band, He resigned from Royal Thai Navy in 2013.

== Career ==
He started on stage during Thailand during the Vietnam War. He joined with musical band M7 as a trumpet player. His band played for American military officers who were stationed in Thailand. After that, he resigned from M7, and joined Rockestra in 1982. His popular songs as a membership of Rockestra include "Technology" (เทคโนโลยี) and "Shadow (Run)" (เงา (วิ่ง)). Rockestra was marketed by Nititad Promotion for four years. He moved to Rod Fai Don Tri (Music Train) in 1986. After that, he resigned from Rockestra.

In 1991, he moved to RS Promotion as a solo singer. He recorded four albums with RS Promotion: Rock Tem Rak (ร็อกเต็มรัก/1991), Wai Kwa Saeng (ไวกว่าแสง/1991), Rak Tang Miti (รักต่างมิติ/1993) and Untitled (1996). His most popular single from Wai Kwa Saeng, "Miss You" in 1991. He returned to popularity with his first single, "Totally Used" (หลอกใช้/Lok Chai), from Rak Tang Miti. He played in Short Charge Shock Rock Concert in the same year alongside Hi-Rock and SMF.

== Personal life ==
He married and the couple have a daughther, Metal Sukkhao, Thai singer and actress.

He supported People's Alliance for Democracy against Thaksin Shinawatra. He protested on many occasions, and he sang "Love You Thailand" (รักเธอประเทศไทย) for PAD, until he was no longer allowed to sing it in 2020.

== Discography ==
=== As solo singer ===
Music Train

- Dao See Muang (1988)
- Mod Khan Fai (1989)

RS Promotion

- Rock Tem Rak (1991)
- Wai Kwa Saeng (1991)
- Rak Tang Miti (1993)
- Untitled (1996)

== See also ==
- Pathompong Sombatpiboon
- Surush Tubwang
- Thanapol Intharit
- Itti Balangura
