= People's Alliance for Democracy =

Reactionary political movement in Thailand (2005–2013)

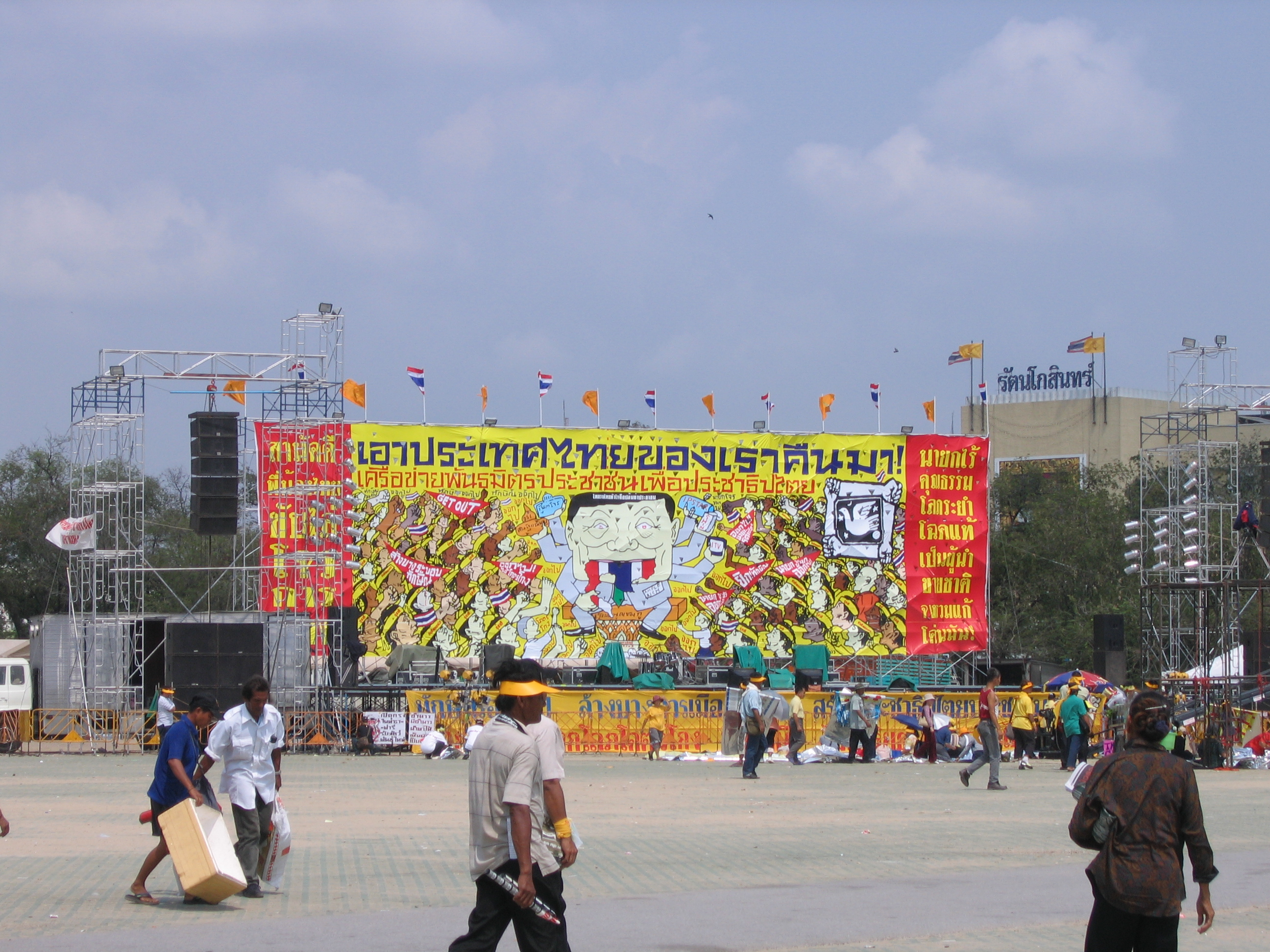
- Founded: 11 February 2006
- Dissolved: 23 August 2013
- Type: Pressure group Political group
- Purpose: Dissolve the "Thaksinomics policy"
- Region served: Thailand
- Key people: Sondhi Limthongkul; Chamlong Srimuang; Pipob Thongchai; Somsak Kosaisuuk; Somkiat Pongpaiboon

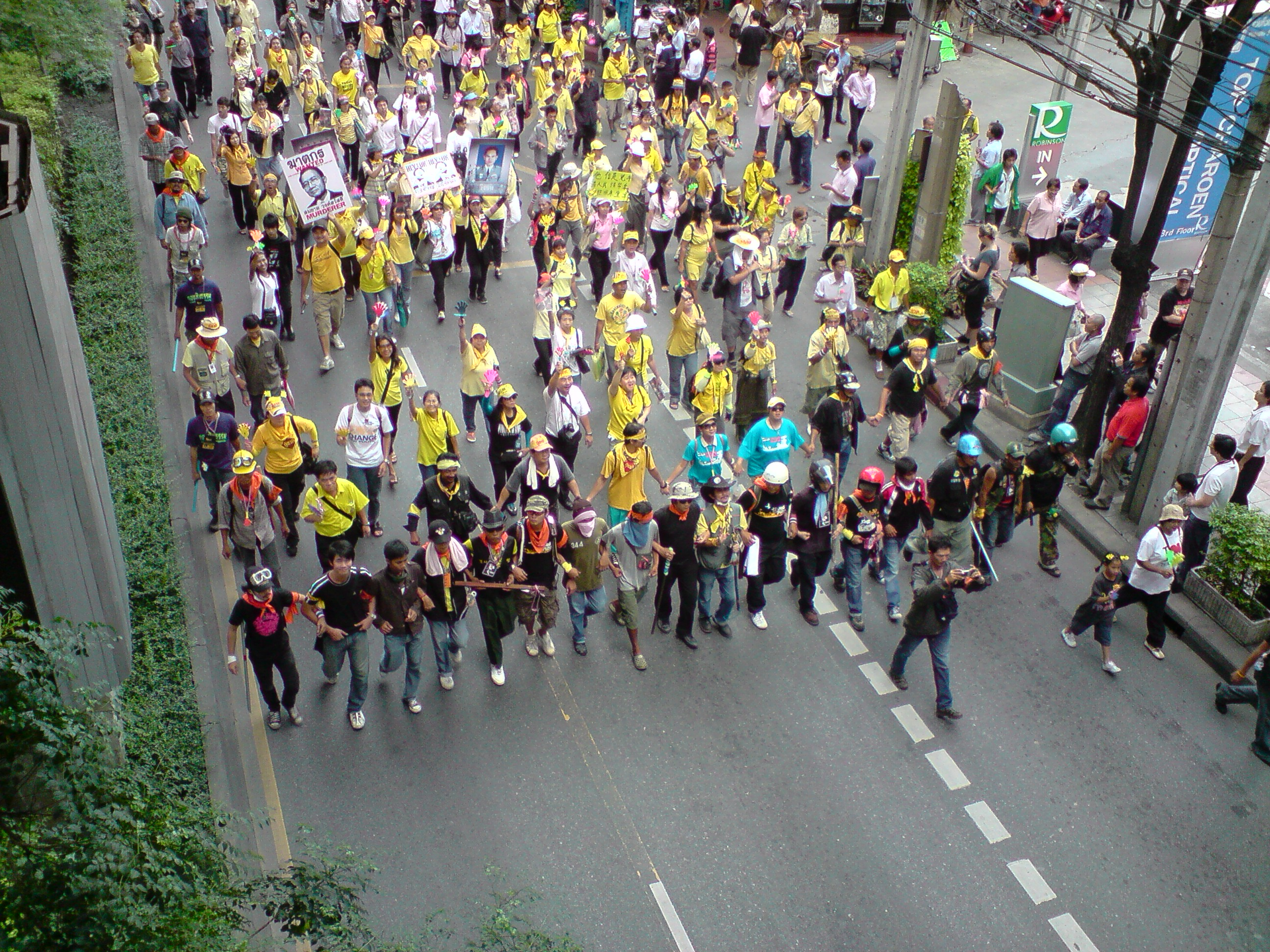
PAD rally at Sukhumvit Road in August 2008

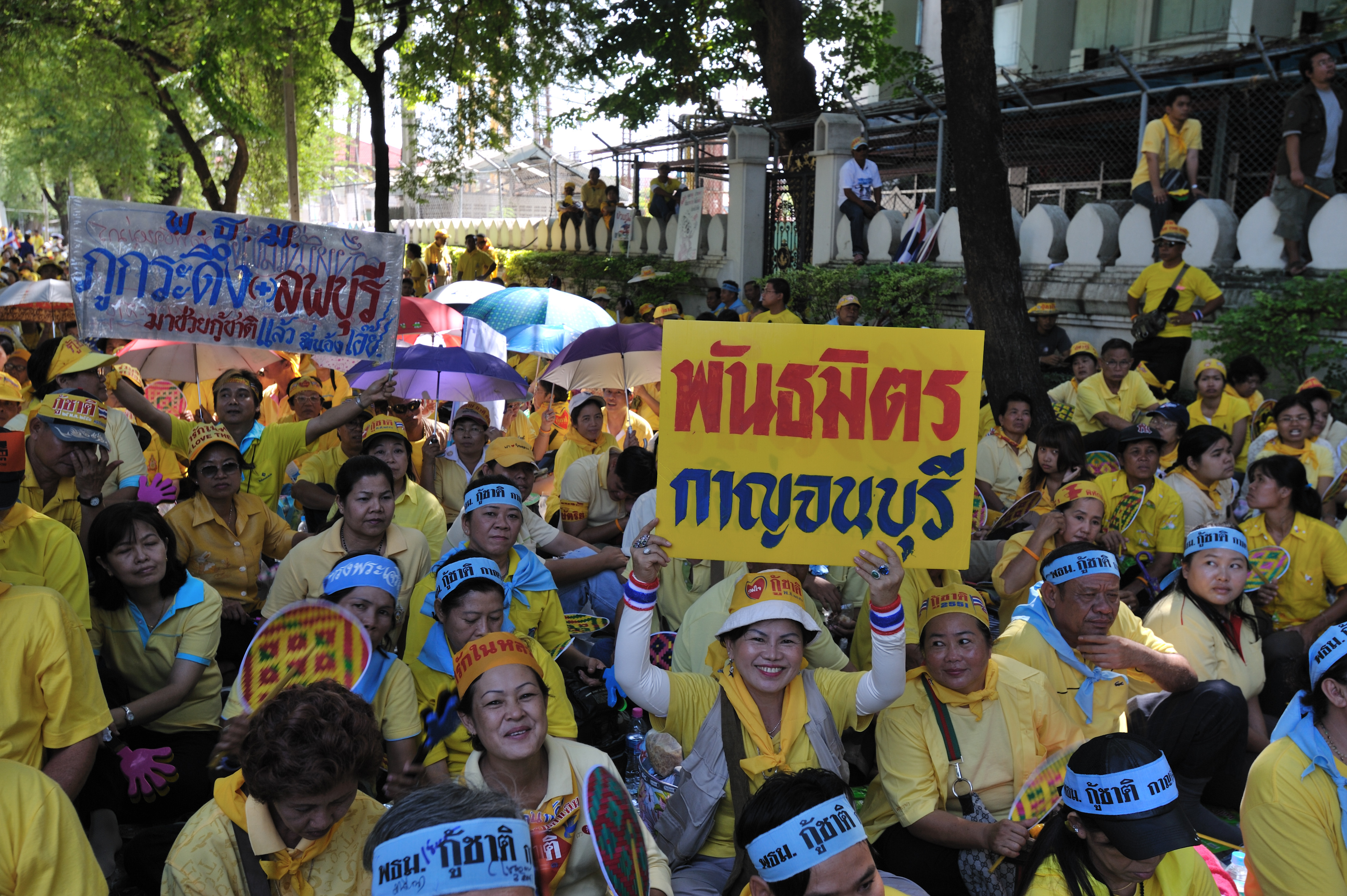
PAD supporters in 2008 protests

The People's Alliance for Democracy (PAD; Thai: พันธมิตรประชาชนเพื่อประชาธิปไตย, romanized: Phanthamit Prachachon Phuea Prachathipatai; commonly known as "Yellow Shirts") was a Thai reactionary, monarchist political movement and pressure group. It was originally a coalition of protesters against Thaksin Shinawatra, the former Prime Minister of Thailand.

Its leaders included media-mogul Sondhi Limthongkul and Major General Chamlong Srimuang. The PAD was a chief player in the political crisis of 2005–2006, the 2008 crisis, and the Cambodian–Thai border stand-off. Its membership consisted mainly of ultra-royalist middle-class and working-class Bangkok residents and anti-Thaksin Southerners, supported by some factions of the Thai Army, some leaders of Democrat Party, and the members of the state-enterprise labor unions.

People's Alliance for Democracy announced to end the political role on August 23, 2013.

== Name ==
The movement is also called the National Liberation Alliance (กลุ่มพันธมิตรกู้ชาติ, Klum Phanthamit Ku Chat), the Thai Patriots Network, or more commonly the Yellow Shirts (เสื้อเหลือง, Suea Lueang).

== General information ==
The PAD was formed to lead demonstrations against the government of Thaksin Shinawatra, whom they accused of being anti-monarchy. Two days after a military junta's 2006 military coup overthrew Thaksin's interim government (between elections), the PAD voluntarily dissolved after announcing its goals had been accomplished. The PAD re-established itself after Thaksin-affiliated parties, led by Samak Sundaravej's People's Power Party (PPP), won a plurality in the 2007 general election. In May 2008, PAD again began street protests and in August seized Government House to pressure Samak's coalition government to resign. PAD supporters also seized airports in Phuket, Krabi, and Hat Yai and blocked major roads and highways. Sympathetic state-enterprise labour unions assisted by stopping train services across the kingdom and threatened to shut off electricity and water services to non-PAD supporters. Armed PAD forces "Srivichai Warriors" seized a government television broadcaster as well as several government ministries. Violence between PAD supporters and anti-PAD protesters left dozens injured and one PAD protester dead. Wealthy PAD supporters threatened a bank run that could destabilize the Thai financial system if the Samak government did not resign.

PAD's protests escalated after the Constitutional Court found Samak guilty of violating a law which prohibits government ministers from receiving a salary from another job. PAD forces surrounded Parliament and used razor wire barricades to prevent the legislature from meeting to hear Samak's replacement, Thaksin's brother-in-law Somchai Wongsawat, formally announce his policies. Police used force to disperse the protesters, resulting in hundreds of serious injuries and the death of a young woman, all caused by the explosions of Chinese-made tear gas grenades, which the poorly trained police fired directly at the protesters. As a result, the PAD formally renounced non-violence and vowed bloody revenge. In November, the PAD blockaded Parliament prior to a crucial legislative session, used hijacked public buses to take control of the government's provisional offices at Don Mueang International Airport, and seized control of Suvarnabhumi International Airport. The PAD also threatened to lay siege to the seaports of the Eastern Seaboard. The PAD's sieges and protests ended after the Constitutional Court dissolved the PPP, banned its leaders from politics, and Army Commander Anuphong Phaochinda pressured many PPP MPs to defect to the Democrat Party and elect Abhisit Vejjajiva as Premier. PAD activist Kasit Piromya was appointed Foreign Minister in the new government.

The PAD called en masse for the resignations of Thaksin, Samak Sundaravej, and Somchai Wongsawat, whom the PAD accused of being proxies for Thaksin. Sondhi originally proposed Somchai as an acceptable alternative to Samak. However, when Somchai replaced Samak, the PAD refused to stop its protests, noting that Somchai is Thaksin's brother-in-law. At the height of the sieges, the PAD openly stated that the only person they would accept as premier was Abhisit. PAD leader Khamnoon Sitthisamarn called Abhisit's premiership a "genuine PAD victory" and a "Anuphong-style coup d'état".

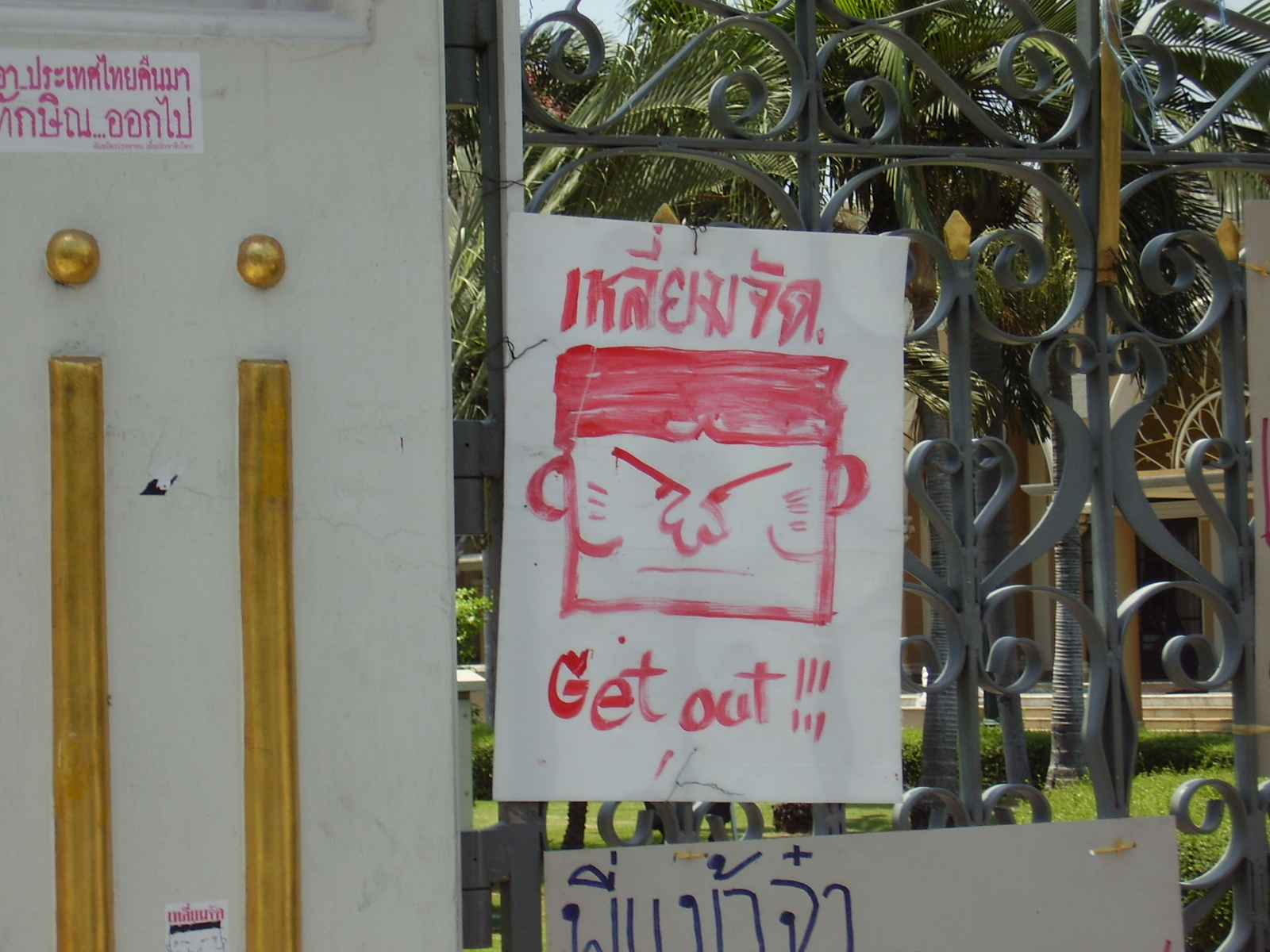
PAD rally to oust Thaksin Shinawatra at the Thai Government House

Citing the claimed failure of popular democracy in Thailand, the PAD has suggested constitutional amendments that would make parliament a largely royally appointed body. It was strongly opposed to Thaksin's populist economic policies and attempts to decentralize political power. The Asian Human Rights Commission has noted of the PAD and their agenda that, "although they may not describe themselves as fascist, have fascist qualities." The PAD is largely composed of royalists, has regularly invoked king Bhumibol Adulyadej in its protests, and has claimed that its enemies are disloyal to the monarchy. It has openly called for the military and Thailand's traditional elite to take a greater role in politics. The PAD is fiercely anti-Cambodian, with PAD leader and Foreign Minister Kasit Piromya calling Cambodian Prime Minister Hun Sen a "gangster" or "tramp", "deranged", and speculated that he was a "slave" of Thaksin.

== Origins and leadership ==
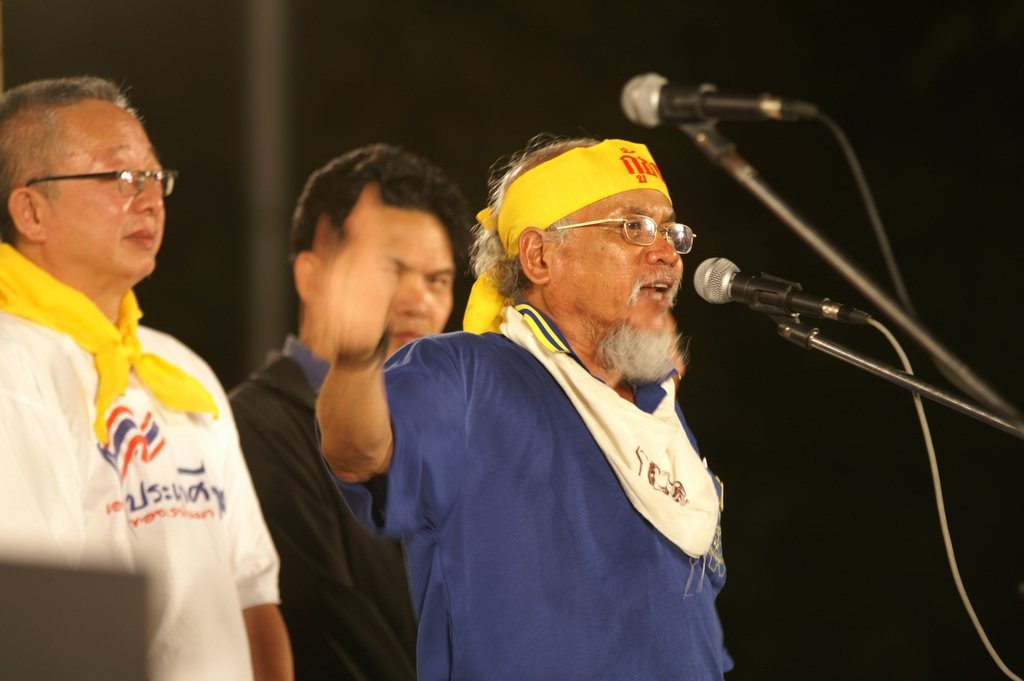
Sondhi Limthongkul (left), Somsak Kosaisuuk (right)

The People's Alliance for Democracy had its source in weekly public tapings of Sondhi Limthongkul's weekly political talk show 'Muang Thai Rai Sapda' (Thailand Weekly). Attendance grew after the talkshow was dropped by MCOT Channel 9 and Sondhi started webcasting the show on his website. As the tone grew more controversial, the tapings gradually turned into protests against the government. The PAD was formally established on February 8, 2006, after Thaksin's family sold shares in Shin Corp to Temasek Holdings. The PAD saw the transactions as a proof of a conflict of interest.

The central committee of the PAD consisted of:

- Media mogul Sondhi Limthongkul
- Major General Chamlong Srimuang, former governor of Bangkok, leader of the Palang Dharma Party, spokesman of the Confederation for Democracy (1992 oppositional movement)
- Activist Phiphob Thongchai (Campaign for Popular Democracy)
- State enterprise labor union leader Somsak Kosaisuuk, former spokesman of the Confederation for Democracy
- University lecturer Somkiat Pongpaiboon, activist of the Assembly of the Poor

Besides the five leaders, ten others form the PAD management committee: Pitaya Wongkul, Rewadee Prasertcharoensuuk, Rosana Tositrakul, Chaiwat Sindhuwong, Preeda Tiasuwan, Sirichai Maingam, Suwit Watnuu, Kochawan Chaiyabut, Weerapol Sopa, Ouychai Wata.

Other leaders include famous entertainer Sarunyoo Wongkrachang and Campaign for Popular Democracy leader Suriyasai Katasila. Several current and former employees of Sondhi played a role, including Panthep Puapongbhant, Khamnoon Sitthisaman, Samran Rodpetch, Sarocha Pornudomsak, Anchalee Paireerak, Yuthayong Limlertwatee, and Torpong Sewatarm.

== Supporters ==
PAD protesters initially consisted mostly of middle to upper-class residents of Bangkok. These included prominent socialites (dubbed the "Blue Blood Jet Set" by the Bangkok Post) and some little known minor members of the Thai royal family. The PAD's support base has since expanded to include civil servants, state enterprise labor unions, the urban middle-class of other cities, conservative Buddhist groups, Southerners and the so-called "elite". Except for the South, PAD has mainly urban support in contrast to Thaksin, whose base has been essentially rural.

Buddhist groups supporting the PAD include the Santi Asoke sect and their "Dharma Army" (led by Thaksin's former mentor Chamlong Srimuang).

General Pathompong Kesornsuk, a close aid of Privy Council President Prem Tinsulanonda, appeared in full uniform at PAD protests and urged his fellow soldiers to follow suit. The Army openly ignored government orders to evict the PAD from Government House, Don Muang Airport, and Suvarnabhumi Airport. Former Army Commander Anupong Paochinda publicly called for the government to resign several times, though he also asked the PAD to leave the airports.

The PAD dress in yellow, the royal color, and claim they are defending King Bhumibol Adulyadej and the monarchy against the alleged disloyalty of Thaksin. Bhumibol has remained completely neutral, though Queen Sirikit did attend the cremation of a young PAD woman killed by a police grenade at a protest and described her as a "good girl" and a "protector of the monarchy and the country". However, HRH Princess Sirindhorn, when asked at a US press conference if she thought the PAD was acting on behalf of the monarchy, replied: "I don't think so. They do things for themselves."

In the past, many PAD members received financial support from their leader, Sondhi Limthongkul.

=== Political proposals ===
The PAD state they stand for honest politics, promoting justice and the rule of law, while fighting against corruption among politicians and civil servants. They also claim to be upholding the constitutional monarchy and oppose those they view as wanting to change the monarchy's status. Two days after the 2006 Thai coup d'état, the PAD voluntarily disbanded after announcing its goals had been accomplished.

"Representative democracy is not suitable for Thailand," commented Sondhi Limthongkul, claiming the electoral system has repeatedly elected corrupt, populist governments. To correct this, the PAD proposed what it called "New Politics" and on 2 June 2009, founded the New Politics Party. Although most of its leaders supported, and in some cases helped draft the post-coup 2007 Constitution, the PAD proposed constitutional amendments that would make 70% of MPs appointed, based on professional groups, with elections choosing only 30%. On 21 September, the PAD changed its formula to 100% elections, but with 50% of Parliament voted for by geographic area and the rest voted for by occupational representatives.

=== Nationalism ===
The PAD has been described as "hyper-nationalist" and is strongly opposed to what it claims are infringements upon the national sovereignty of Thailand. It opposed the Samak government's decision to support the Cambodian government's unilateral application for the listing of Preah Vihear as a World Heritage site, since land next to the temple is still in dispute. PAD charged the PPP-led cabinet with helping Thaksin Shinawatra to make large profits with Cambodia by using this agreement as an exchange. It also called for Thai investors to withdraw from Cambodia, the closure of all 40 Thai-Cambodian border checkpoints, a ban on all flights from Thailand to Phnom Penh and Siem Reap, the construction of a naval base at Koh Kut near the border, and abolishing the committee which oversees demarcation of overlapping sea areas and a unilateral declaration of a Thai marine map.

=== Government system proposals ===
In contrast to Thaksin, who claimed he wanted to elevate Thailand to the developed world, Sondhi advocates an anti-materialistic, "reasonable society" with as little as possible consumer debt and little concern over "how many cars or washing machines" people own. The PAD favors limits on foreign investment, opposes privatization of state enterprises, and is generally skeptical of foreign investment. "Don't impose a free trade, consumer-oriented society on Thailand," noted Sondhi in an interview.

While Thaksin and Samak championed voters in rural areas and in the agricultural sector with their "dual-track" economic policies that combined populist policies such as universal healthcare with greater participation in the global economy, the PAD in contrast are hardline monetarists. They propose interest rate hikes to reduce public debt, and cutting down spending on populist welfare projects and "mega-projects".

=== Demand for royal intervention ===
Amid rising political tensions, Thaksin dissolved Parliament on 24 February 2006, just one year after being re-elected. He called for new House elections on 2 April. In March, the PAD requested the King intervene and remove Thaksin from power. The PAD claimed that royal intervention was the only possible peaceful answer to the political crisis. The King rejected the idea in a speech on April 26, saying: "Asking for a Royally appointed prime minister is undemocratic. It is, pardon me, a mess. It is irrational."

== 2008 re-establishment ==
The People's Alliance for Democracy was re-established in Thailand on March 28, 2008, at Thammasat University auditorium. Several issues were raised by the PAD, including the Prime Minister Samak Sundaravej's ties to Thaksin Shinawatra, ties between some People's Power Party members and the banned-Thai Rak Thai party, alleged interference in the justice system, and attempts to amend the 2007 Constitution.

Among the changes proposed as constitutional amendments were the removal of Article 237, which necessitated the dissolution of a political party if one of the executives was involved in vote buying. Yongyuth Tiyapairat, the People's Power Party executive who was also the parliamentary president after the election, was being tried for vote buying. Yongyuth was later found guilty by the Supreme Court on July 8, 2008.

Several key persons involved in cases against Thaksin and the People's Power Party were removed from their posts for interfering with the justice system. This includes Sunai Manomai-udom, then Department of Special Investigation (DSI) director-general working in the case about Thaksin's asset concealment charges, Seripisut Temiyavet, then National Police chief who was installed by the coup but is well known for taking on mafias including those in the police, and Chaiwat Changkaokam, then the head of Tambon Chanchawa who was the key witness to Yongyuth Tiyapairat's alleged vote buying.

Demonstrations and street protests by PAD restarted on May 25, 2008, at Democracy Monument on Ratchadamnoen Road. The PAD supporters amassed to protest against the proposed constitutional amendments. The rally attracted ten thousand supporters. However pro-government supporters gathering nearby started attacking PAD protesters. The clash was the first between the two groups, and many were wounded on both sides. The plan was to march the supporters from Democracy Monument to the front of Government House. However, the crowd was stopped by a large police barrier at Makkhawan Rangsan Bridge. PAD settled at Makkhawan Rangsan Bridge and staged continuous rally there.

As the rally went on, the PAD announced their effort to collect signatures to request the removal of members of the House of Representatives and Senators who supported the amendment on May 30, 2008. The next day Samak expressed on government-run NBT television channel his intention to dissolve the rally by force. In reaction to Samak's speech, the PAD issued announcements against the government's move.

=== Preah Vihear issue ===
PAD opposed Noppadon Pattama's move to allow Cambodia to singly apply Preah Vihear as World Heritage Site. As it lies near the Thai-Cambodia border with land surrounding the temple still under dispute, many scholars feared Thailand would lose sovereignty over the land surrounding the site and preferred the site to be listed jointly between Cambodia and Thailand. It is also claimed that the hidden motive behind them was to exchange for oil and gas concessions to Chevron. Noppadon proceeded to sign the Thai-Cambodia Joint Communique on June 18, 2008. Thailand Administrative court issue injunction against the action on June 28 and them found the agreement to be unconstitutional on July 8, 2008. However, UNESCO awarded World Heritage Site to Cambodia later on the same day.

=== Moving the PAD stage ===
On June 20, 2008, PAD and supporters made through police blockades and successfully gathered in front of Government House, an effort to pressure the government to resign. Both police and PAD declared victory as violence was avoided. However, the Prime Minister was not pleased.

The new PAD stage blocked Phitsanulok and Rama V roads, causing inconvenience to schools in the area. Other problems include loud speaker noise. Teachers and parents of Ratchawinit Secondary School filed lawsuit against PAD, which PAD appealed and lost. PAD moved its stage back to Makkhawan Rangsan Bridge on July 8.

=== Siege of Government House ===
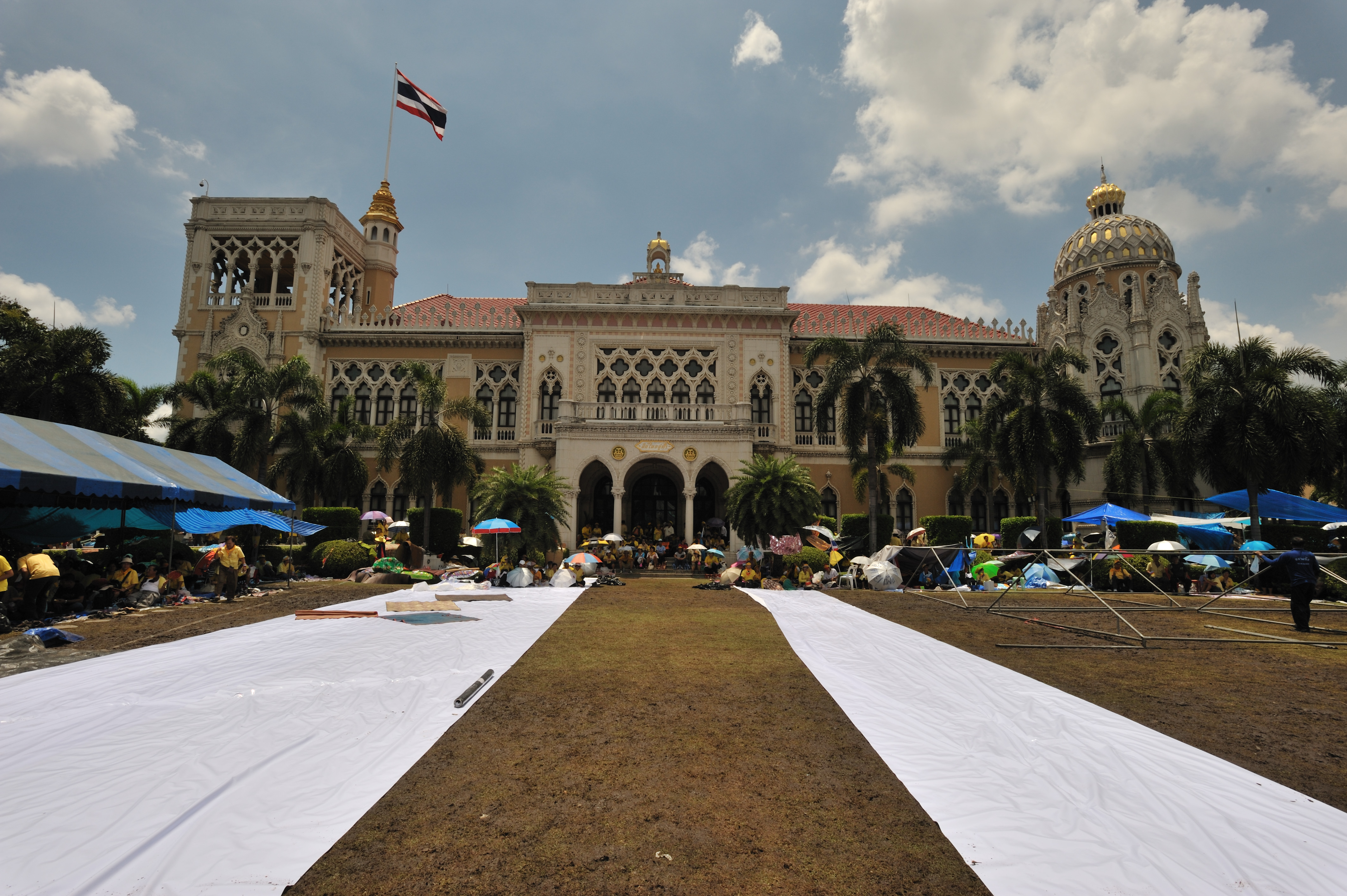
The People's Alliance for Democracy laid siege to and has occupied the Government House since 26 August 2008.

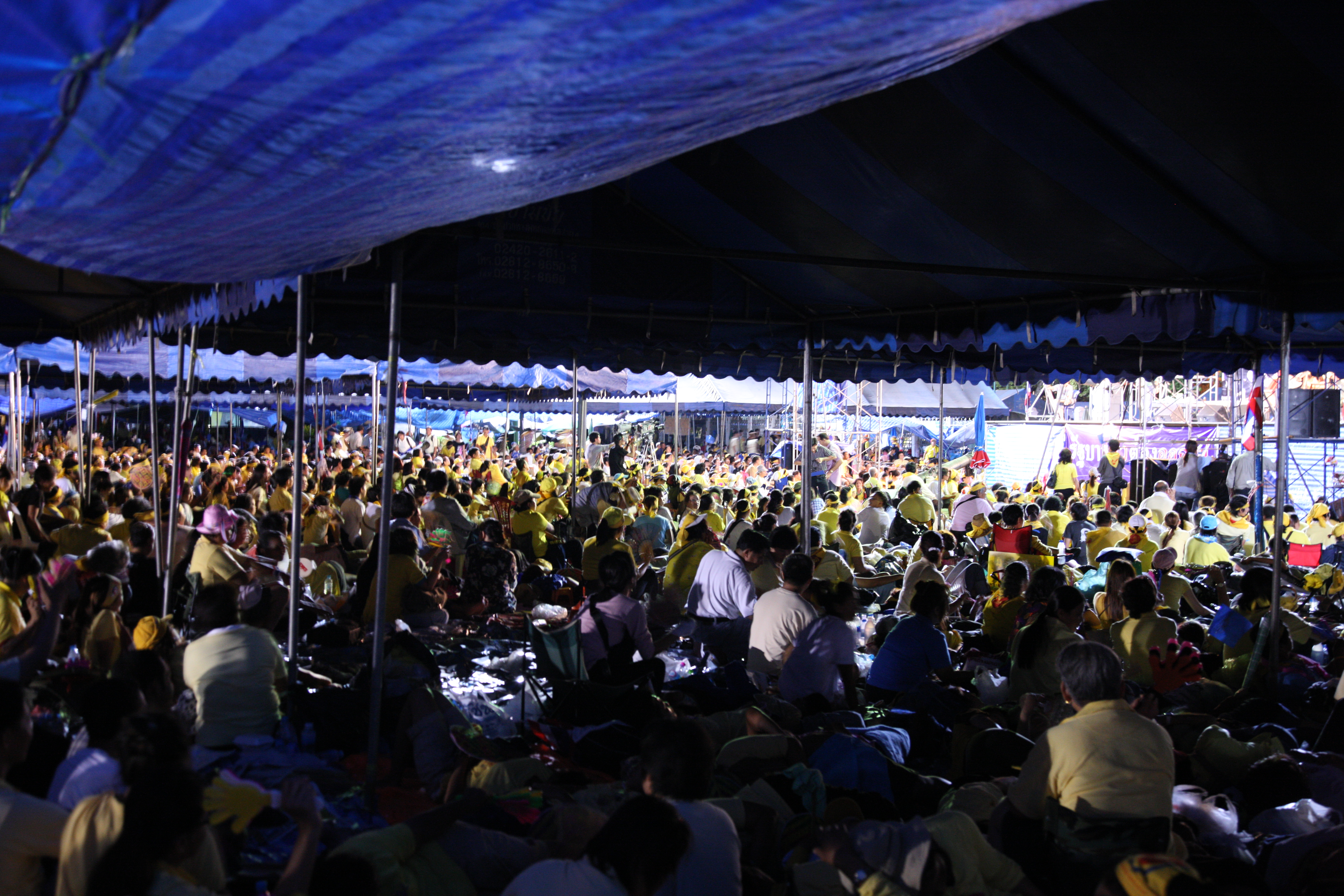
Protesters under a tent at the Government House

Samak Sundaravej's government was in difficulty on 10 July 2008, after Pattama, the third top official in the ruling People Power Party (PPP), resigned from his post. The deputy leader of the party Yongyut Tiyapairat was also banned from politics for 5 years, and Chiya Sasomsub was removed for illegally concealing his wife's assets. The Constitutional Court had already ruled that the entire cabinet violated the charter, and the Opposition filed a petition to impeach Noppadon Pattama. Even though the demands for Samak resignation were abundant, he remarked, "I will never resign in response to these threats. I will not dissolve the House. I will meet the king today to report what's going on." Later Samak met with King Bhumibol Adulyadej at Hua Hin palace.

A few days after, 30,000 protesters led by the People's Alliance for Democracy occupied Samak's Government House compound in central Bangkok so as to force him and his advisers to work out of a military command post. Thai riot police entered the occupied compound and delivered a court order for the eviction of protesters, but was instead abused. Chamlong Srimuang ordered 45 PAD guards to break into the main government building on Saturday. 3 regional airports remain closed and 35 trains between Bangkok and the provinces were canceled. Protesters raided the Phuket International Airport tarmac on the resort island of Phuket Province resulting to 118 flights canceled or diverted, affecting 15,000 passengers.

=== Widespread protests ===
Protesters also blocked the entrance of the airports in Krabi and Hat Yai. Police issued arrest warrants for Sondhi Limthongkul and 8 other protest leaders on charges of insurrection, conspiracy, unlawful assembly and refusing orders to disperse. Meanwhile, Gen. Anupong Paochinda stated: "The army will not stage a coup. The political crisis should be resolved by political means." Samak and the Thai Party ruling coalition called urgent parliamentary debate and session for August 31.

=== Clash between PAD and Anti-PAD ===
On 31 August, Metropolitan Police chief Pol Lt Gen Asawin Kwanmuang was transferred to an inactive position. He had been in charge of handling the PAD and favored a soft approach to avoid bloodshed. The protests were then assigned to deputy police chief Pol Gen Jongrak Juthanont. PAD spokesmen expressed fear that this would lead to violence by the police against PAD.

=== Government House as a protest site ===
Government House and the area around it became an open-air market during the months-long protest and seizure. The PAD put up posters with photos of a woman their security forces claimed was a prostitute because they found condoms in her purse. Mounds of garbage piled up in Government House, clothes were left to dry on the lawn, and the lack of sanitary facilities caused a stench to envelop the compound. A Khao Sod journalist claimed glass pipes that can be used for smoking methamphetamine (commonly known as "ICE") being sold near the protest site. The journalist noted that the stalls selling the pipes were attracting many potential buyers and that several people tried them out before making their purchase.

==== Arrest ====
On October 5 and 4, 2008, Chamlong Srimuang and rally organiser, Chaiwat Sinsuwongse were detained by the Thai police led by Col. Sarathon Pradit, by virtue of August 27 arrest warrant for insurrection, conspiracy, illegal assembly and refusing orders to disperse (treason) against him and 8 other protest leaders. At the Government House, Sondhi Limthongkul, however, stated demonstrations would continue: "I am warning you, the government and police, that you are putting fuel on the fire. Once you arrest me, thousands of people will tear you apart." Srimuang's wife, Ying Siriluck, visited him at the Border Patrol Police Region 1, Pathum Thani. Other PAD members still wanted by police include Sondhi, activist MP Somkiat Pongpaibul and PAD leaders Somsak Kosaisuk and Pibhop Dhongchai.

=== Closing off Parliament ===
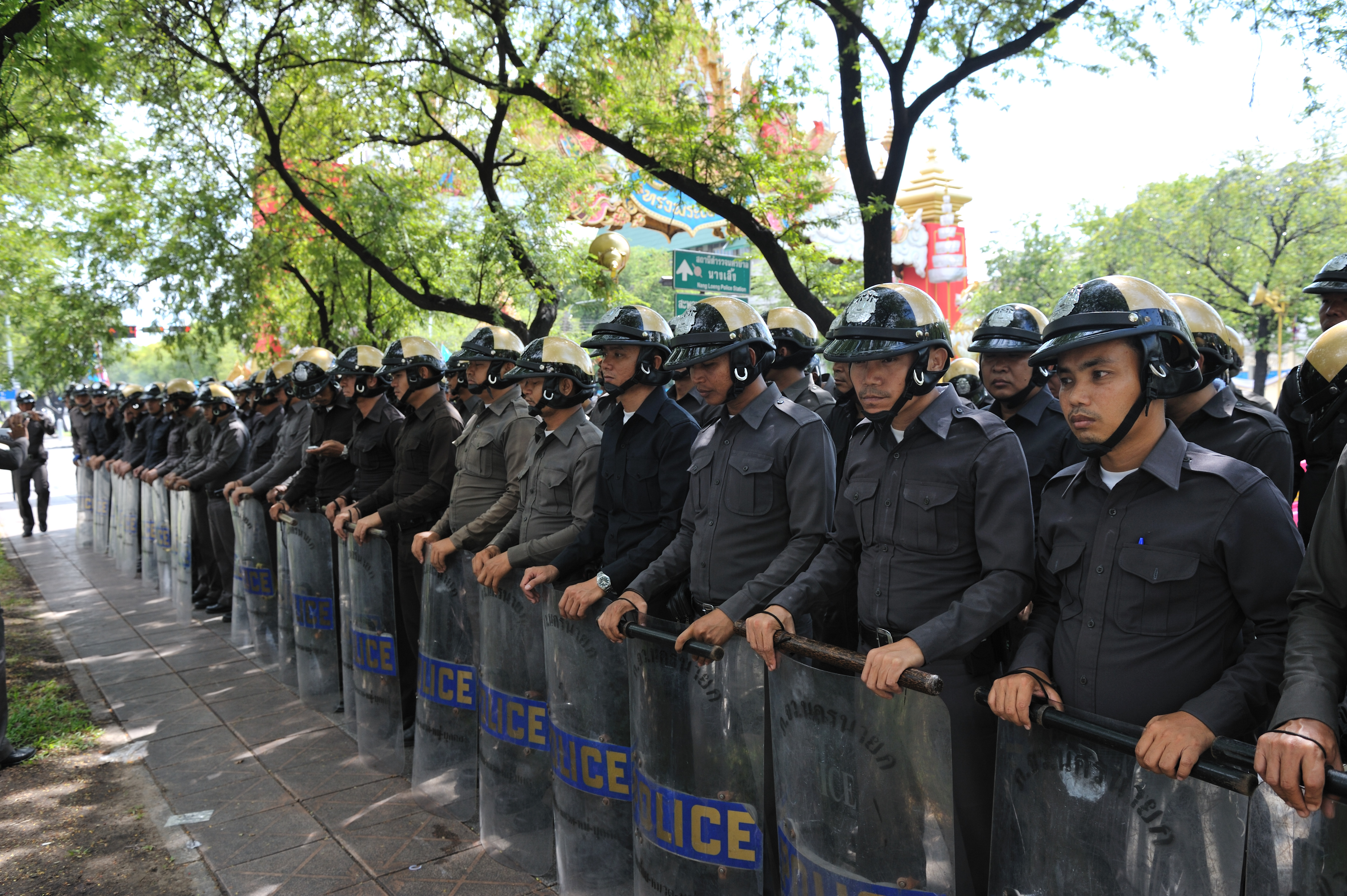
Police waiting near the protest zone

In early October, PAD leader Chamlong Srimuang left the protest site to vote in the Bangkok governor elections. He was arrested by police after he left the voting booth and did not request bail. Fellow PAD leader Pallop Pinmanee noted that Chamlong intended to be arrested in order to increase attendance at the PAD's protests.

Thousands of PAD forces soon surrounded Parliament to prevent the Somchai government from announcing its policies to the legislature within 15 days of swearing in, as mandated by the Constitution. A police loudspeaker lorry ordered protesters to disperse and warned that teargas would be fired. At 6.00 am, 7 October 2008, police at Ratchawithi Road and Pichai Road shot a barrage of teargas grenades. Police clashed with protesters. Many were injured on both sides. Police made no effort to negotiate with the anti-government protesters. Eventually the doors to Parliament could be opened for the attending legislators. PAD forces later regrouped around Parliament and again blocked the gates. After the government had made its policy statement to the legislature, police again clashed with PAD forces so that the legislators could leave the building. Clashes continued into the night.

Several protesters lost hands and legs, although at first it was not clear if these injuries were caused by tear gas canisters or the 'ping-pong' bombs which are explosives housed in ping-pong sized plastic balls. Director of the Central Institute of Forensic Science Pornthip Rojanasunand used the GT200 explosive detection device to try to identify explosive residue on the protesters; not finding any, she concluded that faulty Chinese-made tear gas grenades had caused the injuries. A PAD protester, Miss Angkhana Radappanyawut, was killed. Dr.Pornthip stated unequivocally that her death was caused by the explosion of a tear gas canister directly striking the victim's body. She also stated that there was no need to conduct further investigations into the death and injuries of protesters because it was clear they were caused by police weapons.

Afterwards, doctors from many major hospitals issued a statement, calling the counterattack by the Prime Minister and police unnecessary "brutality", and refusing to provide medical care to the police. The doctors claimed that many field rescue workers, including doctors and nurses, had also been attacked, and some were wounded. Doctor Suthep Kolcharnwit of the Chulalongkorn University Faculty of Medicine, with several doctors from Chulalongkorn Hospital, also refused to provide medical care to policemen injured in the clash, and urged doctors of other hospitals to boycott the police as well, though his actions were later disowned by the hospital and a case against him was filed with the Medical Council's ethics committee.

PAD vowed to file charges against the government and police.

On 8 October, Queen Sirikit attended the cremation of one of the young PAD woman who had been killed.

=== Seizure of Suvarnabhumi International Airport ===
==== Seizing the airport ====
On the evening of Tuesday 25 November 2008, the PAD executed what they called "Operation Hiroshima." A convoy of hundreds of PAD members dressed in yellow blocked the two ends of the road in front of the terminal building of Suvarnabhumi International Airport and blockaded the main road to the airport. The airport is Bangkok's main airport and an important regional hub. PAD forces quickly overpowered hundreds of policemen armed with riot gear. PAD leaders mounted a mobile stage and proceeded to criticize the government. All Suvarnabhumi flights were soon canceled, leaving thousands of travelers stranded in the airport.

The government called on the Royal Thai Army to restore order at the airport. The Army did not follow the orders. In a press conference on 26 November, Army Commander General Anupong Paochinda proposed that the PAD withdraw from the airport and that the government resign. He also proposed that if the PAD did not comply, that they be subject to "social sanctions", whereas if the government did not comply, that the bureaucracy stop implementing government orders. A written copy of the proposal was sent to the government. Neither the PAD nor the government complied with the proposal.

At 4:30 AM on the morning of 26 November, three explosions were heard on the fourth floor of Suvarnbumi on the outside of the passenger terminal. Another explosion was reported at 6 AM. Several people were injured. It was not clear who set off the explosions. The PAD did not allow the police or forensics experts to investigate the explosions.

The PAD became the de facto authority over the airport and the airplanes within it. Airports of Thailand, which planned to use U-Tapao military airbase outside of Bangkok as a replacement for Suvarnabhumi, pleaded with PAD leadership to release nearly a hundred empty aircraft from Suvarnabhumi.

==== Attempts to evict the PAD ====
Also on 26 November, the Civil Court issued an injunction ordering the PAD to leave the Suvarnabhumi International Airport immediately. Notices of the injunction were placed on the front doors of the houses of the 13 PAD leaders. The PAD did not comply with the injunction.

On the evening of 27 November, the government declared a state of emergency around the two occupied airports and ordered police to clear out PAD forces. The state of emergency allowed the military to ban public gatherings of more than five people. The Navy was assigned to aid police at Suvarnabhumi, while the Air Force was assigned to aid police at Don Muang. The Army's spokesman noted, "The army disagrees with using troops to resolve the problem. The army does not want to do that, and it is not appropriate to do that."

The PAD was defiant. PAD leader Suriyasai Katasila announced that the PAD would fight off police. "If the government wants to clear the protesters, let it try. The PAD will protect all locations because we are using our rights to demonstrate peacefully without causing damages to state properties or rioting," Suriyasai said. Suriyasai also threatened to use human shields if police attempted to disperse the PAD. Human shields of 300-400 women were assigned to physically surround each PAD leader. Foreign journalists reported that the PAD was paying people to join them at the airport, with extra payment being given to parents bringing babies and children.

On the morning of 28 November, PAD leader Chamlong Srimuang announced to PAD forces that he had received a call from an unspecified "senior person" (ผู้ใหญ่ท่านหนึ่ง) telling him to end the rallies. But he refused to do what the senior person told him. "For the past 108 days, the Alliance has protested together under hardship, while another group of people has remained in comfort. They can't just suddenly ask us to stop protesting," he told the assembled forces. Addressing supporters on ASTV, Sondhi said, "If we have to die today, I am willing to die. This is a fight for dignity."

Police guarded checkpoints on roads leading to the airport. At one checkpoint, police found 15 home-made guns, an axe and other weapons in a Dharma Army six-wheel truck taking 20 protesters to Suvarnabhumi airport. Another checkpoint found an Uzi submachine gun, homemade guns, ammunition, sling shots, bullet-proof vests and metal rods. The vehicle had the universally recognised Red Cross signs on its exterior to give the impression it was being used for medical emergencies. At another checkpoint, about 2 kilometers from the airport, was attacked by armed PAD forces in vehicles, causing the police to withdraw. Police Senior Sgt Maj Sompop Nathee, an officer from the Border Patrol Police Region 1, later returned to the scene of the clash and was detained by PAD forces. He was interrogated by Samran Rodphet, a PAD leader, and then detained inside the airport. Reporters and photographers tried to follow Sompop to his interrogation, but PAD forces did not allow them. PAD supporters were moved from Government House to the airport.

The airport remained closed due to the PAD seizure as of 2 December. With the exception of one airplane leaving for the Hajj, no flights were allowed. The PAD has been apologetic to inconvenienced foreigners in the airports and offered them food.

==== End of the siege ====
Shortly after the Constitutional Court dissolved the three parties of the government coalition on 2 December 2008, the PAD held a press conference where they announced that they were ending all of their protests as of 10 AM on 3 December 2008. "We have won a victory and achieved our aims," said Sondhi Limthongkul.

==== Views on the siege ====
Democrat Party MP for Sukhothai, Samphan Benchaphon, said of the airport seizure that the PAD "have the right to do it." Democrat Party MP for Bangkok, Thawil Praison, said that the PAD "could seize the airport and doing so is not excessive. The entire world understands that this is a normal matter in the struggle of democratic countries."

The governments of China, France, Italy, Germany, New Zealand, Singapore, Britain, the United States, Australia and Japan warned their citizens to avoid Thailand and steer clear of protesters at the airport.

The European Union urged the protesters to peacefully leave the airports. EU ambassadors to Thailand write in a joint statement that the demonstrators are hurting Thailand's image and economy, continuing "While respecting the right of protesting and without interfering in any way with the internal political debate in Thailand, the EU considers that these actions are totally inappropriate".

US State Department spokesman Gordon Duguid said that occupying the airports was "not an appropriate means of protest" and that the PAD should "walk away from the airports peacefully."

=== Closure of Bangkok Don Muang Airport ===
On the night of 26 November 2008, the services at the Don Mueang Airport were stopped after the People's Alliance for Democracy seized control of the domestic passenger terminal.

A bomb exploded near a bunker made of tyres near the main entrance to the passenger terminal at Don Muang Airport at 3:55 AM on 30 November. Before the explosion occurred, about 7 gunshots were heard from the direction of a warehouse deeper inside the airport compound. No one was injured in the explosion. It was not clear who or what set the bomb off.

A plainclothes policewoman at the airport was identified and captured by PAD security forces and forced onto the main PAD stage inside the airport. Angry PAD protesters threw water at her and many tried to hit her. She was eventually allowed to leave the airport.

Flights from Don Mueang Airport began again on 5 December.

== 2009 unrest ==
=== Pattaya ===
In March 2009, Thaksin Shinawatra claimed via video broadcast that Privy Council President Prem Tinsulanonda masterminded the 2006 military coup, and that Prem and fellow Privy Councilor members Surayud Chulanont and Chanchai Likhitjittha conspired with the military and PAD to ensure that Abhisit became Premier. Although Abhisit denied the accusations, thousands protested in Bangkok early April demanding that Abhisit resign from the Premiership and that Prem, Surayud, and Chanchai resign from the Privy Council.

The protests, led by the red-shirted National United Front of Democracy Against Dictatorship (UDD) expanded to Pattaya, causing the Fourth East Asia Summit to be canceled and a state of emergency to be declared in the region. The PAD issued a statement demanding that Abhisit dismiss Deputy Prime Minister in charge of security Suthep Thaugsuban, Defence Minister Gen. Prawit Wongsuwan, and Thailand's army, navy and police chiefs immediately for failed to contain the UDD protesters. PAD leader Chamlong Srimuang told a press conference that if the government could not help the country, the PAD would "come out."

=== Bangkok ===
As the week-long Songkran (Thai New Year) holiday began, protests escalated in Bangkok. Fighting erupted between anti-government protesters, PAD members, and the general population. At a demonstration in front of Prem's residence, a PAD supporter plunged her car into a crowd of UDD protesters before driving away. Abhisit declared a state of emergency for Bangkok and surrounding areas and denounced the anti-government protesters as "national enemies".

In a pre-dawn raid on Monday April 13, Thai soldiers in full combat kit fired live rounds and training rounds from automatic weapons to clear protesters from the Din Daeng intersection near the Victory Monument in central Bangkok, injuring at least 70 people. Violent clashes at numerous locations in Bangkok continued while arrest warrants were issued for Thaksin and 13 protest leaders. Surrounded by the military, many protest leaders eventually gave in to police on 14 April 2009, ending the violence.

=== Shooting of Sondhi Limthongkul ===
Days after the Bangkok unrest was quelled by military forces, gunmen ambushed Sondhi's car at a petrol station, shot out the tires, and fired over 100 M-16 and AK-47 assault rifle rounds at the car. Sondhi suffered one wound to the head and was conscious, standing, and lucid before being sent to the hospital for surgery. Sondhi survived the surgery and was visited by relatives afterwards. It was not clear who ordered the shooting, although the PAD's spokesman speculated that a faction of the military or police could have been behind it.

== 2005–2009 media ==
=== 2005–2006 ===
The PAD is supported by the Sondhi Limthongkul-owned Manager Media Group, including Manager Daily newspaper and the ASTV satellite television channel. Sondhi had originally co-hosted a political talk show called Muangthai Raisabdah on MCOT's Channel 9. Sondhi's pro-Thaksin views (in a 23 September 2003 broadcast, he noted that Thaksin was "the best prime minister our country has ever had.") started changing in 2004 after the government fired Sondhi's banker, Viroj Nualkhair, from Krung Thai Bank for incurring too many bad debts. In September 2005, Sondhi allegedly made repeated disrespectful on-air references to King Bhumibol Adulyadej. Among these references was a claim that the government's 2004 appointment of Somdet Phra Buddhacharya as acting Supreme Patriarch of Thailand in place of the critically ill Somdet Phra Yanasangworn contravened the prerogative of the King. After discussions with King's principal private secretary, Arsa Sarasin, MCOT executives cancelled the program. Sondhi took his increasingly anti-Thaksin talkshow on the road, broadcasting via satellite (through his NEWS1 ASTV channel based out of Hong Kong) and webcasting via the website of his Manager Daily newspaper. Talkshow sites, including Sanam Luang and the King Rama V equestrian statue, became magnets for the PAD crowds.

After the 2006 military coup, the military junta ordered broadcaster MCOT to cover weekly tapings of Muangthai Raisabdah. Sondhi was also given a slot on the junta-run National Broadcasting Service of Thailand's Channel 11 where he hosted Yam Fao Paendin, a pro-junta, anti-Thaksin talkshow which made accusations of excessive government spending at Suvarnabhumi Airport.

=== 2008 ===
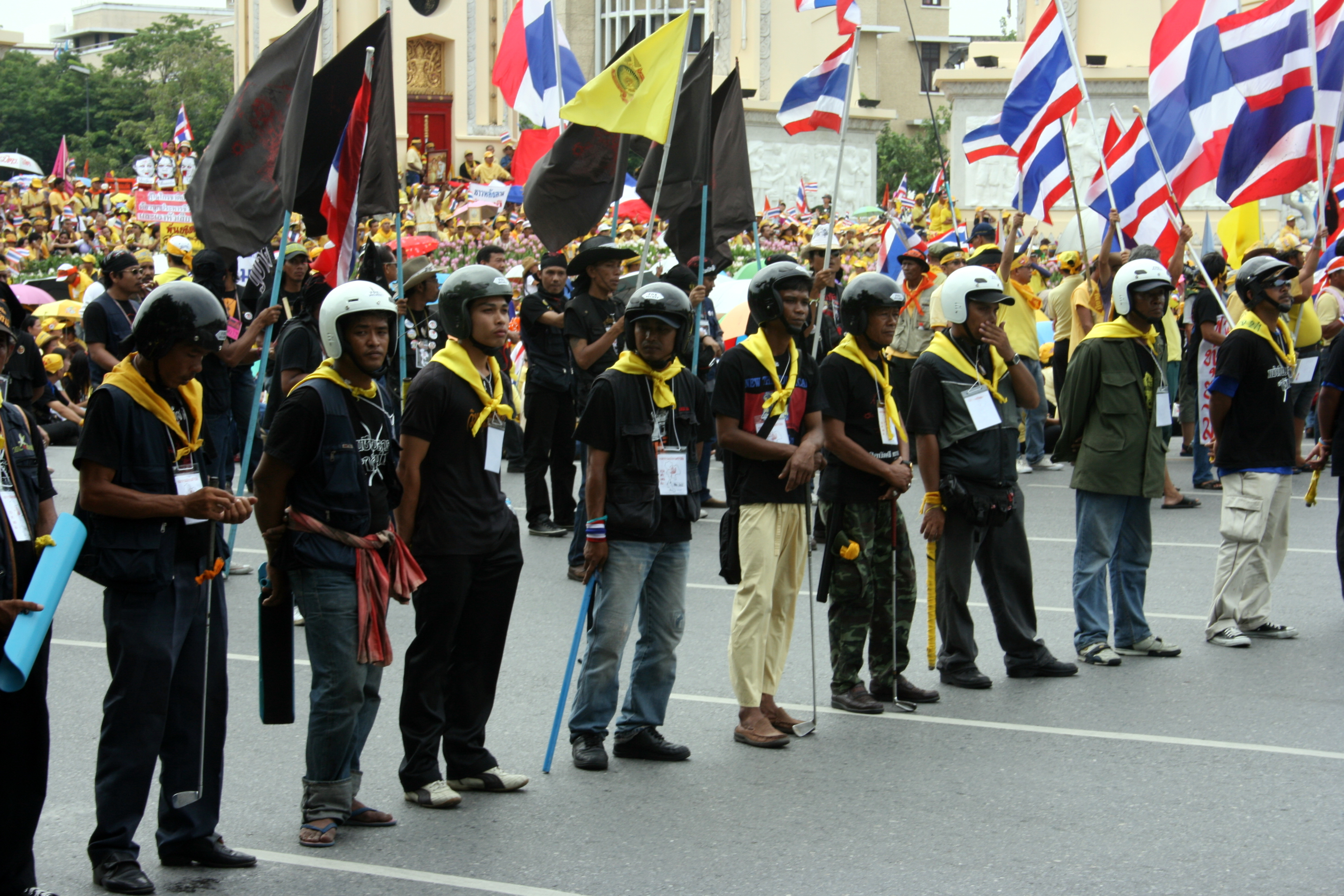
PAD protesters armed with improvised batons and golf clubs

During the 2008 political crisis, armed masked PAD forces broke into the government-owned National Broadcasting Service of Thailand and seized control of the television station. The television broadcast of the morning news program briefly showed pictures of PAD forces breaking into the gates of the station before blacking out for several hours. NBT employees were threatened with violence and forced out of the station. Police eventually regained control of the building and arrested 80 of the raiders, seizing guns, knives, golf clubs, and drugs. The raiders were charged with causing damage to public property and illegal possession of weapons and drugs. Later in the same day, hundreds of hundreds of PAD members, led by Amorn Amornrattananon, again seized the NBST station. Police eventually regained control of the station. The Southeast Asian Press Alliance and the Thai Journalists Association condemned what it called the "mob attack" on the station, and noted that the unjustifiable and went against the principles of democracy, free flow of information, and fair play that the PAD themselves have claimed to justify their illegal act.

Journalists at PAD-controlled Government House reported that they were intimidated, pelted with water bottles, and attacked with a metal pipe. The Nation a journalist reported that PAD leaders incited hostility towards outsiders, particularly journalists. Channel 9 news crew were attacked after the PAD claimed their news reporting was biased toward government. The PAD limited media access to Government House claiming that the media might be undercover policemen or anti-PAD groups in disguise.

A photographer from the Thai-language newspaper Thai Rath was attacked by PAD security forces after he took photos of them beating a man at Don Muang airport. PAD security forces also stopped reporters and photographers from covering the detention capture of Sompop Nathee, a captured policeman, at Suvarnabhumi airport.

A TNN television truck was repeatedly shot at by PAD security forces while lost in PAD-controlled Don Muang airport. Phanumart Jaihork, a TNN relay controller, said his truck came under heavy gunfire even though it carried the logos of the company and TV station on its sides and a microwave transmitter in its bed.

== After the 2009 protests ==
On 2 June 2009, the PAD formed a political party called the New Politics Party or NPP. This party split into two factions in 2011. It holds no seats in Parliament.

Many important PAD leaders have been involved in the 2013–2014 protests against the government of Thaksin's sister, Yingluck Shinawatra. The group renamed itself the "People's Movement to Overthrow the Thaksin Regime" (Thai: กองทัพประชาชนโค่นระบอบทักษิณ) and is a key member of the People's Democratic Reform Committee (PDRC). Leaders Sondhi Limthongkul, Chamlong Srimuang and others were indicted on 27 December 2012 for storming the prime minister's office compound and sealing off Parliament during the massive anti-government rallies in 2008.

== See also ==
- 2010 Thai political protests
- Politics of Thailand
- Sale of Shin Corporation to Temasek Holdings
- April 2006 Thai general election
- October 2006 Thai general election

== Literature ==
- Michael K. Connors (February 2008), "Article of Faith: The Failure of Royal Liberalism in Thailand" (PDF), Journal of Contemporary Asia, 38 (1): 143–165, doi:10.1080/00472330701652000, S2CID 144223931, archived from the original on 2008-07-23
- Michael H. Nelson (2010), "People's Alliance for Democracy. From 'New Politics' to a 'Real' Political Party?", Legitimacy Crisis and Political Conflict in Thailand, Silkworm Books, pp. 119–159
- Oliver Pye; Wolfram Schaffar (2008), "The 2006 anti-Thaksin movement in Thailand: An analysis", Journal of Contemporary Asia, 38 (1): 38–61, doi:10.1080/00472330701651945, S2CID 154901086
