= Somsak Kosaisuuk =

Thai union official and politician

- สมศักดิ์ โกศัยสุข
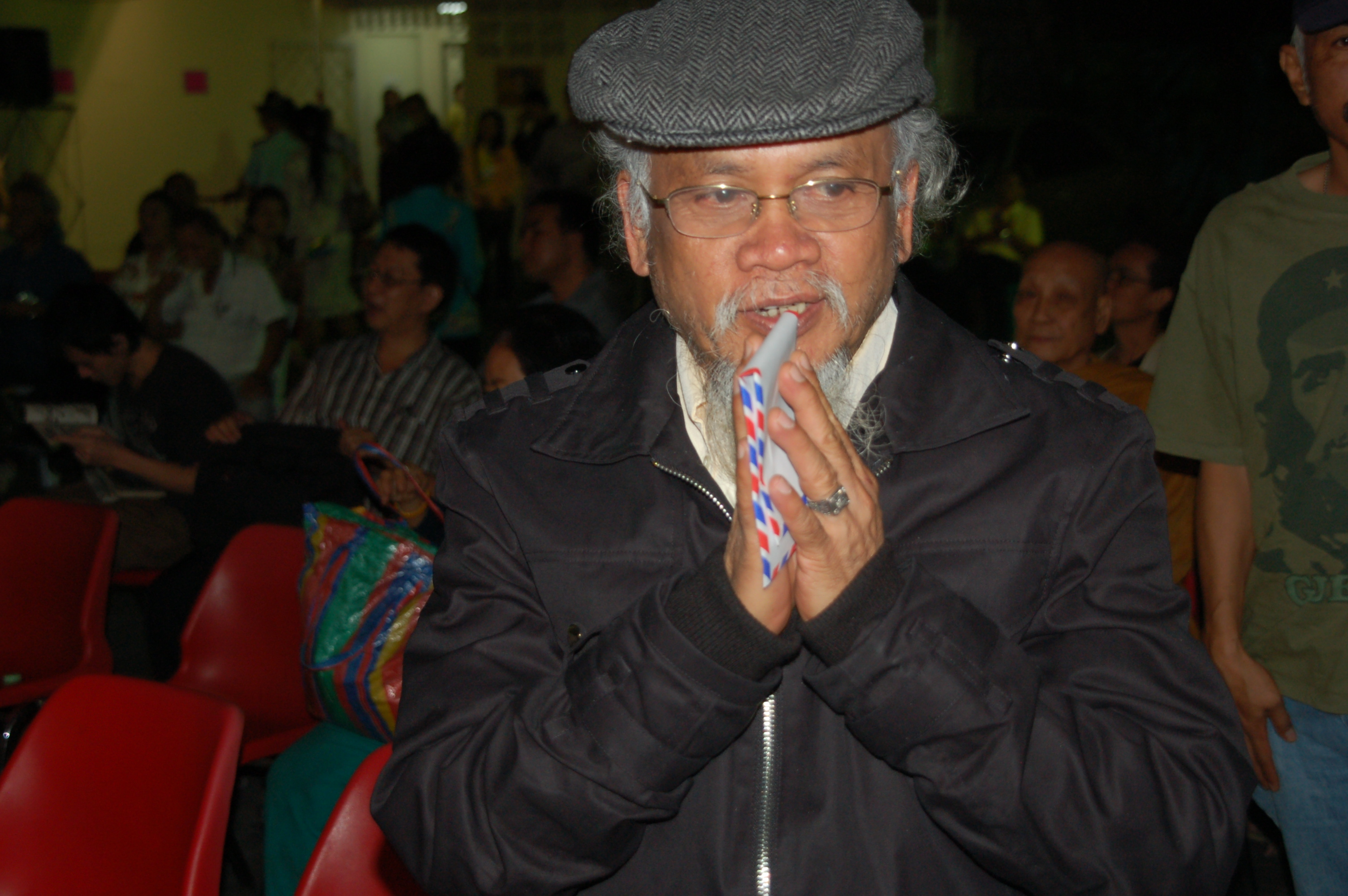
- Somsak Kosaisuuk in 2009
- Born: 2 March 1945 (age 81); Khuan Koei, Ron Phibun, Nakhon Si Thammarat, Thailand
- Occupations: Politician; activist
- Years active: 1992–2017

Somsak Kosaisuuk (Thai script: สมศักดิ์ โกศัยสุข; born 2 March 1945) is a Thai union official and politician.

He was the Secretary-General of the State Enterprise Labour Relations Confederation (SELRC), a union of government owned enterprises' employees, and in this position very active in organizing a campaign against the privatization of the Electricity Generating Authority of Thailand. Currently, he is an adviser to the union.

Kosaisuuk was one of the five leaders of the People's Alliance for Democracy (PAD). When the PAD registered a political party, the New Politics Party (NPP), Somsak became its chairman. In late April 2011, he resigned from the PAD leadership in a split that separated the PAD from the NPP.

According to a poll conducted by Angus Reid Public Opinion during September 2010, Kosaisuuk was named the least liked politician in Thailand.

In protests against the Yingluck Shinawatra government in 2013–14, his cousin Suthin Taratin, one of the People's Democratic Reform Committee (PDRC) allies, was shot dead in front of Sri Iam Temple, Bangkok's Bang Na area.
