= Pipob Thongchai =

Thai politician (born 1945)

- พิภพ ธงไชย
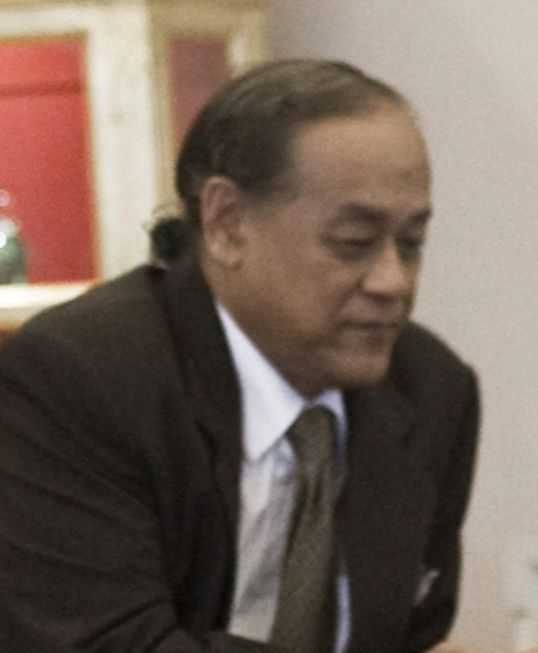
- Phiphob Thongchai in 2009
- Born: 10 July 1945 (age 80); Ang Thong, Thailand
- Occupation: Non-governmental organization leader
- Years active: 1992–2015

Pipob Thongchai (Thai: พิภพ ธงไชย) is a non-governmental organization leader who advocates a wide range of issues. He has been active since he was a college student, when he was secretary of the University Student Federation of Thailand. He is also a former member of the Council of Socio-economic Consultants of Thailand, the Committee for Democratic Advocacy of Thailand, and the Children's Foundation of Thailand.

Thongchai was an early supporter of Thaksin Shinawatra and called for general support from the civil society in 2001.

In February 2006, he was selected as one of the five leaders of the People's Alliance for Democracy (PAD), the group that launched a major campaign demanding Prime Minister Thaksin Shinawatra resign. The PAD supported a coup d'état by the royally-supported military on 19 September 2006.

In September 2008, Thongchai advocated a state-sponsored scheme of early childhood character education and development, which would serve to indoctrinate children younger than three years in the morals and ethics of "Thainess".

As of 7 October 2009, he serves as an advisor to the New Politics Party.
