= New Politics Party =

New Politics Party พรรคการเมืองใหม่
- Abbreviation: NPP
- Leader: Sonthi Limthongkul (2009–2010); Somsak Kosaisuuk (2010–2013)
- Secretary-General: Sukom Srinuan
- Spokesperson: Chalong Raksasri
- Founded: 2 June 2009
- Dissolved: 7 July 2013
- Headquarters: Bangkok

The New Politics Party (abbreviated NPP; Thai: พรรคการเมืองใหม่ RTGS: Phak Kan Mueang Mai, ก.ม.ม.), was a political party in Thailand founded on 2 June 2009. The NPP was the political party of the People's Alliance for Democracy (PAD; "Yellow Shirts"), with which it shared the same principles and ideas. Ahead of the 2011 general election, the party broke with the PAD movement, and renamed to Thai Social Democratic Party (TSDP; Thai: พรรคสังคมประชาธิปไตยไทย) two years later.

== History ==
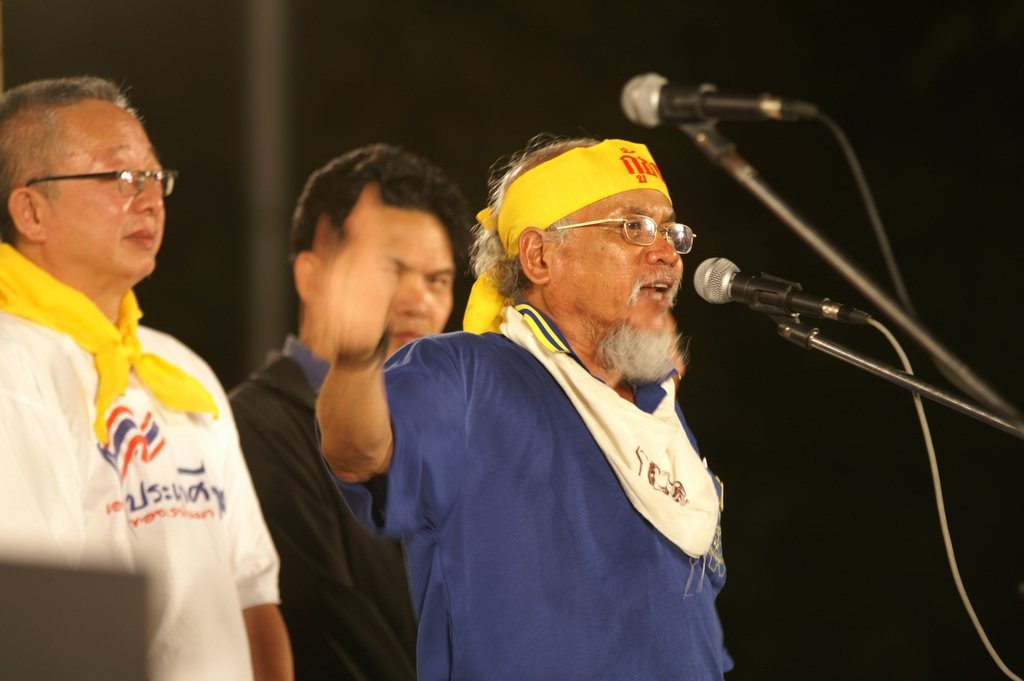
Party leaders Sondhi Limthongkul (left) and Somsak Kosaisuuk (right)

In May 2009, The People's Alliance for Democracy, better known as the "Yellow Shirts" movement, announced to create a political party. It claimed that other political parties in Thailand protected only their own vested interests, such as the bureaucrats and elites, and were unable to tackle the country's problems. The party aspired to solicit more than 5,000 members and set up branches in all regions of Thailand, within the one-year deadline. It also planned to an early completion of the registration process in order to contest the next general election. The interim leader of the party was Somsak Kosaisuuk. On 7 October 2009, Sondhi Limthongkul was elected as the leader of the party.

The party's colors were yellow and green. Yellow referred to the constitutional monarchy of Thailand, and green represented "clean politics", in which corruption is repelled by an independent judiciary. The party's logo showed four yellow hands intertwined in a swastika-like arrangement, against a green background, topped by a rainbow in Thailand's national colours. It was said to symbolise that "the people are at the centre of new politics", referring to the four main regions of Thailand and four occupational groups.

== Aims for political reform ==
PAD and NPP wanted to replace the National Assembly of Thailand with a body with only 30 percent directly elected members of parliament, the rest installed by employers and labour unions or similar interest groups, in order to achieve their ideal of "clean politics". Their adherents typically distrusted established politicians and representatives and wanted to replace them. The party claimed to defend the supposedly endangered monarchy.

== 2011 split ==
In 2011 a split occurred between Sondhi and the majority of PAD on one side and the NPP leadership around Somsak on the other. In late-March Sondhi demanded the party boycott the upcoming parliamentary elections according to PAD's extra-parliamentary opposition strategy and its abstention campaign ("Vote No"). This was rejected by Somsak and NPP functionaries who were keen to field candidates and seek parliamentary representation. The hardline PAD position, however, was that all party politicians—including NPP members—should retreat for a certain period while the king would appoint a non-partisan, expert government. This idea was rejected by Somsak and his public servants union, SELRC, as undemocratic and "close to a coup d'etat". This led consequently to the retirement of Somsak from the PAD leadership in late-April and Sondhi's departure from the NPP in return. Eventually, the party received 0.1% of votes in the July 2011 election.

In 2013 Somsak Kosaisuuk changed the name of the party to Thai Social Democratic Party. The Thai Social Democratic Party was subsequently dissolved by the Constitutional Court of Thailand in 2019 as part of broader legal proceedings against political parties that failed to meet membership requirements under Thai electoral law.

== Leader ==
No.	Name	From	To
1	Somsak Kosaisuk	2 June 2009	5 October 2009
2	Sonthi Limthongkul	5 October 2009	14 May 2010
3	Somsak Kosaisuk	3 July 2010	7 July 2013
