= Television Pool Association (Thailand) =

Broadcast organization of Thailand

- Country: Thailand
- Founded: 20 December 1968; 57 years ago
- Broadcast area: Thailand
- Nation: Thailand
- Picture format: 1080i (HDTV) (on HD channels); 576i (SDTV) (on SD channels)
- Affiliations: Channel 7 HD; RTATV 5 HD; Channel 3 HD; 9MCOT HD; NBT; NBT World; NBT Regional; Thai PBS; T Sports 7; TPTV; TNN16; Nation TV; Workpoint TV; True4U; GMM25; Channel 8; Monomax Sports TV; ONE31; Thairath TV; Amarin TV; PPTV HD 36; TOP NEWS; NEWS1; DLTV 1-15; Police TV; ETV; People TV; MVTV

TPT Logo, with abbreviation in Thai language

Television Pool Association (Thailand) (Thai: สมาคมโทรทัศน์รวมการเฉพาะกิจ (ประเทศไทย); RTGS: Samakhom Thorathat Ruam Kan Chaphokit (Prathet Thai)), formerly known as Television Pool of Thailand (Thai: โทรทัศน์รวมการเฉพาะกิจแห่งประเทศไทย; RTGS: Thorathat Ruam Kan Chaphokit Haeng Prathet Thai) is an organization established by Channel 7 HD, RTA 5, Channel 3 HD and 9MCOT HD on 20 December 1968 to collaborate on live coverage of special events such as royal events, governmental events and addresses and sport games such as Olympic Games, Asian Games, SEA Games, and FIFA World Cup.

== History ==
=== Television Pool Association (Thailand) ===
On February 21, 2025, the Board of Directors of the Television Pool of Thailand decided to change its legal status from a group of individuals to a registered association. The association is now officially named the Television Pool Association (Thailand) (English: สมาคมโทรทัศน์รวมการเฉพาะกิจ (ประเทศไทย)). The association's committee is mainly composed of executives and representatives from all 4 television stations: the CEO of RTA 5 HD as the president of the association, executives of Channel 7HD, executives of Channel 3 HD, and executives of 9MCOT HD as the 1st, 2nd, and 3rd vice presidents respectively, a representative of RTA 5 HD as the registrar and legal department, a representative of Channel 3 HD as the hostess, a representative of Channel 7HD as the public relations, a representative of 9MCOT HD as the treasurer, and another representative of RTA 5 HD as the secretary.

On December 16 of the same year, the Royal Gazette website published the announcement from the Registrar of Associations for Bangkok regarding the official registration of the association. The Registrar officially approved the association’s establishment, effective October 29, 2025.

== Channels broadcasting under the TPT brand ==
- Channel 7 HD
- RTA 5 HD
- Channel 3 HD
- 9MCOT HD
- NBT (NBT World and NBT Regional)
- Thai PBS
- T Sports 7
- TPTV
- TNN16
- Nation TV
- Workpoint TV
- True4U
- GMM25
- Channel 8
- Monomax Sports TV
- ONE31
- Thairath TV
- Amarin TV
- PPTV HD
- TOP NEWS
- NEWS1
- Police TV
- ETV
- DLTV 1-15
- Suwannabhumi Channel
- People TV
