= Digital terrestrial television in Thailand =

The digital terrestrial television system was launched in Thailand in 2014. it employs DVB-T2 as its digital encoding standard.

The Broadcast Commission (BC) under the National Broadcasting and Telecommunications Commission (NBTC) announced in the last quarter of 2013 that it plans to give DTTV license through open auction within December 2013. The prospectus has been priced at 1 million baht and many of the incumbent content owners providers as well as studios bought the prospectus. If all goes well, the auction will result in 4 categories of licenses: High Definition TV, Standard Definition TV, Children TV and Digital News TV. The number of provider who will survive the auction is still unknown.

Prior to the auction announcement, BC quietly granted a bottleneck "network" license to existing government incumbent which means that all the new DTTV providers have to send DTTV signal to these governmental MUX providers at the price fixed by the providers themselves. In response to claim of uncertainty and in order to lessen financial risk to potential bidders might face after the granting of license, BC came out to state that it encouraged the "potential" bidders to "negotiate" MUX price/charge before going into the bidding room.

== List of channels on multiplexes ==
24 Commercial broadcasting
Owner	Variety HD	Variety SD	News	Sports
The One Enterprise (Note: subsidiaries of GMM Grammy)	ONE31	GMM25	No	No
Bangkok Media	PPTV	No	No	No
BBTV	Channel 7	No	No	No
Triple V (Note: Subsidiary of Thairath)	Thairath TV	No	No	No
Amarin	Amarin TV	No	No	No
RS Vision	No	Channel 8	No	No
Workpoint	No	Workpoint TV	No	No
Nation	No	No	Nation TV	No
TrueVisions (Note: Through subsidiaries Thai News Network and True4U Station)	No	true4U	TNN16	No
Mono Next	No	No	No	MONOMAX Sports
BEC Multimedia	Channel 3	No	No	No
MCOT PLC	9MCOT	No	No	No

24 public broadcasting (Local 12 public broadcasting)
Name	Owner	Type	Channel Number
NBT	The Government Public Relations Department	Public TV HD	2
Thai PBS	Thai Public Broadcasting Service	Public TV HD	3
RTA5	Royal Thai Army	Public TV HD	5
T Sports	Ministry of Tourism and Sports	Sports channels SD	7
TPTV	The Secretariat of The House of Representatives	Parliament SD	10
NBT Regional TV	The Government Public Relations Department	Public and Regional TV HD	11

== Multiplexes (MUX) ==
Digital television network operators in Thailand consists of Royal Thai Army (2 Multiplexes), MCOT, The Government Public Relations Department (PRD) and Thai Public Broadcasting Service (ThaiPBS)

PRD	TV5 MUX2	MCOT	TPBS	TV5 MUX5

Public Television	NBT (2)	Thai PBS (3)	RTA5 (5)	T Sports (7)	TPTV (10)	NBT Regional (11)	
News	TNN (16)	Nation TV (22)					
SD	Workpoint TV(23)	True4U (24)	GMM25 (25)	Channel 8 (27)	MONOMAX Sports (29)		
HD	9MCOT (30)	ONE31 (31)	Thairath TV (32)	Channel 3 (33)	Amarin TV (34)	Channel 7 (35)	PPTV (36)

== See also ==
- Television in Thailand
- Digital television transition
