= Top News (Thailand) =

- Country: Thailand
- Broadcast area: Thailand
- Headquarters: 333 Moo 4, Thana City, Bang Chalong Subdistrict, Bang Phli District, Samut Prakan Province, Thailand

Programming
- Language: Thai
- Picture format: 576i SDTV; 1080i HDTV

Ownership
- Owner: Top News Digital Media Co., Ltd.

History
- Launched: 1 February 2021; 5 years ago (as cable and satellite channel) (via channel 77); 18 September 2023; 3 years ago (as cable, satellite and digital TV channel) (via channel 18)
- Replaced: TVD10 (via channel 77)
- Closed: 30 September 2023; 3 years ago (as cable and satellite channel) (via channel 77)
- Former names: Top TV (pre-launch)

Links
- Website: www.topnews.co.th

Availability

Terrestrial
- PSI (Thailand): Channel 77
- Canal+ (Myanmar): Channel 67

Streaming media
- TrueID: Watch live

Top News (Thai: ท็อปนิวส์) is a Thai broadcast television news channel owned by Top News Digital Media Co., Ltd., a company led by Sonthiyan Chuenruthainaitham.

The company was established in December 2020 by former staff and journalists of Nation TV, who had departed the network over objections to a change in management that planned to pivot the channel away from a far-right and pro-government positioning following criticism of its coverage of the 2020–21 Thai protests.

Top News was founded as Top TV in December 2020, then changed its current name in 2021. At the time, it negotiated with a number of digital terrestrial television channels but did not succeed. It was launched as a satellite television station in mid-January and began broadcasting for the first time on 1 February 2021 via a signal leased from TVD10 channel. On the PSI set-top box, it was available on channel 77 and a number of parallel streams on social media. Top News later moved its channel to channel 210. It started its digital terrestrial television broadcasts on 18 September 2023 on JKN18. The partnership between JKN Global Group and Top News was signed on 11 September of that year. The channel did a parallel broadcast alongside JKN18 from 18 to 30 September of the same year. It ceased its cable and satellite broadcasts on 30 September 2023 to transform Top News into a cable, satellite and digital terrestrial television channel which aired on JKN18 only.

== History ==
=== Development ===
In 2020, Nation Multimedia Group (NMG) was criticised for its coverage of the pro-democracy protests, including an incident where a Nation TV reporter had interviewed protestors without identifying themselves. NMG had pivoted its properties to a far-right, "ultra-nationalist" and pro-junta stance after its 2018 acquisition by Sonthiyan Chuenruthainaitham, while pro-democracy supporters urged advertisers to boycott its properties following the interview incident.

Sonthiyan had resigned in June 2020. In November 2020, in an effort to quell the advertiser boycotts, Nation Multimedia Group appointed Adisak Limparungpatanakij as the new director-general of Nation TV. Adisak discussed a desire for Nation TV to prioritize unbiased and fact-based journalism; these moves resulted in the resignation of a number of its journalists, such as Chatchai Phukokwai, Anchalee Paireerak and Kanok Ratwongsakul. The resignations led to rumours suggesting that they would be moving to another outlet, such as New 18 or MCOT HD.

On 4 December, a group led by Sonthiyan announced that they had acquired a terrestrial television channel; on 8 December, it was reported that the license had been sold by New 18's owners to the group, and had 800 million baht in advertising commitments from six to seven companies. On 16 December, Sonthiyan announced that the group would launch its new channel Top TV in January 2021, and the network launched its Facebook page. On 9 January, the channel changed its name to Top News, and began hiring for 74 job positions.

=== Launch ===
On 13 January, Sonthiyan announced that Top News would officially launch on 1 February across digital media, terrestrial, cable, and satellite television. He explained that its goal would be to "protect" the Thai institutions of nation, religion, and monarchy, implicating that it would hold a similarly far-right and pro-government stance to Nation TV under Sonthiyan. Top News officially launched on 1 February 2021 at 00:01, broadcasting on satellite and cable through the TVD10 space leased from ABPO Co., Ltd., and streaming on Facebook and YouTube.

On the opening day of the channel, the first program of Top News, broadcast exclusively live on all social media channels, totaled more than 10,000 people. Since the start of the station, it has been able to achieve ratings in 2nd place in the Non Must-Carry category of satellite television stations after Boomerang and is also #1 in the news and information category for some months as well.

For the name of the television station, from February 1 to March 10, 2021, the channel name is still used as "TVD10" along with the name "Top News" and two logos are displayed simultaneously. Next to the Top News logo on the left is the logo of TVD10 channel, starting from February 1 at 5:09 p.m. in the hot topic program TOP News has made a matter to the National Broadcasting and Telecommunications Commission (NBTC) to request permission to use the channel name as "Top News" only one name, which the NBTC approved at the 5/2021 meeting. On the same day, took the TVD10 logo off the screen on March 19 at 5:27 p.m. which the said moment is broadcasting on the Hot Issue Dissection (Live Program).

On May 18, 2021, the program "LINE Kanok Yok Siam" with Kanok as the main MC received a budget from Safe and Creative Media Development Fund to add 4.8 million baht to the program.

On September 30, 2021, The TV5 HD press conference to launch a new news program, by collaborating with Galaxy Multimedia Corporation Limited, which is a different entity from Top News in news production and hired a news anchor from Top News Channel to be a news anchor for 7 hours a day on TV5, including broadcasting 3 more programs on TV5 for 1 year, starting from January 3, 2022.

On the night of February 25, 2022, Top News moved its operating building from TV Direct's building in Watcharaphon to a new building on 5 Rai in Thana City Village, Thep Rattana Road Kilometer 14, Bang Chalong Subdistrict, Bang Phli District, Samut Prakan Province which has been changed by cutting the video signal from the TV Direct building to turn on the signal at Bang Phli Studio on the night of February 26 at 00:01 (such time is during the broadcast of the Chinese movie series The Legend of Xhu Zian, according to the normal program schedule of the station) with the first program that started using the new studio was the program "Top News at Noon Weekend".

On March 28, 2022, Galaxy Multimedia Corporation requested to terminate the contract from co-producing news for Channel 5 and return the news anchor back to the Top News program accordingly which will broadcast their program for the last day on March 31, 2022, which is expected to be caused by the chopping off of the signal of the Royal Thai Army Radio and Television Channel 5, while the news anchor presents the Russian invasion of Ukraine in the program "Channel 5 Noon News" But on March 31, 2022, the Royal Thai Army Radio and Television Channel 5 issued a statement apologizing to the program host and viewers for the discontinuation of the signal. And from the investigation of the Royal Thai Army Radio and Television Channel 5, it was found that this was caused by a technical and communication error of the team, Royal Thai Army Radio and Television Channel 5 had changed to sign a production contract with Top News directly, and all programs that Galaxy Multimedia Corporation produces for the Royal Thai Army Radio and Television Channel 5 continue to broadcast normally under the contract of Top News from April 1, 2022. However, the broadcast under the contract lasted only 1 month. Kanok then announced on his Facebook page that Top News had terminated his contract with Royal Thai Army Radio and Television Channel 5 since May 1, 2022, according to the agreement made with the Royal Thai Army Radio and Television Channel 5, Sontiyan clarified that the termination of the said contract came from the fact that Channel 5 was a government television station. which has many limitations, especially the news presentation Causing lately, the content presented by Top News on the Royal Thai Army Radio and Television Channel 5 has unusually weakened weight by TOP News hosted their live program on Channel 5 for the last day on April 29, 2022 and the last program of Top News broadcast in the Royal Thai Army Radio and Television Channel 5 was the program "Na Krub" on April 30, 2022.

On February 1, 2023, Prime Minister Prayut Chan-o-cha personally came to congratulate on the occasion of the 2nd anniversary of Top News. By the original schedule, he assigned Supattanapong Phanmeechaow Deputy Prime Minister and Minister of Energy went to congratulate on his behalf.

On September 9, 2023, there was news that Top News had negotiated with Jakkaphong Jakrajutatip, chief executive officer and president of JKN Global Group to acquire JKN18, which is the same television station that used to have a rumor that a group of TOP News personnel will move to work at the end of 2020 by acquiring the business for a value of approximately 500,000,000 baht, which if successful will be called TOP News 18 But Jakkaphong denied through a notification to the Stock Exchange of Thailand on September 11 that it was only an agreement to produce joint news programs between JKN18 and TOP News, in which that TOP News programs will be appeared on JKN18, replacing the main news programs that self-produced by the channel itself, starting on September 18 of that year. TOP News will also ceased broadcasting on cable and satellite on September 30, 2023, to pave way for the full transition of the channel into the digital TV era, which will be broadcast its news programs on JKN18 only.

After the process was completed, TOP News announced that it would end its satellite broadcasting and would move to broadcast on digital TV channel 18 under the new name JKN18 by TOP News from 18 September onwards and JKN18 has announced the dissolve of the former news staff including all JKN-CNBC news departments in order to clear the time slot for TOP News, while broadcasting via cable and satellite TV, which is TOP News' original channel, the broadcasting will continue as normal. But it will be a parallel broadcast from JKN18 only, and in some programs which are originally under the copyright of JKN, there will be no broadcasting on the cable and satellite channel. During its aforementioned time, the station will open an informercial program instead.

On November 12, 2023, Sonthiyan Chuenruthainaitham write a message that it will make his resignation from Top News in all occupation, but he is still remain as the biggest shareholder of the channel and its company Top News Digital Media Co., Ltd.

== Presenters ==
=== Current ===
- Kanok Ratwongsakul
- Thira Thanpaiboon
- Santisuk Marongsri
- Narong Suthirak
- Udon Saengarun
- Sathaporn Kuasakul
- Nititar Chaopayak
- Ubolrat Thaonoi
- Worathep Suwatthanaphim
- Wittayen Muttara
- Takerng Somsap
- Rungratree Suhongsa
- Wootthinan Nahim
- Chanutra Petchmoon
- Sirawit Chaikasem
- Phonsawan Jarupan
- Pracha Harirakakphithak
- Amorn Taeudomkul
- Chayathorn Thanaworachet
- Chiratwat Siributr
- Athitchan Khuharuengrong
- Salinna Phuiam
- Tharawut Ritthiaksorn
- Padungsin Srichaiyo
- Laksika Paethong
- Supornthip Thepchanta
- Kantaphon Bungwai
- Kornsuda Wiratat
- Sitsiya Wisutprani
- Boonradom Jitdon
- Sayan Klomsakorn
- Witthayen Muttamara

=== Former ===
- Tawanrung Parisuttidham (now at MONO29)
- Kittima Thararattanakil (now at NEWS1)
- Manut Tangsuk (now at Channel 5 HD)
- Tawaree Tantrawat (now a freelance host)
- Sukanya Boonchuan (still working as an employee at TOP News)
- Prinya Ketsarathikul (died on 5 November 2021)
- Nantakwang Sirasoontorn (now at Amarin TV)
- Rungnapha Suhongsa
- Anchalee Paireerak (now at Naewna)
- Jarunee Suksawat
- Sonthiyan Chuenruthainaitham
