= JKN =

JKN may refer to:

- JKN Global Group, a Thai multinational conglomerate
  - Anne JKN, a Thai businesswoman and the founder
- Jaminan Kesehatan Nasional, a universal healthcare system launched by the Indonesian government
