= TNN16 (Thai TV channel) =

24-hour news channel

TNN
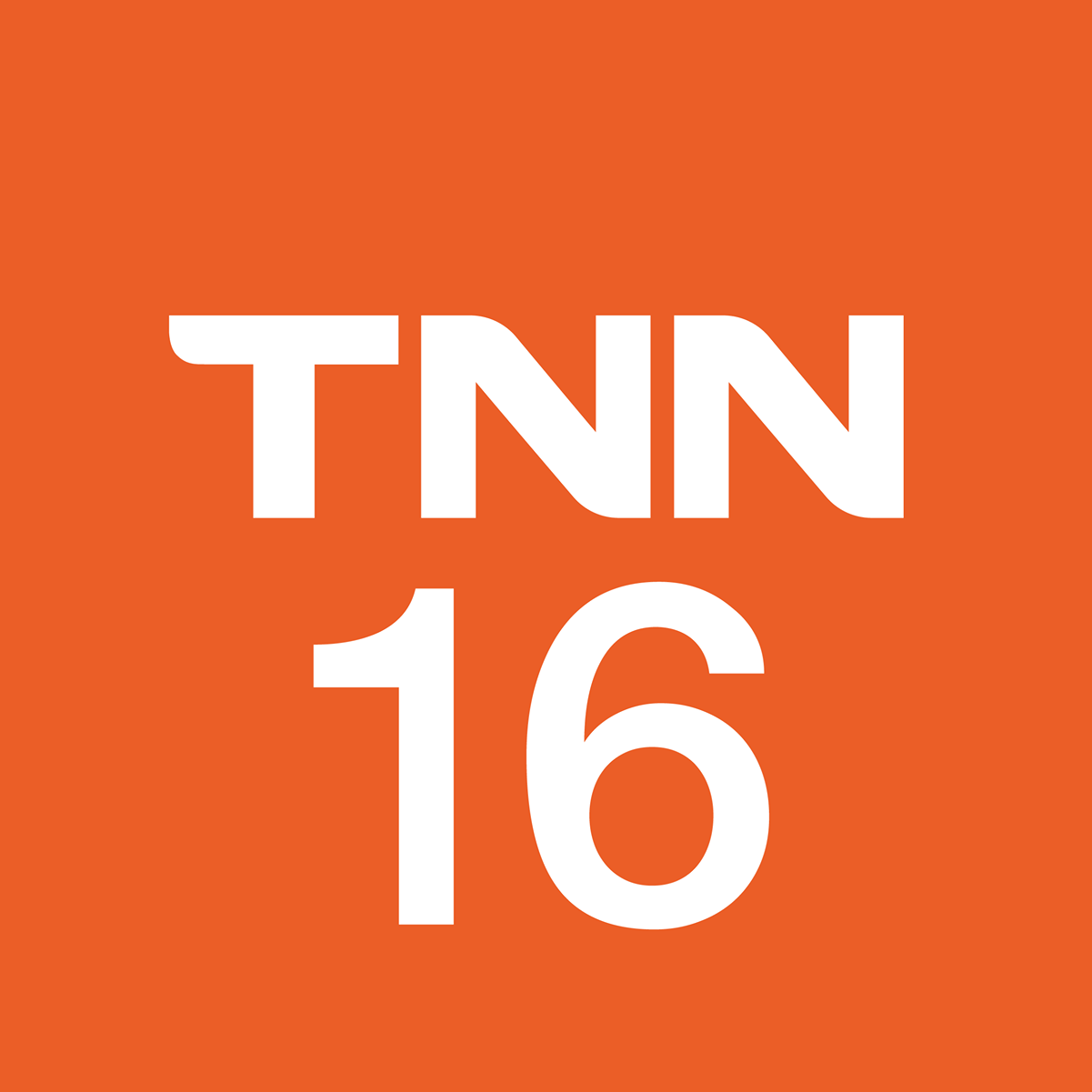
- Country: Thailand
- Broadcast area: Thailand; Malaysia (Perlis, Kedah, Perak, Kelantan); Myanmar (areas of Tachileik, Myawaddy, parts of Mawlamyine, and southernmost part of Tanintharyi Region); Cambodia (border areas of Oddar Meanchey, Banteay Meanchey, Pailin, parts of Battambang and Koh Kong provinces); Mekong river areas in Laos (including Vientiane); Vietnam; Southeast Asia (via Satellite)
- Headquarters: 101 True Digital Park, Sukhumvit Road, Bang Chak subdistrict, Phra Khanong, Bangkok, Thailand

Programming
- Language: Thai
- Picture format: 576i SDTV; 1080i HDTV

Ownership
- Owner: Thai News Network (TNN) Co., Ltd. (a unit of TrueVisions, a subsidiary of True Corporation, part of Arise Ventures Group and the Charoen Pokphand Group)
- Sister channels: TNN2

History
- Launched: Satellite system: 17 May 1989; 37 years ago 1 January 2008; 18 years ago (as TNN); 9 September 2008; 18 years ago (official launch as TNN); Terrestrial digital: 1 April 2014; 12 years ago Satellite and digital: 2 December 2015; 10 years ago
- Former names: IBC 3 (1989 – 1997); IBC News (1997 – 1998); UBC News (1998 – 2006); UBC/True News 24 (2006 – 2007); TNN24 (2007 – 2019)

Links
- Website: www.tnnthailand.com

Availability

Terrestrial
- Digital terrestrial television: Channel 16 (SD) (TV5 MUX2)

Streaming media
- TNN: Watch live

TNN16 (Thai: ทีเอ็นเอ็น ช่อง 16), an acronym for Thai News Network is a Thai broadcast television news channel owned by Thai News Network (TNN) Co., Ltd., a unit of TrueVisions, a subsidiary of True Corporation, part of Arise Ventures Group and the Charoen Pokphand Group, presents news, documentaries and sport news.

TNN16 has a sister channel called TNN2.

== History ==
=== Earlier History ===
TNN16 was founded as IBC 3 on 17 May 1989. It was one of the first seven channels broadcasting on IBC satellite television platform on channel 1.

Later, on 1 November 1997, IBC 3 rebranded to IBC News and reformed its format to present news only.

On 1 July 1998, after IBC reached an agreement to merge with the UTV Cable Network and formed UBC, IBC News rebranded to UBC News and continue to broadcast on UBC channel 7. On 1 September 2003, UBC News got a new look, add a new image to consider as a news channel, consistent with the change of the UBC logo.

In 2006, the channel rebranded to UBC News 24, later known as True News 24 as the network was rebranding to TrueVisions in 2007.

=== TNN ===
In 2008, True News 24 rebranded to TNN and split into two channels. TNN24 became a 24-hour news channel and TNN2 now broadcasts in-depth news and documentaries.

TNN24 officially launched on 9 September 2008 on TrueVisions channel 7. The following year, on 9 September 2009, its website was launched.

On 1 January 2010, TNN launched its radio station TNN Radio (Thai: ทีเอ็นเอ็น เรดิโอ), broadcast on the Royal Thai Army Radio Station JS 2, Department of Military Communications FM 103.0 MHz, bringing live news programming from TNN24 into a radio format parallel to the television broadcast. It ceased broadcasting in 2011.

In 2010, TNN24 launched its free-to-air service on Thaicom 5 both K_{u} band and C band and also launch its channel on other subscription television provider, PSI and DTV.

Thai News Network (TNN) Co., Ltd. was established on 17 August 2011 to become the subsidiary of TrueVisions and serves as the owner of the channel.

On 1 March 2012, TNN24 started to air its high-definition channel on TrueVisions cable TV service on channel 124 and expanded to broadcast on satellite service after that.

In April 2014, TNN24 began broadcasting on digital terrestrial television on channel 16 after it was awarded a digital TV license in December 2013.

The channel has the same channel number on every platform due to the Must-carry rule provided by National Broadcasting and Telecommunications Commission (NBTC) but was still broadcast on TrueVisions channel 7 until the NBTC made an order to force TrueVisions to move the channel to number 16 in 2016.

In February 2019, TNN24 rebranded to TNN16, but still broadcast on TrueVisions in HD, Channel 117 and 777 as before. It aims to be the number 1 digital TV business news channel in Thailand and began to merge with some of True4U's news team. Then on 18 November, the same year, expanded the studio for filming more news programs on True Tower 2, Pattanakarn Road, which used alongside its original studio at Tipco Tower, Rama 6 Road, which is currently in use and from 2 January 2020, the channel started its additional channels simulcast on True4U (similar to Sky TG24 simulcast on Cielo in Italy and Now News Channel simulcast on Viu TV in Hong Kong.)

On 11 April 2023, TNN16 moved its studios on some of its programs including TNN Praden Yai, TNN World Today and TNN Tech Reports, to True Digital Park, Sukhumvit Road, replacing the original studios used in True Tower 2, Phatthanakan Road. However, the office and studios at True Tower 2, Pattanakarn Road, and Tipco Tower 2, Rama 6 Road, was still used until 15 April and 7 May, respectively, when it fully moved its office and studios to True Digital Park on 16 April for the main studio (Studio 1) and 8 May for the second studio (Studio 2 Glass House), respectively. However, the second studio (Studio 2 Glass House) was first used on 3 May for the 2nd TNN Thai Election 2023 Debate special program and on 6 May for the special event dedicated to the coronation of King Charles III, respectively.

== Presenters ==
=== Current ===
- Chake Rattanatangtrakul (Pop) (2019–present) (former ITV, TITV, 9MCOT HD, Channel 7 and Channel 3 anchor and former Eazy FM 102.5 presenter) (Executive Editor of the News Division)
- Khaunchanok Charoenpakupaisarn (Kae) (2007–present) (former RTA 5 and Channel 3 anchor)
- Niratchaya Monthong (Pumpuy) (2007–present) (former ITV reporter)
- Rawicha Tangsubut (Ritcha) (Original Nickname and Name: Kwang Pimrawee Tangsubut) (2019–present) (former RTA 5 and PPTV anchor)
- Warunwan Warasin (Ploii) (2020–present) (former Rawangpai 24, 9MCOT HD and True4U anchor and reporter)
- Chawan Chandradrabya (Game) (2021–present) (former Channel 3, Channel 7 and Nation TV anchor and reporter)
- Polawat Pupipat (New) (2018–present) (former Krungthepthurakij TV and RTA 5 anchor, also working at Royal Thai Army Radio News Center)
- Elizabeth Sadler Leenanuchai (Liza) (2022–present) (former RTA 5, Workpoint TV, Channel 3, PPTV, ONE31 and GMM25 anchor)
- Kanjana Thapjean (Ju) (2014–present) (former NEWS1 and Post News anchor)
- Kewalee Paladkong (Fill) (2024–present) (former Nation TV reporter)
- Renuvajra Sunandavongs (Seiryu) (2024–present)
- Laphatpalin Lertthraphatwong (Pingping) (Original Name and Surname: Thawaree Tuntrawat) (2024–present) (former NBT, Top News and Channel 5 anchor)
- Monai Yenbutra (Mo) (2019–present) (former Nation TV and True4U anchor)
- Chonticha Asavanich (Am) (Original Family Name: Sarppaiboonlert) (2019–present) (former 9MCOT HD and ONE31 anchor and former Eazy FM 102.5 presenter)
- Natchawee Wanitsurang (Nat) (Original Name: Sujaree Theparwut (Su) and later Nutcharee Pattanawongpokin) (1998–present)
- Anthiya Naetirapeesak (Deedee) (Original Name: Reawadee Sae-tan) (2014–present) (former TNews reporter and former News 44 anchor)
- Kulacha Tangmahasuk (Pae) (2008–present) (former ITV and TITV reporter) (host of the two editions of Khao Dang Sudsapda, also working as a reporter)
- Thunramon Paisarnsoontornkit (Pae) (2014–present)
- Thanyaporn Suwannarat (Nok) (2014-present)
- Thanchanok Jongyotying (Micky) (2019–present) (former 9MCOT HD, Spring News, Spring 26 anchor and correspondent and FM 100.5 MCOT News presenter) (Executive Editor of the Online News Division)
- Phat Jintanakun (Pui) (2019–present) (former Nation TV and True4U anchor, reporter and correspondent) (Executive Editor of the International News Division)
- Varin Sachdev (Vee) (2000–present) (former Spring News, FM 100.5 MCOT News Network, NEWS1 and Station 101 presenter) (also working at TrueVisions and FM 96.5 Thinking Radio)
- Pichayapa Sutabutra (Grace) (2022–present) (former MONO29 and Channel 7 anchor and reporter)
- Chanchai Pratheepwatanawong (Dow) (2024–present) (former Voice TV and Nation TV anchor) (Deputy Editor of the International News Division)
- Treechada Choktanasermsakul (Numnim) (2025–present) (former PPTV and The Standard anchor) (Content Editor of the International News Division)
- Sopon Navarattanapong (Jia) (2021–present) (former 9MCOT HD anchor)
- Chayathip Lojanakosin (Yuu) (2016, 2022–present) (former Krungthepthurakij TV and PPTV anchor)
- Banphot Thanapermsuk (Eig) (2019–present) (former Money Channel, MONO29, Channel 3 and JKN-CNBC anchor)
- Titikorn Tipmontien (Tak) (2020–present) (former ITV, Money Channel, Channel 3, Money & Banking Television and JKN-CNBC anchor and reporter and former Eazy FM 102.5 presenter, also working at FM 106 Family News Radio)
- Thawanrat Denlertchaikul (Ammy) (2020–present) (former NOW26 and Money & Banking Television anchor and reporter)
- Sinida Petchveerakul (Palmy) (2021–present) (former Money Channel, RTA 5, Thairath TV, Amarin TV and JKN-CNBC anchor)
- Taweerat Jiradilok (Ann) (2010-2017, 2019–present) (former Money Channel, Channel 3 and GMM25 anchor)
- Nuttapong Namsirikul (Pop) (2021–present) (former Thai PBS anchor, also working at FM 96.5 Thinking Radio)
- Monchai Wongkittikraiwan (Lek) (2019–present) (former NOW26 anchor and FM 100.5 MCOT News Network presenter, also working at BizKlass)
- Wanvanissh Passorntanapichai (Praew) (Original Name: Sineenart Swadpoon) (2019–present) (former Money Channel and NEW18 anchor)
- Passavee Thitiphonwattanakul (Pen) (2019–present) (former ITV, TITV and Voice TV anchor and reporter)
- Jiratti Kuntipalo (Pub) (2022–present) (former Money Channel and NEW18 anchor)
- Thanawan Panthachot (Moui) (2021–present) (former Nation TV anchor and Money Club presenter) (host of Wealth Live every Monday to Friday)
- Parin Jeasuwan (It) (Original Name: Pitchan) (2014–present) (former PPTV and NBT anchor, also working at Goodtime Radio 88.5FM)
- Klanarong Machoke (Kla) (2020–present) (former Siamsport and True4U anchor and reporter) (also working at TrueVisions)
- Krisana Theetipariwat (Wanmai) (2014-present) (former T Sports reporter) (also working as a sports reporter)
- Chatdao Jangwangkorn (Dao) (2021–present) (Executive Editor of the Health News Division and host of TNN Health)
- Panpilai Pukahuta (Oh) (2007–present) (host of the interview segment of TNN Health, also a producer of the program)
- Chol Wachananont (Cholly) (2013-2019, 2020–present) (former Beartai presenter) (Executive Editor of the Technology News Division)
- Ekachai Tananchai (Gun) (2022–present) (former Voice TV reporter)
- Areeya Jaisook (Frame) (2022-present)
- Tima Sookpream (Jane) (2022-present) (former INN anchor)
- Sunida Swatdiponphallop (Toey) (2022–present) (Executive Editor of the Weather News Division) (former RTA 5 anchor)
- Suhatcha Swatdiponphallop (Tang) (2022–present) (Executive Editor of the Weather News Division) (former RTA 5 anchor)
- Natthiprada Eurpibulwatana (Pan) (2012–present) (former NEWS1 and RTA 5 anchor) (Signed under Media Associated's Money & Banking Channel (formerly known as Money & Banking Television))
- Thikamporn Ukamnerd (Nazz) (2023–present) (former Channel 3, Channel 8 and GMM25 anchor) (Also signed under Media Associated's Money & Banking Channel (formerly known as Money & Banking Television))
- Chaiya Yimwilai (2020–present)

=== Former ===
- Kritika Korpaibul (Kuk) (2008-2011)
- Jirayu Chudhabuddhi (Game) (2008-2014)
- Shanwit Chaisiriwong (Zen) (2012-2015)
- Angkanang Maimongkol (Aoy) (2008-2021) (now at Amarin TV)
- Pimwijit Sopon (Pim) (2008-2014)
- Nattakorn Devakula (Pleum) (2008-2009)
- Suthipongse Thatphithakkul (Heart) (2008-2016)
- Chamanun Wanwinwasara (Ake) (2010-2012)
- Baramee Nawanopratsakul (Yod) (2008-2009)
- Siriboon Nattapan (Ying) (2014-2018) (now a freelance host, the owner of Sarasilp Thaivision and Thai Post journalist)
- Polakit Reungjarat (2008-2014) (now a head of news division of MONO29)
- Damrong Puttan (2017-2018)
- Cholvit Jearajit (2017-2018)
- Kanda Srithamupatham (Nan) (2010-2016)
- Sujitra Amitphai (Jay) (2008-2011) (now a Deputy Head of Customer Service Management at Charoen Pokphand Group)
- Suttada Natiphanon (Buddy) (2013-2015)
- Wanchai Sornsiri (2011-2013, 2016-2019)
- Ratchapong Lhaowanich (Koh) (2016-2019)
- Patchara Chanthawanich (Jade) (Original Name: Jessada Chandranakee and later Puwanetnarin Chandranakee) (2008-2014)
- Supatra Somthawanich (Mam) (2004-2019) (now at Suwannabhumi TV)
- Thitinan Chaninwong (Nong) (2004-2018)
- Salilathip Thippayakraisorn (Nint) (2008-2017) (now a Consultant at CP All)
- Puwanart Kunpalin (Un) (2008-2014)
- Prasoppasok Kongsilp (Mei) (2008-2018)
- Laphatnitsa Worapakdee (Mod) (2018-2019)
- Jakkarat Chotidamrong (Earth) (2008-2018) (now a voice actor at TrueVisions)
- Tosapong Rattana (Tos) (2008-2018) (now a sports commentator at TrueVisions)
- Khemasorn Nukao (Milk) (2007-2008) (now at Thairath TV)
- Pat Jungkankul (Lookbid) (2018-2019)
- Parada Thanasrichai (Mail) (2008-2013)
- Ornlada Phaowibul (Jeab) (2009-2015)
- Pattanapong Saengtham (Pat) (2015-2019)
- Chanyar Pakornpat (Chanyar) (2008-2014) (now at Channel 8)
- Chairat Thomya (2000-2001, 2007-2008) (now at NHK World)
- Arisara Kumthorncharoen (Muay) (2008-2014) (now at Channel 3)
- Theppakit Chatsuriyawong (Pikth) (2019-2020) (now at Channel 8)
- Sutthida Ketwit (Phueng) (2008-2019)
- Tin Chokkamolkij (Tin) (2012-2019) (now at Channel 7)
- Worraporn Sansuk (Ae) (2014-2015) (now at Channel 8)
- Kitthikorn Silapadontree (Benz) (2015-2019) (now at Workpoint TV)
- Nuttanant Temchotikosol (Kwan) (Original Name: Thanyarat) (2018-2019) (now at Thairath TV)
- Chalermporn Tantikanjanakul (Boyz) (2012-2014) (now at 9MCOT HD)
- Sataporn Riyapa (Au) (2008-2013) (now at Nation TV)
- Siranuch Rojanasthien (Jan) (2008-2017) (now a Vice President of Corporate Communications at AIA)
- Chanitnun Punnanithi (May) (2000-2019) (now at Channel 8)
- Warinmat Panyadee (Guitar) (2016-2019) (now at Trader KP and Spacebar)
- Suchathip Munsinthorn (Ploy) (Original Family Name: Chirayunont) (2004-2019) (now at RTA 5)
- Suphinya Roopkhamdee (Suki) (2004-2018) (now a Manager of Communication, Organization and Publicity at Charoen Pokphand Foods)
- Sasicha Rattanathawon (Ae) (2008-2014)
- Rampirat Chanhom (2008-2014)
- Samparn Sirijiwanon (2008-2014)
- Patcholathorn Worrathamwong (2008-2014)
- Chawanluck Derekwattananukul (Fai) (2011-2014)
- Ponpareuk Reungjarat (2008-2014)
- Nicha Reungkade (Fai) (2014-2017)
- Prasobchok Kongsilp (Meay) (Original Family Name: Serngwongsat) (2014-2018)
- Paworn Kitcharoenkarnkul (2014-2017)
- Paksincha Rai (Punpun) (2014-2017)
- Sumita Jantaro (Bonne) (2014-2017)
- Jiraporn Kuhakarn (2014-2017)
- Yanichsa Sirimulakul (Pen) (2014-2018)
- Danai Kertmongkol (2014-2017)
- Wuttipan Paeramasawad (Fluke) (2008-2017)
- Natwarin Thongprasert (Ying) (2008-2018)
- Nattapan Reungchan (Aom) (2014-2015)
- Kittima Wongsawad (Maysa) (2014-2015)
- Chinnawat Surussavadee (2015-2016)
- Natchanan Sonthi (2015-2018)
- Jitsupa Chin (Sueching) (2019-2020) (now at Spin9)
- Atichan Chernsawano (Au) (2019-2020) (now at Spin9)
- Ticha Suthitham (Sos) (2004-2010)
- Nattichakorn Kalumpranun (Oil) (2008-2020, 2024–) (now at Suwannabhumi TV)
- Mechaka Supichayangkul (Zen) (2011-2014) (now at Channel 3 and Flex 104.5)
- Rynn Yongwattana (Lin) (2008-2018)
- Chareeda Phromyothi (Pomme) (Original Name: Parichart) (2019) (now a Foreign News Editor at eFinanceThai)
- Chanida Prasomsuk (Mameow) (2011-2013, 2019) (now at MJ Channel)
- Kamolchanok Pukayaporn (Ant) (2019)
- Siratthaya Issarabhakdi (Fern) (Original Family Name: Chaechew) (2015, 2019-2020) (now at Wealth Me Up and The Standard Wealth)
- Wit Sittivaekin (Wit) (2019-2020) (now at The Standard Wealth)
- Suthichai Yoon (2019) (now at Suthichai Live, Thai PBS and PPTV)
- Naowarat Charoenpraphin (Nao) (2019-2021) (now at Money Chat)
- Orakarn Jivakiet (Kwang) (2020) (now at Nation TV)
- Atishart Wongwuttiwat (Ong) (2016-2021) (now at Nation TV)
- Suta Sudhepichetpun (Nui) (2019-2021) (now at 9MCOT HD)
- Suthakorn Suthisonthi (2020-2021)
- Kanyarat Pimsawat (Doy) (2008-2021) (now at GMM25)
- Mattanin Maneekhao (Mook) (Original Name: Thanikarn) (2018-2021) (now a freelance host)
- Kreangkraimas Photjanasuntorn (Kendo) (2019-2021) (now at PPTV)
- Kamonphorn Worrakul (Kae) (2019-2021) (now at Amarin TV)
- Amornrat Mahitthirook (2020-2021) (now at 9MCOT HD)
- Samittra Kleabbuppha (Lookpla) (2021)
- Arithatch Thangsanga (Kang) (2021)
- Natchaya Sanguansuk (Lookapad) (2021-2022)
- Sarut Vithuwinit (Chai) (2018-2022) (now a sports commentator at TrueVisions and NBT)
- Chamaiporn Heanprasert (Yui) (2018-2022) (now at Thai PBS, T Sports 7, Main Stand and FM 99 Active Radio)
- Watit Trikrutaphan (Tob) (2016-2022) (now at Channel 7)
- Sukunya Chaipasee (Neng) (2019–2023)
- Vimonwan Setthatavorn (Ying) (2012–2023) (Signed under Media Associated's Money & Banking Channel (formerly known as Money & Banking Television))
- Supaporn Eldredge (Kookai) (2020–2023) (now a creative director of SUPA East Glamor)
- Pawinee Sawaengsuk (Aoey) (2021–2023)
- Chart Pattanakulkarnkit (Bank) (2021–2023)
- Parnsit Vichayakupt (Tum) (2018–2023) (now a sports commentator at TrueVisions and presenter at FM 99 Active Radio)
- Palida Hongkrajang (Praew) (2021–2023)
- Chutima Jirasubanan (Aing) (2015–2016, 2022–2023)
- Panadda Prasithimaykul (Aui) (2014–2023)
- Nattachar Kijmoke (Minnie) (2022–2024) (now at Thai PBS)
- Pritchaya Thapprachan (2014-2023)
- Sopa Chantarumai (Joy) (2021–2024) (now working as an employee at TNN Channel 16)
- Piyaluck Rakpratanporn (Mu) (2021–2024)
- Adisorn Piungya (Noom, commonly known as Jackie) (2019–2024) (now working at Siamsport, Channel 7 HD and TrueVisions)
- Rittikorn Karaweg (Oat) (2008–2014, 2019–2024) (now working at FM 99 Active Radio and TrueVisions)
- Jessada Salathong (Jess) (2020–2024) (now working at FM 100.5 MCOT News)
- Nattanon Charoenchai (Natnon) (2024–2025)
- Pathomphob Inbamrung (Thomm) (2022–2026) (now working at TrueVisions
- Theerayut Bannongsa (Fluke) (2020–2026) (now working at Fluke Family)

== Identity ==
=== Logos ===
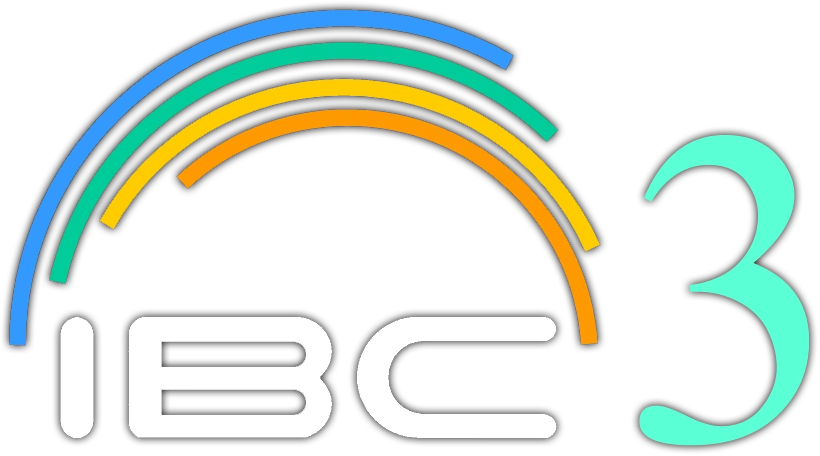
Logo used during IBC 3 era from 17 May 1989 to 1 November 1997

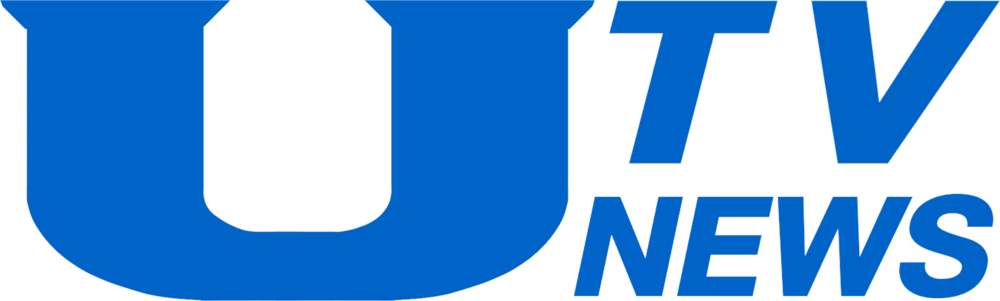
Logo used during UTV News era from 1 February to 30 June 1998

Logo used from 1 January 2008 to 1 February 2019

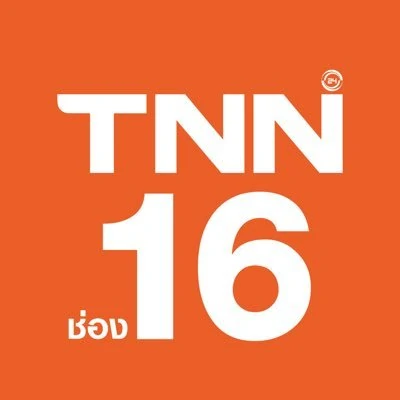
Logo used from 1 February 2019 to 1 June 2020

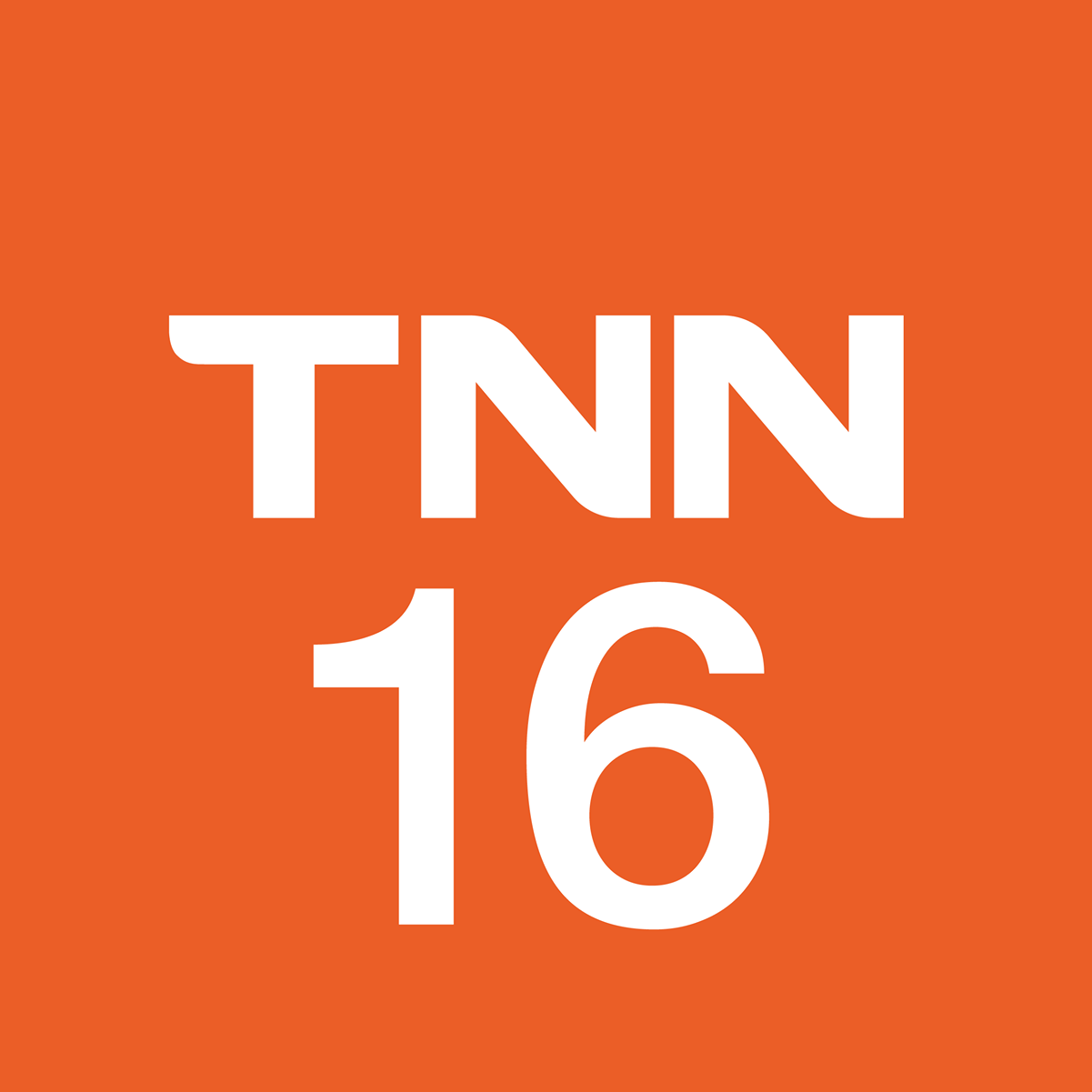
Logo used from 1 June 2020 to the present

=== Slogans ===
- 2010-2019: ทันทุกความจริง (Keep Up with All Facts)
- 2019–present: ทันโลก ทันเศรษฐกิจ ทันทุกความจริง (Keep Up with the World, Economy and All Facts) (used for main purposes)
- 2022–present: ทันโลก ทันเศรษฐกิจ ทันทุกความจริง ทันทุกแพลตฟอร์ม (Keep Up with the World, Economy, All Facts and All Platforms) (used for other purposes, as well as the monthly program schedule update on the website)
