= Project Runway Thailand =

- Genre: Reality competition
- Created by: Eli Holzman
- Starring: Anne Jakrajutatip; Ek Thongprasert; Kwankao Svetavimala
- Country of origin: Thailand
- No. of seasons: 1
- No. of episodes: 13

Production
- Running time: 90 minutes

Original release
- Network: JKN18
- Release: May 7 – July 30, 2022

Project Runway Thailand is a Thai reality television show based on the American program Project Runway, wherein fashion designers compete by making specific garments for weekly challenges. The show features Anne Jakrajutatip as the host, along with Ek Thongprasert and Kwankao Svetavimala as judges. Tawn Chatchawanwong acts as a mentor to the contestants, as Tim Gunn does in the American version. The winner of Project Runway Thailand receives a cash prize of ฿1,000,000 to start their career.

The series premiered on Saturday, May 7, 2022, at 19:00 p.m. on JKN18. On July 30, Apisit Permlab (nickanme Folk) won the competition over Thossapol Kerdkaew (nickname Tay) and Pawit Prawat (nickname Veed), who both took second place respectively.

In February 2023, it was confirmed that a second season is in production, but the series had been canceled and would not be returning.

== Series overview ==
=== Seasons ===
Season	Premiere date	Finale date	No. of designers	Winner	Runner-up	Prizes
1	May 7, 2022	July 30, 2022	15	Folk Permlab	Tay Kerdkaew & Veed Prawat	฿1,000,000 to start his own line

== Contestants ==
(ages listed are the designers' ages at the time the show was taped.)

Contestant	Nickname	Age	Hometown	Finish	Outcome
Isares Kamonnawin	Ice	25	Bangkok	Episode 1	15
Weeneggsinn Kaewphongsri	Frank	49	Bangkok	Episode 2	14
Sataphon Jamsri	Nueng	26	Ang Thong	Episode 3	13
Vorapol Suporn	Brasbas	31	Bangkok	Episode 4	12-11
Nanteerada Sukampeeranon	Miu	33	Bangkok	Episode 4	12-11
Nattawika Boonard	Prawpreaw	26	Khon Kaen	Episode 5	10
Anurak Mukem	Taii	29	Hat Yai	Episode 7	9-8
Pongwit Tangkiatphaibun	Titee	27		Episode 7	9-8
Khmik Sittirak	Joe	29	Nakhon Ratchasima	Episode 8	7
Borvornpat Plyngam	Tae	31	Bangkok	Episode 9	6
Somphop Phanichanurak	Nam	20	Maha Sarakham	Episode 10	5
Paniti Sungkakun	Boss	33		Episode 12	4
Thossapol Kerdkaew	Tay	29		Episode 13	3–2
Pawit Prawat	Veed	22	Phatthalung	Episode 13	3–2
Apisit Permlab	Folk	26		Episode 13	1

== Designer progress ==
Elimination Chart
Designers	1	2	3	4^{1}	5^{2}	6^{3}	7	8	9	10^{4}	12	13	Eliminated Episode
Folk	IN	IN	HIGH	HIGH	HIGH	WIN	WIN	IN	HIGH	LOW	IN	WINNER	13 – Finale Part 2
Tay	WIN	IN	IN	WIN	WIN	LOW	LOW	WIN	LOW	SAFE	LOW	RUNNER UP	13 – Finale Part 2
Veed	IN	IN	IN	LOW	IN	IN	IN	LOW	WIN	IN	IN	RUNNER UP	13 – Finale Part 2
Boss	IN	HIGH	LOW	IN	HIGH	HIGH	HIGH	LOW	LOW	IN	OUT		12 - Finale Part 1
Nam	LOW	HIGH	LOW	LOW	HIGH	LOW	IN	LOW	LOW	OUT			10 – Tribal Fashion
Tae	HIGH	IN	HIGH	IN	LOW	IN	HIGH	HIGH	OUT				9 – Avant-Garde Fashion
Joe	IN	IN	WIN	IN	IN	HIGH	IN	OUT					8 - An LGBTQ Wedding
Taii	IN	WIN	IN	HIGH	LOW	HIGH	OUT						7 – Ready-to-Wear
Titee	IN	IN	IN	IN	HIGH	IN	OUT						6 – Kids and Fashion
Prawpreaw	IN	IN	IN	HIGH	OUT								5 – Red Carpet Fashion
Brasbas	IN	LOW	IN	OUT									4 – TV, Music & Fashion with Violette Wautier
Miu	LOW	LOW	IN	OUT									4 – TV, Music & Fashion with Violette Wautier
Nueng	IN	IN	OUT										3 – Upcycled Couture
Frank	HIGH	OUT											2 – Unconventional Materials
Ice	OUT					WIN							1 – Deconstruct Thai Traditional Costumes

- ^Note 1: Although Nam & Tay win the design challenge as a pair, only Tay is save and Nam is in the bottom.
- ^Note 2: Although Boss, Folk, Nam, Tay & Titee win the design challenge as a team, Tay have the best design as individual. However, in the next episode, the show has to strip out Tay's win for using outside materials in his design.
- ^Note 3: Folk can not compete in the design challenge due to health issue and as a result, Ice was invited to be his substitute for the challenge.
- ^Note 4: In episode 10, Tawn Chatchawanwong decided to use his "Save" on Tay, canceling out his elimination.

The designer won Project Runway Thailand.
The designer won that challenge.
The designer had the second highest score for that challenge.
The designer had one of the highest scores for that challenge.
The designers had one of the lowest scores for that challenge.
The designer was in the bottom two, but was not eliminated.
The designer lost, but was brought back to the competition by Tawn Chatchawanwong.
The designer lost and was eliminated from the competition.
