= Anchalee Paireerak =

Thai journalist and political activist

- อัญชะลี ไพรีรัก
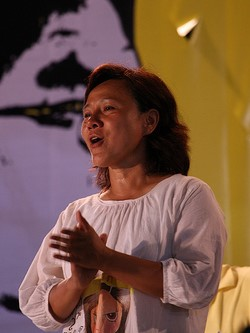
- Anchalee Paireerak in 2008
- Born: October 25, 1962 (age 63); Samut Prakan, Thailand
- Occupations: Journalist, news presenter, political activist
- Years active: 1980s–present
- Known for: People's Alliance for Democracy (PAD), People's Democratic Reform Committee (PDRC)
- Political party: Puea Pandin Party; New Politics Party

Anchalee Paireerak (Thai: อัญชะลี ไพรีรัก; born 25 October 1962) is a Thai journalist, news presenter, and political activist. She is known for her involvement with the People's Alliance for Democracy (PAD) and the People's Democratic Reform Committee (PDRC).

== Early life and education ==
Anchalee was born in Samut Prakan, Thailand. She studied at Satri Samut Prakan School and Matthayom Wat That Thong School, and later graduated from the Faculty of Communication Arts at Bangkok University.

== Career ==
Anchalee began her career as a newspaper reporter before becoming a television news presenter. She has worked with several media outlets, including Channel 7, New TV, Nation TV, and Top News. She is currently associated with Naewna.

== Political involvement ==
She became widely known during protests against Prime Minister Thaksin Shinawatra and later joined the People's Alliance for Democracy. She also played a role in the 2013–2014 Thai political crisis as part of the People's Democratic Reform Committee.

In the late 2007 general election, she contested the Samut Prakan constituency 2 as a candidate for the Puea Pandin Party. She was closely associated with several of the party's senior figures, including Wattana Asavahame and Man Phatnothai, who were prominent politicians in Samut Prakan. However, she was ultimately unsuccessful in the election.
