= Thepthai Senapong =

Thai politician

- เทพไท เสนพงศ์
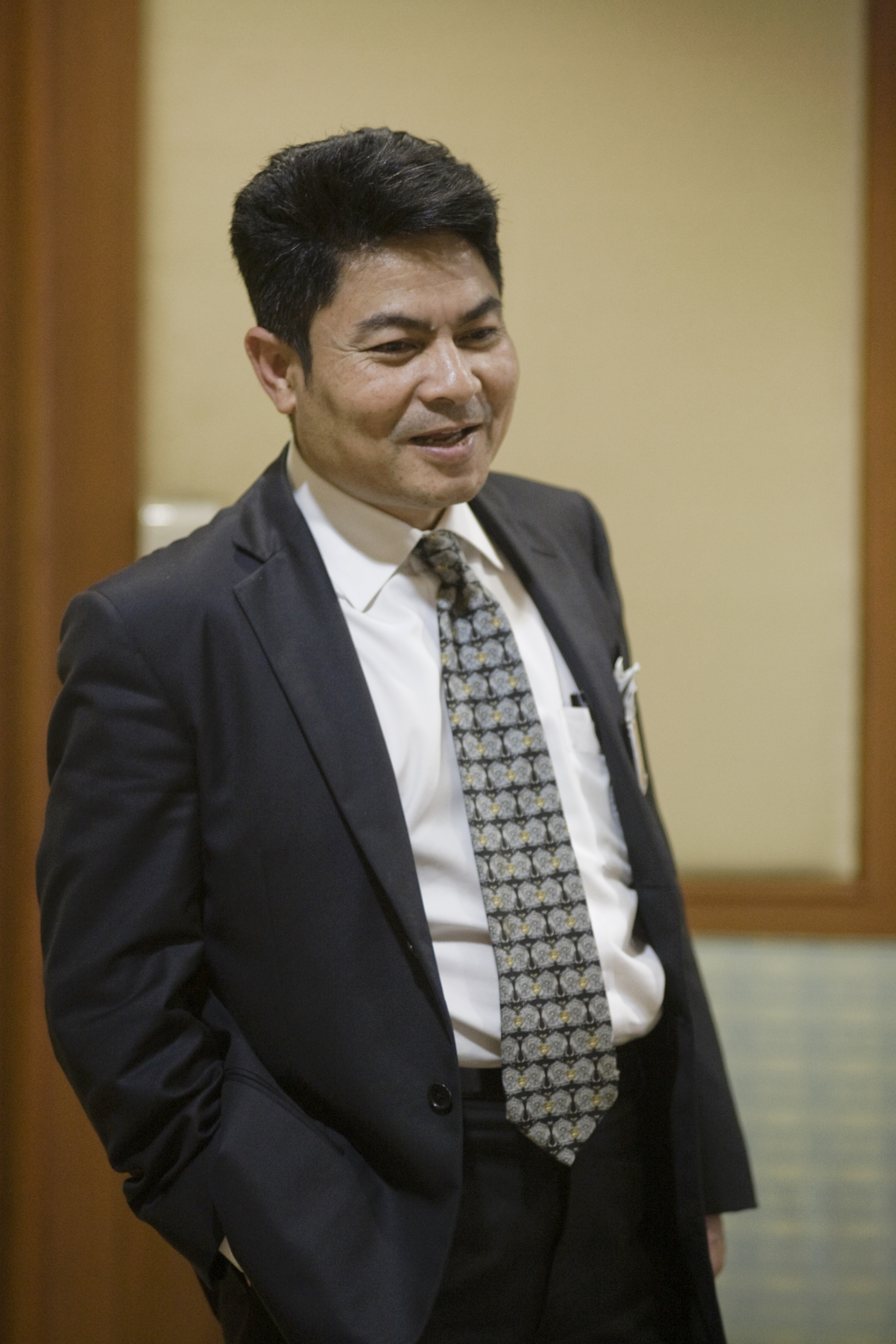
- Thepthai Senapong in 2010
- Born: Thepthai Senapong; March 12, 1961 (age 65); Chian Yai, Nakhon Si Thammarat, Thailand
- Other name: The Kuk (เดอะคึก)
- Education: Ramkhamhaeng University; NIDA
- Occupations: Politician; lawyer; political commentator; YouTuber
- Years active: 2005–2022
- Political party: Democrat Party
- Spouse: Porpen Senapong (née: Roengprasertwit)
- Children: Pimthai Senapong; Tanthai Senapong

Signature
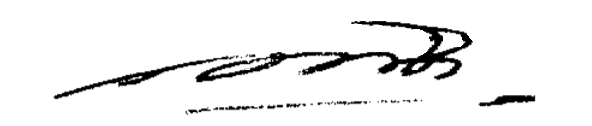

Thepthai Senapong (Thai: เทพไท เสนพงศ์; RTGS: Thepthai Senaphong; nickname: Kuk; RTGS: คึก Khuek) is a Thai Democrat Party politician who former representative Nakhon Si Thammarat in the House of Representatives.

== Political role and imprisonment ==
Senapong became the first MP from the 2005 general election and has since been MP since 2005.

In 2009 he previously served as private spokesman for Thai Prime Minister Abhisit Vejjajiva.

Between 2012 and 2014 and some of the mid-2016 he was a TV presenter for politics talk show Sai Lor Fah (สายล่อฟ้า, lit. 'lightning rod'), a TV program on BLUESKY Channel (renamed to Fahwonmai after 2014 coup d'état) on Mondays to Fridays at 07:00 to 8:00 p.m. with fellow politicians the same party are Sirichok Sopha and Chavanont Intarakomalyasut.

He served as deputy secretary-general of the Democrat Party between 2013 and 2018. In the election on March 24, 2019, he was a candidate for election in Nakhon Si Thammarat (constituency three: Phra Phrom, Chaloem Phra Kiat, Chulabhorn, Cha-uat). Senapong was elected, but in early 2021 was impeached by a resolution of the Constitutional Court for election fraud.

He was sentenced to two years in prison in July 2022 by the Supreme Court for fraud in a local election in which his brother, Manote Senapong, was a candidate in 2017. He is accused of organizing a banquet to influence the vote for Manote.

After serving 18 months in prison, in October 2023 he was released along with Manote. The condition is to wear an EM bracelet on the ankle and report to correctional officers according to the specified criteria.

After being released from prison. He announced his involvement in politics and turned himself into a political commentator through his own YouTube channel and Facebook.

== Personal life ==
Senapong is of Hainanese Chinese descent. He also has Tunisian ancestry from his maternal grandfather.

He graduated from Faculty of Law, Ramkhamhaeng University, and a master's degree from National Institute of Development Administration (NIDA). While being a student at Ramkhamhaeng University, he used to be an unlicensed cab driver for unearned income.

In addition, He is also a singer and songwriter. He had previously recorded many songs officially. Even though Senapong is not a professional singer.
