= Wanita Syurga =

2024 Malaysian television series

- Promotional poster
- Genre: Melodrama; Family; Romance
- Based on: Pelangi Tidak Berwarna (A Colourless Rainbow) by Sophilea
- Starring: Siti Khadijah Halim; Redza Rosli; Riena Diana; Nazim Othman
- Country of origin: Malaysia
- Original language: Malay
- No. of episodes: 35

Production
- Running time: 41 - 43 minutes

Original release
- Network: TV3
- Release: March 15 – May 2, 2024

Wanita Syurga (English: Woman sent from Heaven) is a 2024 Malaysian television series directed by Riza Baharudin, starring Siti Khadijah Halim, Redza Rosli, Riena Diana and Nazim Othman. It premiered on Slot Akasia, TV3 on 15 March 2024 and ended its run on 2 May of the same year at 19:00 (MST).

== Plot ==
Wanita Syurga tells the story of a woman named Ardini (Siti Khadijah) who is married and has two children, Wanna and Muqri, but her life is not perfect. She had to make sacrifices to escape from a marriage rigged by her own husband, Amar (Redza Rosli). The sacrifice made her determined to get her rights back. The arrival of Luqman (Nazim Othman), a syarie lawyer who is also a friend from Ardini's village, makes Ardini breathe again and is determined to regain her rights that were taken away by Amar and Farah (Riena Diana). Can Ardini regain her lost rights?

== Cast ==
=== Main ===
- Redza Rosli as Amar Ilhami
- Siti Khadijah Halim as Ardini Zahira
- Riena Diana as Farah Mokhtar

=== Supporting ===
- Nazim Othman as Luqman
- Marissa Yasmin as Puan Faizah
- Shah Iskandar as Firdaus
- Puteri Khareeza as Leanne
- Syazuwan Hassan as Faiz
- Wan Sharmila as Hanis
- Annie Mossha as Hayla
- Amyza Aznan as Cik Mimi
- Zamarul Hisham as Tuan Mokhtar
- Syamim Farid as Yasmeen
- Rashidah Jaafar as Maznah
- Asri as Pak Zahid
- Nafiez Zaidi as Wafdi
- Natasha Mahyan as Naily
