= Voice TV =

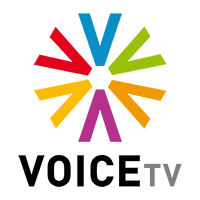
- Country: Thailand
- Headquarters: Vibhavadi Rangsit Road, Bangkok, Thailand

Programming
- Language: Thai
- Picture format: 576i (16:9 SDTV)

Ownership
- Owner: Voice TV Co., Ltd. (Note: Founded in 2003 by Panthongtae Shinawatra as How Come Entertainment Co., Ltd.)

History
- Launched: 29 June 2009; 17 years ago
- Closed: August 31, 2019; 6 years ago (Voice TV 21); 17 May 2024; 2 years ago (first issue, television broadcast); 31 May 2024; 2 years ago (originally dates for shut down broadcast; second issue, online platform)

Links
- Website: voicetv.co.th

Availability

Streaming media
- Watch live: live.voicetv.co.th

Voice TV is a Thai television channel, notable for its liberal (Except for one news program hosted by Nattakorn Devakula) and pro-Thaksin stance and political-centric analysis. It is broadcast via digital terrestrial television (from 2014 until 2019), satellite, cable (as Video To Home 2), and web streaming. It was founded and currently owned by former Prime Minister Thaksin Shinawatra's son, Panthongtae ("Oak"), through Voice TV Co., Ltd. (formerly How Come Entertainment Co., Ltd.).

== Programming ==
=== News and analysis ===
- Wake Up Thailand
- Talking Thailand
- Voice Focus
- The Daily Dose : World of Politics
- Sum Hua Kid
- Mong Lok Mong Thai

== Anchors and analysts ==
- Weeranun Kunha
- Patshaya Mahatanodhamma
- Nattakorn Devakula
- Sasiphong Chartphot
- Lakkhana Panwichai
- Chuwat Rerksirisuk
- Viroj Ali
- Thirat Rattanasewi
- Chonlawit Wongsriwo
- Puwanart Kunpalin
- Chaicharn Khamkhom
- Taweesak Kerdpokha
- Wanachok Chaisaad
- Passavee Thitiphonwattanakul (now at TNN16)
- Vilasinee Van Halen (now at Nation TV)
- Chanchai Pratheepwatanawong (now at Nation TV)
- Jitsupa Chin (now at Spin9)
- Chamanun Wanwinwasara
- Suchathip Munsinthorn (Original Family Name: Chirayunont) (now at Channel 5)
- Athuekkit Sawangsuk
- Pongkasem Sattayaprasert (now at Thairath TV)
- Pitch Pongsawat
- Sirote Klampaiboon
- Thima Kanchanapairin (now at One 31)

== See also ==
- Global Buddhist Network
