= Thairath TV =

Thai television channel

- Country: Thailand
- Broadcast area: Thailand; Malaysia (Perlis, Kedah, Perak, Kelantan and Terengganu); Myanmar (areas of Tachileik, Myawaddy, parts of Mawlamyine, and southernmost part of Tanintharyi Region); Cambodia (border areas of Oddar Meanchey, Banteay Meanchey, Pailin, parts of Battambang and Koh Kong provinces); Mekong river areas in Laos (including Vientiane)
- Headquarters: Thairath Newspaper Office, Vibhavadi Rangsit Road, Chatuchak, Bangkok, Thailand

Programming
- Language: Thai
- Picture format: 1080i (HDTV)

Ownership
- Owner: Triple V Broadcast Co., Ltd. Thairath; Vacharaphol Co., Ltd.

History
- Launched: Terrestrial digital: 24 April 2014; 11 years ago Satellite and digital: 2 December 2015; 10 years ago

Links
- Website: www.thairath.co.th/tv

Availability

Terrestrial
- Digital terrestrial television: Channel 32 (HD) (MCOT MUX3)

Streaming media
- My Thairath: Watch live
- Line TV: Watch live (Thailand only)

Thairath TV (Thai: ไทยรัฐทีวี) is a digital terrestrial television channel owned by Triple V Broadcast Co., Ltd., a subsidiary of the news publisher, Thairath, which was owned by Vacharaphol Co., Ltd., launched in April 2014 after they won a digital television broadcast license.

The channel operated as 24-hour television news channel with news-tensive programming mixed with entertainment and sports programs.

Thairath TV is the first television station in Thailand to broadcast LINE messages from viewer during newscasts started from 12 August 2015.

Former politicians Chuwit Kamolvisit becoming host of "Tee Sak Na" program during primetime newscast Thairath News Show in weekday editions first aired on 31 January 2017.

== History ==
From 1 April 2014, Thairath TV began a trial broadcast. through the signal transmission equipment of MCOT Public Company Limited as a test picture with Dolby sound system 5.1.

Started broadcasting on 1 April 2014 at 6:00 p.m. At 7:00 p.m., thus entering the daily news program Thairath News Show, before that, there is the live broadcast of Thairath TV Opening Ceremony held at Center Point Studio, Soi Lasalle, it was presented in the form of a TV Battle special from 7:15-9:00 PM, which previewed two new programs at a time, Then, the audience in the studio vote for both entries. When it works out which program has more points, Thairath TV will broadcast that program in the channel's earliest program chart.

=== Technology ===
Thairath TV purchased the broadcast graphics management system (Broadcast Graphics; BG) of Vizrt from Norway worth 1,400,000 US dollars, which is the world's leading television channels like CNN, BBC, Al Jazeera, CCTV, NHK purchasing for use as well, the channel also purchasing broadcasting equipment with Dolby system technology to provide broadcast sound to be clear. But later around December 2014, the Dolby system sound transmission was canceled.

From the fact that Thairath TV uses Vizrt's broadcast graphics system which keeps the graphics on screen during broadcasts. More prominent than other channels, such as before the show and before the commercial break. Identities are moving in and out all the time, including showing identity during various festivals as well.

Thairath TV is the first television station in Thailand to bring messages from the LINE application for the audience is displayed on the screen using the central LINE account of Thairath itself, Thairath TV started presenting in this way on 1 August 2015. It is displayed as a bar next to the item symbol in the lower left corner. Before in February 2017, it moved down to the bottom of the screen for continuity in displaying messages. Later, many Thai television channels, both free digital TV and satellite TV channels, each of them applied the format to each channel accordingly.

Thairath TV uses Thairath's own YouTube channel to broadcast live events such as live sports events or special events or news events that happened after, without interstitial ads, but will be replaced with various advertisements of the station (In the case of pulling signals from normal broadcasts such as the live telecasts of Toyota Muay Thai League, etc.) and pictures of the live atmosphere from the broadcast location. (In the case of using a separate signal, such as the live telecasts of Suek Yod Muay Thairath, etc.)

== Awards and recognitions ==
Thairath TV and Thailand Association of the Blind's "Blind Taste TV" campaign won four awards in 2015.

== Presenters ==
=== Current ===
- Kanchai Kamnerdploi (Num)
- Kachapa Tancharoen (Moddam)
- Kaneungnij Jaksamithanont (Rodmae)
- Chaowarit Srimunkongtham (Chaochao)
- Tassaorn Patsukcharoen (Aff)
- Napapa Tantrakul (Patt)
- Pimonwan Hoonthongkam (Pui)
- Putachart Pongsuchart (Tuitui)
- Pakpoom Parnsathit (Aui)
- Khemasorn Nukao (Milk)
- Thatsanai Kodtathong (Golf)
- Tadsathorn Wongwanich (Dorm)
- Areeya Feungpraditkul (Namkhang)
- Nachthapong Muhammad (Bird)
- Biravadhna Atthanaka (Kings)
- Nuttanant Temchotikosol (Kwan)
- Woraporn Sompong (Kraten)
- Ornsaporn Saladol (Mint)
- Seubsakul Pandee (Book)
- Pongkasem Sattayaprasert (Guy)
- Mornreudee Tannukulakij (Aui)
- Jutarat Iamamphan (Por)
- Suparb Kleekajai
- Worapath Arunpakdee (Jay)
- Krirkchai Kunnatho (Bobo)
- Thathat Winitmanon (Pub)
- Chana Detchpiratmongkol (Arm)
- Shisa Artiboonyachok (Shisa)
- Rattawarn Potsanukul (Baitong)
- Thapparit Eeumtom (Judong)
- Pattanachai Adirek (Jacqueline)
- Natyanee Rattanapaitul (Cherry)
- Pimrajit Aeuwongchai (Ploy)
- Reungkwan Kunnawong (Kwan)
- Saranpat Kasemchayawiwat (Chompoo)

=== Former ===
- Monai Yenbutra (Mo) (now at TNN16)
- Jomquan Laopetch (Kwan) (now at Jomquan social media platforms)
- Kwan Mocha (now at MONO29)
- Chairat Thomya (now at NHK World)
- Manucha Chermool (Narn) (now at T Sports 7 and Main Stand)
- Pongsuk Hiranprueck (Nui) (now at Beartai)
- Saranee Sanguanreun (Feunglada) (now at LDA World)
- Chuwit Kamolvisit
- Warantorn Somkijroonrot (now at T Sports 7 and Main Stand)
- Saksit Boonrat (now at Amarin TV)
- Wirawitch Charoenchua (now at T Sports 7)
- Masiri Klomkaew (now at PPTV)
- Supachok Opasakun (Ton) (now at Amarin TV)
- Rapeepan Reungsri (Pee) (now at Nation TV)
- Nattachar Kijmoke (Minnie) (now at TNN16)
- Tuenjai Tanasoontorn (Fon)
- Rossarin Prakobthan (Pui) (now at Channel 7)

== Identity ==
=== Slogans ===
- 2014-2015: คิดต่างอย่างเข้าใจ (Think differently with understanding)
- 2018-present: ทีวีมหาชน (The TV for the mass)

== See also ==
- List of dramas on Thairath TV
