= TV24 (Thailand) =

- Country: Thailand
- Broadcast area: Thailand
- Headquarters: 2539 Big C Ladprao Building, 5th Floor, Ladprao Road, Khlong Chao Khun Sing Subdistrict, Wang Thonglang District, Bangkok, Thailand

Programming
- Language(s): Thai
- Picture format: 576i SDTV

Ownership
- Owner: Democracy News Network Co., Ltd.
- Sister channels: SCTV; SOTV

History
- Launched: As Asia Update: 5 July 2010; 14 years ago As TV24: 4 September 2014; 10 years ago Return as Asia Update: 1 January 2020; 5 years ago
- Former names: Asia Update (2010-2014, 2020-present), TV24 (2014-2018, 2023-present)

Links
- Website: www.youtube.com/channel/UC6wrbIJ1Y8fEgdRxJSr7bZQ/

TV24 (Thai: ทีวี 24) or Asia Update (Thai: เอเซียอัปเดต) is an online news television channel in Thailand, associated with the United Front for Democracy Against Dictatorship and the Red Shirt movement. In the past, it was a cable and satellite news television channel. It was owned by Democracy News Network Co., Ltd.

== Background ==
Under the management of Democracy News Network Co., Ltd. (Thai: บริษัท เดโมเครซี นิวส์ เน็ตเวิร์ก จำกัด) was established on May 18, 2009, with an initial capital of 5 million baht, consists of Jarupong Ruangsuwan, former permanent secretary of the Ministry of Labor and former chairman of the Board of Directors of MCOT Public Company Limited and Wimol Chanjiravuttikul, Former Academic and Policy Working Group People's Power Party, becoming a director of the company to support broadcasting satellite television channels together with the Pheu Thai Party as a replacement in case of an order to suspend the broadcasting of the People's Station

Before the crackdown on the Red Shirt rally on May 19, 2010, the Abhisit government ordered the suspension of broadcasting on the People's Station. After that, the company had been preparing for a while. by June Therefore, able to begin broadcasting trials between 19:00-20:00 and broadcasting full 24 hours a day from July 5, the same year under the name Asia Update and using the sending room with old office of the people's station Which is located on the 5th floor of the Imperial World Ladprao building. Which is still used until the TV 24 era today. The program schedule is divided into periods from 4:00 p.m. to 9:30 p.m. The program will be presented for the first time (first-run), after which it will be re-broadcast (re-run) Later, from August 6, Asia Update started broadcasting live for the first time, namely Evening news with Patchaya Mahattanotham and Noppawan Dujsriwat as the first announcers.

Until the declaration of martial law on May 20, 2014, with subsequent orders Let Asia Update suspend broadcasting two days later (May 22), there was a continuous coup. The junta issued Order No. 15, ordering television channels to suspend broadcasting. Including Asia Update Later, the coup therefore announced to entrepreneurs Come to apply for a license to continue to operate. Democracy News Network Co., Ltd. Therefore, the new channel name was changed to Open TV ((Thai: โอเพ่นทีวี), before becoming the name of TV24 when it actually started broadcasting on September 4, the same year, started broadcasting news at noon, Newsroom at 12:00. and Mee Ketsiri Ruangkanchanset be an announcer

In December 2015, TV24 adjusted the screen aspect ratio from 4:3 which has been used since Asia Update era to 16:9 by adjusting the news text and short text submitted by viewers

TV24 closed on 30 May 2018, but continues to operate as an online newspaper and Internet TV station broadcast on YouTube with some personnel still operating but others have moved. In 2020, the online news agency broadcast on YouTube of TV 24 has changed its name back to Asia Update, while the online newspaper also continue to use the original name TV24. In 2021, the online newspaper website TV24 was renamed to Politika. It was opened as a rental studio for producing various programs, including for the Ministry of Tourism and Sports by the Sports Authority of Thailand. Rent is for use as the transmission room for T Sports TV channel (From the middle of 2019 until the station received a digital television license for public service channels in 2021, therefore moving the export room) in 2022, Asia Update's Facebook account has closed down, while the online TV station broadcasting on YouTube has changed its name to SOTV and Red TV, and later in 2023, the online TV station broadcasting on YouTube Channel Red TV has changed back to TV24 again, while SOTV has maintained this channel as a backup online television channel for TV24.

== Presenters ==
- Taswilai Tipokok (Pikky)
- Dr. Prasong Boonpong, M.D.
- Phusadee Klinthong (Ajarn Pao Singburi)
- Attachai Anantamek (since 2023)
- Associate Professor Sudsa-nguan Suthisorn (since 2023)
- Ratchanee Sriphon
- Nancy Sapsamai
- Somyot Prueksakasemsuk
- Burapha Lekluanngam
- Phichien Amnatworaprasert
- Pisut Amnatworaprasert
- Kantaphon Anuwan (currently moved to Voice TV)
- Chueak Chotchuay (currently serving as leader of the Thai Maharath Pattana Party)
- Treechada Srithada (currently moved to a straightforward television station and is a deputy spokesman for the Pheu Thai Party)
- Taweesak Heankrob
- Thanet Sriwiran
- Noppawan Dujsriwat
- Prasitchai Khambang (currently moved to Voice TV)
- Anchalee Phayakkaso
- Anurak Pumpuang
- Wisarut Bunya (currently a voice actor in the program "Sum Hua Kid" on Voice TV)
- Second Lieutenant ML Nuttakorn Devakul (currently transferred to Voice TV)
- Arunothai Siributr (currently moved to Peace TV)
- Chutima Kumar (moved to Peace TV Currently a member of the National Party)
- Aekwaranyu Amrapal (Currently serving as Spokesperson of the Bangkok Metropolitan Administration)
- Patchaya Mahathanotham (currently moved to Voice TV)
- Suparat Nakboonnam (Currently working as a farmer at Ban Rai Suparat)
- Kessiri Ruangkanchanset (Currently serving as deputy spokesperson for the Seri Ruam Thai Party)
- Nantawat Kingnok (currently an independent host)

=== Lecturer ===
- Adisorn Peangket (currently a member of the House of Representatives under the Pheu Thai Party)
- Jatuporn Phromphan (currently moved to Peace TV)
- Nattawut Saikua (Pheu Thai Party member and currently moving to online television on his own page)
- Thida Thavornseth (currently moved to host UDD news Thailand program broadcast on YouTube)
- Sunai Julapongsatorn (currently exiled from politics abroad and working on an online television channel "Sunai TV" aired on YouTube)
- Somkid Chuakhong (currently on the page of Thon Thon TV and is a member of the Pheu Thai Party)
- Lieutenant General Dr. Pongsakorn Rodchomphu (currently a pensioner)
- Nakorn Machim (currently on the Ngandrak TV page and is a member of the Pheu Thai Party)
- Arkom Suwanop (currently in the TV program, Straightforward TV, broadcast on YouTube)
- Chamnong Chaimongkol (currently in the program Thon Thon TV aired on YouTube)
- Phairoj Isseriphong (currently serving as a member of Pheu Thai Party)
- Teerarat Samretwanich (currently serving as a member of the House of Representatives of Bangkok Pheu Thai Party)
- Jirayu Huangsub (currently a member of the Pheu Thai Party)
- Karun Hosakul (currently a member of the Thai Sang Thai Party)
- Payap Panket (former member of the Thai Raksa Chart Party)
- Wiboon Chamchuen
- Leelawadee Watcharobol (currently a member of Pheu Thai Party)
- Ladawan Wongsriwong (currently a leader of Equality Party)
- Chalida Palamat (currently moving to make her own online television under the name E-Or Pakjad and holding a position as an advisor to the Win Win Foundation)
