= PPTV HD 36 =

Digital terrestrial television in Thailand

PPTV
- Country: Thailand
- Broadcast area: Southeast Asia
- Headquarters: PPTV Studio, Vibhavadi Rangsit Road, Chatuchak, Bangkok, Thailand

Programming
- Language: Thai
- Picture format: 1080i HDTV

Ownership
- Owner: Prasert Prasarttong-Osoth; Bangkok Media & Broadcasting Co., Ltd. Prasarttong-Osoth Co., Ltd.

History
- Launched: Satellite system: 1 June 2013; 13 years ago Terrestrial digital: 7 April 2014; 12 years ago Satellite and digital: 2 December 2015; 10 years ago

Links
- Website: www.pptvhd36.com

Availability

Terrestrial
- Digital terrestrial television: Channel 36 (HD) (TV 5 MUX5)

Streaming media
- PPTV: Watch live Watch sport live (All only available for Thailand)

PPTV (Thai: พีพีทีวี), also known as PPTV HD (Thai: พีพีทีวี เอชดี) and PPTV HD 36 (Thai: พีพีทีวี เอชดี 36), an acronym for Prasert Prasarttong-Osoth TeleVision) is a digital terrestrial television channel in Thailand, owned by Bangkok Media & Broadcasting Co., Ltd., a company managed by Prasarttong-Osoth, Bangkok Airways and Bangkok Hospital group owner, Prasert Prasarttong-Osoth.

For the content, PPTV used to focus on drama series from South Korea, including the programs from East Asia as the important thing. But now adjusting the format by mainly focusing on news, information and sports.

In 2020, the channel acquired the rights to broadcast Bundesliga games in Thailand. The rights will remain until 2025.

== History ==
Bangkok Media & Broadcasting Co., Ltd. was registered with a capital of 100 million baht on 27 March 2013 to operate a television channel called BMB (temporarily), later the name was changed to PPTV. as well as producing television programs for news, information and entertainment The first phase was broadcast via C-Band satellite system since 1 June, the same year, later winning the auction for digital terrestrial television spectrum in the category of national high-definition business services on Channel No. 36 under the value of 3,460 million baht on 26 December of that year and then began broadcasting through that channel since 7 April 2014.

=== Program formats ===
During the launch, PPTV divides the program into 25% news, 30% entertainment, 35% drama, 10% sports and others, distinguishing itself by outstanding program content. Focus on targeting Bangkok people and various districts nationwide combined with programs from abroad especially from South Korea together with programs from Thai content producers.

However, PPTV has positioned the market as a "Premium Mass Station", meaning it is a station that allows viewers to easily access high-quality content. In addition, PPTV also cooperates with its hospital affiliated Bangkok Dusit Medical Services both in Bangkok and in various cities such as Hua Hin, Chiang Mai, Pattaya, etc. to promote the station as a new channel for presenting program content. In addition, PPTV also uses communication in all dimensions with 3 On formats: On-Air (on television), On-Ground (on the news area) and Online (social media).

==== World Class TV (2018) ====
On 16 January 2018, after PPTV executives saw that the program schedule should be adjusted to recover revenue. In the midst of the crisis of the digital television media industry at that time PPTV has announced a new programming program under the concept of "World Class TV" by negotiating copyrights with partners both in Thailand and abroad in order to bring new quality programs to broadcast which came into force on 1 February, the same year.

=== Broadcast location ===
During the era of satellite TV broadcasting, it used the studio and broadcast at the Kasemsup Building, Vibhavadi Rangsit Road (former office of Eastman Kodak in Thailand) opposite the office building of Bangkok Airways, Then, in March 2014, PPTV opened a temporary studio at Ocean Tower 2 Building, Soi Sukhumvit 19, used along with the studio at Kasemsup Building. During the construction of the head office building in Soi Song Sa-At to be used as a filming studio, program production and broadcasting, and when the head office building at Soi Song Sa-At is completed, there was an official opening ceremony for the head office building of PPTV. In January 2015, after that, the 2 original studios moved together at the head office building on Soi Song Sa-At which used from 1 January 2015 until now.

== Presenters ==
=== Current ===
- Tivaporn Thetthit (Kratae)
- Tirayuth Tiengrachaibandit (Au)
- Sathida Pinsinchai (Aim)
- Pongsathorn Lortrakul (Arm)
- Bussaba Rongharnkaew (Neung)
- Cheunjit Charoenpongchai (Joy)
- Chatchadaporn Sriudorn (Mamaum)
- Pinyada Titikulamas (Ome)
- Veeraphol Temchotikosol (Pop)
- Suthitha Panyayong (Nina)
- Yodsapak Reungpaisarn (Pak)
- Arnad Sanitsurawong
- Ph.D Pongsathorn Jindawattana
- Weerasak Nilkrad (Add)
- Wariya Naveepanyatham (Kibtjung)
- Pattaranit Boonmee
- Lipikar Chookamol
- Sathien Viriyaparnpongsa
- Suchada Nimnul (Baifern)
- Akekaporn Srisuktaweerat (Ake)
- Pawan Siriissaranan (Puek)
- Thanyarat Thamoi (Nong)
- Pradthana Prompithak (Prad)

=== Former ===
- Banjong Cheewamongkolkarn (Jong) (now at Workpoint TV)
- Chayathip Lojanakosin (Yuu) (now at TNN16)
- Prai Thanaammaputch (Prai)
- Manat Tangsuk (Aun) (now at NBT)
- Suchada Kaewnang (now at Thai PBS)
- Jirayu Chudhabuddhi (Game) (now at JKN-CNBC and JKN18)
- Nalin Singhaputtangkul (Lin) (now at Nation TV)
- Nilaya Triworrawan (Nin)
- Charnchai Guyyasit (Koh) (now at JKN18)
- Siriboon Nattapan (Ying) (now a freelance host and the owner of Sarasilp Thaivision)
- Rawicha Tangsubut (Ritcha) (now at TNN16)
- Karnwayla Saoreun (Porpia) (now at Workpoint TV)
- Parin Jeusuwan (It) (now at NBT and TNN16)
- Elizabeth Sadler Leenanuchai (Liza) (now at TNN16)
- Prapaporn Chaowanasiri (Opal) (died on 20 September 2020)
- Parinda Kumthampinij (Toon) (now at Channel 3)
- Natchanan Peeranarong (Noon)
- Suphajon Klinsuwan (Tae)
- Pongsuk Hiranprueck (Nui) (now at Beartai)
- Suta Sudhepichetpun (Nui) (now at MCOT HD)
- Titikorn Tipmontien (Tak) (now at TNN16)
- Thongnuakao Khamphim (Kao) (now working as a freelance host)
- Pat Jungkankul (Lookbid)
- Supada Vijakachaiyapong (Jookjik)
- Masiri Klomkaew (Film) (now at Channel 9 MCOT HD)
- Kamonthon Komarathat (Earth)
- Kreangkraimas Photjanasuntorn (Kendo)
- Pattaree Patsopasakul (Bogie)
- Suthichai Yoon
- Treechada Choktanasermsakul (Numnim) (now at TNN16)
- Kornsuma Jiamsranoi (Korn)
- Nat Puttachart
- Karuna Buakamsri (Na)
- Ekkarat Takiennuch (Art) (now at SEEU)

== Identity ==
=== Logos ===
Logo from 7 April 2014 to 2026

Logo from 2 December 2015 to 2026

Logo from 2019 to 2026

=== Slogans ===
- 2013-2014: Life is Awesome
- 2014: ทุกช่วงเวลาดีดี เริ่มต้นที่นี่ (Every precious moment start here) (It was used for teasing the new look of the channel)
- 2014-2015: Turn It On / เรื่องราวดีๆ ที่มีให้คุณทุกเวลา (Good Stories That We Give for You Every Time) / Home of The Best Series & Variety Shows / เรื่องราวดีดีที่คุณต้องดู (Good Stories You Want to Watch)
- 2015-2018: ยิ่งดู ยิ่งติด (When You Watching, It Gets More Addicted) (used for main promotions) / ยิ่งดู ยิ่งได้ (When You Watching, It Gets the Prize) (used for activity campaigns)
- 2018–present: World Class TV (used for general programming)
- 2018–present: World Class Sports (used for sports programming)
- 2021–present: เรื่องข่าว เรื่องใหญ่ (The News with A Big Deal) (used for main purposes)
- 2022–present: ครบทุกข่าว เข้าใจคอกีฬา (Complete Every News, Perceive for Sport Fans) (used for other purposes)
