= Man Phatnothai =

Thai politician (1941–2026)

- มั่น พัธโนทัย
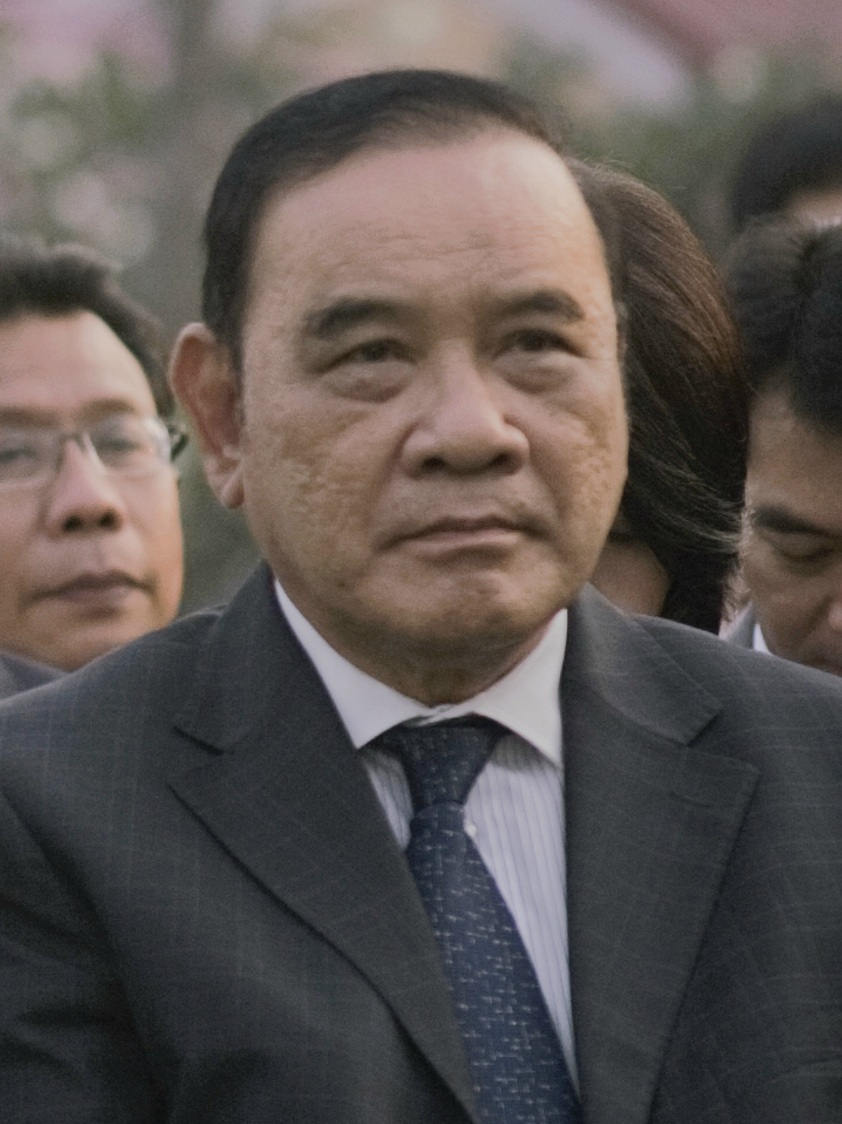
- Phatnothai in 2010

Deputy Prime Minister
- In office 2 August 2008 – 24 September 2008
- Prime Minister: Samak Sundaravej

Minister of Information and Communication Technology
- In office 6 February 2008 – 2 December 2008
- Preceded by: Kosit Panpiemras (acting)
- Succeeded by: Ranongrak Suwannachawi

Personal details
- Born: 21 January 1941 Bangkok, Thailand
- Died: 1 May 2026 (aged 85) Srinagarind Hospital ,Khon Kaen, Thailand
- Party: Chart Thai (1992–2001); Thai Rak Thai (2001–2007) People's Power (2007–2008); Puea Pandin (2008–2010); Matubhum (2010–2014); Pheu Thai (2014–2025)
- Education: Thammasat University (LLB); American University (MA); University of Maryland, College Park (MA); Kensington University (PhD)
- Occupation: Civil servant

Man Phatnothai (Thai: มั่น พัธโนทัย; 21 January 1941 – 1 May 2026) was a Thai politician. A member of multiple political parties, he served as minister of Information and Communication Technology from February to December 2008 and was Deputy Prime Minister from August to September 2008.

Phatnothai died in Mueang Khon Kaen district on 1 May 2026, at the age of 85.
