= Naewna =

- มั่นคง ตรงไป ตรงมา (Firm, Straightforward)
- Native name: แนวหน้า
- Type: Daily newspaper Online newspaper
- Format: Broadsheet
- Owner(s): Naewna Newspaper Co., Ltd.
- Founder(s): Warin Poonsiriwong; Phanit Poonsiriwong
- Founded: 22 March 1980; 46 years ago
- Language: Thai
- Headquarters: Vibhavadi Rangsit Road, Talat Bang Khen, Lak Si, Bangkok, Thailand
- Website: www.naewna.com

Naewna (Thai: แนวหน้า, lit. 'Frontline') is a Thai daily newspaper and online news platform headquartered in Bangkok, Thailand. Founded on 22 March 1980 by Warin and Phanit Poonsiriwong, the publication is owned and operated by Naewna Newspaper Co., Ltd. It has been described as having a conservative and right-wing editorial stance, regularly featuring prominent conservative political commentators and opinion columnists.

Throughout its history, Naewna has published general news, political commentary, and investigative journalism. The newspaper's editorial policy is reflected in its official motto, "Firm, Straightforward" (Thai: มั่นคง ตรงไป ตรงมา). In recent years, the publication has heavily shifted its focus toward digital media, establishing a robust online streaming and broadcasting presence under the brand Naewna Online.

== History and operations ==
Naewna was established on 22 March 1980 during a period of political transition in Thailand. Founded by Warin Poonsiriwong and Phanit Poonsiriwong, the newspaper positioned itself as a daily broadsheet offering comprehensive coverage of domestic politics, economics, and social issues. Over the decades, it has maintained a staunchly conservative editorial line, frequently providing a platform for right-leaning columnists and political figures to voice their perspectives on national developments.

In July 2016, Naewna formally resigned from the National Press Council of Thailand, citing internal disagreements regarding media ethics and regulatory approaches.

== Naewna Online ==
In response to the rapid decline of traditional print media and the expansion of digital platforms, Naewna developed its digital division under the name Naewna Online. The platform distributes news, talk shows, and political commentary through major social media channels, including Facebook, YouTube, and TikTok.

In October 2023, Naewna significantly revamped its digital operations by introducing a structured online programming schedule akin to traditional television broadcasting. The online division recruited several high-profile conservative news anchors and commentators, including Anchalee Paireerak and Boonyod Sooktinthai, to host daily news analysis and talk programs. The expansion successfully increased its digital footprint; as of late 2024, the platform's YouTube channel had amassed over 300,000 subscribers and generated more than 134 million views within a single year.

== Awards and recognition ==
Naewna has been recognized for its investigative journalism, most notably winning the prestigious Isra Amantakul Award (the highest national honor for print journalism in Thailand, often compared to the Pulitzer Prize) on two occasions:

- 1986: Awarded for its investigative exposé on illegal timber smuggling from Myanmar. According to the newspaper, its reporting on the issue contributed to public scrutiny and the resignation of then-Minister of Commerce Surat Osathanugrah.
- 1988: Awarded for its coverage of the Phra Narai Reclining Lintel from the Phanom Rung Historical Park. The lintel was returned to Thailand from the United States in 1988 following public campaigns. According to the newspaper, its reporting contributed to increased public awareness of the issue.
