= JKN Global Group =

Thai multinational conglomerate

JKN Global Group PCL
- Native name: บริษัท เจเคเอ็น โกลบอล กรุ๊ป จำกัด (มหาชน)
- Formerly: STGCP (2013–2014); JKN Living (2014); JKN Global Media (2014–2022)
- Type: Public
- Traded as: SET: JKN
- Industry: Conglomerate
- Predecessor: STG Multimedia
- Founded: May 7, 2013; 13 years ago
- Founder: Jakkaphong Jakrajutatip
- Headquarters: Samut Prakan, Thailand
- Area served: Worldwide
- Key people: Apichat Pengsritong (Chairman); Jakkaphong Jakrajutatip (CEO)
- Products: Foods; Beverages; Content distribution; Cosmetics; Health products; Home shopping; Energy drink; Entertainment; Events; Films; Mass media; Personal care; Television advertisements; Television programs
- Revenue: THB 1.804 billion (2021)
- Owners: Jakkaphong Jakrajutatip (23%
- Subsidiaries: JKN Best Life; JKN18; JKN Dramax; JKN-CNBC; JKN Hi Shopping; JKN Drink; JKN Cosmetic; JKN Global Content; JKN Legacy; JKN Miss USA; JKN Miss Teen USA; JKN Universe; JKN MNB
- Website: jknglobalgroup.com

JKN Global Group Public Company Limited (formerly known as STGCP, JKN Living and JKN Global Media) was a Thai multinational conglomerate founded by Jakkaphong Jakrajutatip. Its headquarters are in the JKN Empire building in Samut Prakan, Thailand. It comprises numerous businesses in various industries of foods, beverages, content distribution, cosmetics, health products, home shopping, energy drinks, entertainment, events, film, mass media, personal care, television advertisements, and television programs.

JKN Global Group owns the television networks – JKN18, JKN Dramax and JKN-CNBC (in collaboration with Comcast's NBCUniversal), the notable beauty pageants – Miss Universe, Miss USA, and Miss Teen USA, and the home shopping JKN Hi Shopping (in collaboration with Hyundai Home Shopping Network).

In November 2023, JKN Global Group PCL filed for bankruptcy. Facing significant financial challenges, the firm submitted a petition for "business rehabilitation" to Thailand's bankruptcy court. JKN, led by CEO Anne Jakapong Jakrajutatip, missed a crucial $12 million loan repayment deadline, prompting the bankruptcy filing. Despite this setback, JKN plans to continue operating and prioritizing the Miss Universe 2023.

In 2025 JKN was delisted from the stock exchange of Thailand for submitting false financial documents. Shareholders were allowed to temporarily trade until the final permanent delisting of the company. Anne Jakapong Jakrajutatip stepped down from her positions earlier in June 2025 citing investigation and being banned for 56 months. Creditors also allege that the sale of Miss Universe to Legacy Holding is illegal and was not approved by the Central Bankruptcy Court. The company is currently facing financial turmoil as there is a debt amounting 7 billion baht. Grant Thornton was appointed the main proprietor of the rehabilitation plan but the Court of Appeal later ruled there is no viable way of restructuring.

== Miss Universe ==
In October 2022, JKN Global Group acquired the Miss Universe Organization from IMG Worldwide for approximately US$20 million, making Jakkaphong Jakrajutatip the first woman and the first transgender woman to own the organisation. JKN held the franchise through its subsidiary JKN Legacy, Inc., a joint venture with Legacy Holding Group USA Inc.

In October 2023, JKN sold a 50% stake in the Miss Universe business to Mexican businessman Raúl Rocha Cantú's Legacy Holding Group USA Inc. for US$16 million, though the transaction was not fully disclosed to investors until January 2024. Thailand's Securities and Exchange Commission subsequently cited this non-disclosure as one of the grounds for its 2025 complaint against Jakrajutatip. Creditors in the rehabilitation proceedings alleged the sale was made without court approval and was therefore invalid.

=== 74th Miss Universe (2025) ===
The 74th Miss Universe competition was held in November 2025 at the Impact Challenger Hall in Nonthaburi, Thailand, during a period of significant legal turbulence for both co-owners of the Miss Universe Organization. Jakrajutatip did not attend the competition; an arrest warrant had been issued against her on 25 November 2025 after she failed to appear in a Bangkok court in connection with a fraud case, and her whereabouts were unknown at the time of the event. Raúl Rocha Cantú, the co-owner through Legacy Holding, was separately under investigation in Mexico in connection with alleged organised crime activity including drug and arms trafficking, though no arrest warrant had been issued against him at the time of the competition.

The competition was marked by a series of controversies. During the preliminary competition on 19 November 2025, Gabrielle Henry, Miss Universe Jamaica 2025 and an ophthalmology resident at the University Hospital of the West Indies, fell through an unguarded opening in the stage floor during the evening gown round at the Impact Challenger Hall and was hospitalised in intensive care in Bangkok. On 8 December 2025, the Miss Universe Organization and the Henry family issued a joint statement confirming that Henry had sustained an intracranial haemorrhage with loss of consciousness, a fracture, a collapsed lung, and facial lacerations, and that the Miss Universe Organization had assumed full and immediate responsibility for the incident. Separately, Miss Universe Thailand national director Nawat Itsaragrisil publicly reprimanded Miss Universe Mexico Fátima Bosch during a pre-competition ceremony, prompting a walkout by multiple contestants and a formal rebuke from the Miss Universe Organization's president. Two judges also withdrew from the competition, with one publicly alleging irregularities in the selection process. Fátima Bosch of Mexico was crowned Miss Universe 2025 on 21 November 2025.

== Major shareholders ==
As of March 25, 2022

Rank	Major Shareholders	No. of Shares	% of Issued Capital
1	Jakkaphong Jakrajutatip	322,923,173	53.16
2	Chalerm Harnphanich	24,000,000	3.95
3	Pimauma Jakrajutatip	23,358,150	3.84
4	BNP Paribas Singapore.	20,000,000	3.29
5	Chonnipa Lamgorn	6,200,250	1.02
6	Thai NVDR Company Limited.	4,478,291	0.74
7	Wantanee Rujirawannakorn	3,582,000	0.59
8	Aongart Wornwitlikhit	3,450,000	0.57
9	Viboon Wadcharasurang	2,649,500	0.44
10	Chanon Vanichvarakij	2,325,000	0.38

== Subsidiary company ==
Company	Division	Fields of activity	Headquarters	Ref.
JKN Best Life, Co., Ltd.	JKN Hi Shopping, Co., Ltd.; Quatro P, Co., Ltd.	Consumer goods, cosmetics, health products, home shopping (JKN Hi Shopping), and television network (JKN18 and JKN-CNBC)	Samut Prakan, Thailand	
JKN Global Content, Pte., Ltd.	—N/a	Content distribution (sale and purchase of copyrighted contents overseas)	Celic Street, Singapore	
JKN Legacy, Inc. (50%, joint venture with Legacy Holding Group USA Inc.)	JKN Universe, LLC.; JKN Universe FranchCo, LLC.; MUO Productions, LLC.; Miss USA BR Productions, LLC.; Miss USA Productions OH, LLC.	Beauty pageants and television program (Miss Universe, Miss USA and Miss Teen USA)	New York City, United States (MUO United States)	

== Channel 18 ==
Channel 18
- Country: Thailand
- Broadcast area: Thailand; Southeast Asia (Satellites Only)
- Headquarters: 818 Soi Bearing 19 Moo 2, Samrong Nuea Subdistrict, Mueang Samut Prakan District, Samut Prakan, Thailand

Programming
- Languages: Thai; Hindi (Series); English (Documentary)
- Picture format: 576i SDTV

Ownership
- Owner: JKN Best Life Co., Ltd. (JKN Global Group)
- Parent: Daily News (2012-2021); JKN Global Group (2021-2026)
- Sister channels: JKN-CNBC; JKN Dramax

History
- Launched: Satellite system: 15 February 2012; 14 years ago Terrestrial digital: 1 April 2014; 12 years ago Satellite and digital: 2 December 2015; 10 years ago
- Closed: 26 January 2026; 9 months ago
- Former names: Daily News TV (2012–2014); New TV (2014–2017); New 18 (2017–2021); JKN18 (2021-2025)

Links
- Website: www.jknglobalgroup.com/jkn18/

Availability

Terrestrial
- Digital: Channel 18 (SDTV) (Thai PBS - MUX4) in Bangkok

Streaming media
- TrueID: Watch live

Channel 18 (Thai: ช่อง 18) was a Thai digital terrestrial television channel operated by JKN Best Life Co., Ltd., a subsidiary of JKN Global Group.

Formerly known as Daily News TV (Thai: เดลินิวส์ทีวี), it was a satellite television station affiliated with the Daily News newspaper before changing the name to New TV (Thai: นิวทีวี) and New 18 (Thai: นิว 18) after transitioning to digital TV and focus on presenting various documentaries, especially the Samrujlok documentaries by Next Step Co., Ltd., and news programs from Daily News. But since 8 March 2021, JKN has taken control of the 24-hour broadcast and the news programs that were originally broadcast have been moved to all online platforms and on 9 April, JKN had acquired New 18, then revised the channel's program schedule. Before it was starting to aired its programming in a new schedule on 5 May and changing the name of the station to JKN18 on 26 May.

On September 9, 2023, there was news that TOP News had negotiated with Jakkaphong Jakrajutatip, chief executive officer and president of JKN Global Group to acquire JKN18, which is the same television station that used to have a rumor that a group of TOP News personnel will move to work at the end of 2020 by acquiring the business for a value of approximately 500,000,000 baht, which if successful will be called TOP News 18 But Jakkaphong denied through a notification to the Stock Exchange of Thailand on September 11 that it was only an agreement to produce joint news programs between JKN18 and TOP News, in which that TOP News programs will be appeared on JKN18, replacing the main news programs that self-produced by the channel itself, starting on September 18 of that year. TOP News will also ceased broadcasting on cable and satellite on September 30, 2023 to pave way for the full transition of the channel into the digital TV era, which will be broadcast its news programs on JKN18 only.

After the process was completed, TOP News announced that it would end its satellite broadcasting and would move to broadcast on digital TV channel 18 from 18 September onwards and JKN18 has announced the dissolve of the former news staff including all JKN-CNBC news departments in order to clear the time slot for TOP News, while broadcasting via cable and satellite TV, which is TOP News' original channel, the broadcasting will continue as normal. But it will be a parallel broadcast from JKN18 only, and in some programs which are originally under the copyright of JKN, there will be no broadcasting on the cable and satellite channel. During its aforementioned time, the station will open an informercial program instead.

=== Former Presenters ===
- Chanchai Kayasith (now at RTA 5)
- Nath Boonyasiriyanon
- Napat Theeraditthakul (now at 9MCOT HD)
- Akkarapol Thongtaradol
- Romklao Amatayakul
- Suchathip Jirayunont (now at RTA 5)
- Pichapat Arjpongsa
- Kanoknuan Jaratkunnahong (now at NBT)
- Rungnapha Suhongsa
- Anchalee Paireerak (now at Naewna)
- Samran Rodpetch
- Udon Saengarun (now an executive head of news department of the channel)
- Sonthiyan Chuenruthainaitham
- Samran Rodpetch
- Kornsuda Wiratat
- Kanok Ratwongsakul
- Thira Thanpaiboon
- Santisuk Marongsri
- Narong Suthirak
- Sathaporn Kuasakul
- Nititar Chaopayak
- Ubolrat Thaonoi
- Worathep Suwatthanaphim
- Wittayen Muttara
- Takerng Somsap
- Rungratree Suhongsa
- Wootthinan Nahim
- Chanutra Petchmoon
- Jarunee Suksawat
- Araya Sarikakuti
- Sirawit Chaikasem
- Phonsawan Jarupan
- Pracha Harirakakphithak
- Amorn Taeudomkul
- Chayathorn Thanaworachet
- Chiratwat Siributr
- Athitchan Khuharuengrong
- Salinna Phuiam
- Tharawut Ritthiaksorn
- Padungsin Srichaiyo
- Laksika Paethong
- Supornthip Thepchanta
- Kantaphon Bungwai
- Sitsiya Wisutprani
- Boonradom Jitdon
- Sayan Klomsakorn
- Witthayen Muttamara

== JKN-CNBC ==
JKN-CNBC
- Country: Thailand
- Broadcast area: Nationwide
- Network: CNBC
- Headquarters: 818 Soi Bearing 19 Moo 2, Samrong Nuea Subdistrict, Mueang Samut Prakan District, Samut Prakan, Thailand

Programming
- Language: Thai
- Picture format: 1080i HDTV 16:9

Ownership
- Owner: JKN Best Life Co., Ltd. (JKN Global Group with license from NBCUniversal International Networks)
- Sister channels: JKN18; JKN Dramax

History
- Launched: 6 January 2020; 6 years ago (original); 1 June 2022; 4 years ago (Facebook transmission); 15 September 2022; 4 years ago (relaunch)
- Closed: 30 September 2020; 6 years ago (original); 15 September 2023; 3 years ago (relaunch)

Links
- Website: www.jkn-cnbc.com

Availability

Streaming media
- Official website: Watch live

JKN-CNBC (Thai: เจเคเอ็น-ซีเอ็นบีซี) was a short-lived online business news television channel owned by JKN Best Life Co., Ltd., a subsidiary of JKN Global Group, in collaboration with Comcast's NBCUniversal. It focused on business news programs from CNBC that is locally produced, such as Squawk Box, Power Lunch, Halftime Report, Worldwide Exchange and Capital Connection.

=== History ===
In November 2016, JKN News Co., Ltd., a subsidiary of JKN Global Media (now JKN Global Group), has acquired the rights from NBCUniversal to produce programs under CNBC's own brand. Under the brand "JKN-CNBC", the first program produced for broadcast was "First Class Thailand by JKN-CNBC" broadcast on Channel 3 SD from 1 June 2018 until 2019.

On 1 July 2019, JKN-CNBC began broadcasting CNBC's news programs in Thai for the first time on GMM 25, but only aired for 2–3 months, the channel had to withdraw all programs because the audience base is not suitable for the channel. Starting in September, CNBC's noon and evening news were adapted into JKN News' general news program and in October, the channel has stopped broadcasting the noon news and evening news produced by JKN News by allowing the news team of GMM 25 to resume producing the noon and evening news instead by modifying CNBC's morning news to be a general news program of JKN News instead but still producing news under the brand "JKN-CNBC" on other digital television channels and JKN-CNBC's Facebook page, as well as international news sections on GMM 25's noon news and evening news.

On 6 January 2020, JKN News Co., Ltd. officially opened the JKN-CNBC channel under the slogan "Your new economic news channel" by trial broadcasting documentaries, news programs and product sales programs throughout 24 hours via website www.jkncnbc.com, it is the first channel by bringing CNBC news programs that have been discontinued from GMM 25, including international news broadcasting during the noon and evening news of GMM 25, to be broadcast on JKN-CNBC instead.

JKN-CNBC's online television station ceased broadcasting on 30 September 2020. CNBC's news programs in Thai have moved to broadcast on JKN TV and JKN18 respectively. The station returned to open again under the slogan "Capitalize on it. Invest for a wealthy life", with Ratchaphol Lhaowanich as the editor-in-chief. It started broadcasting live via the JKN-CNBC Facebook page from 1 June 2022 and started broadcasting on AIS Play on 15 September 2022. JKN-CNBC's online television station ceased broadcasting again on 15 September 2023 alongside the closing of JKN18's news department, due to JKN18 already did a partnership with TOP News, starting on 18 September of that year.

=== Former programming ===
- Squawk Box
- Power Lunch
- Halftime Report
- Street Signs
- Worldwide Exchange
- Capital Connection
- The CNBC Conversation
- Tech Check
- Trading Nation
- JKN-CNBC Around the World (later known as Rob Lok Kub JKN-CNBC)
- The Exchange
- Managing Thailand
- First Class Thailand by JKN-CNBC
- The News (previously known as The News with Anne JKN and also known as Pleuk Than Lok)

=== Last Presenters Before Closing the Channel ===
- Ratchaphol Lhaowanich
- Warinmat Panyadee
- Chanida Prasomsuk
- Nisarat Rattanasaksopana
- Jirayu Chudhabuddhi

== JKN Dramax ==
JKN Dramax
- Country: Thailand
- Broadcast area: Thailand
- Headquarters: 818 Soi Bearing 19 Moo 2, Samrong Nuea Subdistrict, Mueang Samut Prakan District, Samut Prakan, Thailand

Programming
- Language: Thai
- Picture format: 576i SDTV

Ownership
- Owner: JKN Best Life Co., Ltd. (JKN Global Group)
- Parent: Intouch Holdings (2016-2021); JKN Global Group (2021-present)
- Sister channels: JKN18; JKN-CNBC

History
- Launched: 6 January 2016; 10 years ago (as HIGH Shopping); 21 September 2021; 5 years ago (as JKN Hi Shopping); 1 August 2023; 3 years ago (as JKN Dramax)
- Former names: HIGH Shopping (2016-2021); JKN Hi Shopping (2021-2023)

Links
- Website: www.jkn-hishopping.com

Availability

Streaming media
- JKN Hi Shopping: Watch live

JKN Dramax (Thai: เจเคเอ็นดราแม็กซ์) (formerly known as HIGH Shopping (Thai: ไฮช็อปปิ้ง) and JKN Hi Shopping (Thai: เจเคเอ็นไฮช็อปปิ้ง)) is a drama-focused television channel owned by JKN Best Life Co., Ltd., a subsidiary of JKN Global Group. The channel focused on drama series from Thailand, India and the Philippines as well as home shopping infomercials from JKN Hi Shopping (in collaboration with Hyundai Home Shopping Network). It was launched on January 6, 2016 as HIGH Shopping, it was originally a home shopping channel from its inception until July 2023 when it was transform into a drama-focused channel. The channel was formerly owned by Intouch Holdings' Intouch Media through HIGH Shopping Co., Ltd. before it was acquired 51% of the company and its channel and changed its name of the company and its channel to JKN Hi Shopping on September 21, 2021. It was later changed its name to JKN Dramax on August 1, 2023. The name of the channel has been recently reused due to its former channel known as JKN TV has previously used the JKN Dramax name that replacing the JKN name at the time from 11 July 2016 until 30 September 2020. It also has 2 OTT channels previously being aired called JKN Namaste (in collaboration with The Walt Disney Company's Fox Networks Group) and JKN Zee Magic (in collaboration with Zee Entertainment Enterprises), respectively.
