= Bluesky Channel =

Thai-Tai Channel
- Country: Thailand
- Broadcast area: Thailand
- Headquarters: 8th Floor, Bangkok Tower, 2170 New Petchburi Road, Bang Kapi Subdistrict, Huay Kwang District, Bangkok, Thailand

Programming
- Language: Thai
- Picture format: 576i SDTV

Ownership
- Owner: Bluesky Channel Co., Ltd.

History
- Launched: 1 November 2011; 14 years ago
- Former names: Bluesky Channel (2012–2014); Fahwonmai (2014–2023)

Links
- Website: www.thai-tai.tv

Thai-Tai Channel (Thai: ไทยไทแชนแนล), formerly known as Bluesky Channel and Fahwonmai (ฟ้าวันใหม่), is a Thai online news television channel. In the past it was a cable and satellite news TV channel. It was owned by Bluesky Channel Co., Ltd. The channel officially started broadcasting on November 1, 2011, at 1:00 PM.

The station rose to prominence as Blusky, a partisan channel first associated with the Democrat Party, then with the anti-Thaksin protest group known as the People's Democratic Reform Committee, which was the main instigator of the 2013–2014 Thai political crisis. It gained most of the former viewership of ASTV, which had stopped broadcasting in 2011.

== Presenters ==
- Jittakorn Busaba
- Naruemon Pukyom
- Pakpoom Temasiri
- Nantiya Jitasopawadee
- Kritsanapong Kiattisak
