= Kanok Ratwongsakul =

Thai journalist

- กนก รัตน์วงศ์สกุล
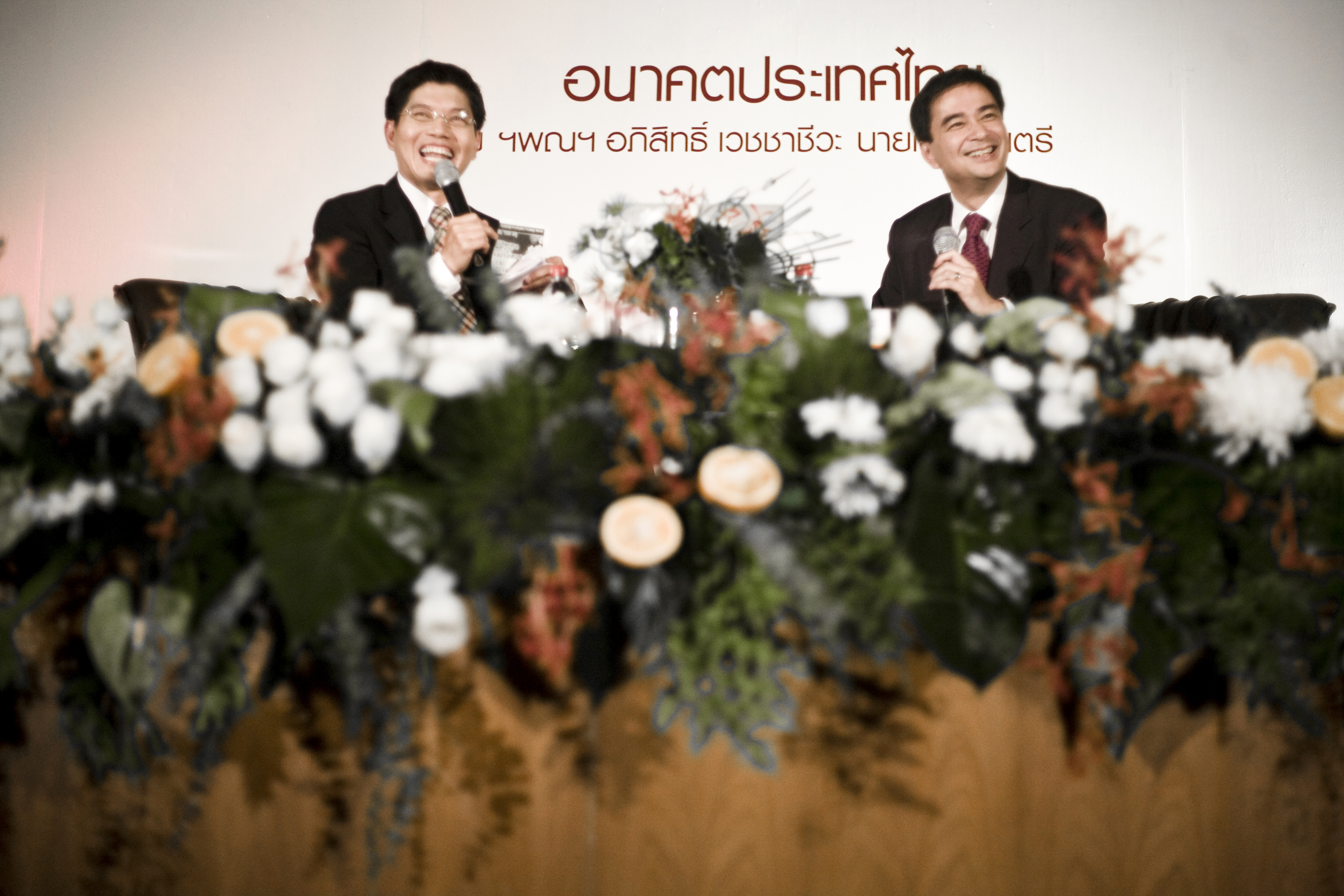
- Ratwongsakul (left) with Abhisit Vejjajiva (Thai Prime Minister at that time) in 2009.
- Born: November 4, 1963 (age 61); Pom Prap Sattru Phai, Bangkok, Thailand
- Other names: Jing (จิ้ง)
- Education: Wat Rangbua School
- Alma mater: Thammasat University
- Occupation: Journalist
- Known for: Collaboration with: Sorayuth Suthassanachinda; Theera Thanyapaiboon; Suthichai Yoon; Nantakwang Sirasoontorn
- Television: Kom Chad Luek; Keb Tok Jak Nation; Khui Kui Khao; Khuan Guan Khao; Jamuk Mod; Khor Khao; Lao Hai Roo Reung; Nation Khao Khon Keela Khem; Ying Tok Kanok Chad; Chao Khao Khon Khon Khao Chao; Talkative; Line Kanok; Chao Khao Khem; Lao Khao Khon; Na Krub; Line Kanok Yok Siam
- Spouse: Lakkana Ratwongsakul (m. 2000)

Kanok Ratwongsakul (Thai: กนก รัตน์วงศ์สกุล; nickname: Jing–จิ้ง) is well-known Thai journalist, now he served as the news anchor of TOP News, which he also served as one of its shareholders of TOP News Digital Media Co., Ltd. alongside his spouse Lakkana Ratwongsakul and the main owner, Sonthiyan Chuenruthainaitham. He previously served as Senior Vice President of the Nation Group.

== Biography ==
Ratwongsakul was born on November 4, 1963, in a Thai-Chinese poor family in Bangkok's Yotse neighbourhood. He attended elementary at Wat Phra Phiren School in the Khlong Thom neighbourhood. Later on, his family moved to the Thonburi's Samre, due to being evicted from the area. He graduated from Wat Rangbua School in Phasi Charoen, and graduated with a Bachelor of Communication Arts from Thammasat University.

He started working as a freelance radio host. Later on, he worked as a radio host with Suthichai Yoon, founder of NMG, including working as a TV host in pair with Sorayuth Suthassanachinda between 2000–03. He left Nation TV in 2020 alongside Sonthiyan Chuenruthainaitham and other anchors from the channel due to its hashtag #BanNationSponsors went viral and the reform of Nation Group. Currently, he is the main news anchor of TOP News along with Theera Thanyapaiboon.

== Personal life ==
He liked to cut news stories in newspapers and collect them since childhood, and love to watch movies. He is currently married but has no children.

For football, Ratwongsakul is a supporter of Everton FC, Bayern Munich and the Germany national football team.
