= Thai Parliament Television =

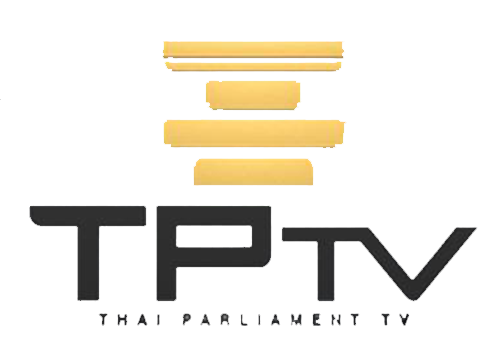
- Country: Thailand
- Broadcast area: Thailand; Southeast Asia (Satellites Only)
- Headquarters: Sappaya-Sapasathan; Dusit, Bangkok, Thailand

Programming
- Language: Thai
- Picture format: 576i SDTV

Ownership
- Owner: National Assembly of Thailand

History
- Launched: Satellite system: 12 August 2006; 19 years ago Terrestrial digital: 23 July 2015; 10 years ago Satellite and digital: 2 December 2015; 10 years ago

Links
- Website: www.tpchannel.org

Availability

Terrestrial
- Digital: Channel 10 (SDTV) on UHF Channel 40 (MCOT - MUX3) in Bangkok

Thai Parliament Television (Thai: สถานีวิทยุโทรทัศน์รัฐสภา) is a Thai television channel that broadcasts live sessions of National Assembly of Thailand such as House of Representatives and Senate and information of parliamentary to people. Outside the parliamentary coverage including non-sitting hours, TPTV air Educational and Edutainment program.

TPTV also shares airtime on NBT since 2002-2003 on Weekday Mornings and Selected Sessions of the Parliament. TPTV also simulcast on most television channels and News Website and social media owned by news media in Thailand during most important sessions.

TPTV was launched on 12 August 2006 in satellite platform. TPTV started broadcasting in Digital television on MCOT MUX on 21 July 2015.

== Programming ==
=== News and Public Affairs ===
- Parliament Newsroom
- Inside The Parliament (Simulcast on NBT)
- People's Parliament (Simulcast on NBT)
- Hotline Parliament
- Zoom In

== Presenters ==
- Kaveepan Montreewong
- Wattana Klaikaew
- Pruit Prompong
- Wipha Rakthai
- Kanphot Thitiwanichkul
- Jaruwat Boonprasert
- Kitti Seriprayoon
- Nattaphatphon Chutipanich
- Thiraphong Thanan
- Saranthon Kaewwiangchai
- Raweephat Jirasakwatana
