= ASTV (Thailand) =

Thai satellite television station

ASTV (Asia Satellite TV) was a Thai satellite television station and network operating from 2004 to 2014, after which it rebranded as News1. Originally operating under Manager Media Group (owner of the Manager Daily newspaper), the station was established by Manager founder Sondhi Limthongkul, a prominent critic of Prime Minister Thaksin Shinawatra, and operated as an ultra-partisan political news channel promoting an anti-Thaksin viewpoint. It played a role in popularizing massive protests by the Sondhi-led group the People's Alliance for Democracy, which led to political crises that helped bring down Thaksin-aligned governments in 2006 and 2008.

ASTV introduced the partisan television format to Thai politics, and inspired the opposing channels Asia Update and Voice TV, which catered to the Red Shirts. Facing financial difficulties, ASTV suspended satellite operations in 2011, and most of its viewership was absorbed by Bluesky Channel. The station has since resumed broadcasting, though its political influence has largely faded.
