= Thairath =

Thai newspaper

- Thairath front page, 1 March 2012, on which include the following reports: The King and Queen of Thailand received the Duke of York; Worachet Phakhirat, associate professor of the Faculty of Law, Thammasat University, was attacked inside the Faculty by two men disagreeing with Phakhirat's proposal to amend the Criminal Code, section 112, or the lese majeste law; The Pheu Thai Party is to amend the Constitution by dissolving the Administrative Courts and other independent agencies, including the Election Commission; Lana O'Connell, Australian swimsuit model, was crashed to death and found to have failed to wear a helmet.
- Type: Daily newspaper
- Format: Broadsheet
- Founder: Kampol Wacharapol
- Founded: 5 January 1950 as The Weekly Pictorial; 25 December 1962; 63 years ago as Thai Rath
- Language: Thai
- Headquarters: Bangkok, Thailand
- Circulation: 1,000,000
- ISSN: 1686-4921
- OCLC number: 153879561
- Website: www.thairath.co.th

Thairath (Thai: ไทยรัฐ, lit. 'Thai State') is a daily newspaper in Thai published in Bangkok and distributed nationwide. The paper is a broadsheet published with two sections. The first section is devoted to news. Although the news section is best known for its sensationalist coverage of crime and accidents, it also includes stories on Thai politics, economy, and society. The second section features coverage of sport and entertainment. Thairath is the best-selling newspaper in Thailand, claiming a circulation in excess of 1 million copies daily. It also became the oldest Thai-language newspaper still in print, after Siam Rath ceased the publication of its hardcopy edition in August 2025.

== History ==
Thairath was founded on 25 December 1962 by Kampol Wacharapol, who had started two other newspapers, Khaopap Raiwan (Thai: ข่าวภาพรายวัน, lit. The Weekly Pictorial), which was published between 1950 and 1958, when the newspaper was shut down by the government, and Siang Ang Thong (Thai: เสียงอ่างทอง, lit. Ang Thong Voice) which he rented from Laor Kerdkaew after Khaopap Raiwan's shutdown and was published between 1 May 1959 and 25 December 1962.

Thairath has been the largest-selling Thai newspaper for decades.

== Political stance ==
The newspaper's political page had supported Prime Minister Thaksin Shinawatra and the policies of his Thai Rak Thai Party since he came to power in 2001. Towards the end of 2005, however, the page shifted its editorial stance and started to air views more sceptical of the government. In the aftermath of the April 2006 general election, Thairath welcomed Thaksin's resignation announcement, arguing in an editorial that Thaksin should acknowledge that "The election result showed that the anti-Thaksin feeling had actually spread out among city residents who had a democratic mind and opposed all types of (alleged) corruption".

== Controversies ==
Thairath is the only Thai newspaper that published a photo of David Carradine's body after his death at Bangkok in 2009. A member of Carradine's family stated that the family was "profoundly disturbed" by the incident, and threatened legal action against further distribution of the image.

On 9 August 2020, Thairath published a headline that called the Philippines, the country from which 165 Filipino teachers who arrived in Thailand on 8 August came from, as the "land of COVID-19". The headline caused disappointment from some Filipinos, who found the headline discriminatory and xenophobic. Thai journalist Erich Parpart apologized on Facebook for "the idiocracy of [Thailand's] main tabloid". In response, the Philippine Embassy in Thailand sent a letter to Thairath regarding the said headline. In the letter, it said that "the characterization is inappropriate, insensitive, and unhelpful", and that the Filipino teachers in question and other Filipinos who will return to Thailand are following Thai government protocols regarding COVID-19.
