= True4U =

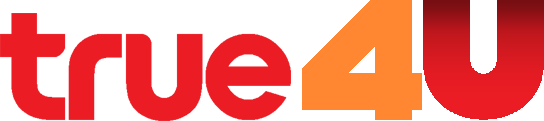
- Country: Thailand
- Broadcast area: Southeast Asia
- Headquarters: Tipco Tower, Phaya Thai, Bangkok, Thailand

Programming
- Language: Thai
- Picture format: 576i (16:9 SDTV)

Ownership
- Owner: True4U Station Co., Ltd. (a unit of TrueVisions, a subsidiary of True Corporation, part of the Charoen Pokphand Group and Telenor)

History
- Launched: Satellite system: 16 July 2012; 13 years ago Terrestrial digital: 22 April 2014; 12 years ago Satellite and digital: 2 December 2015; 10 years ago
- Former names: Shopping@Home; SMEs Shop Channel; Shopping Network; True 10

Links
- Website: true4u.truelife.com

Availability

Terrestrial
- Digital: Channel 24 (SDTV) (TV5 MUX2) on UHF

True4U is a Thai digital terrestrial television channel owned by True4U Station Company Limited, a unit of TrueVisions, a subsidiary of True Corporation, part of the Charoen Pokphand Group and Telenor. It broadcasts news, entertainment and sport programs. True4U is broadcasting on Thailand digital television platform on channel 24.

== History ==
True4U originally launched in 1998 as Shopping@Home, a shopping television channel owned by UBC and broadcast on its own platform. In 2005, the Office of Small and Medium Enterprises Promotion, a department of Ministry of Industry hired UBC to produce their own channel and rename the channel to SMEs Shop Channel. In 2009, TV Direct Co., Ltd., a Thai shopping television network, rented the channel and renamed to Shopping Network.

In 2012, the platform operator, TrueVisions relaunched the channel renaming it as "True 10" broadcasting on various platforms. True 10 aired entertainment, news and sport programs from TrueVisions and self-produced.

In December 2013, True DTT Company Limited won a digital terrestrial television license to broadcast in standard definition.

On 31 March 2014, True 10 was closed to prepare the channel to broadcast as a digital television.

True4U tested broadcast on digital television platform in April 2014 and officially launched on 22 April 2014.

On 1 January 2017, The high-definition simulcast of True4U on TrueVisions has been terminated.
