= Jakkaphong Jakrajutatip =

Thai executive (born 1979)

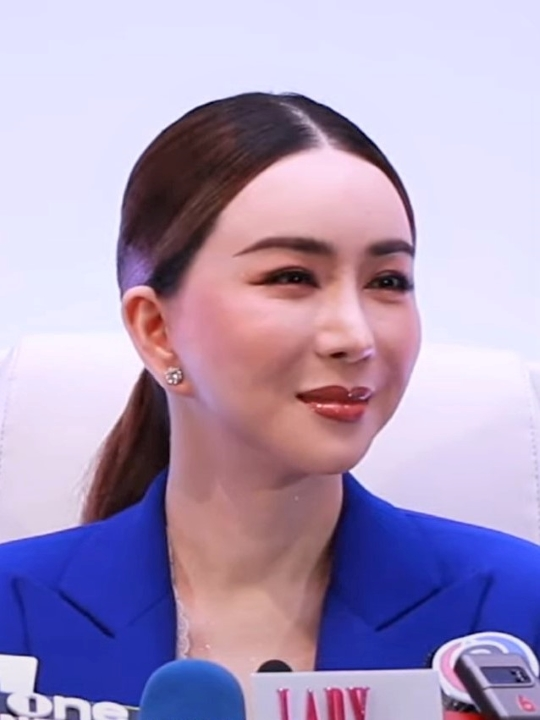
- Jakrajutatip in 2022
- Born: 17 February 1979 (age 47); Bangkok, Thailand
- Education: Bond University; Chulalongkorn University
- Occupation: Businesswoman
- Title: CEO of JKN Global Group (since May 2018); Proprietor of the Miss Universe Organization, Miss USA, and Miss Teen USA beauty pageants (since October 2022)
- Children: 2

Jakkaphong Jakrajutatip (Thai: จักรพงษ์ จักราจุฑาธิบดิ์; born 17 February 1979), also known as Anne Jakrajutatip, sometimes informally stylized as Anne JKN, is a Thai businesswoman and television host, along with being the founder and current CEO of JKN Global Group.

A media entrepreneur and digital content distributor in Thailand, Jakrajutatip is the current owner of the Miss Universe, Miss USA, and Miss Teen USA beauty pageant organizations. Jakrajutatip became the first trans woman who fully owned these organizations in their history. According to Forbes, she is the third richest transgender person in the world, with an estimated net worth of US$210 million (6.37 billion baht) in 2020.

== Early life ==
Jakkaphong Jakrajutatip was born into a Thai Chinese family in Bangkok. She is the eldest child of Ashira Suthisataporn and Ampai Jakrajutatip. She has two siblings. During an interview on "The Journal" podcast, Jakrajutatip mentioned that she knew she was "trapped in the wrong body" since the age of five. Her parents ran a video rental store, which would later become ST Grand, and encouraged her to learn English. She speaks both English and Thai.

During her early years, she attended Assumption College, Bangkok. She ran her family's video distribution and production company for her parents and invested in many media licenses and real estate.

She went abroad to study international relations at Bond University in Queensland, Australia. She later earned a certificate of Real Estate Development from Chulalongkorn University and completed a Director Accreditation Program from the Thai Institute of Directors Association.

== Career ==
Jakrajutatip's career began to soar while she was working at her parents' video rental shop. The turning point came when she discovered the BBC documentary Walking With Dinosaurs and reached out to the BBC, expressing interest in distributing the series in Thailand. This venture proved highly successful, resulting in the sale of one million copies. Commencing with the distribution of documentaries, she gradually broadened her scope to encompass content from South Korea, Japan, and Hollywood. She notably pioneered the introduction of Indian TV shows to Thai audiences, a contribution that led to her earning the moniker 'Queen of Indian Content'.

Subsequently, she founded JKN Global Media in 2013. Jakrajutatip successfully listed her business, JKN Global Media, on the Market for Alternative Investment in 2017 and assumed the role of Chief Executive Officer in 2018. In 2019, Jakrajutatip was the first Thai and the first transgender woman to receive the Asia Media Woman of the Year award at the Content Asia Summit in Singapore. She was named one of the "Women of the Year 2022" by the Bangkok Post.

In 2021, she elevated her business listing to the main board of the Stock Exchange of Thailand (SET). She continued her ambitious ventures in the media industry by investing 1.1 billion baht to acquire the TV channel JKN18 in April 2021. She then ventured into the e-commerce business, buying a stake in an online shopping company in September 2021.

She has also been outspoken about her experiences as a transgender woman and is the founder and director of the Life Inspired for Transsexual Foundation, a charity organization that advocates for transgender rights in Thailand.

In October 2022, she purchased the Miss Universe, Miss USA, and Miss Teen USA beauty pageants for $20 million USD, citing the desire to expand the cause of women empowerment among those who are disenfranchised by poverty and gender discrimination. This acquisition marked her as the first woman to own the organization since its inception in 1952.

As of 23 March 2023, her shareholding in the JKN Group has decreased to 24.55%, down from a previous level of over 50%. Despite this decrease, she retains the status of the largest shareholder, as reported on the SET website. She filed for bankruptcy for the JKN Global Group in November 2023.

== Personal life ==
Jakrajutatip is a transgender woman. She has two children. She currently lives in Bangkok, Thailand.

=== Arrest warrant ===
In November 2025, a warrant of arrest was filed against Jakrajutatip. According to the Bangkok South District Court, Jakrajutatip and her company JKN Global Group were sued for allegedly defrauding an investor in 2023, which caused him to lose 30 million baht ($930,362). Jakrajutatip was charged with fraud then was released on bail in 2023 but failed to appear for a court hearing.
