= RTA5 =

Thai television network

- Country: Thailand
- Broadcast area: Southeast Asia
- Headquarters: Phaya Thai, Bangkok, Thailand

Programming
- Languages: Thai; English
- Picture format: 1080i HDTV

Ownership
- Owner: Royal Thai Army
- Sister channels: Channel 7 (1967-2018)

History
- Launched: 25 January 1958; 68 years ago
- Former names: HSA-TV Channel 7 (1958-1974)

Links
- Website: www.thaitv5hd.com

Availability

Terrestrial
- Digital: Channel 5 (HD) (TV5 MUX2)

RTA5 or RTA5 HD (Full Name : Royal Thai Army Radio and Television Station; also known as Channel 5 or Channel 5 HD) is a Thai free-to-air public television network owned by the Royal Thai Army, launched on 25 January 1958.

== History ==
Launched on 25 January 1958, as HSA-TV Channel 7, it was led by Tawon Chueyprasit, who was a colonel at the Signals Corps, but managed the station in the afternoon. This television station transitioned from broadcasting in black-and-white to a color television as Channel 5 in 1974 dubbing themselves "RTA5". The Army set up the station in an attempt to destabilize the ruling Phibul government. RTA5 is the second oldest television station in Thailand, owned and operated by the Royal Thai Army, and as such features, among others, programming devoted to the Royal Thai Armed Forces.

RTA5 completely ceased its analog broadcast on 21 June 2018 at 9:30am as part of its digital switchover. It was initially scheduled for 16 June but was supposed to be postponed to the end of the 2018 FIFA World Cup.

On 25 November 2021, RTA5 moved its LCN from 1 to 5.

== News Anchors ==
=== Current ===
- Chonrasamee Ngathaweesuk
- Suchathip Munsinthorn
- Panupong Kanathikon
- Thananya Pipitwanichkan
- Salilana Phuiam
- Yongyuth Mailarp
- Saisawan Khayanying
- Chib Jitniyom
- Chotiros Somboon
- Napaporn Changkhon
- Kannanat Pornnipatkul
- Assadaporn Khieworn
- Apinya Khaosabai
- Pajaree Suansinlaphong
- Choengchai Hwangoun
- Natsarut Askpornthongsut
- Priya Netwichian
- Paveena Sribuachom
- Suruj Tipakornsaenee

=== Former ===
- Sunida Swatdiponphallop (now at TNN16)
- Suhatcha Swatdiponphallop (now at TNN16)
- Polawat Pupipat (now at TNN16)
- Amphika Chuanpreecha (now at NBT)
- Manut Tangsuk (now at NBT)

== See also ==
- Television in Thailand
