= National Broadcasting Services of Thailand =

Public television network in Thailand

National Broadcasting Services of Thailand สถานีโทรทัศน์แห่งประเทศไทย
- Logo used since 1 January 2025
- Country: Thailand
- Headquarters: Din Daeng, Bangkok, Thailand

Programming
- Languages: Thai (main); English (for Newsline, Thailand Today and The Fireside)
- Picture format: 1080i50 HDTV

Ownership
- Owner: Public Relations Department of the Office of the Prime Minister
- Sister channels: NBT 2HD; NBT Regional TV (DTT Channel 11); NBT World

History
- Launched: Radio Thailand established: 25 February 1930; 96 years ago Public Relations Department established: 3 May 1933; 93 years ago Radio Thailand World Service established: 20 October 1938; 88 years ago NBT TV first broadcast: 1 October 1985; 41 years ago NBT TV established: 11 July 1988; 38 years ago
- Former names: TVT11 (1985–2008)

Links
- Website: nbt2hd.prd.go.th (Thai) nbtcentral.com (Central Regional) nbtchiangmai.prd.go.th (Northern Regional) nbtkhonkaen.prd.go.th (Northeastern Regional) nbtsuratthani.prd.go.th (Southern Regional)

Availability

Terrestrial
- Digital: Channel 2 (HD) (PRD - MUX1)

National Broadcasting Services of Thailand (Thai: สถานีโทรทัศน์แห่งประเทศไทย, romanized: Sathani Thorathat Haeng Prathet Thai) (NBT) is the public broadcasting arm of the Government Public Relations Department (PRD), a division of the Thai Government. It operates comprehensive media services comprising radio, public television networks (terrestrial and satellite), online services and social media.

== Terrestrial stations ==
=== Radio stations ===
Radio Thailand is the radio division of NBT. It was established on 25 February 1930. It currently comprises five AM and six FM radio stations, as well as World Service, a foreign language international shortwave radio station launched on 20 October 1938.

=== Television channels ===
==== NBT 2HD ====
Logo of NBT2 HD

NBT 2HD, formerly TVT11, is the television division and free-to-air channel of NBT.

NBT operated TV stations outside of Bangkok before launching there in 1985. It initiated its plan in 1962 to serve the regions. In 1966, the British Pye company won a technical supply contract for a station in Songkhla in the country's south while in 1977, its station in Khonkaen was damaged in a fire. Its station in Phuket was broadcasting in black and white as late as the early 1980s, when Channel 7 set up a station there.

In 1985, TVT started broadcasting in Bangkok, using a loan from the Japanese government's JICA. TVT11 began broadcasting on 11 July 1988, when TV9 (now Modernine TV) split into two channels. It was first aimed at viewers in the countryside. As a government-controlled channel, NBT censors sexual and violent content.

NBTTV is also available over the TrueVisions direct broadcast satellite platform on channel 5. Since 2014, when the logical channel numbers were given for the digital terrestrial platform, it has been broadcasting on channel 2.

On 1 April 2008, the channel began broadcasting 24 hours a day, adding programming for late-night viewers.

That year it was restructured by Information Minister Mun Pattanothai and renamed NBTTV.

Educational television programs were aired through this channel from 1988 to 1999, alternating with TV9 in the afternoon until 1994, when it aired in the morning. Daytime programming on TV9 started on 1 March 1994, causing ETV to be broadcast only on TV11.

NBTTV and the radio stations under the National Broadcasting Services of Thailand broadcast from their headquarters in Din Daeng, Bangkok.

During the analog era, it broadcast on VHF band III, although in some parts of Thailand, it transmits the signal on UHF where it is normally tuned to band 2. In the Bangkok Metropolitan Area, the VHF channel for TV11 is 11, with weaker transmission on channel 10 in certain parts of the Bangkok Metropolitan Area. It is also available over the NBTi DVB-T test transmission over a frequency of 658 MHz, SID 2. As of 1 January 2007, it is also available over a test DMB-T/H transmission on Band III.

==== NBT regional channels ====
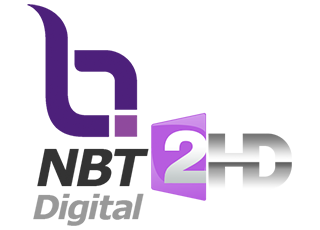
Former NBT logo used until 31 December 2024, with the right portion being taken from France 2's logo from 2008

Four regions of Thailand (North, Northeast, Central and South) have their own variant of the regional channel, and broadcast on DTT channel 11.

==== NBT World ====
Current NBT World logo

NBT World, launched in 2013, is the network's 24/7 English language television service aimed for Thai, ASEAN and Asian communities broadcast internationally via cable and satellite. Currently broadcast and can only be watched via the station page since 1 October 2022. However, NBT World is owned by the National News Bureau of Thailand under the Government Public Relations Department.

== Logo evolution ==
1985 (pre-launch)

1985–1987

1987–2001

2001–2008

2008–2009

2009–2024

2025–present

== Test cards ==
NBT used the Philips PM5544 test pattern (with clock).

== Presenters ==
=== Current ===
- Thanom Onketphon
- Paramet Phuto
- Jirapat Udomsiriwat
- S.Korakot Yodchai
- Krongkaew Chaikrit
- Supanan Ritmontri
- Pattamaporn Hanchanchai
- Jirapinya Pitimanaaree
- Sirilak Rattanawaropas
- Methee Chimjiew
- Satakun Damklueng
- Weerasak Khobkhet
- Nicha Dechsihathananon
- Jintana Thipparatkul
- Worapat Pattiyakul
- Akira Kijthanasopha
- Kannanat Phathornsuebnukul
- Areeyanan Satthammasakul
- Prathet Tara
- Patipat Khemtit
- Satun Phatthalung
- Phatchar Pattaradechatham
- Krittaya Rodratanathun
- Nichaphat Rungratanasathien
- Warut Kaesornratch
- Kamolchanok Ploythong
- Pathara Intarakamnerd
- Peeranat Champangern
- Phasit Suthikul
- Sirisaowapa Ekiamsin
- Sornwanee Promsen
- Jett Lertjarunwit
- Pattawadee Meesuna
- Sathanu Na Pattalung
- Chada Somboonphol
- Kanoknuan Jaratkunnahong
- Chanthima Silachart
- Cholaphansa Narula
- Dhra Dhirakaosal
- Sandra Hanutsaha
- Suraphan Laotharanarit

=== Former ===
- Nantiya Jitasopawadee
- Wirat Mahan
- Teerat Churat
- Manut Tangsuk
- Parin Jeasuwan (now at TNN16)

== See also ==
- Mass media in Thailand
- Television in Thailand
- List of radio stations in Thailand
- List of television channels in Thailand
