= List of television channels in Thailand =

This is a list of television channels in Thailand. All analog television broadcasters have completely switched over to digital since 26 March 2020. Channel 3 was the last broadcaster that ceased broadcasting on analog television.

== Public broadcasters ==
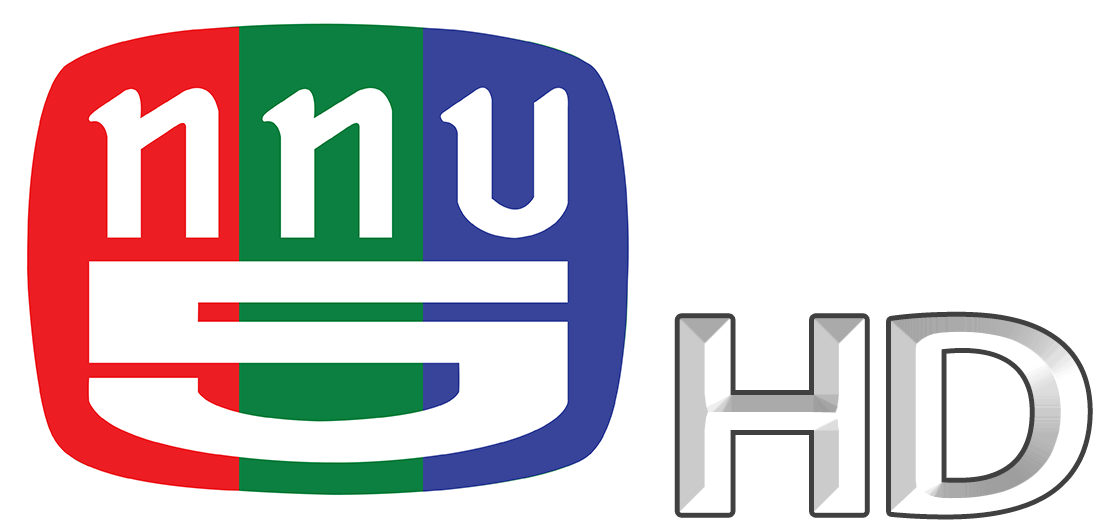
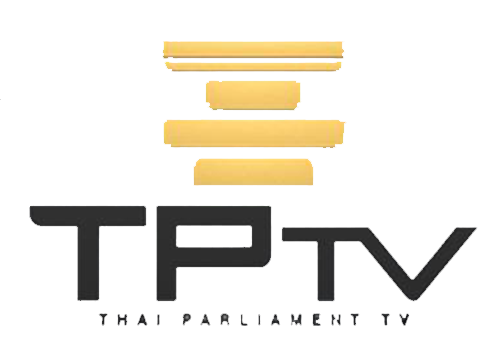
LCN	Logo	Channel Name	Owners	Main Station	Broadcast Area	Broadcast hours	Format
2		National Broadcasting Services of Thailand	Public Relations Department	Bangkok	Nationwide	04:55 – 00:30 (Next Day)	1080i HDTV (MPEG-4)
3	-	Thai Public Broadcasting Service		Bangkok	Nationwide	05:00 – 01:00 (Next Day)	1080i HDTV (MPEG-4)
5		RTA5	Royal Thai Army	Bangkok	Nationwide	24 hours	1080i HDTV (MPEG-4)
7	-	T Sports 7	Sports Authority of Thailand	Bangkok	Nationwide	05:00 – 00:00 (Next Day)	576i SDTV (MPEG-4)
10		Thai Parliament Television	National Assembly of Thailand	Bangkok	Nationwide	05:00 – 00:00 (Next Day)	576i SDTV (MPEG-4)
11		NBT North	Public Relations Department	Chiang Mai	Northern Region and Lopburi	-	576i SDTV (MPEG-4)
11		NBT Northeast	Public Relations Department	Khon Kaen	Northeastern Region	-	576i SDTV (MPEG-4)
11		NBT Central	Public Relations Department	Chanthaburi	Central, Western, Eastern Region and including Bangkok	-	576i SDTV (MPEG-4)
11		NBT South	Public Relations Department	Surat Thani	Southern Region	-	576i SDTV (MPEG-4)

== Commercial broadcasters ==
All commercial television channels are national and operate 24 hours.

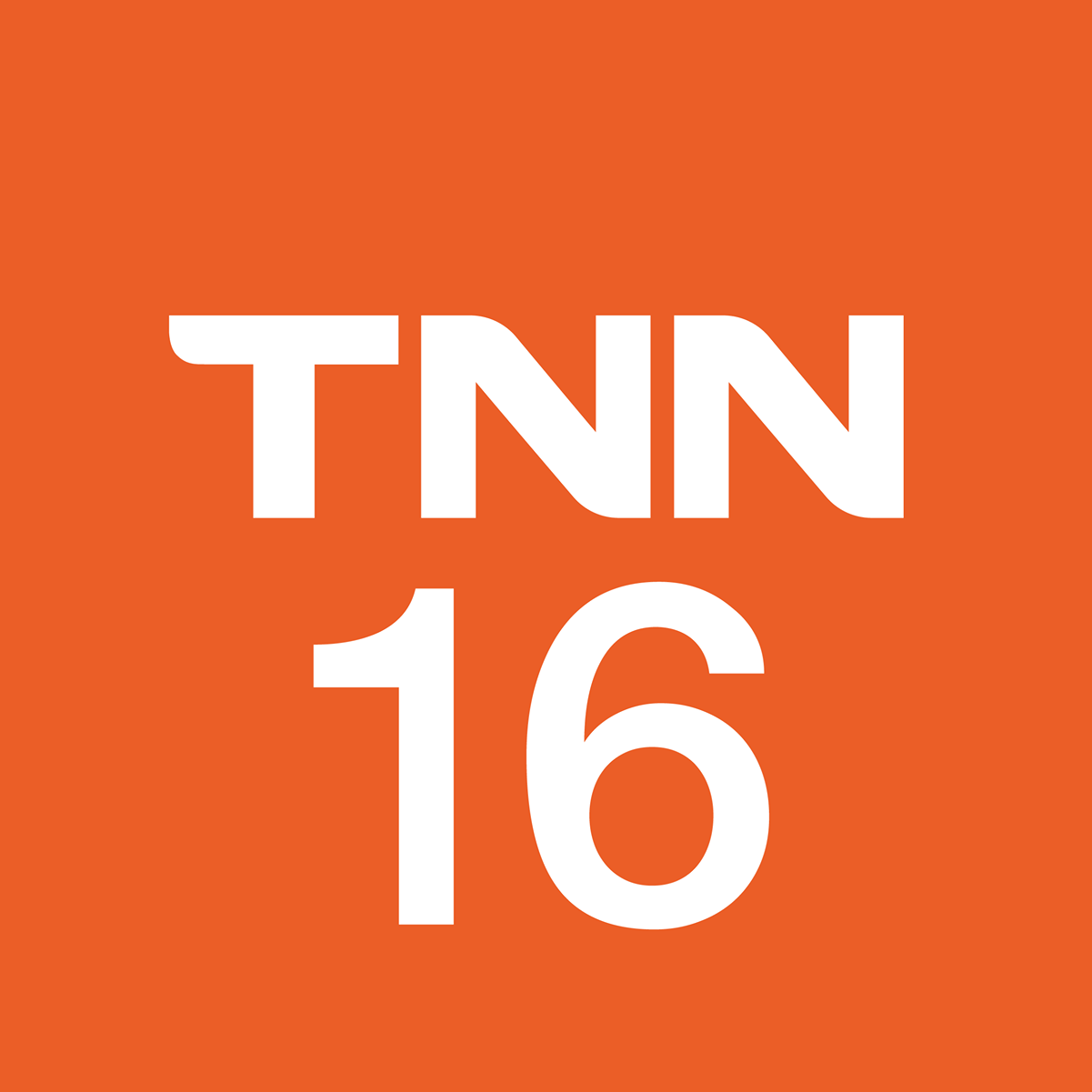
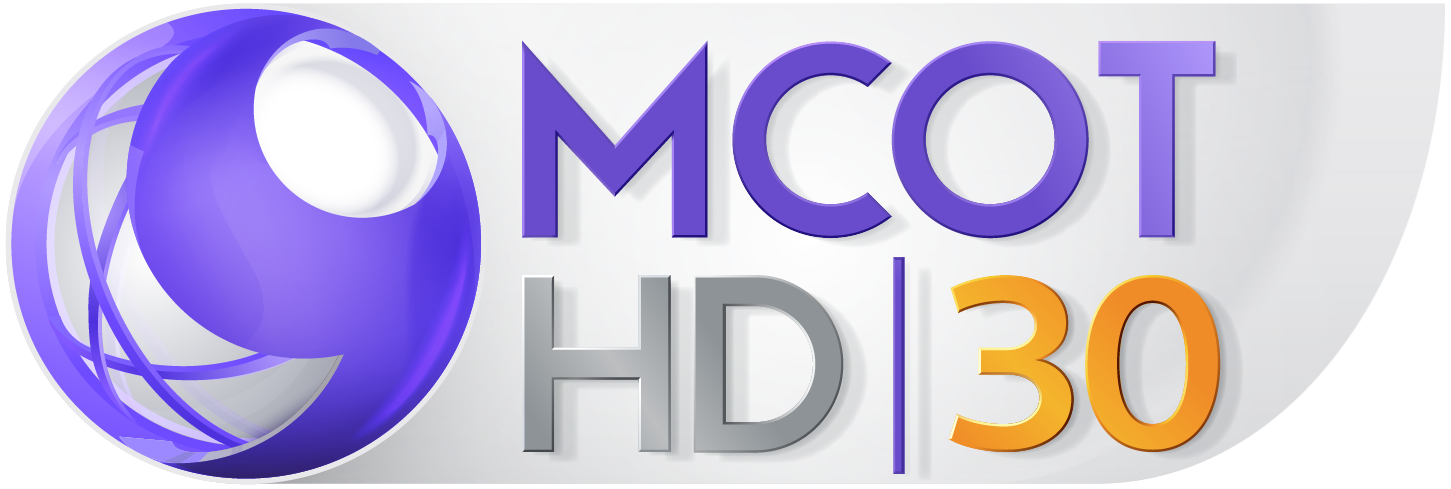
LCN	Logo	Channel Name	Owners	Subsidiary	Channel Type	Format
16		TNN16	True Corporation	TrueVisions	News and Current Events	576i SDTV (MPEG-4)
22		Nation TV	Nation Group		News and Current Events	576i SDTV (MPEG-4)
23		Workpoint	Workpoint Entertainment		General entertainment & Variety	576i SDTV (MPEG-4)
24	-	True4U	True Corporation	TrueVisions	General entertainment & Variety	576i SDTV (MPEG-4)
25	-	GMM25	GMM Grammy		General entertainment & Variety	576i SDTV (MPEG-4)
27		Channel 8	RS Group	RS Multimedia	General entertainment & Variety	576i SDTV (MPEG-4)
29		MONOMAX Sports	MONO Next		Sports	576i SDTV (MPEG-4)
30		9MCOT	MCOT		General entertainment & Variety	1080i HDTV (MPEG-4)
31	-	ONE31	GMM Grammy	The One Enterprise	General entertainment & Variety	1080i HDTV (MPEG-4)
32		Thairath TV	Thairath	Triple V Broadcast	General entertainment & Variety	1080i HDTV (MPEG-4)
33		Channel 3	BEC World	BEC Multimedia Company Limited	General entertainment & Variety	1080i HDTV (MPEG-4)
34		Amarin TV	Amarin Group		General entertainment & Variety	1080i HDTV (MPEG-4)
35		Channel 7	Bangkok Broadcasting & Television Company Limited		General entertainment & Variety	1080i HDTV (MPEG-4)
36		PPTV	Bangkok Media & Broadcasting		General entertainment & Variety	1080i HDTV (MPEG-4)

== Cable, satellite, and IPTV channels ==
=== A ===
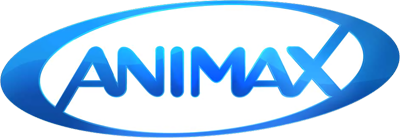
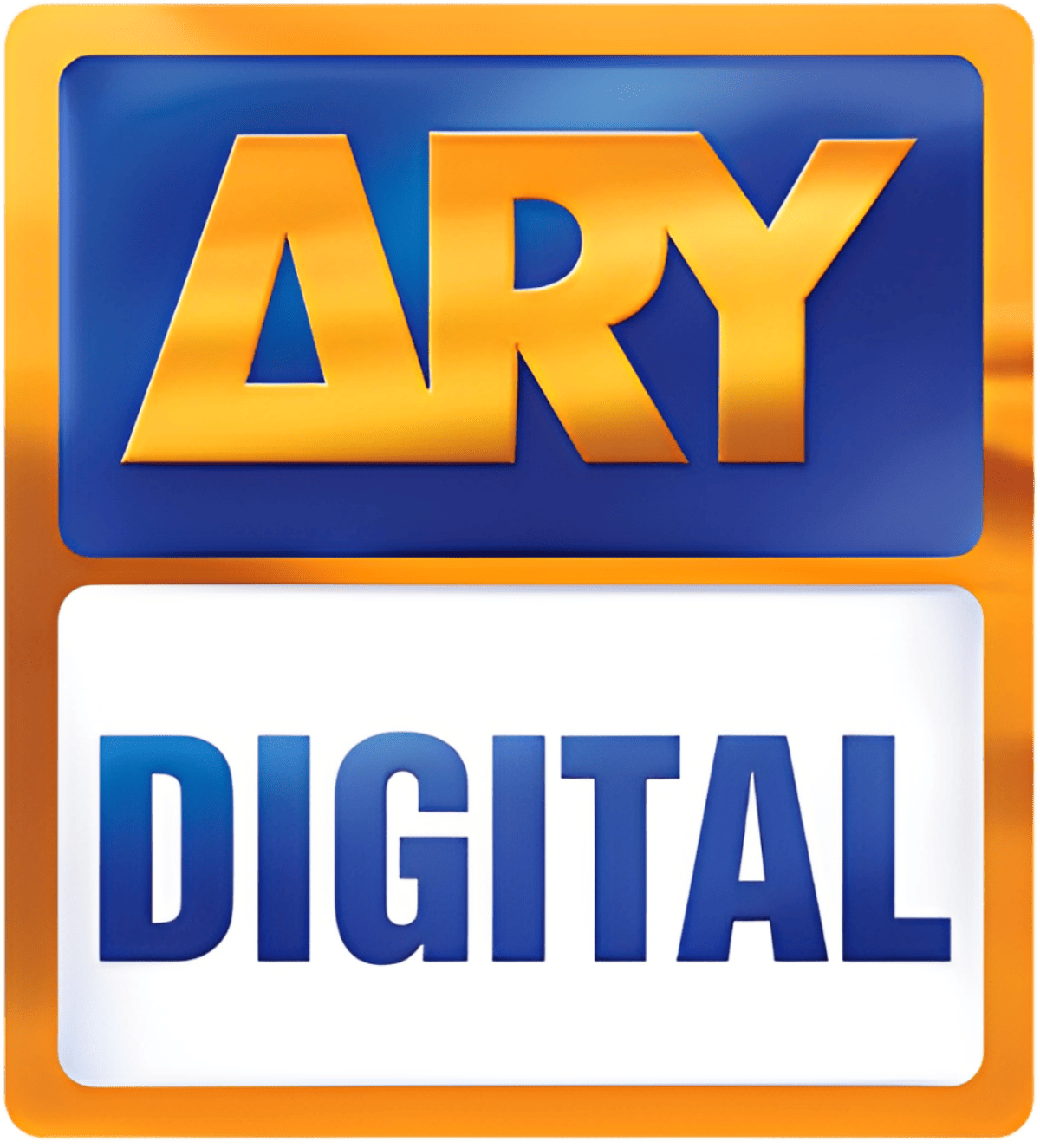
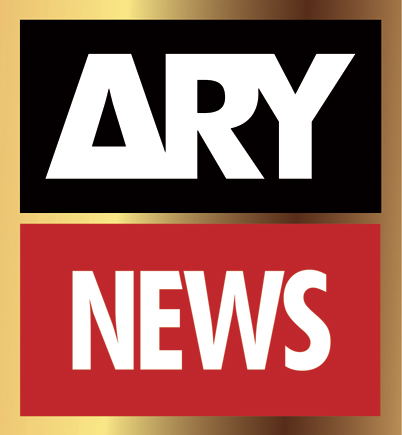
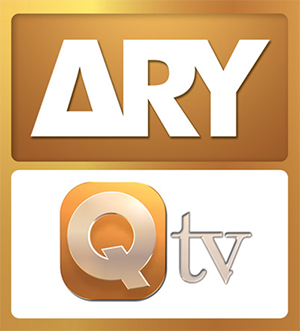
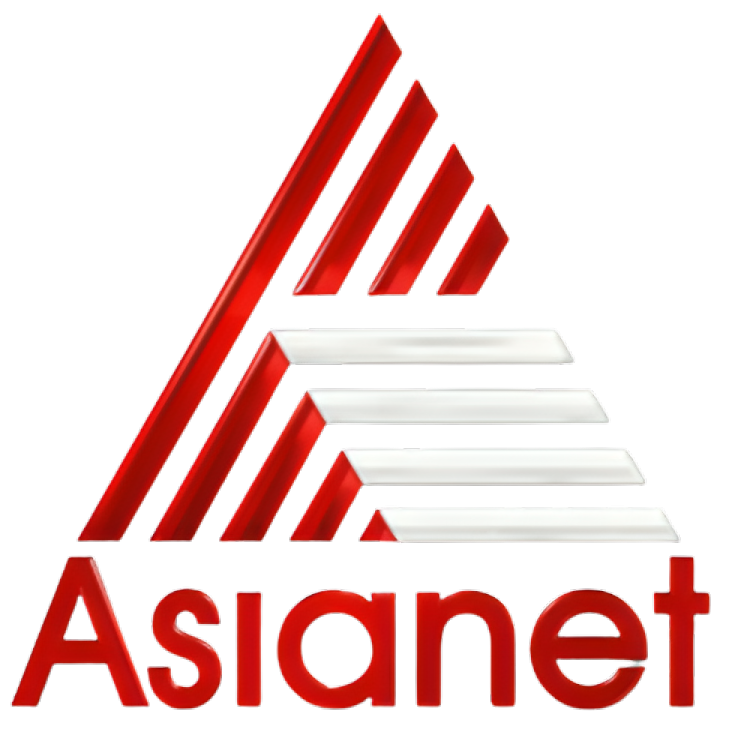
Logo	Channel Name	Owners	Channel Type
	A Sports	Salman Iqbal	Sports and Live Events
	Aaj Tak	Living Media	News and Current Events
	Aastha India	Aacharya Balkrishna	Religious
	ABC Australia	Australian Broadcasting Corporation	General entertainment and Variety
	ABC News Australia	Australian Broadcasting Corporation	News and Current Events
	ABC News Live	The Walt Disney Company	News and Current Events
	ABP News	ABP Group	News and Current Events
	Al Arabiya	MBC Group	News and Current Events
	Al Jazeera Arabic	Al Jazeera Media Network	News and Current Events
	Al Jazeera English	Al Jazeera Media Network	News and Current Events
	ANC	ABS-CBN Corporation	News and Current Events
	&TV	Zee Entertainment Enterprises	Entertainment
	Anhui TV		Entertainment
	Animal Planet	Skydance Corporation	Documentaries
	Animax	KC Global Media Asia Entertainment	Children’s Programming
	Aniplus Asia	Plus Media Networks Asia	Children’s Programming
	Arirang TV	Korea International Broadcasting Foundation	Entertainment
	ARY Digital	Salman Iqbal	Entertainment
	ARY News	Salman Iqbal	News and Current Events
	ARY Qtv	Salman Iqbal	Religious
	Asian Food Network	Skydance	Documentaries and Lifestyle
	Asianet	JioStar	Entertainment
	Astro Badminton	Astro	Sports and Live Events
	Astro Football	Astro	Sports and Live Events
	Astro Grandstand	Astro	Sports and Live Events
	Astro Premier League	Astro	Sports and Live Events
	Astro Premier League 2	Astro	Sports and Live Events
	Astro Sports Plus	Astro	Sports and Live Events
	ATN Bangla	Multimedia Production Company	Lifestyle
	ATN News	Multimedia Production Company	News and Current Events
	AXN	KC Global Media Asia Entertainment	Action programming

=== B ===
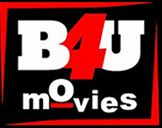
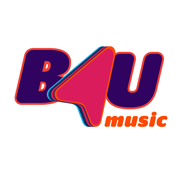
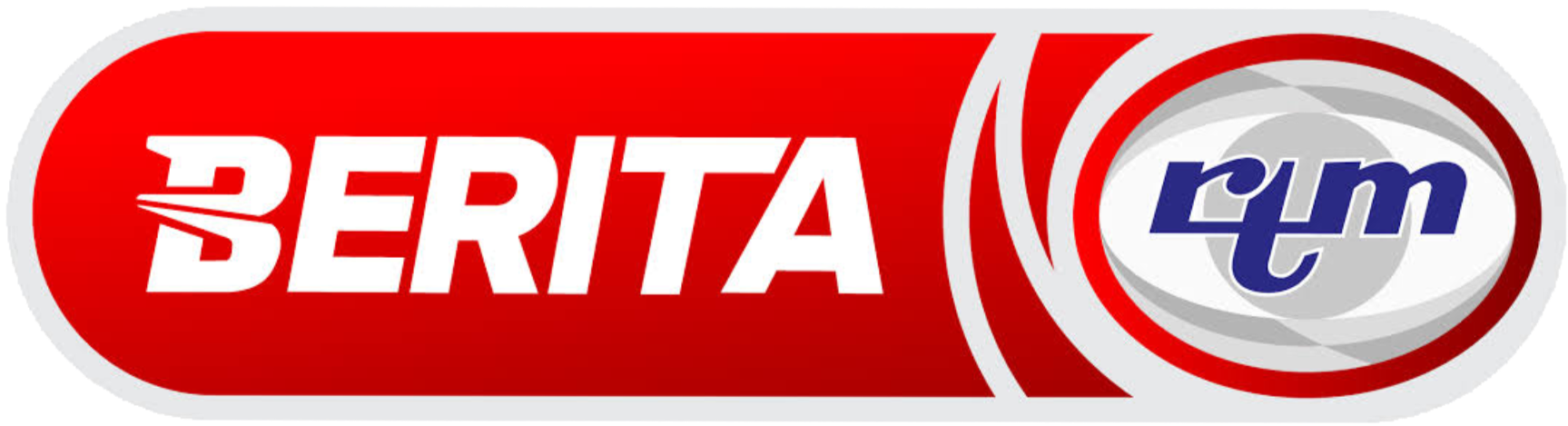
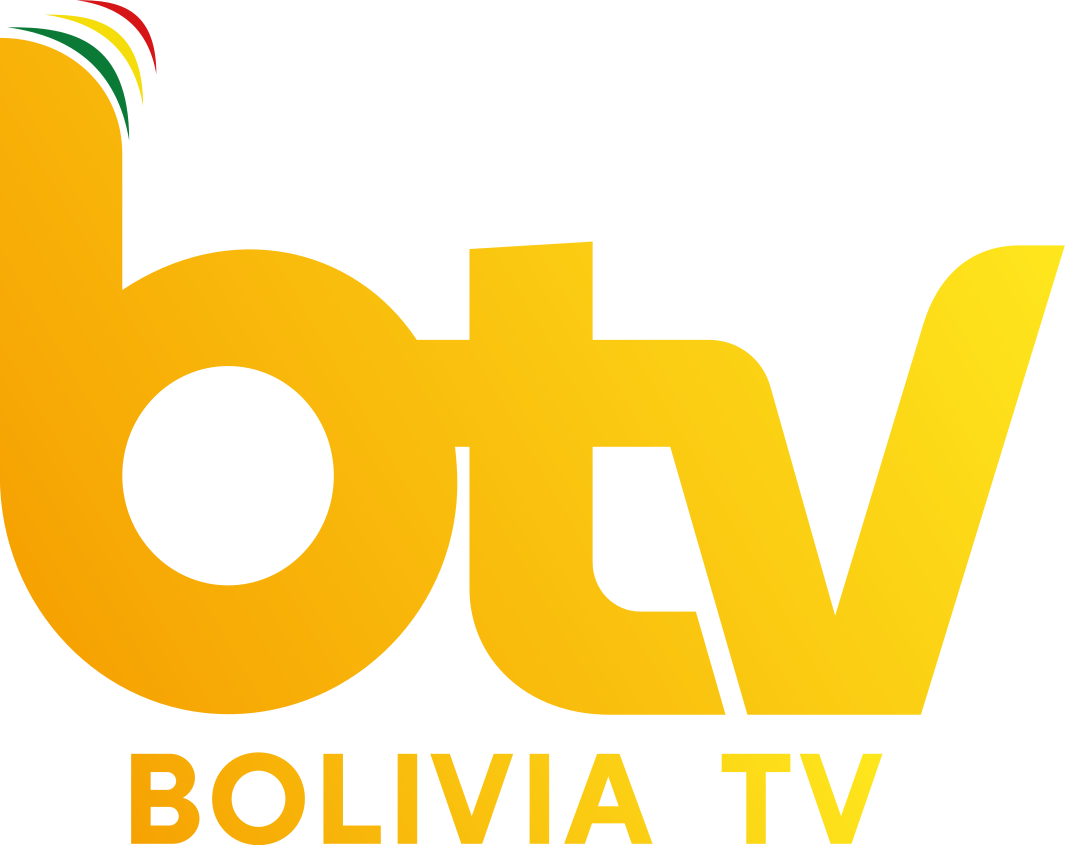
Logo	Channel Name	Owners	Channel Type
	B4U Movies	B4U	General entertainment and Variety
	B4U Music	B4U	Music programming
	Bangla TV		Lifestyle
	BBC Earth	BBC Studios	Documentary
	BBC Lifestyle	BBC Studios	Lifestyle
	BBC News	BBC Studios	News and Current Events
	Bein Sports 1	Bein Sports	Sports
	Bein Sports 2	Bein Sports	Sports
	Bein Sports 3	Bein Sports	Sports
	Belarus 24	Belteleradio	News and Current Events
	Berita RTM	RTM	News and Current Events
	Bloomberg Television	Bloomberg	News and Current Events
	Bolivia TV	Empresa Estatal Bolivia Télévision	News and Current Events
	BNT 4	Bulgarian National Television	News and Current Events
	BTV News	Bangladesh Television	News and Current Events

=== C ===
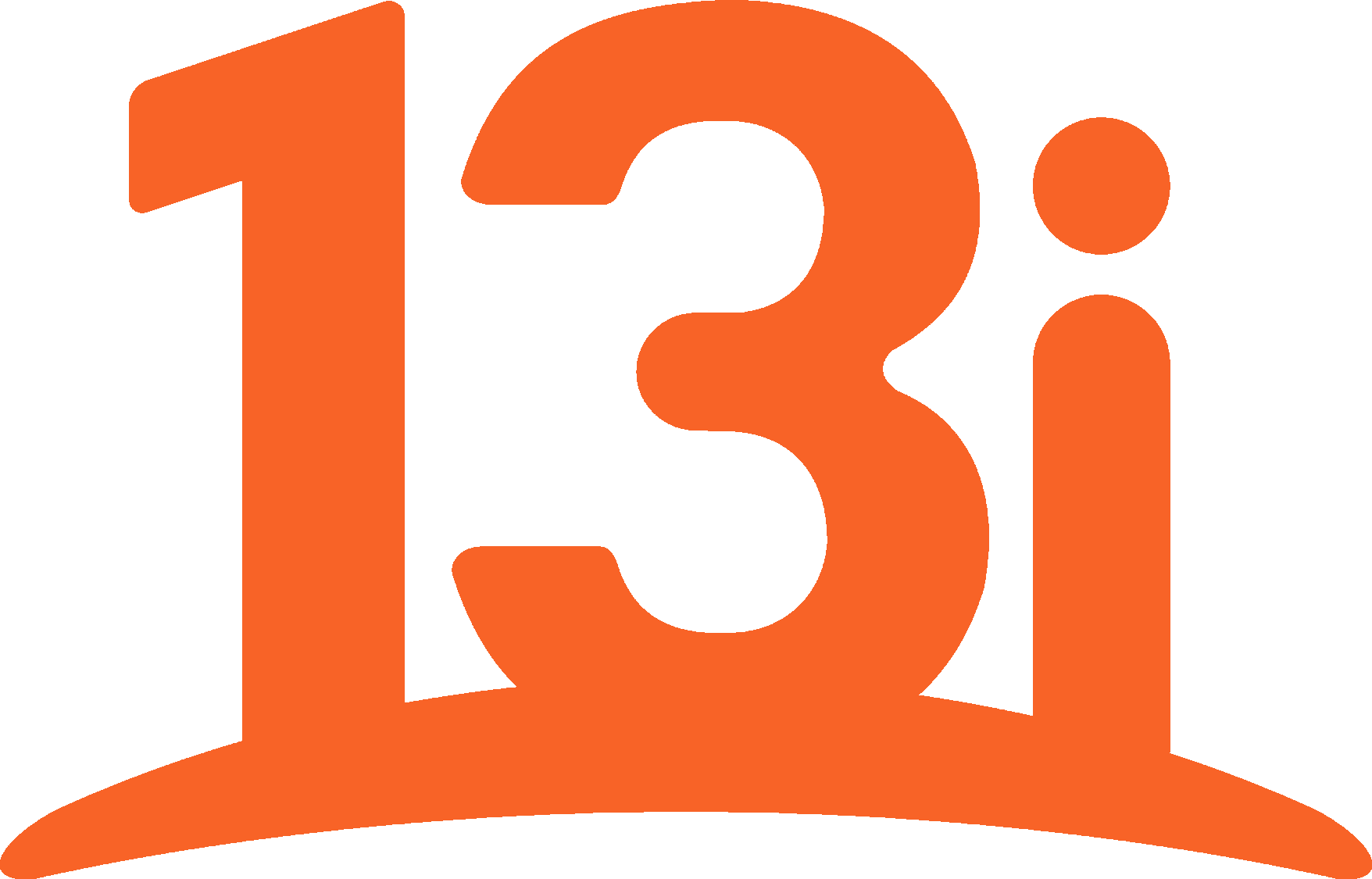
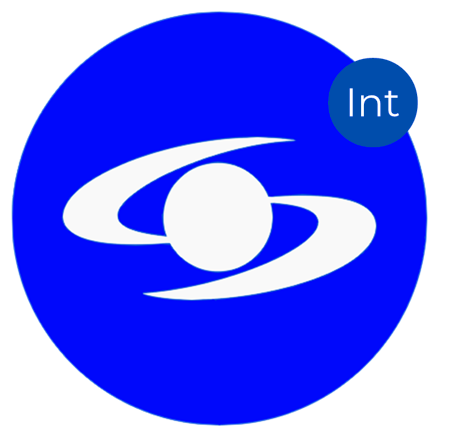
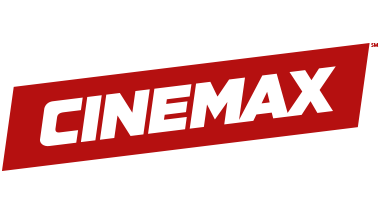
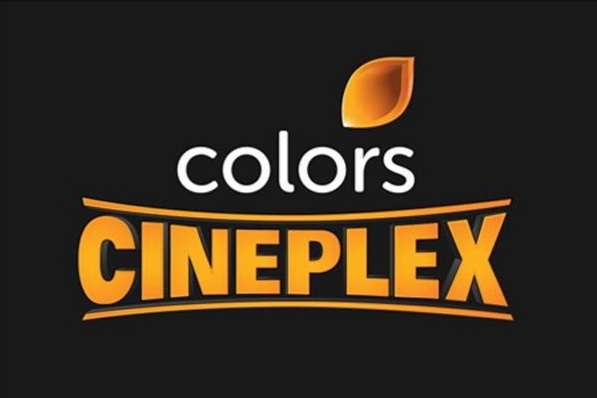
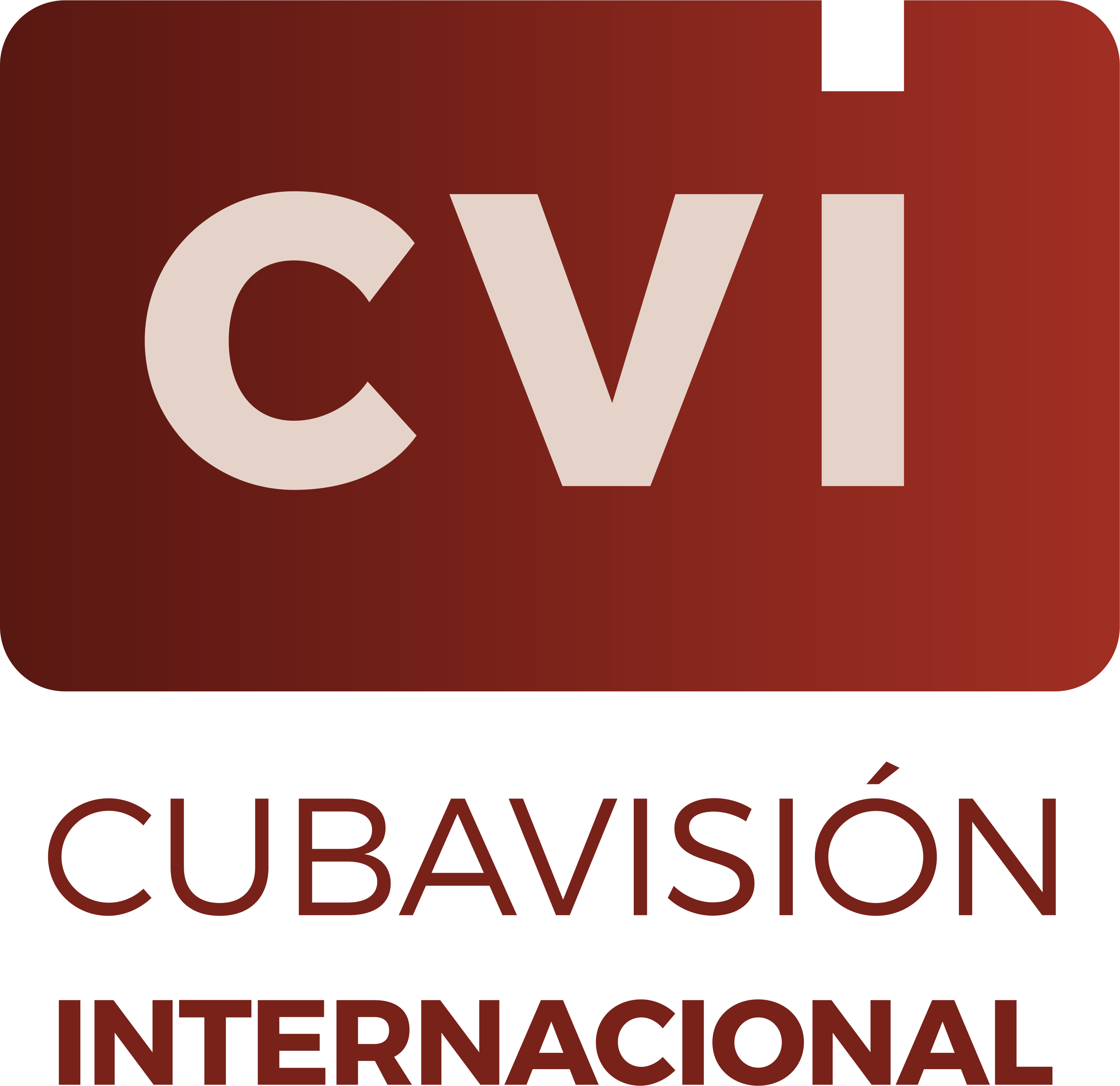
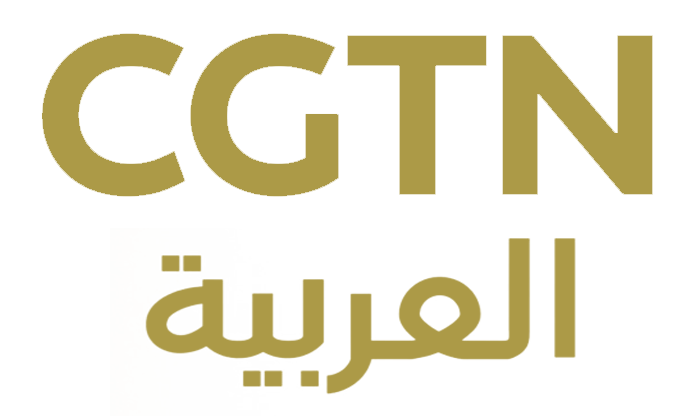
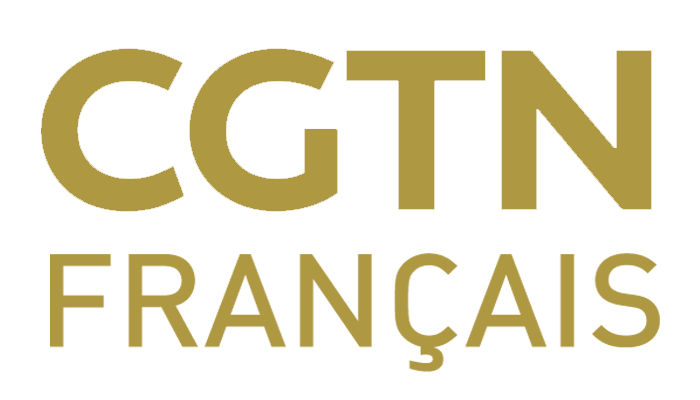
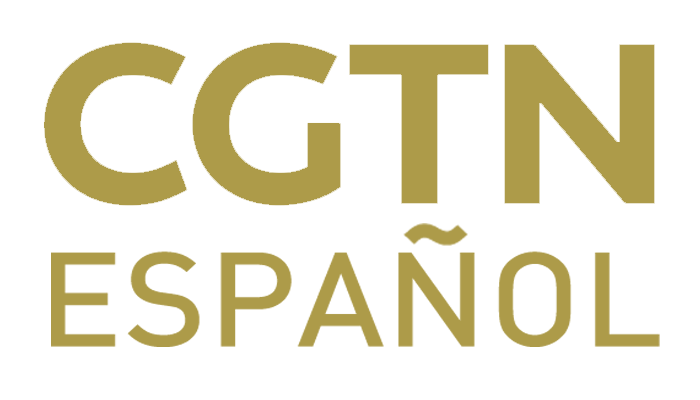
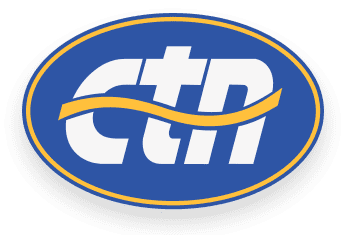
Logo	Channel Name	Owners	Channel Type
	Canal 13 Internacional	Canal 13 SpA	News and Current Events
	Canal Siete	Chief of the Cabinet of Ministers	Educational content
	Caracol Internacional	Caracol Televisión S.A.	Lifestyle
	Cartoon Network	Skydance	Children’s programming
	Cartoonito	Skydance	Children’s programming
	CBeebies	BBC Studios	Children’s programming
	CBS News 24/7	Skydance	News and Current Events
	Celestial Movies	Celestial Tiger Entertainment	Movies
	Channel I	Impress Group	Lifestyle
	Channel One		News and Current Affairs
	Cinemax	Skydance	Premium Films and Content
	Cinema One	ABS-CBN Corporation	Movies
	Colors Cineplex	JioStar	Entertainment
	Colors Tamil	JioStar	Entertainment
	Colors TV	JioStar	Entertainment
	Cubavisión Internacional	ICRT	Entertainment
-	Celestial Classic Movies	Star China Media	Movies
	CNA	Mediacorp	News and Current Events
	CNN International	Skydance	News and Current Events
	CCTV-1	China Central Television	Lifestyle
	CCTV-4	China Central Television	General content
	CGTN	China Media Group	News and Current Events
	CGTN Arabic	China Media Group	News and Current Events
	CGTN French	China Media Group	News and Current Events
	CGTN Russian	China Media Group	News and Current Events
	CGTN Spanish	China Media Group	News and Current Events
	CGTN Documentary	China Media Group	Documentaries
	China Education Television	Ministry of Education	Educational content
	Christian Television Network		Religious
	CNBC Asia	Versant	News and Current Events
	Crime & Investigation Network	A+E Global Media; Astro Malaysia Holdings	True Crime and Investigation

=== D ===
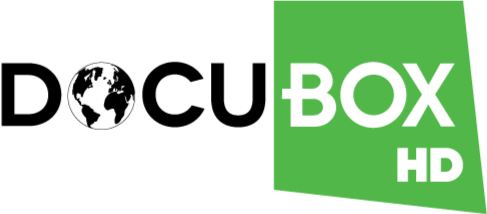
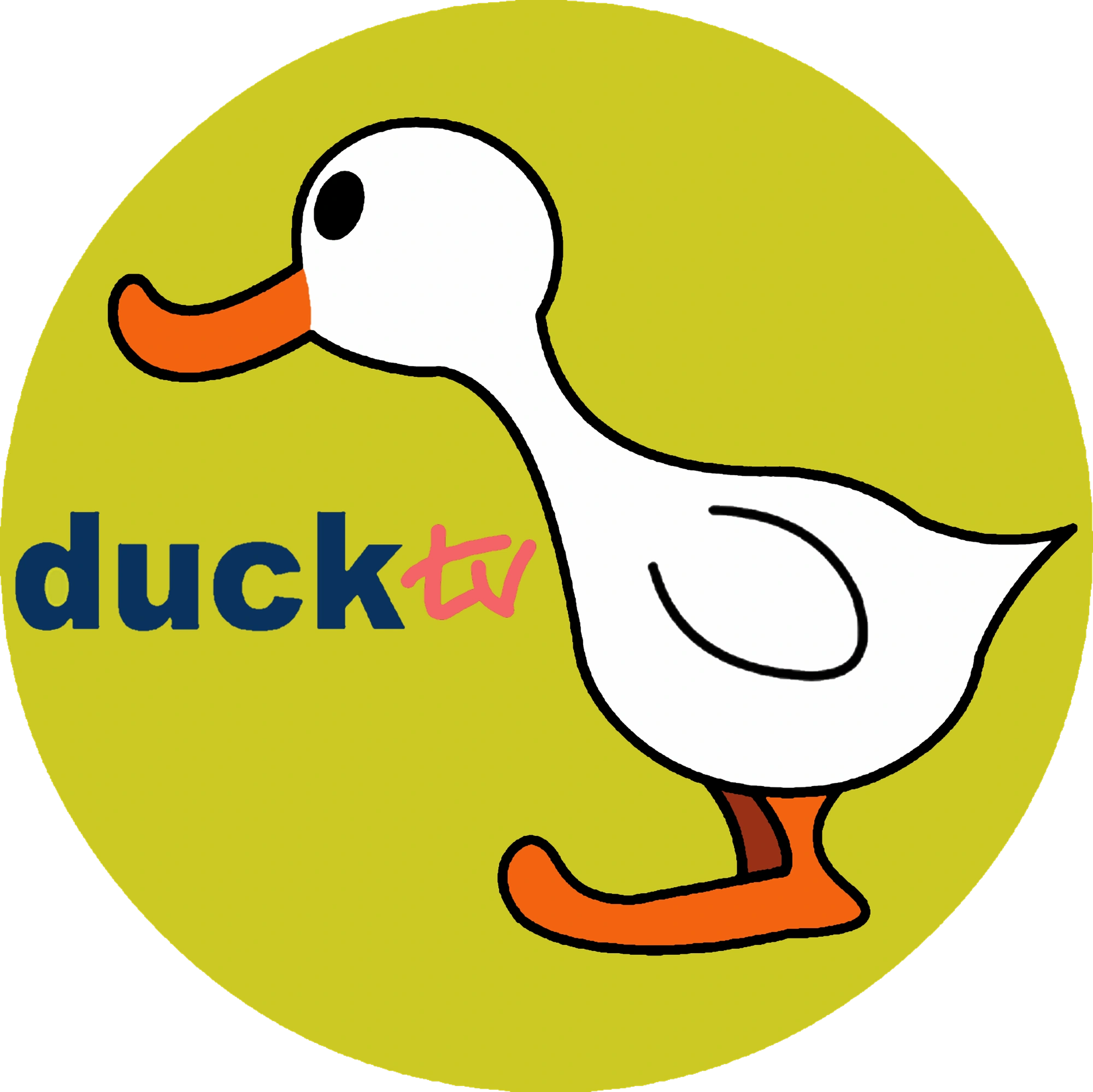
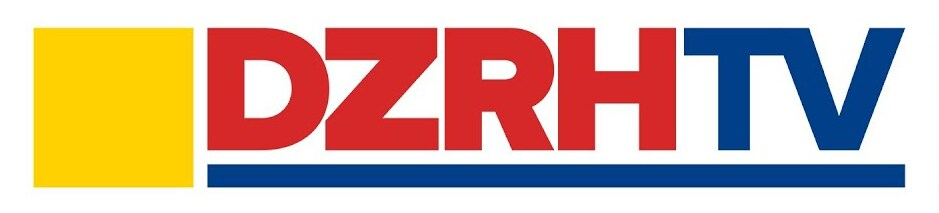
Logo	Channel Name	Owners	Channel Type
	Daystar TV	Word of God Fellowship	Religious
	DD India	Doordarshan	News and Current Affairs
-	DD News	Doordarshan	News and Current Affairs
	DD Sports	Doordarshan	Sports
	Discovery Asia	Skydance	Documentary and Lifestyle
	Discovery Channel	Skydance	Documentary and Lifestyle
	DocuBox	SPI International	Documentary and Lifestyle
-	Dragon TV	Shanghai Media Group	News and Current Affairs
	DreamWorks	NBCUniversal	Children’s programming
	Dubai TV	Dubai Media Incorporated	Lifestyle
	Duck TV	Mega Max Media s.r.o.	Children’s programming
	DW English	Deutsche Welle	News and Current Affairs
	DZRH TV	MBC Media Group	News and Current Affairs

=== E ===
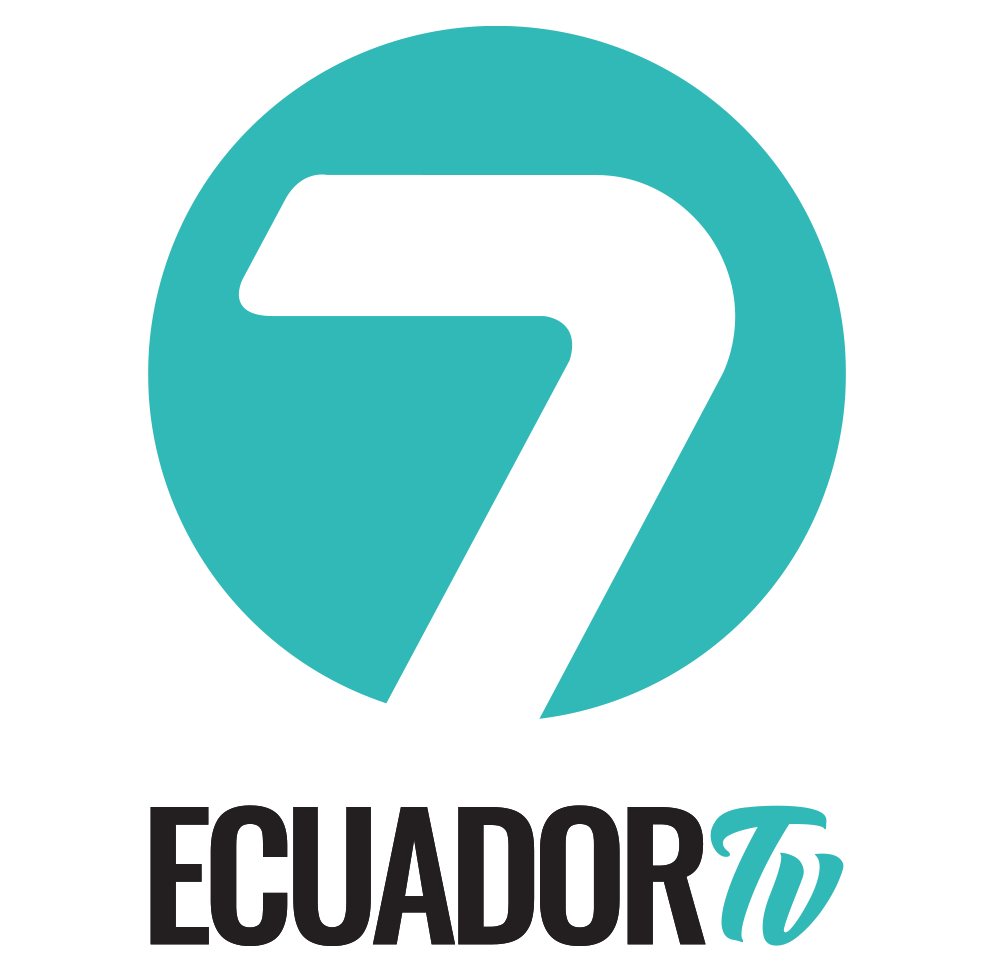
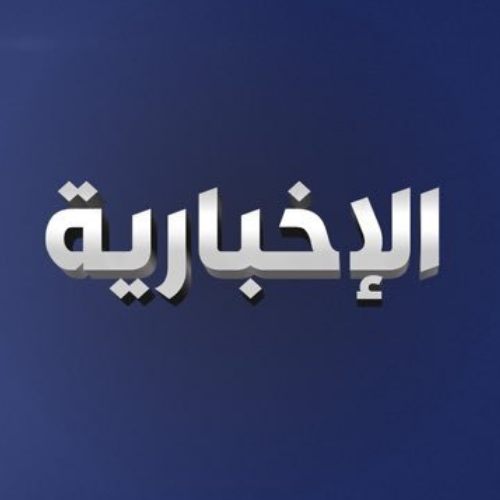
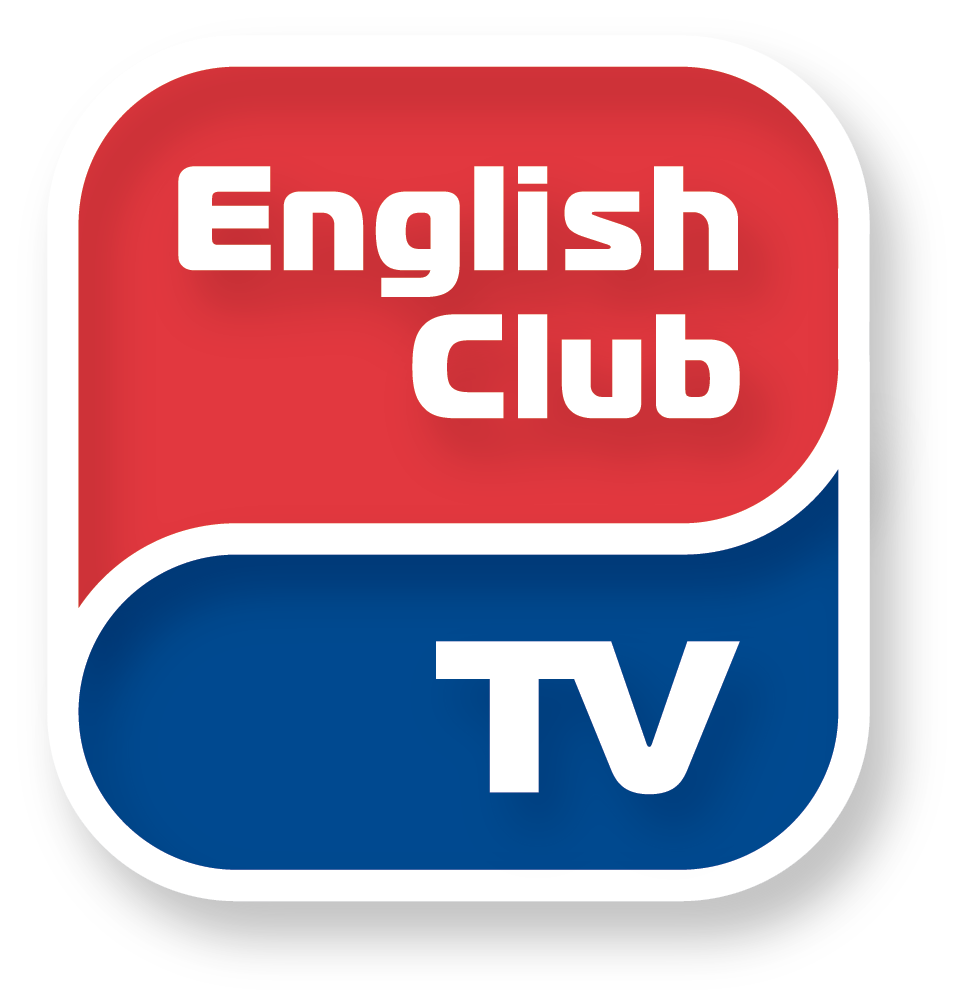
Logo	Channel Name	Owners	Channel Type
	Ecuador TV	Comunica EP	Lifestyle
	Ekhbariya TV	Saudi Broadcasting Authority	News and Current Affairs
	English Club TV	Oleg Naumov	Educational content
	ERT Cosmos	ERT	Lifestyle
	Euronews		News and Current Affairs
	Eurosport	Skydance	Sports and Live Events
	EWTN	Eteral Word Television Network Inc.	Religious

=== F ===
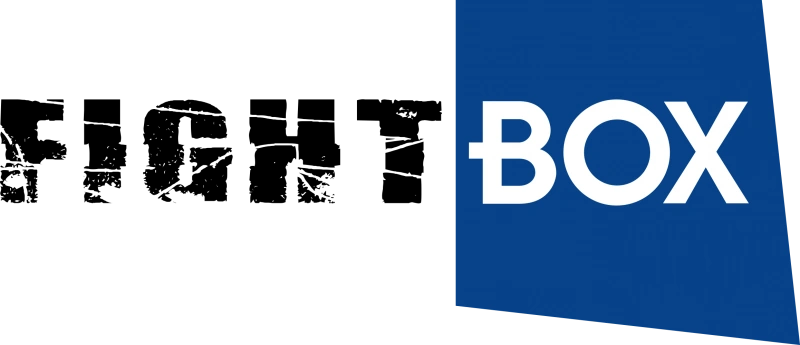
Logo	Channel Name	Owners	Channel Type
	Fashion TV		Lifestyle and Fashion
	FightBox HD	SPI International	Sports
	Food Network	Skydance	Lifestyle and Food
	FTV	Formosa Television	Lifestyle
	Fox Business	Fox Corporation	News and Current Affairs
	Fox News	Fox Corporation	News and Current Affairs
	France 24	France Médias Monde	News and Current Affairs
	Fuel TV	FUEL TV Global S.A.	Sports and Live Events

=== G ===
Logo	Channel Name	Owners	Channel Type
	GB News		News and Current Events
	Geo Entertainment	Jang Media Group	Lifestyle
	GMA Life TV	GMA Network	Lifestyle
	GMA News TV International	GMA Network	News and Current Events
	GMA Pinoy TV	GMA Network	Lifestyle
	God TV		Religious
	Good TV		Religious
	Golf Channel	USA Sports (Versant)	Sports and Live Events

=== H ===
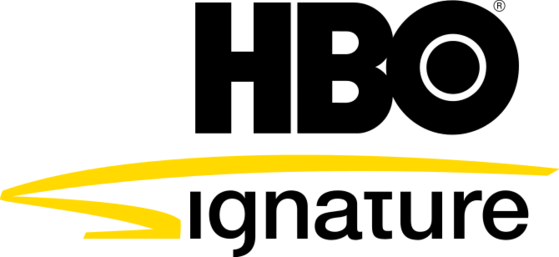
Logo	Channel Name	Owners	Channel Type
	24 Horas	RTVE	News and Current Events
	HBO Asia	Skydance	Premium Films and Content
	HBO Family	Skydance	Premium Films and Content
	HBO Hits	Skydance	Premium Films and Content
	HBO Signature	Skydance	Premium Films and Content
	HGTV	Skydance	Lifestyle
	Himalaya TV	Online Khabar	News and Current Events
	History	A+E Global Media	Documentaries
	Horse & Country TV	H&C TV Ltd.	Documentaries
	HSN	QVC Group	Lifestyle
	Hum TV	Sultana Siddiqui	Lifestyle
	Hunan TV	Hunan Broadcasting System	Lifestyle

=== I ===
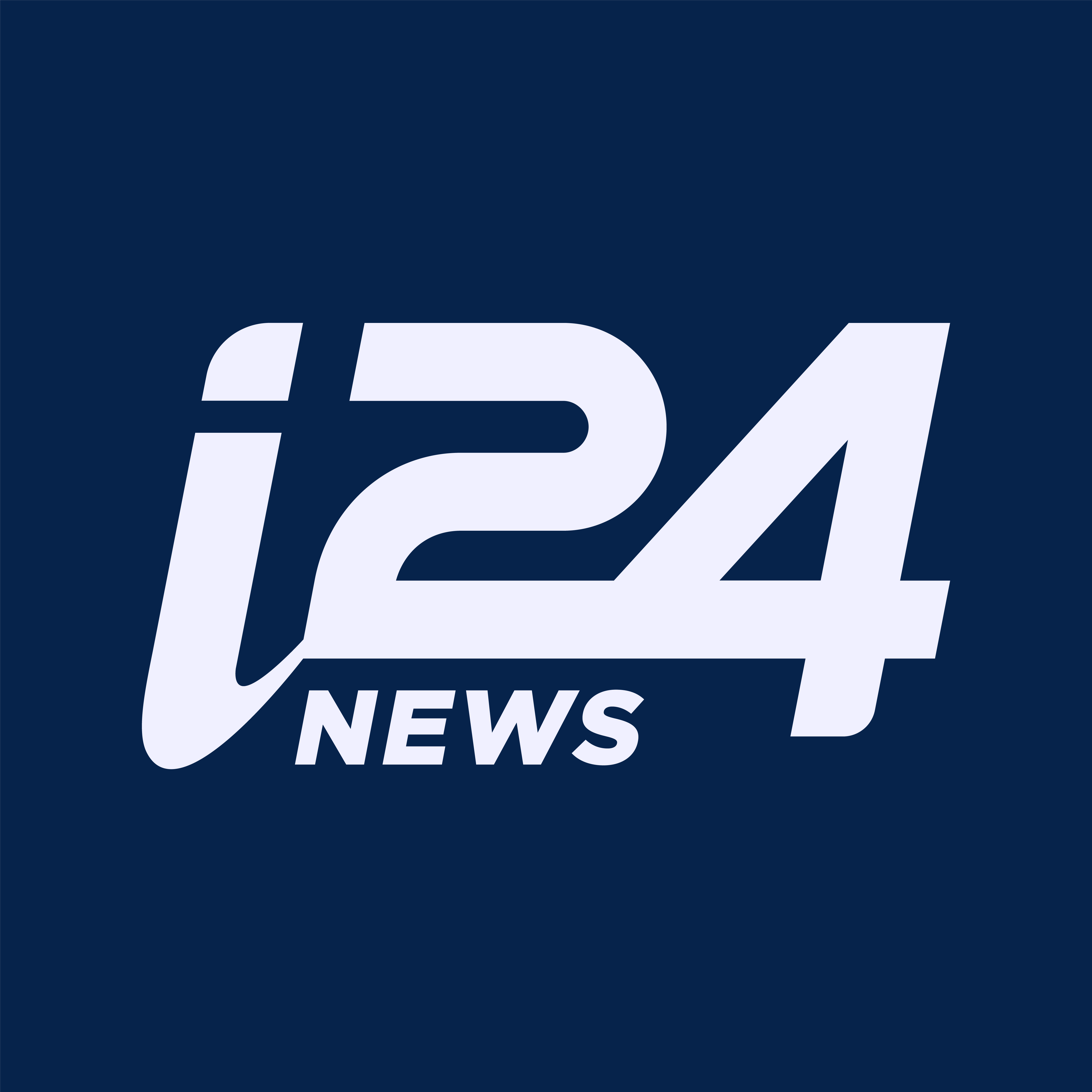
Logo	Channel Name	Owners	Channel Type
	i24NEWS English	Patrick Drahi	News and Current Events
	India Today	Living Media	News and Current Events
	Iran International	Volant Media UK Ltd	News and Current Events

=== K ===
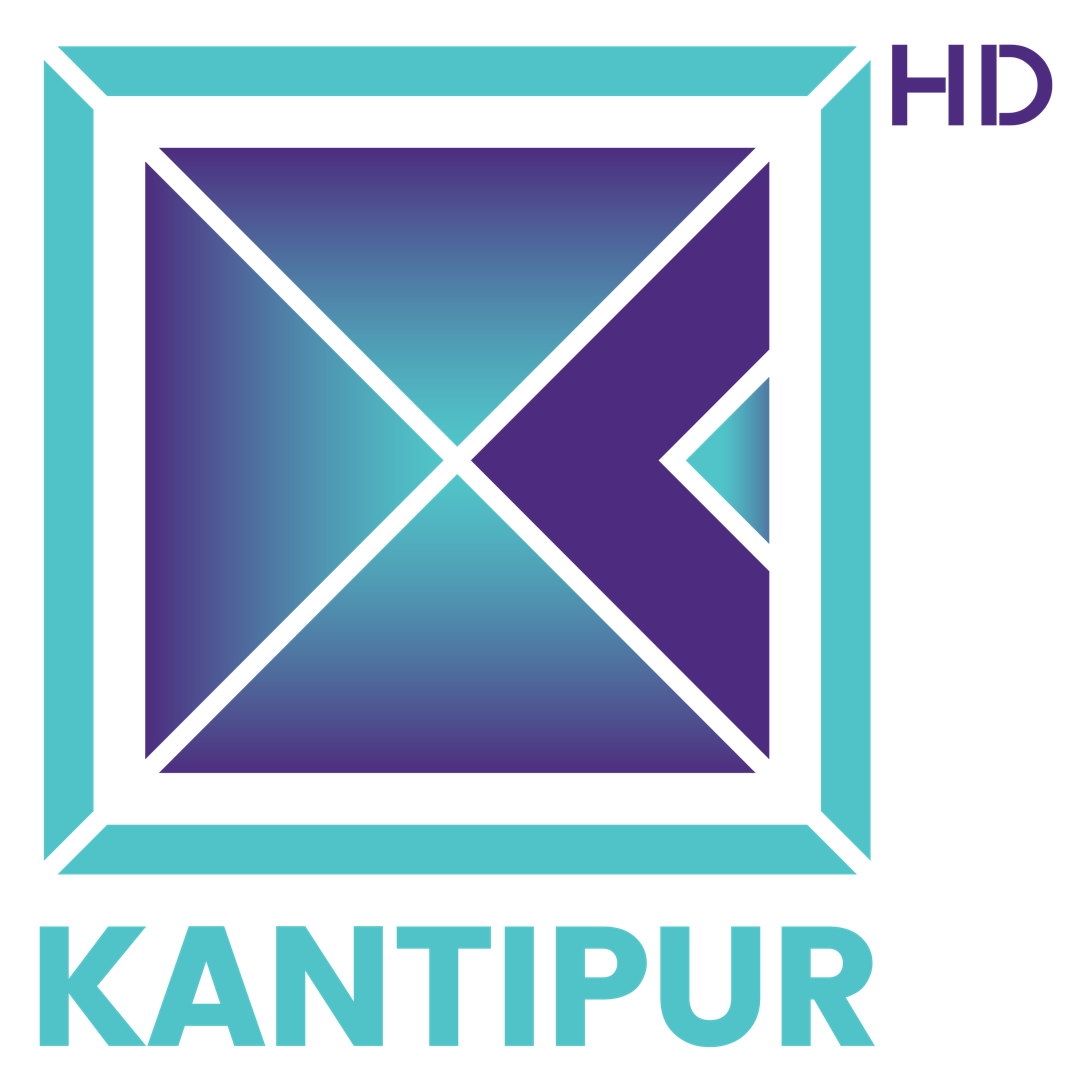
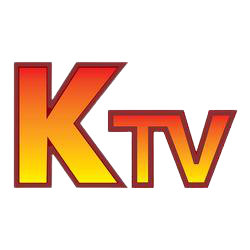
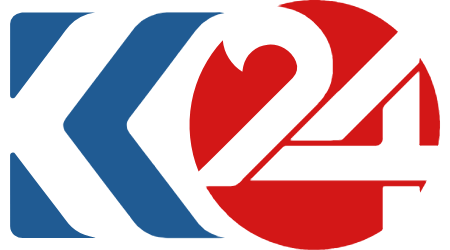
Logo	Channel Name	Owners	Channel Type
	Kantipur Television		News and Current Events
	Kapatid Channel	MediaQuest Holdings	Lifestyle
	KBS World	Korea Broadcasting System	Lifestyle
	Kix	Celestial Tiger Entertainment	Lifestyle
	KTV	Sun TV Network	Entertainment
	Kurdistan 24		News and Current Events
	Kuwait TV		Religious

=== L ===
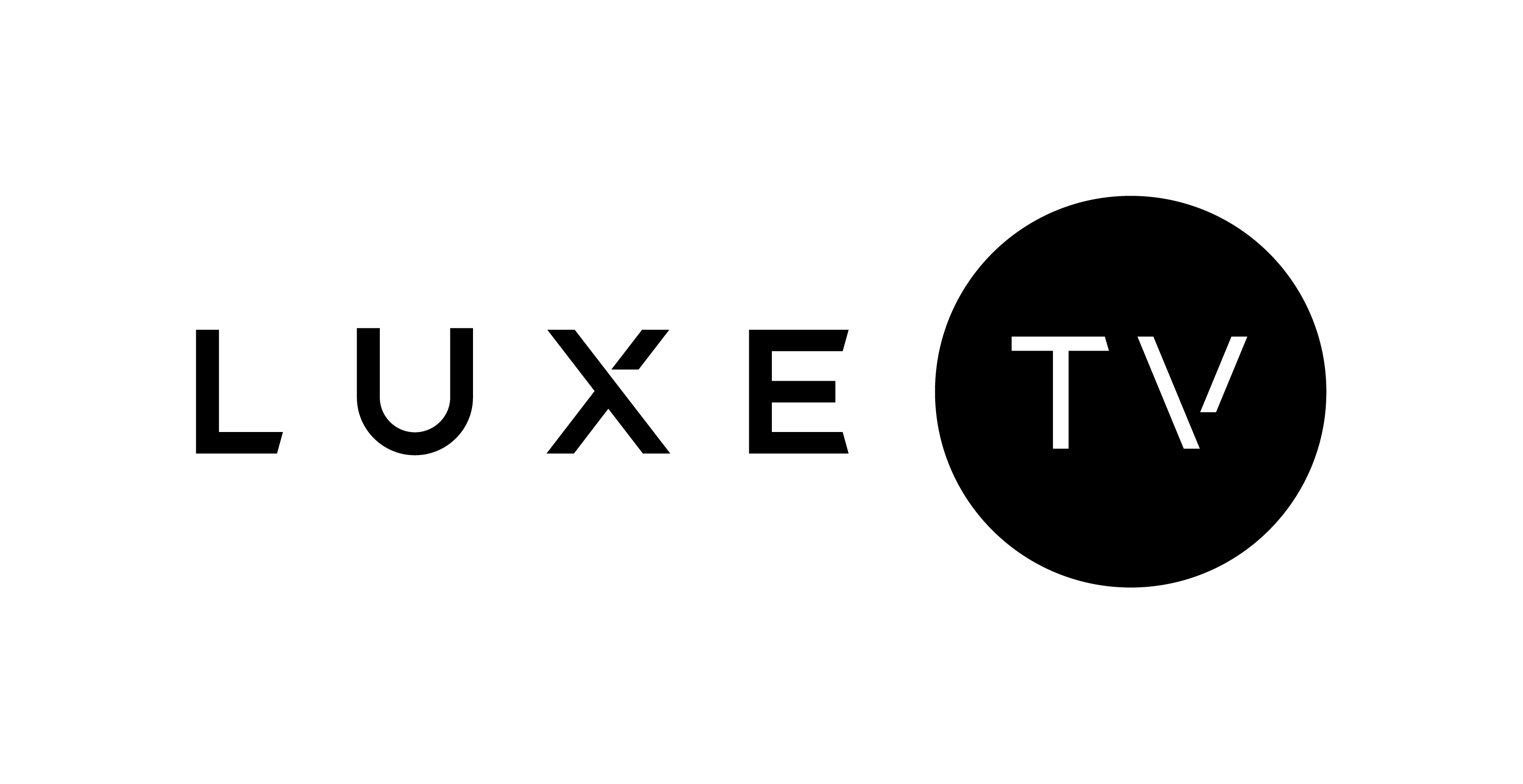
Logo	Channel Name	Owners	Channel Type
	LFC TV	Liverpool F.C.	Sports
	Lifetime	A+E Global Media	Lifestyle and Food
	LiveNow from Fox	Fox Corporation	News and Current Events
	Lotus TV Macau		Lifestyle
	Love Nature	Blue Ant Media	Documentaries
	LRT Lituanica	LRT	News and Current Events
	Luxe TV	Opuntia S.A.	Lifestyle and Fashion

=== M ===
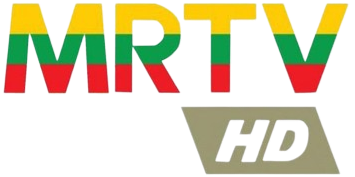
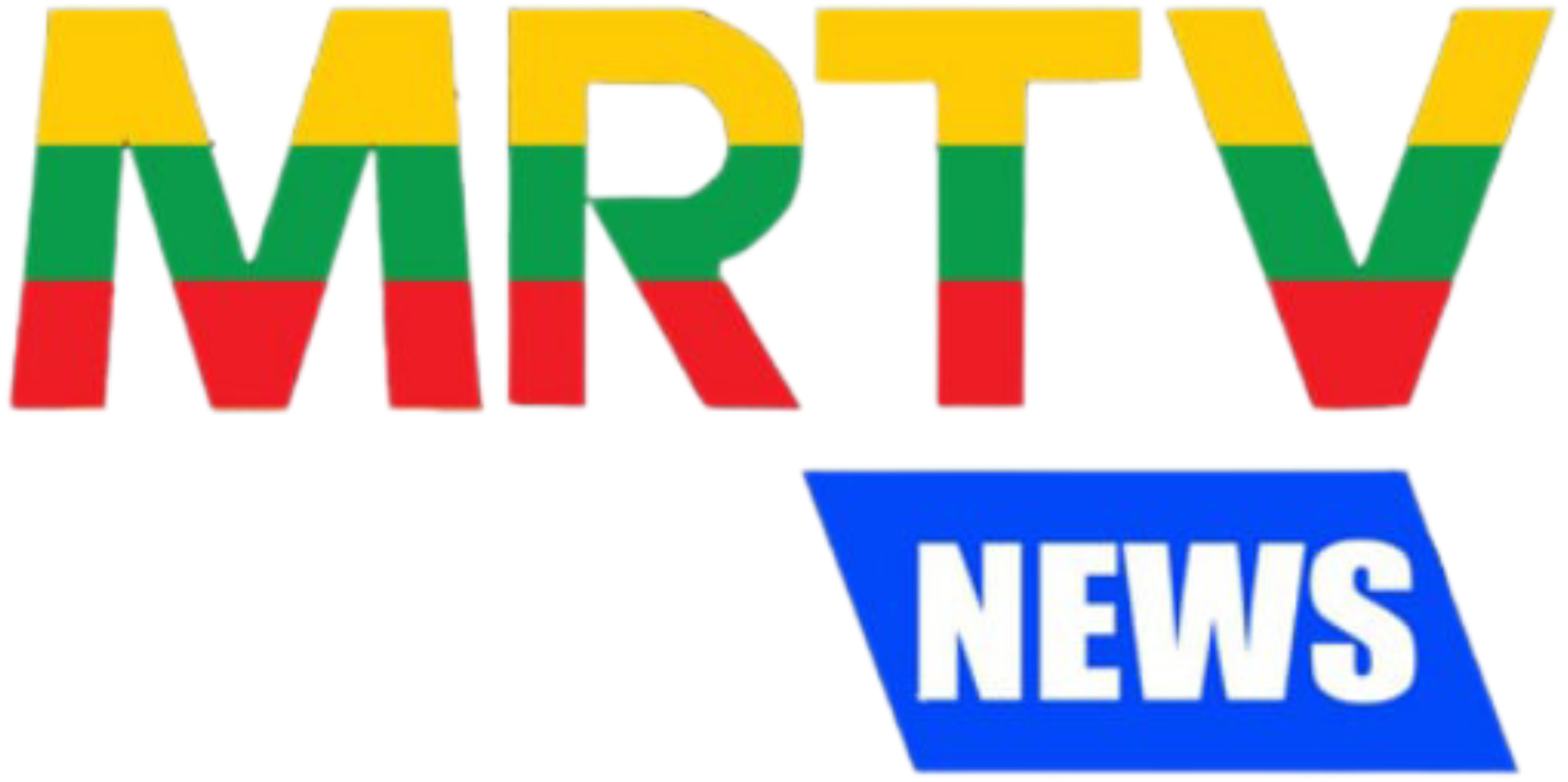
Logo	Channel Name	Owners	Channel Type
	MBC Bollywood	MBC Group	Entertainment
	Mediaset Italia	Mediaset	Entertainment
	Metro TV	Media Group	News and Current Events
	Mezzo TV	Canal+	Lifestyle and Fashion
	MNB World	MNB	Lifestyle
	MNX	The Times Group	Premium Films and Content
	Movies Now	The Times Group	Premium Films and Content
	MRTV HD	MRTV	Lifestyle
	MRTV News	MRTV	News and Current Affairs
	MS NOW	Versant	News and Current Affairs
	MTV India	JioStar	Music programming
	MUTV	Manchester United	Sports and Live Events
	Muz TV	National Media Group	Music programming
	Myanmar International	Ministry of Information	Lifestyle

=== N ===
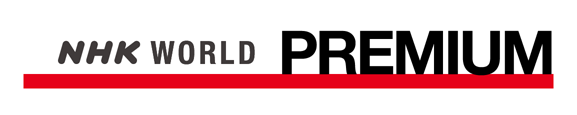
Logo	Channel Name	Owners	Channel Type
	NBA TV	NBA	Sports and Live Events
	NBC News Now	NBCUniversal	News and Current Events
	NDTV	NDTV	News and Current Events
	Nei Mongol TV		Lifestyle
	NHK World Japan	NHK	Lifestyle
	NHK World Premium	NHK	Lifestyle
	Nickelodeon	Skydance	Children’s programming
	Nick Jr.	Skydance	Children’s programming
	NTA International	Government of Nigeria	News and Current Events
	NTD TV	Epoch Media Group	News and Current Events
	NTN24	RCN Televisión	News and Current Events
	NTV	International Television Channel	Lifestyle

=== O ===
Logo	Channel Name	Owners	Channel Type
	Oman TV		Religious

=== P ===
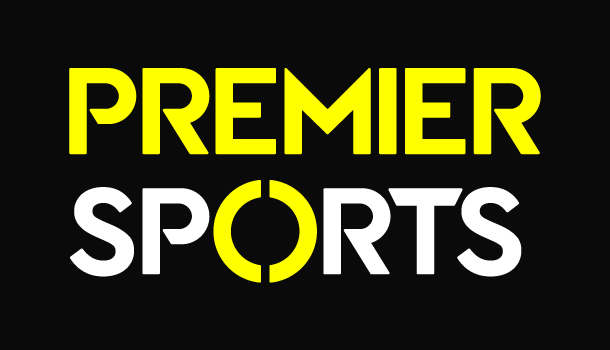
Logo	Channel Name	Owners	Channel Type
	Pakistan TV	Government of Pakistan	News and Current Events
	PBS Kids	PBS	Children’s programming
	Peace TV	Zakir Naik	Religious
	Phoenix Chinese Channel	Phoenix Television	Lifestyle
	Phoenix Hong Kong Channel	Phoenix Television	Lifestyle
	Phoenix InfoNews Channel	Phoenix Television	News and Current Events
	Premier Sports	Premier Media Broadcasting	Sports and Live Events
	Press TV	IRIB	News and Current Events
	PTV News	Pakistan Television Corporation	News and Current Events

=== Q ===
Logo	Channel Name	Owners	Channel Type
	Qatar TV	Qatar Media Corporation	Religious
	QVC	QVC Group	Lifestyle

=== R ===
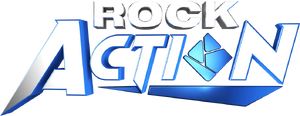
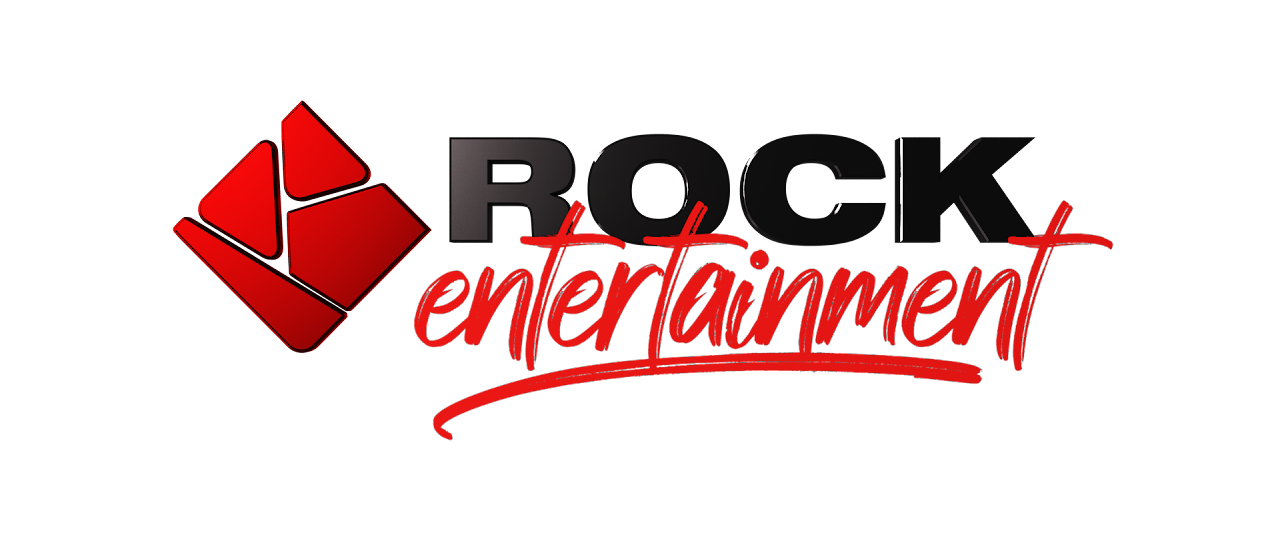
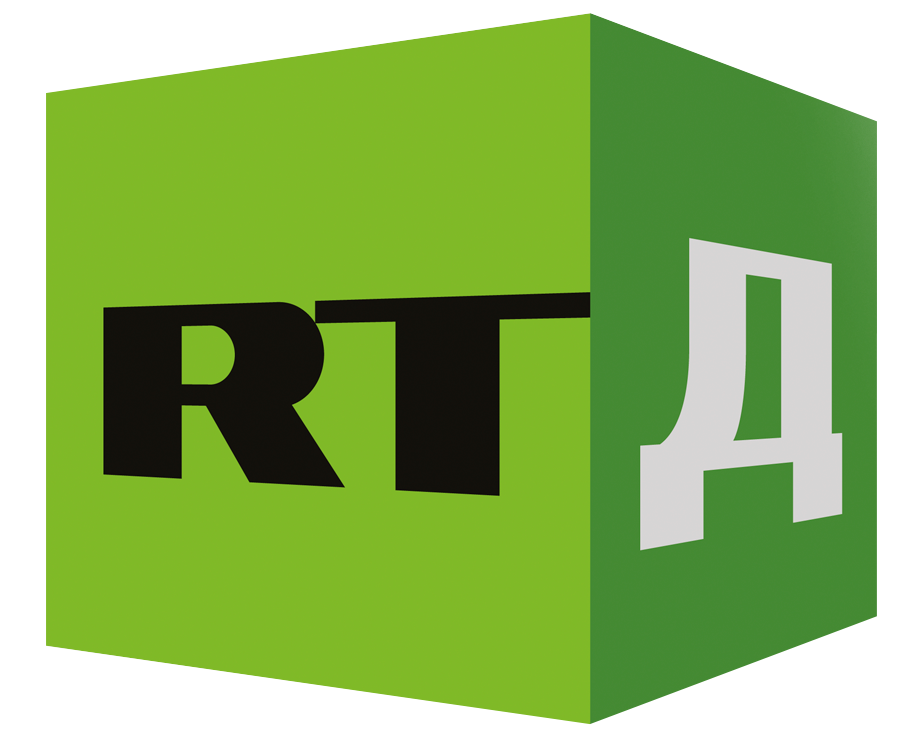
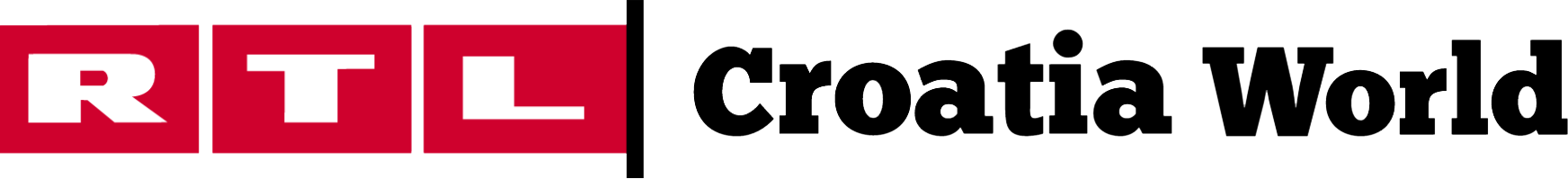
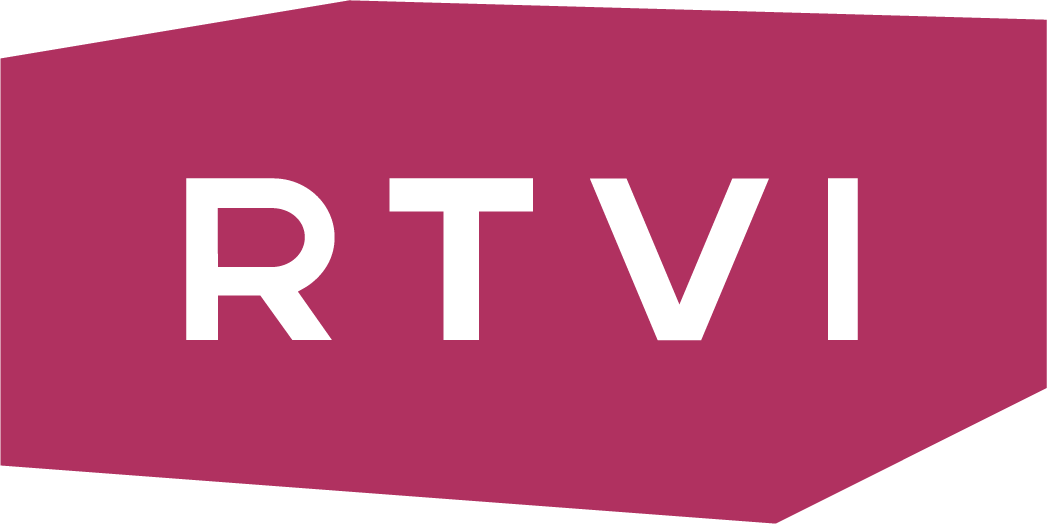
Logo	Channel Name	Owners	Channel Type
	Rai Italia	RAI	Lifestyle
	Raj TV		Lifestyle
	RCN Nuestra Tele	RCN Televisión	Lifestyle
	Real Madrid TV	Real Madrid Club de Fútbol	Sports
	ROCK Action	Rock Entertainment Holdings	Premium Films and Content
	ROCK Entertainment	Rock Entertainment Holdings	Lifestyle
	RT Documentary	ANO TV-Novosti	Documentaries
	RT News	ANO TV-Novosti	News and Current Events
	RTB Sukmaindera	RTB	Lifestyle
	RTL Croatia World	RTL Hrvatska	Lifestyle
	RTM TV1	RTM	Lifestyle
	RTP Mundo	RTP	Lifestyle
	RTV		Lifestyle
	RTVI	Mikayal Israyel	Lifestyle
	Russia-24	VGTRK	News and Current Events

=== S ===
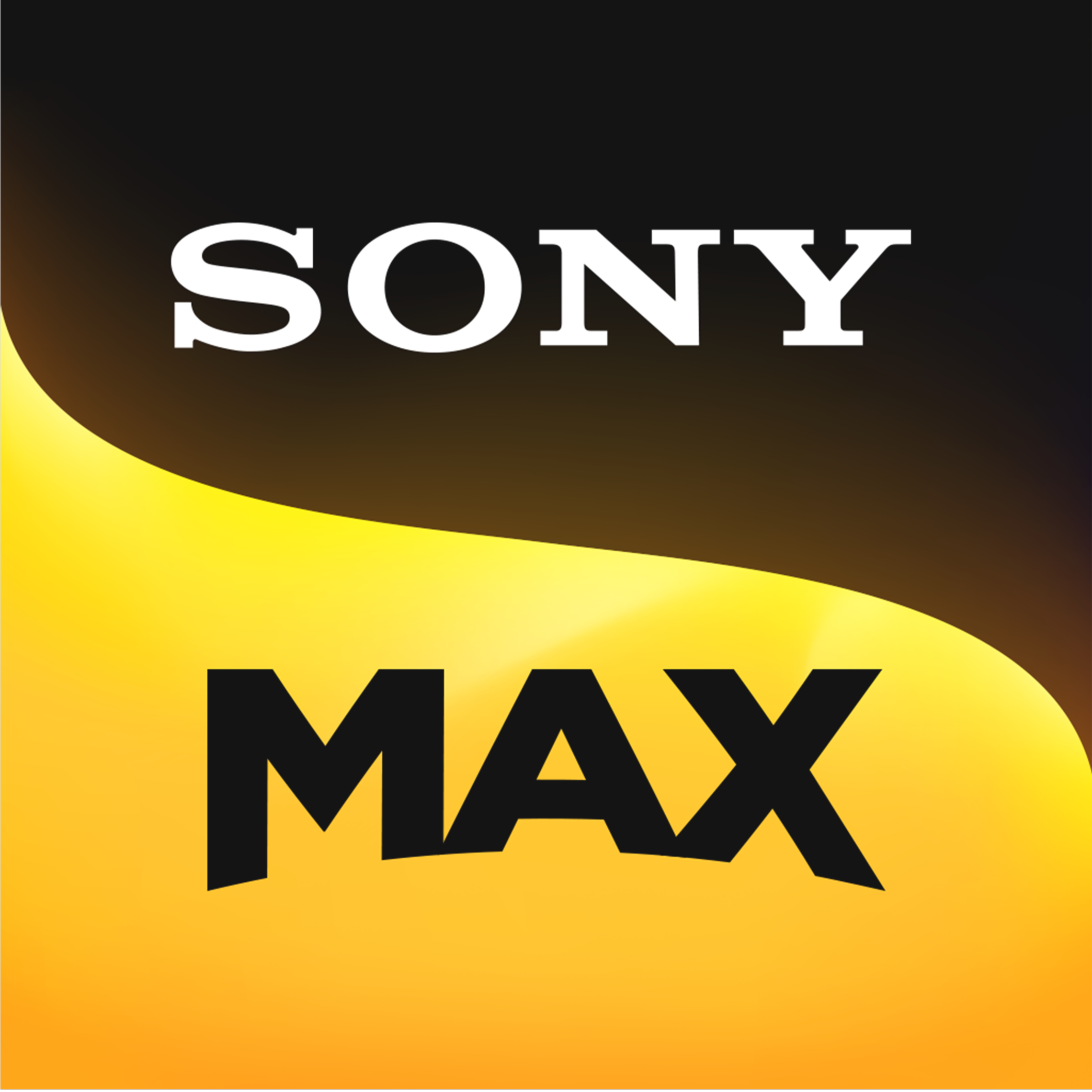
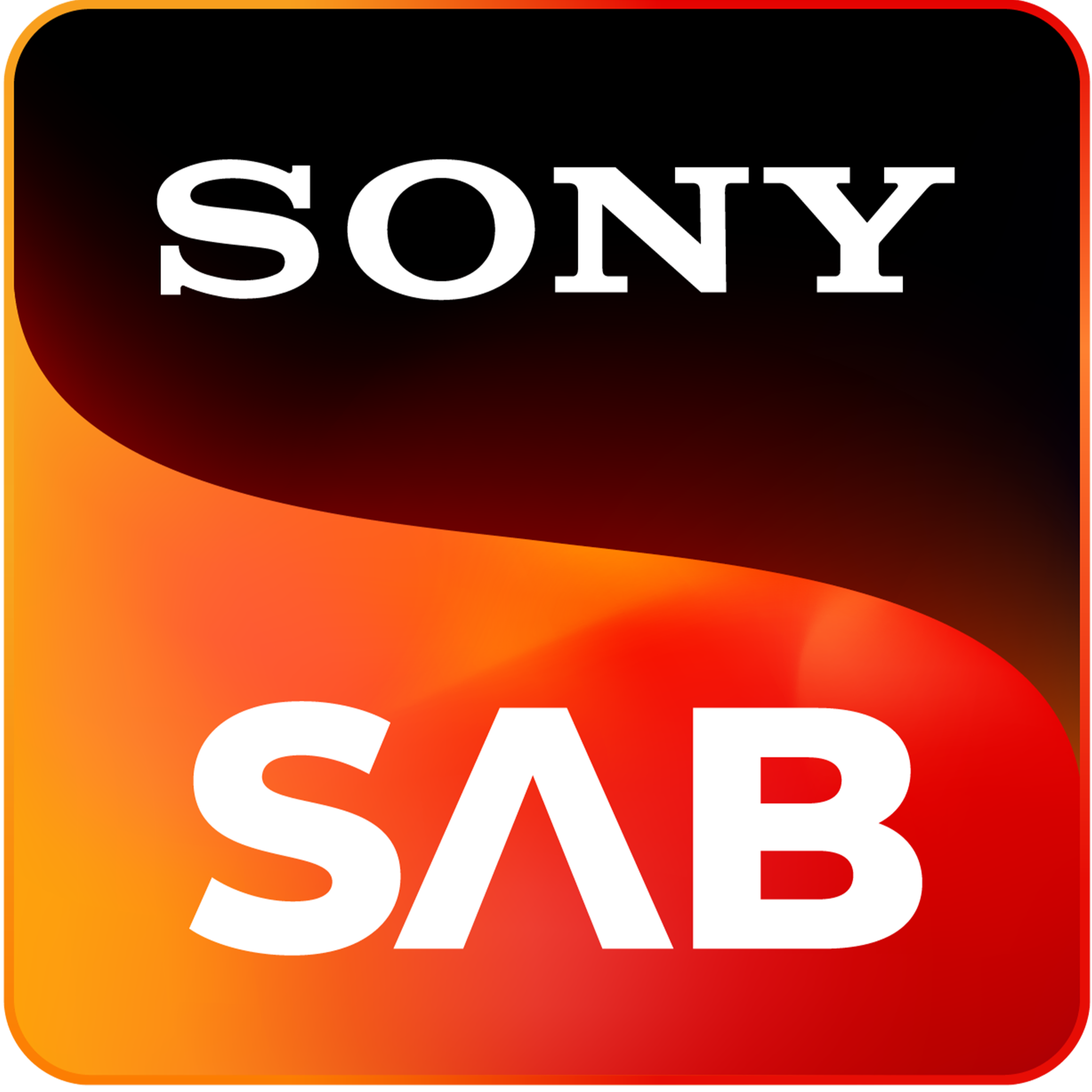
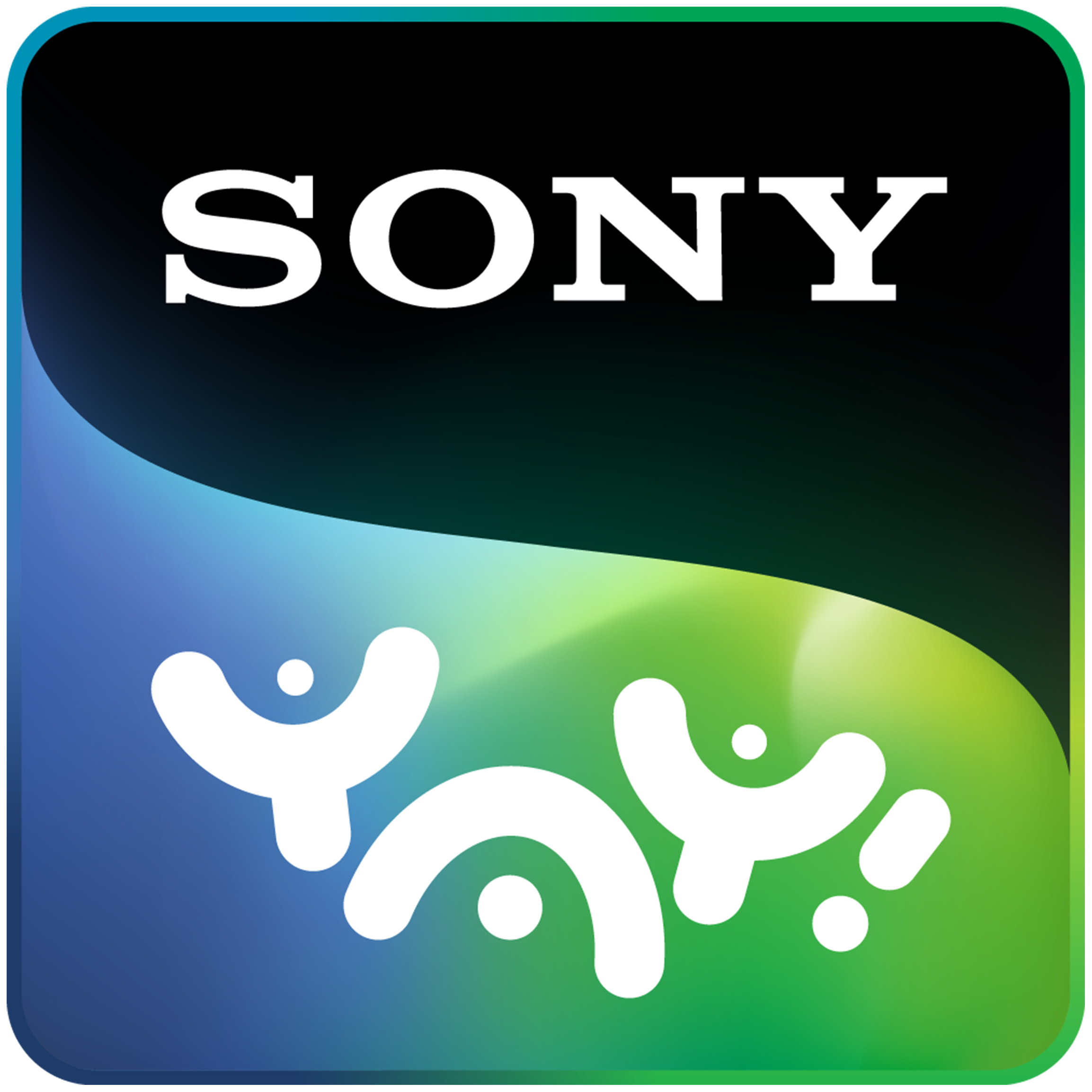
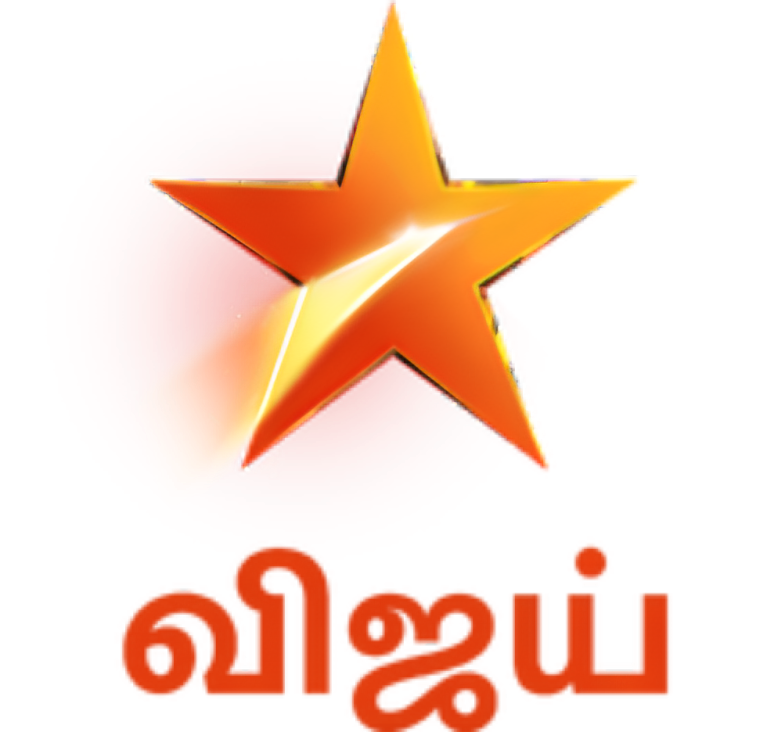
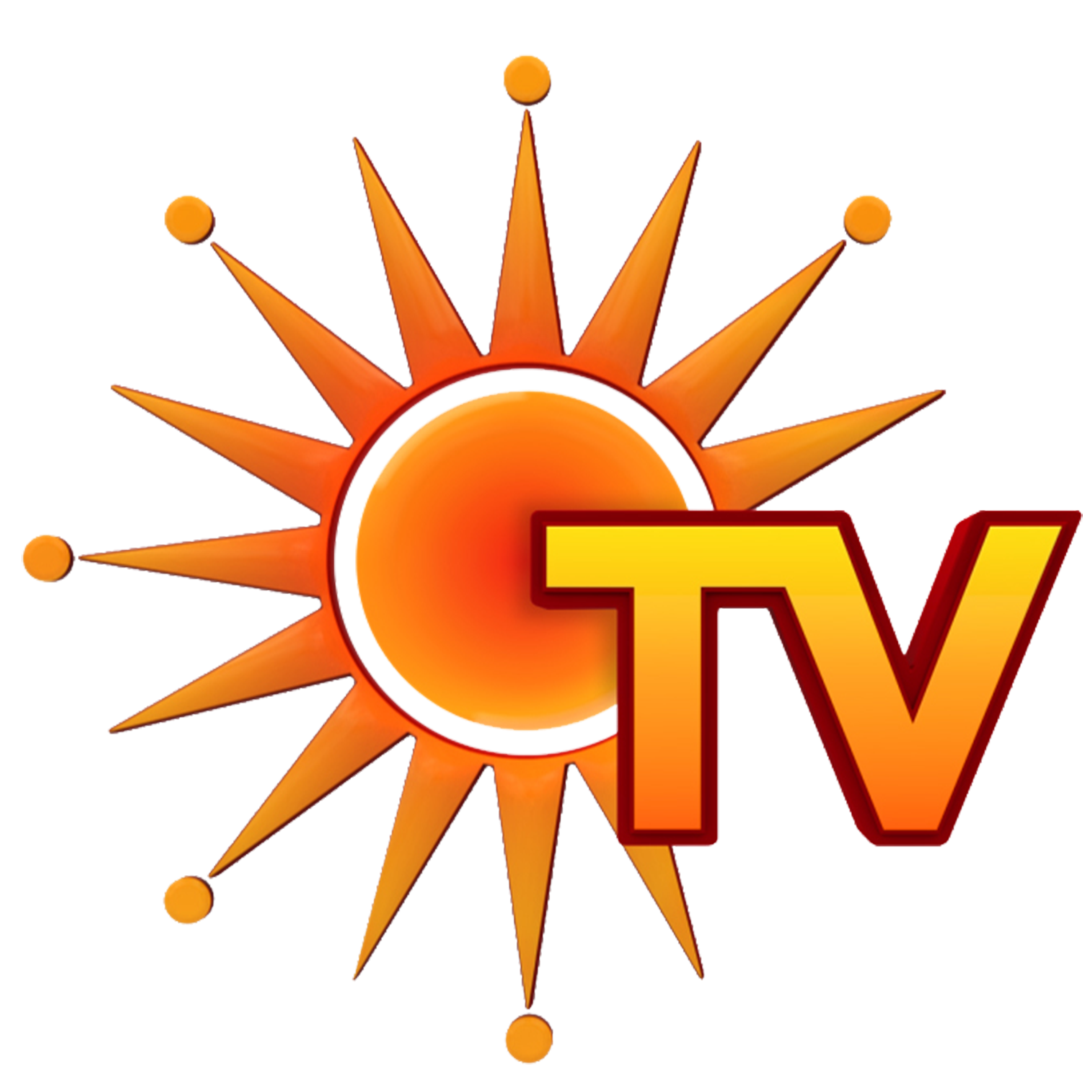
Logo	Channel Name	Owners	Channel Type
	Saudi TV	Saudi Broadcasting Authority	Lifestyle
	Sky News	Sky Group	News and Current Events
	Sony Entertainment Television	Sony Pictures Networks	Entertainment
	Sony Max	Sony Pictures Networks	Entertainment
	Sony Pix	Sony Pictures Networks	Entertainment
	Sony SAB	Sony Pictures Networks	Entertainment
	Sony Sports Ten 1	Sony Pictures Networks	Sports and Live Events
	Sony Sports Ten 2	Sony Pictures Networks	Sports and Live Events
	Sony Sports Ten 5	Sony Pictures Networks	Sports and Live Events
	Sony YAY!	Sony Pictures Networks	Children’s programming
	SPOTV	Eclat Media Group	Sports and Live Events
	SPOTV2	Eclat Media Group	Sports and Live Events
	Star Bharat	JioStar	Entertainment
	StarPlus	JioStar	Entertainment
	Star TVE	RTVE	Entertainment
	Star Vijay	JioStar	Entertainment
	Stingray Classica	Stingray Group	Music programming
	Stingray CMusic	Stingray Group	Music programming
	Sun TV	Sun TV Network	Entertainment
	Supreme Master Television		Religious

=== T ===
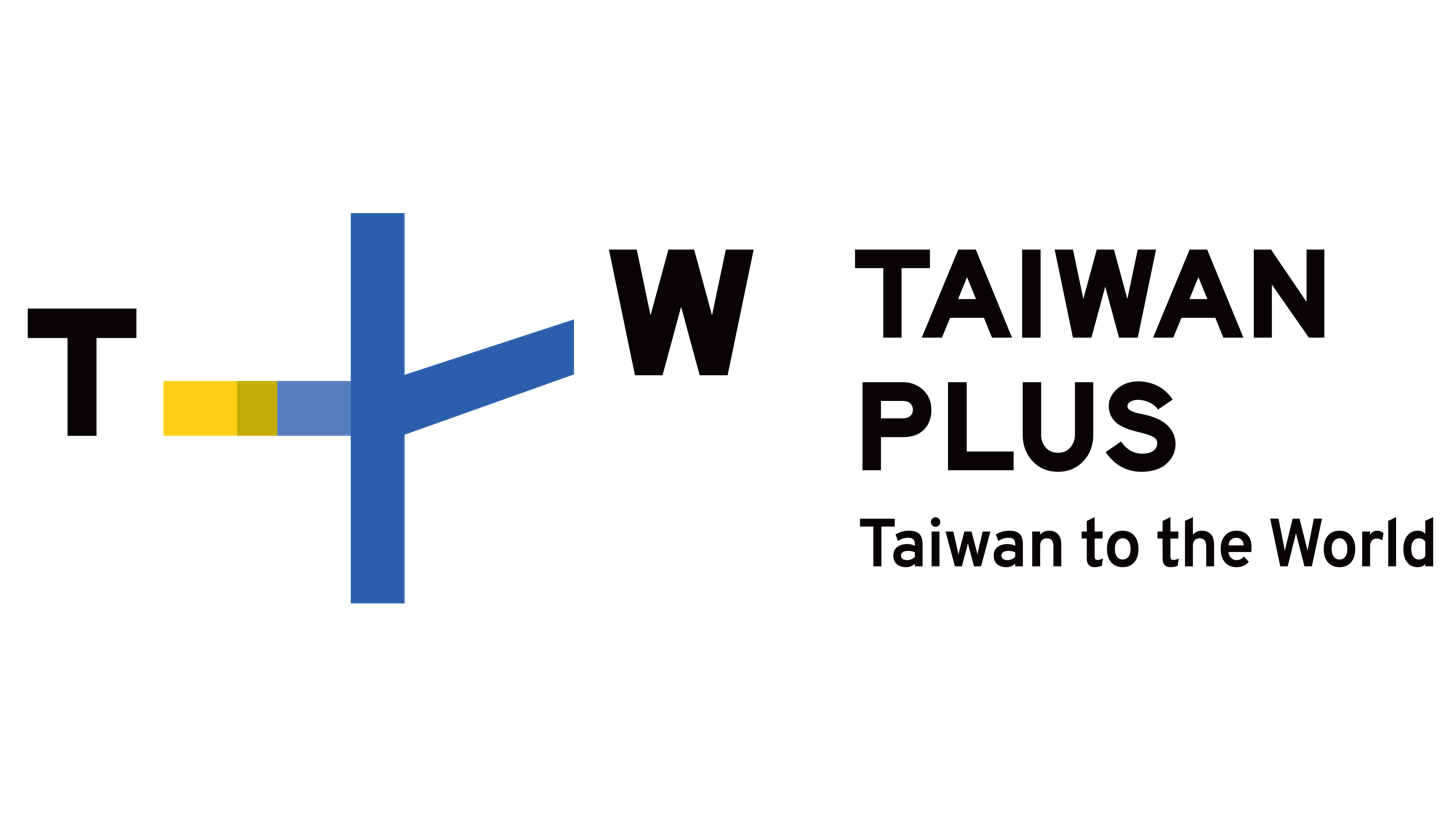
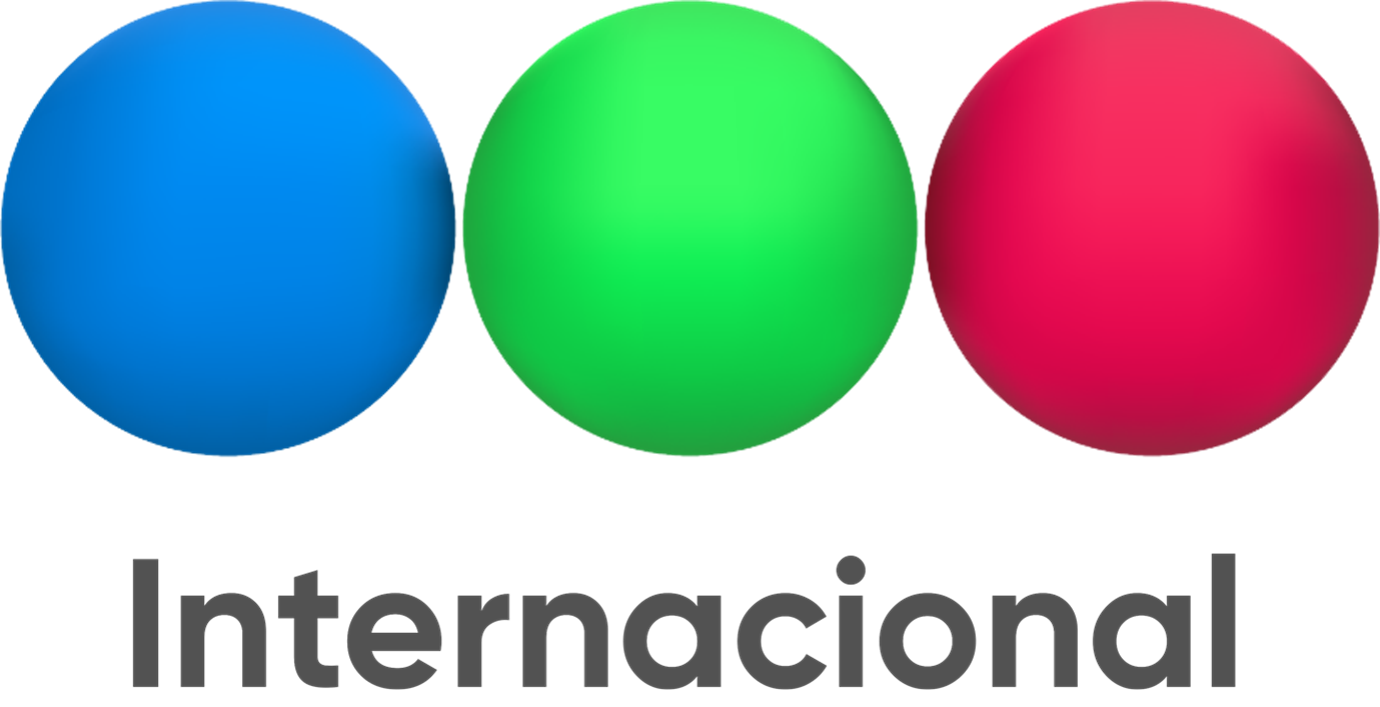
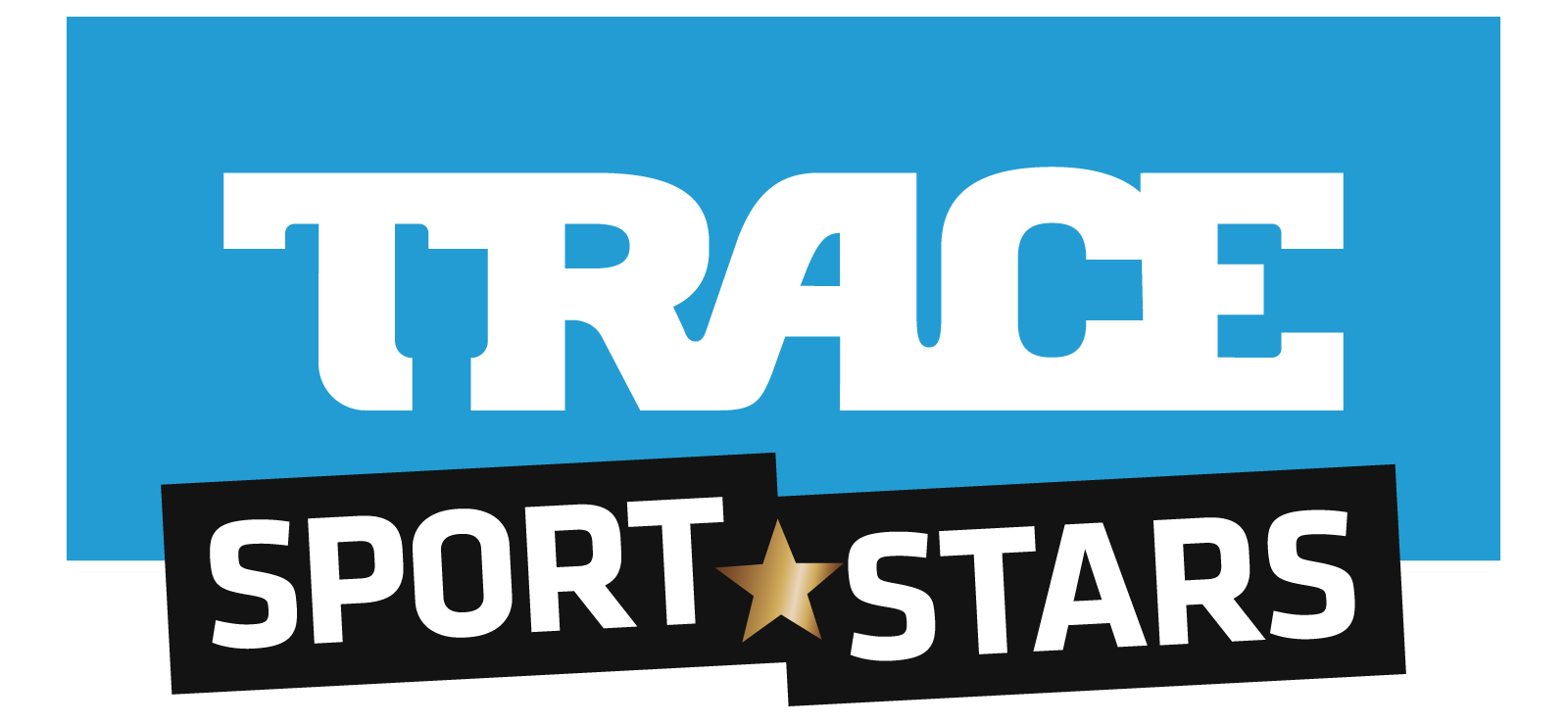
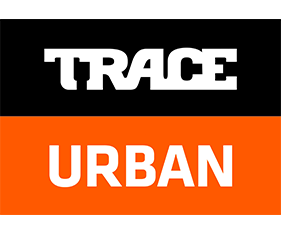
Logo	Channel Name	Owners	Channel Type
	TaiwanPlus	PTS	News and Current Events
	TBN	Trinity Broadcasting Network	Religious
	Telefe Internacional	Telefe	Entertainment
	Telemundo Internacional	NBCUniversal	Entertainment
	TFC	ABS-CBN Corporation	Lifestyle
	Thrill	Celestial Tiger Entertainment	Lifestyle
	Times Now	The Times Group	News and Current Events
	TLC	Skydance	Lifestyle
	Trace Sport Stars	TPG Capital	Lifestyle
	Trace Urban	TPG Capital	Music programming
	Travel Channel	Skydance	Documentaries
	Travelxp	Celebrities Management Private Limited	Lifestyle
	TRT Arabi	TRT	News and Current Events
	TRT World	TRT	News and Current Events
	TV5Monde	France Télévisions	Lifestyle
	TVB Jade	TVB	Lifestyle
	TVBS Asia	TVBS Media	Lifestyle
	TV Chile	Televisión Nacional de Chile	Lifestyle
	TVE Internacional	RTVE	Lifestyle
	TV Globo Internacional	Roberto Irineu Marinho	Lifestyle
	TV Maldives	PSM	Lifestyle
	TVN Asia	CJ ENM HK	Lifestyle
	TVP World	Telewizja Polska	News and Current Events
	TVRI World	LPP TVRI	News and Current Events

=== U ===
Logo	Channel Name	Owners	Channel Type
	UNTV	PBC	Religious

=== V ===
Logo	Channel Name	Owners	Channel Type
	Vatican Media	Holy See	Religious
	Vietnam Today	VTV	News and Current Events
	VTV1	VTV	News and Current Events
	VTV4	VTV	News and Current Events

=== W ===
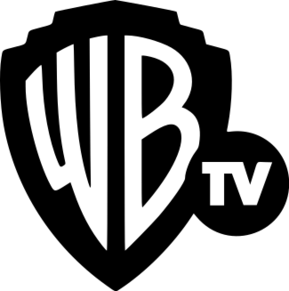
Logo	Channel Name	Owners	Channel Type
	Warner TV	Skydance	Premium Films and Content
	WION	Essel Group	News and Current Events

=== Y ===
Logo	Channel Name	Owners	Channel Type
	YTN		News and Current Events
	Yunnan TV1	Yunnan Television	Lifestyle

=== Z ===
Logo	Channel Name	Owners	Channel Type
	Zee News	Essel Group	News and Current Events
	Zee Tamil	Zee Entertainment Enterprises	Entertainment
	Zee TV	Zee Entertainment Enterprises	Entertainment
	Zhejiang TV	Zhejiang Radio and Television Group	Entertainment
	ZooMoo	Rock Entertainment Holdings	Children’s programming

== TrueVisions ==
=== TrueVisions Homemade channels ===
- TNN16 (HD)
- True4U
- True Asian More
- True Explore Wild
- True Explore Sci
- Foodiez Channel
- True Film 1
- True Film 2
- True Film Asia
- True Movie Hits
- True Plook Panya
- True Premier Football
- True Soul Siam
- True Spark Play
- True Tennis
- True Sports 1
- True Sports 2
- True Sports 3
- True Sports 4
- True Sports 5
- True Sports 7
- True Thai Film
- True X-Zyte
- TNN2

=== Channels provided by TrueVisions ===
- Rock X Stream
- iQIYI
- KBS World
- TVN Asia
- Celestial Classic Movies
- AXN
- Rock Entertainment
- Rock Action
- Fashion TV
- Arirang TV
- DW English
- BBC Lifestyle
- Nick Jr.
- DreamWorks
- Cartoon Network
- Discovery Asia
- History
- Discovery Channel
- Bein Sports 1
- Bein Sports 2
- Bein Sports 3
- Golf Plus Thailand
- SPOTV
- SPOTV2
- CNN
- Phoenix InfoNews
- BBC News
- CNBC Asia
- CCTV 4 Asia
- NHK World Premium
- TV5Monde Asie
- Al Jazeera English
- ABC Australia
- NHK World Japan
- CGTN
- RT News

== Defunct channels provided by TrueVisions ==
- Animax
- Star World
- Channel M
- Channel V Thailand
- MTV Thailand
- MUTV
- ASN
- BBC Knowledge
- Discovery Kids
- Fashion One
- CBeebies
- Discovery Science
- Eve
- DMAX Asia
- National Geographic SD
- HBO
- HBO Hits
- HBO Family
- HBO Signature
- Red by HBO
- Cinemax
- Stingray iConcerts
- BBC Entertainment
- Sports Illustrated
- TCM
- Sony Channel
- AMC
- E! Entertainment
- DIVA Universal
- Bloomberg Television
- Disney XD
- Thaithai Channel
- Disney Channel
- Disney Junior
- FOX Action Movies
- FOX Family Movies
- FOX Movies
- FOX Thai
- H2
- Rock Extreme
- DW Germany
- National Geographic HD
- True Chinese More
- True Korean More
- True Spark Jump
- True Inside
- TVN Asia (2023-2026)
- YTN
- True Music
- Paramount Network
- Outdoor Channel
- Motorvision Plus
- TVB Xing He
- Nickelodeon
- BBC Earth
- Love Nature
- Asian Food Network
- Animal Planet
- Food Network
- Warner TV
- TLC
- True Series
- Lifetime
- Crime & Investigation Network

== Defunct channels provided by Good TV ==
- FX
- Baby TV
- FOX Crime
- FOX Family Movies
- FOX
- FOX Life
- Nat Geo Wild
- Star Chinese Movies
- France 24 Français
- CNA
- TV5 Monde Asie
- CGTN
- FOX Thai
- Star World
- Zee Nung
- T Sports
- 3 Family
- Spring News
- Voice TV
- 3 SD
- CH2
- Spring 26
- Euronews English
- Mono Plus
- Toonami
- CGTN Documentary
- CCTV 4
- TGN
- Media 84
- CAT Channel
- Sabaidee TV
- M Channel
- FAN TV
- YOU Channel
- Miracle Channel
- Money Channel
- MVTV
- WSM TV
- Five Channel
- ETV
- Ploen TV
- Khongdee Thailand
- Sweet Music
- Hero
- Boomerang
- France 24 English
- NHK World Japan

== Defunct television networks ==
=== Terrestrial television ===
==== Analog networks ====
- Television of Thailand (later NBT since 2008)
- HSATV Channel 7 (later TV5 since 1974)
- TTV Channel 4 (later to TTV Channel 9 since 1970, M.C.O.T. Channel 9 in 1977 and Modernine TV in 2002 to 2015)
- Channel 3 (BEC-Bangkok Entertainment Company, under license from MCOT) (Defunct in 2020, Now all program was forced to move on 3 HD)
- ITV (Thailand) (Later TITV in 2007 and TPBS in 2008 (Now renamed as ThaiPBS))

==== Digital channels ====
- ALTV
- Channel 3 Family
- MCOT Family
- Loca
- Thai TV 17
- Channel 18
- Spring News
- Bright TV 20
- Voice TV 21
- Spring 26
- Channel 3 SD

=== Cable and satellite television ===
- Pop TV
- Thai Chaiyo
- One Variety
- Miracle
- EARTH
- Voice TV
- ASTV
- Peace TV
- Channel 6
- T Channel
- Sabaidee TV 141
- MVTV Family
- TGN
- MCOT World
- MCOT1
- Thai Channel 2
- JKN TV 86
- O Shopping 43
- Dara Daily TV
- T Sports Channel
- Cartoon Club 76
- True Shopping 41
- True Inside
- True Music
- True Spark Jump
- True Hay Ha
- True Korean More
- True Chinese More
- True Series
- Mix Major Channel
- Dailynews TV
- TV24
- Money Channel
- Ja Ting Ja TV
- Fahwanmai
- Gang Cartoon
- Toon Channel
- Plaen TV
- GTH On Air
- ACTS Channel
- FAN TV
- EDN Edutainment Network
- Sat Variety 143
- Channel V Thailand
- MTV Thailand
- Bang Channel
- Thai Thai Channel
- Krungthepturakij TV
- TV Pool Music Channel
- PSI Saradee 99
- Kasikorn TV
- Thai Visions Channel
- WSM TV
- T Variety 38
- tvN Thai
- Media 84
- Media Boom
- Media News Channel
- IN Channel
- TV Muslim Thailand
- Aonzon TV
- DMC
- Live Sky 1
- Sport 2
- Toon Toon
- Movie & sat Asia
- Simon TV
- IPM Kids Song
- IPM AniPlus
- IPM View World
- 13 Siam Thai
- SEXY Channel
- Morden India TV
- JJ Channel
- Maxagro TV
- Pramarn Channel
- CAT Channel
- Box Film
- Sanook TV V2H3
- Boonjan Pannee TV 123
- TCNN 47
- Chic Station 80
- Maya Hot News
- 88 Good Luck TV
- Chomyut Channel
- Eakkaluk Thai TV
- Ihealthi
- Police TV 203
- Mee Khun TV 79
- Bangkok Channel
- Maya Star TV 47
- Kuru TV
- V Like Channel
- ATTV 92
- Doonee TV 90
- Chokdee TV
- MGTV
- Thai-China International TV
- Health & Family
- Thai Asean News Network
- Fram Channel
- You2Play TV
- The China Business Network
- Mono Plus 77
- D Channel
- Speed Channel
- Siamsport News
- Siamsport Football
- Siamsport Live
- T News TV
- WBTV
- Green Channel
- Bangkok City Channel
- RSU Wisdom TV
- Grand Prix Channel
- The Living Show
- Hot TV
- Spring News
- MVTV6 V2H28
- TV Direct 1-10
- TVD MOMO 1-4
- DDTV
- RU TV
- TOONEE
- M Channel 88
- Thai CCTV
- TNT Thailand
- Hit Station
- Super Star 106
- True Plook Panya 248
- Play Channel
- Mirror Channel
- Aktion 103
- PB Channel 53
- Star TV Thailand
- Me TV 91
- 1618 SHOP
- Star K 104
- Sheikhul Islam TV V2H23
- Chalerm Krung TV
- Mongkol Channel
- Wisdom TV 109
- S Channel Beauty Station 110
- Lamkong Channel 115
- MCU TV 227
- Metro TV Bangkok
- Goodfilms
- Panyapiwat TV
- NASA TV
- 40-50 Channel
- SBT TV
- Cool Channel 82
- R Film 57
- Unity TV 54
- Nation Channel
- Media Online V2H10
- Wish Channel 68
- Happy TV V2H5
- TVB Thai
- Topline TV 78
- Zee Nung
- IN TV 63
- Neramit Channel 109
- ASEAN TV
- H Plus Channel
- Thai Teacher TV
- Shop & Show
- Doonee TV
- Maruay TV 116
- Dara Daily
- Maya Channel
- RS Mall Channel
- Movie Hits 160
- Gen C TV 162
- CAT Channel
- Yunnan Lancang-Mekong International 173
- TV Market 132
- Living Mall 133
- Kaset Num Thai 135
- Kaset TV HD 136
- Kaset News 72
- Sat Variety
- Miti 4
- 2 Tango
- Click Asia
- Giffarine Channel
- Fame
- Dude TV
- Jewelry Channel 152
- Tiger Shopping 85
- Asian Movie 101
- Bangkok Thonburi Channel
- Zaa Network
- JKN Hi Shopping
- GMM Music
- Five Channel
- WOW Shopping
- MVTV Series
- Esan TV
- SMM TV
- NBT TV Khonkaen
- NBT TV Ubon Ratchathani
- NBT TV Chiang Mai
- NBT TV Phitsanulok
- NBT TV Surat Thani
- Dr TV
- NBT TV Kanchanaburi
- NBT TV Nakhon Si Thammarat
- NBT TV Phuket
- NBT TV Yala
- NBT World

== See also ==
- Media of Thailand
