= ALTV =

Thai educational television channel

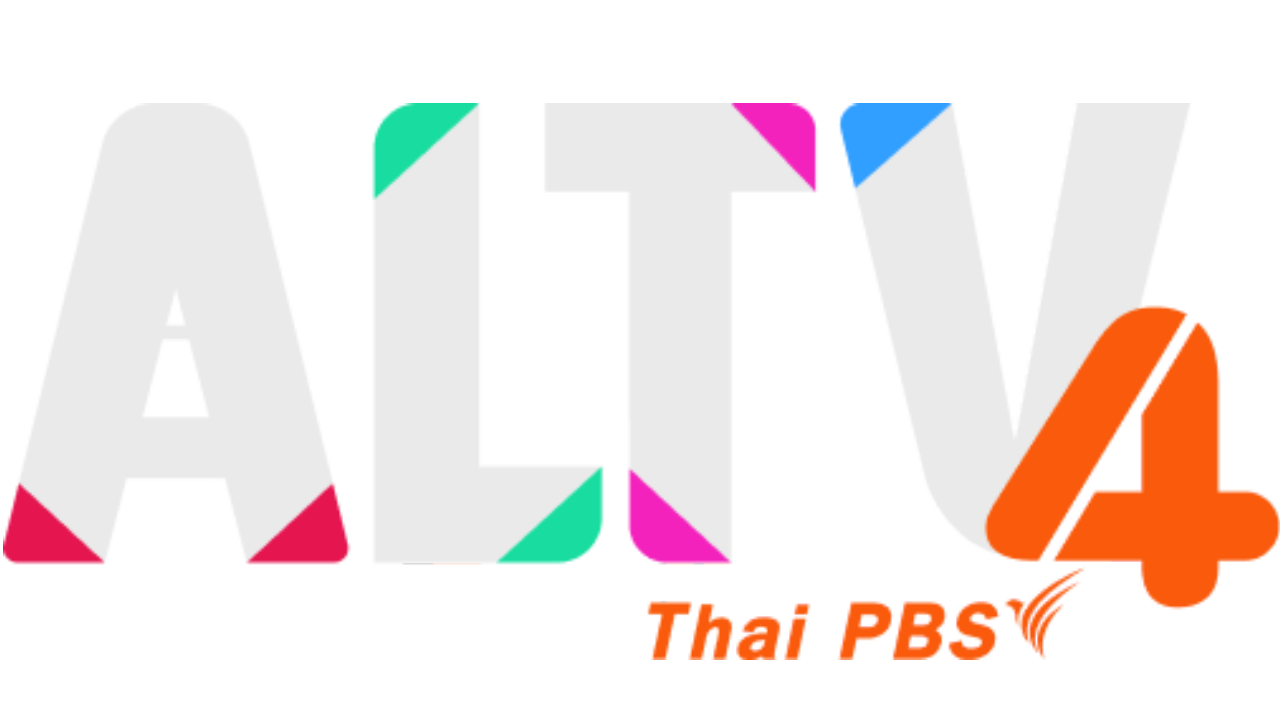
- Country: Thailand
- Broadcast area: Thailand

Programming
- Language: Thai
- Picture format: 576i (16:9 SDTV)

Ownership
- Owner: Thai Public Broadcasting Service
- Sister channels: Thai PBS

History
- Launched: 1 July 2020; 6 years ago
- Closed: 1 January 2026; 10 months ago

Links
- Webcast: https://www.altv.tv/live
- Website: www.altv.tv

Availability

Terrestrial
- Digital: Channel 4 (TPBS – MUX4)

ALTV (Active Learning Television) was a Thai educational television channel operated by Thai PBS, which strives to promote learning and the integration of teaching between home and school.

In May 2020, Thai PBS submitted a proposal to the National Broadcasting and Telecommunications Commission to operate a new educational digital television channel. Thai PBS was initially granted to temporarily operate a new digital TV channel for 6 months, in which ALTV launched on 1 July 2020 in digital, satellite television and online platforms.

Thai PBS announced that ALTV would stop broadcasting, and its content would be moved to the main Thai PBS channel and its online platforms from January 2026.

== Programming themes ==
ALTV broadcasts educational television programs for viewers of all ages, which are classified into 6 categories.

- Active Learning News : Learning news program
- Homeroom Home-Run : Life and education guidance program
- Smart Classroom : Interactive learning for specific skill
- Farm Roo : Learning through outdoor activities
- Tutor Hub : Re-skill & Partnership relation
- Knowledge Pool : Documentary & Edutainment for practical experience

== See also ==
- Thai PBS
- List of television stations in Thailand
- Media of Thailand
