= Mono Plus =

Mono29 Plus
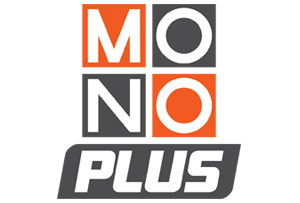
- Country: Thailand
- Broadcast area: Thailand (via DVB-T2)
- Headquarters: Bangkok, Thailand

Programming
- Language: Thai
- Picture format: 576i (SDTV) 16:9

Ownership
- Owner: MONO Next
- Sister channels: MONOMAX Sports; MONO Max

Availability

Streaming media
- Official Website: Watch live (HD)
- 3BB Giga TV: 109
- AIS Play: 108

Mono Plus is an online streaming and former satellite television channel in Thailand owned by MONO Next, a media and technology giant in Thailand.

== History ==
Mono Plus provides a wide range of content in its Movie Plus, Music Plus and Series Plus strands which are transmitted seven days per week via cable, terrestrial, satellite and IPTV networks.

The sister TV channel of Mono Next, Mono Plus transmits a wide range of alternative content composed of both Thai and foreign movies and series, variety shows and live sports such as basketball, sepak takraw (kick volleyball) and online game competitions.
