= English Club TV =

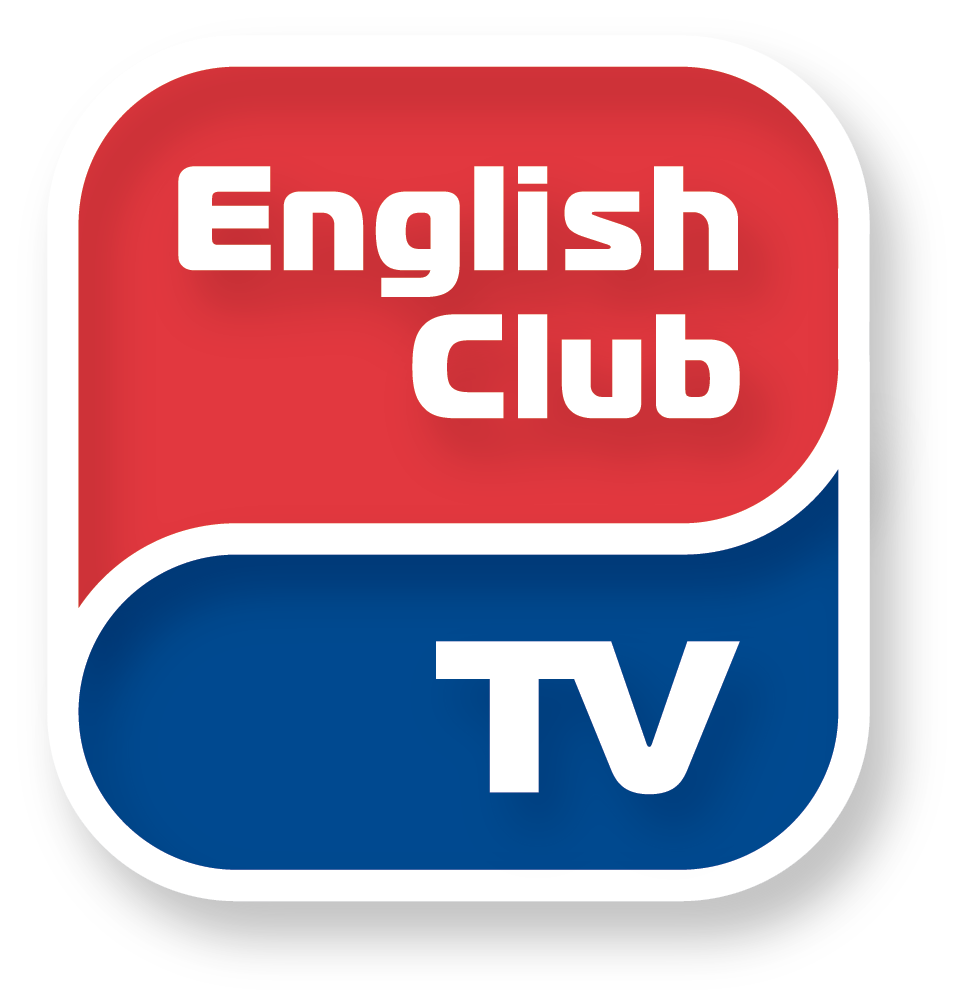
- Type: Educational television channel
- Country: Ukraine; United Kingdom
- Headquarters: Dnipro, Ukraine

Programming
- Picture format: HDTV 1080i

Ownership
- Owner: Oleg Naumov
- Key people: Andrii Semchenko (CEO)

History
- Launched: August 2008

Links
- Website: www.english-club.tv

English Club TV is a British-Ukrainian educational television channel dedicated to teaching the English language. It first started broadcasting in August 2008. The author of the idea was the owner and general producer of the TV channel Oleg Naumov, a TV personality from Dnipro, where the Ukrainian division of English Club TV operates.

== Programming ==
Program content consists of documentaries, feature films, cartoons and music videos, which are adapted for learning English. The program schedule is divided into blocks that correspond to different levels and age groups.

After the launch of Da Vinci Ukraine in 2009, the interests of this TV channel in Ukraine became represented by the British company "English Club TV".

== History ==
In August 2008, British TV channel English Club began broadcasting from the Sirius 4 satellite.

In January 2009, an agreement was signed with Universal Communications to distribute the channel in Russia and Kazakhstan. In January 2010, the channel began broadcasting in Russia/CIS countries. In September 2011 broadcasting began in Central and Western Europe. In May 2012 the On-the-Go service launched. In November 2012 broadcasting in Asia and Africa began. In January 2013 an HD version launched; and in June 2013, broadcasting in North and Latin America began.

The channel made co-operation agreements in 2012 with English leaning houses such as International House and the British Council, especially in the children's demographic. With Macmillan Education, they launched the educational reality series E-Lab. In September 2012 the channel was added to Viasat Ukraine.

On June 16, 2022, the channel ceased broadcasting in Russia due to the ongoing Russo-Ukrainian war. Instead, a similar channel called English Class HD was offered to the Russian viewers on the same frequency as the original English Club TV.

The Ukrainian regulator registered the Ukrainian broadcasting license of English Club TV on 31 October 2023, alongside Warner Bros. Discovery's DTX.
