= Spring News =

Thai television news channel

Spring News สปริงนิวส์
- Country: Thailand
- Broadcast area: Thailand; Malaysia (Perlis, Kedah, Perak, Kelantan); Myanmar (areas of Tachileik, Myawaddy, parts of Mawlamyine, and southernmost part of Tanintharyi Region); Cambodia (border areas of Oddar Meanchey, Banteay Meanchey, Pailin, parts of Battambang and Koh Kong provinces); Mekong river areas in Laos (including Vientiane); Vietnam
- Headquarters: LPN Tower; Vibhavadi Rangsit Road, Chomphon Sub-District Chatuchak District Bangkok, Thailand

Programming
- Languages: Thai, English
- Picture format: 576i (SDTV) 16:9

Ownership
- Owner: Nation Group (Thailand) PCL./Spring News Television Ltd.
- Parent: News Network Corporation PCL
- Sister channels: NationTV

History
- Launched: 5 March 2010
- Closed: 15 August 2019 (9 years, 163 days)
- Replaced by: Spring News Online
- Former names: Now26 (2014–2019); Spring 2019 (1 March–15 August 2019)

Links
- Website: www.springnews.co.th

Availability

Terrestrial
- Digital: Channel 19 (MCOT - MUX3)

Spring News (Thai: สปริงนิวส์) was a Thai Television news channel owned by Spring News Television Ltd., part of News Network Corporation PCL. (formerly Solution Corner 1998 PCL.).

== History ==
Spring News was formed on February 26th 2010. The station debuted later on satellite television via test broadcast on March 5th 2010. The official launch of Spring News was on December 15th 2010 at the Renaissance Bangkok Ratchaprasong Hotel. During the test broadcast, Spring News broadcast from 9:00 AM to 12:00 AM. Later on, Spring News changed the broadcast to a 24-hour news station.

After Spring News had successfully launched their Satellite Television Station, the station moved their headquarters to a new location in December 15th 2010. They also changed the programming schedule on February 1st 2011. In mid-2011, every news section started to use the slogan "ข่าวจริง สปริงนิวส์" (Real news Spring News), adding the program time in the news title.

Spring News won the licence for Digital television for news and information channel from the NBTC's spectrum auction in 2013. Spring News started broadcasting on Digital Television from 1 April 2014 on LCN Channel 19.

== Partnership with CNN ==
On 24 November 2016, Spring News signed a partnership deal with international news network CNN for using content, news footage and training for employees. On 1 January 2017, Spring News began using CNN-themed on-screen graphics.

== Partnership with TVD and Later Fate ==
Around the same time in 2018, Spring News released their new programming schedule. Spring News changed from a TV station to a news producer for broadcasting on Spring News Digital Ch.19 and Spring 26 (NOW26 during that time period) and NationTV Ch.22 in the Trademark Spring News Network (Thai: สปริงนิวส์ เน็ตเวิร์ค)

Later on in September of 2018, TVDirect (TVD) purchased 90.10% of Spring News' shares. Later on in February 26th, TVD backed out from the purchase because the NBTC prepared to release assistance measures for digital TV operators.

Spring News Channel ceased its broadcasting on August 15, 2019 due to financial reasons. However, Spring News continues to operate, reporting news and articles online as a part of the Nation Group.

Before the station completely ceased the broadcasting, The station played a teaser for Spring News Online, teasing their move to digital.

== Programming ==
- Spring News broadcast 24-hour rolling news coverage throughout the day called "The Phenomenon of Real News" (ปรากฎการณ์ข่าวจริง) excepting variety programming and infotainment program available on weekends. Rolling news started at 6 am (ICT) with One Minute News Updates every top of the hour and every half-hour.
- เช้าข่าวจริง
- ข่าวเกษตร Spring News

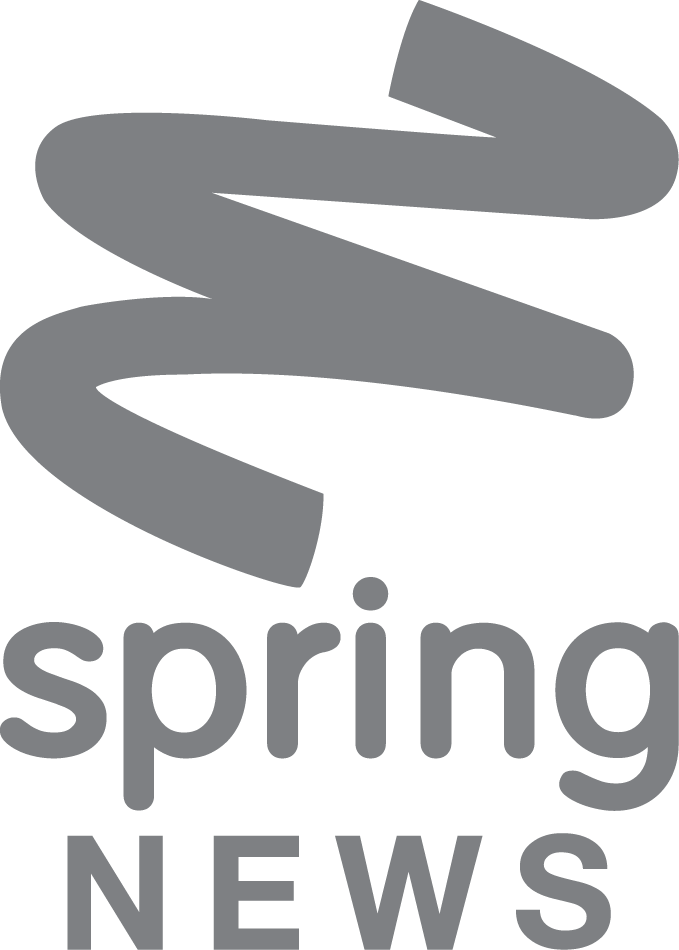
Spring News 2013 Logo

=== Non-news live programming ===
- Live Telecast of Thai lottery draw every 1st and 16th of every month at 14:30–16:00 (ICT) (simulcast Second and last hour with National Broadcasting Services of Thailand)

=== Affiliate programming ===
From CNN International:

- Anderson Cooper 360°
- Quest Means Business
- Amanpour
- Hollywood Express
- The Silk Road
- CNN Styles
