= LRT =

LRT may stand for:

== Television and radio broadcasting ==
- Lithuanian National Radio and Television, public broadcasting company of Lithuania
  - LRT Klasika, a Lithuanian radio channel
  - LRT Lituanica, a Lithuanian public television channel
  - LRT Plius, a Lithuanian television station
  - LRT Radijas, a Lithuanian radio station
  - LRT televizija, a Lithuanian television station
- Latgale Regional Television (Latgales reģionālā televīzija), television broadcaster and content producer in Latgale, Latvia, includes LRT+.

== Transportation ==
- Light rail transit, a type of higher capacity, higher speed tram (shortened to LRT in Canada)
  - Edmonton LRT, in Edmonton, Canada
  - Light Rail (MTR), in Hong Kong
- Light rapid transit, a type of rapid transit system; often called a "medium-capacity rail system" or "light metro"
  - Ui LRT, in Greater Seoul, South Korea
  - Manila Light Rail Transit System, in Manila, Philippines
  - Jabodebek LRT, in Greater Jakarta, Indonesia
  - Jakarta LRT, in Jakarta, Indonesia
  - Palembang LRT, on Sumatra, Indonesia
- Light Rail Transit (Singapore), a type of people mover system; feeder lines to the Singapore Mass Rapid Transit (MRT)
- Lion Rock Tunnel, a transport tunnel part of Route 1 in Hong Kong
- London Regional Transport, the public transport network in Greater London, UK, 1984–2000
- Lorient South Brittany Airport, which has the IATA code LRT
- Louis Riel Trail, a highway in Saskatchewan, Canada

== Other ==
- Likelihood-ratio test, a method for comparing statistical models
- Little Round Top, a hill at Gettysburg, Pennsylvania
