= Make It Right 2026 =

- Genre: Boys' love; Drama; Romance
- Written by: Kwang Latika Chumpoo
- Directed by: Cheewin Thanamin Wongskulphat
- Starring: Boongkee Surasee Manoonpanich; Prommy Poonyawee Suwanvaree; Shane Thanatpong Thaveesapmanee; PeemKrit Krittapas Panitpongsathorn; Putter Theerath Ruangkraiwattanachok; Eugene Phittiphat Nanthachaiyaphon; Patrick Patchata Ongworawut; Che Sikorn Thanawong; Milan Nadech Nawantip; Bible Chattarwasu Chutimaphongsarat; Pennueng Pennueng Powanusorn; Tiger Peerapat Attakorn; Phim Pharanyu Chaiphum
- Country of origin: Thailand
- Original language: Thai
- No. of seasons: 1
- No. of episodes: 12

Production
- Running time: 54 minutes
- Production company: Copy A Bangkok

Original release
- Network: MCOT HD
- Release: July 17 – October 2, 2026

Make It Right 2026 (th:รักออกเดิน 2026) is a Thai boys' love television series produced by Copy A Bangkok. Directed by Cheewin Thanamin Wongskulphat and written by Kwang Latika Chumpoo, the series is a remake of Make It Right (2016).

Starring Boongkee Surasee Manoonpanich, Prommy Poonyawee Suwanvaree, Shane Thanatpong Thaveesapmanee and PeemKrit Krittapas Panitpongsathorn, the series premiered on 17 July 2026. It aired on Channel 9 MCOT HD and was simultaneously released on Viu.

== Synopsis ==
After experiencing heartbreak, Fuse grows closer to Tee, a quiet classmate who awakens unexpected feelings. As the two try to understand their emotions, other students also experience first love while facing challenges involving friendship, identity and growing up.

== Cast ==
=== Main ===
- Surasee Manoonpanich (Boongkee) as Fuse
- Poonyawee Suwanvaree (Prommy) as Tee
- Thanatpong Thaveesapmanee (Shane) as Frame
- Krittapas Panitpongsathorn (PeemKrit) as Book

=== Supporting ===
- Putter Theerath Ruangkraiwattanachok as Lukmo
- Eugene Phittiphat Nanthachaiyaphon as Yok
- Patrick Patchata Ongworawut as Rodtang
- Che Sikorn Thanawong as Nai
- Milan Nadech Nawantip as Est
- Bible Chattarwasu Chutimaphongsarat as Mek
- Pennueng Pennueng Powanusorn as Wit
- Tiger Peerapat Attakorn as Copter
- Phim Pharanyu Chaiphum as Champ

=== Guest appearances ===
- Jaja Primrata Dej-Udom
- Jeep Wasu Saengsingkaeo
- Natty Natthamon Jantraviphart
- Yeepun Purichaya Saranark
- Chacha Kanokrak Ngamlikitlert
- Krittapak Udompanich (Boom)
- Seoul Weeramethachai

== Soundtrack ==
Title	Performer(s)	Released	Ref.
ทฤษฎีความรัก (Theory of Love)	Peak Peemapol feat. Prommy, Boongkee, Shane and PeemKrit	15 July 2026	

== Production ==
The series was announced as a remake of Make It Right (2016), marking the tenth anniversary of the original production. The project features a new cast while retaining Cheewin Thanamin Wongskulphat, who directed the original series, as the director of the new adaptation. Filming began in 2026 under the production of Copy A Bangkok.
