= Television in Thailand =

In Thailand, television broadcasting started on 24 June 1955 (in NTSC). Color telecasts (PAL, System B/G 625 lines) were started in 1967, and full-time color transmissions were launched in 1975. As of November 2020, there are currently 21 digital (DVB-T2) TV channels in Thailand.

== History ==
Television was first officially introduced to Thailand on 24 June 1955 in NTSC. One of the first broadcasters of television were the Mass Communication Organization of Thailand, which was established on 10 November 1952. In the first few years, viewership was low before gradually climbing to 2000 in 1957. Later on in 1955, the Radio Communications Act, B.E. 2498 was passed.

Television had become the largest advertising medium in Thailand by 1959, with only two stations in Bangkok serving 35,000 television sets in a population of nine million. As of 1967, Thailand had the third highest number of television sets in Southeast Asia, with little more than 250,000 sets available. Color telecasts began in 1967, and full-time color transmissions started in 1975.

The introduction of digital terrestrial television quadrupled the number of available channels from six to 24, but due to a lack of local content on some of the new entrants, overseas programs filled the void.

== Television providers ==
Subscription providers are available, with differences in the number of channels, capabilities such as the program guide (EPG), video on demand (VOD), high-definition (HD), interactive television via the red button, and coverage across Thailand. Set-top boxes are generally used to receive these services.

Provider	Type of service	No. broadcast channels	VOD	HD	Red button	Still Operate?	Transmission
Digital terrestrial	Free-to-air	36 (Planned 48)	Yes	Yes	Yes	Yes	Digital terrestrial television
TrueVisions	Free and Pay TV	Around 200 (TV and radio)	Yes	Yes	Yes	Yes	Digital satellite, Cable television and IPTV
AIS Play	Free and Pay TV	Around 100	Yes	Yes	Yes	Yes	IPTV
GMM Z	Free (Previously include Pay TV)	Around 150	Yes	Yes	Yes	Yes	Digital satellite and IPTV
PSI	Free (Previously include Pay TV)	Around 150 (C-band)/100 (KU-band)	No	Yes	Yes	Yes	Digital satellite
IPM	Free	Around 100	No	Yes	Yes	No	Digital satellite
Good TV	Free and Pay TV	Around 100 (Including 11 Paid Channels)	No	Yes	Yes	Yes	Digital satellite

== Analog terrestrial television ==
The traditional way of receiving television in Thailand is through analog terrestrial television; however, it has now largely been supplanted by digital providers. There are 6 channels; three of them are government public-owned by MCOT the 2 television channels terrestrial free-to-air 9MCOT and Channel 3. RTA5 and BBTV Channel 7 are owned by Royal Thai Army, while NBT and Thai PBS are fully government-owned. Analog terrestrial transmissions were switched off in phases as part of the digital switchover, which was completed in 2020 in line with ASEAN recommendations.

The independently run Provincial Public Relations Department Television Services were discontinued in 1988 when the National NBT TV feed from Bangkok, also operated by the Public Relations Department, became available to those provincial studios. Since then, local programming has been given a two-hour time slot each day in the schedule.

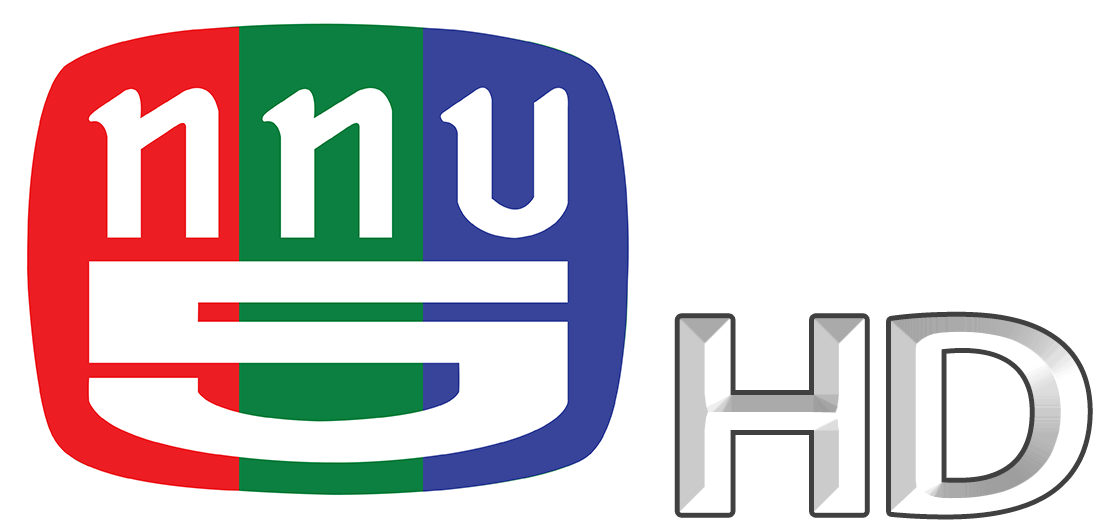
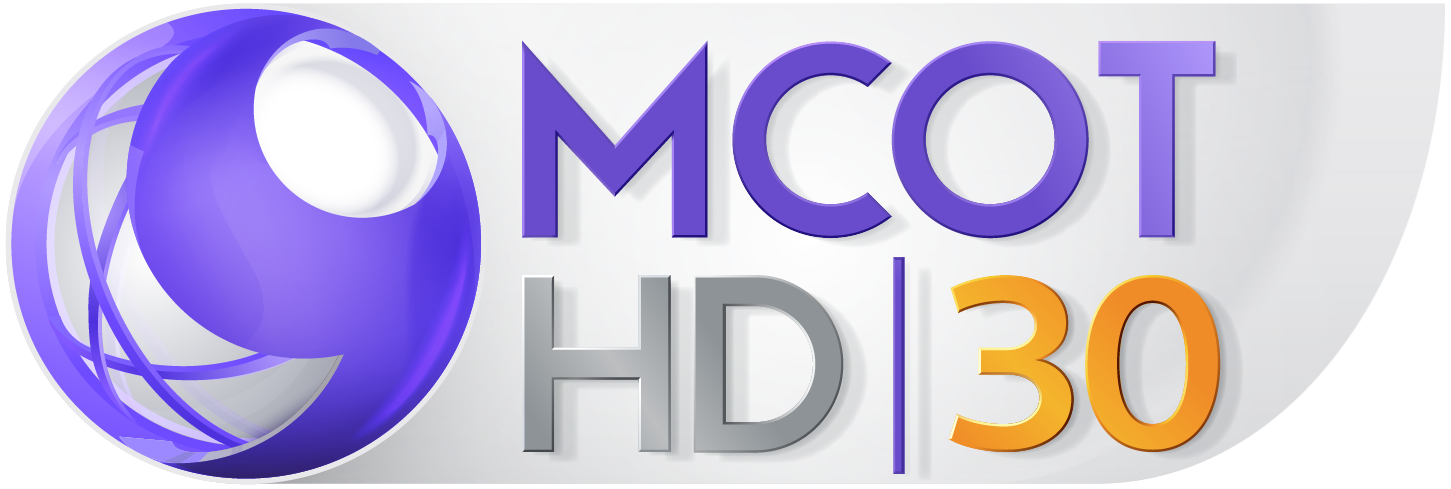
Logo	Digital LCN	Channel Name	Former Name/Replaced	Owners	Operators	Analog Transmitters in Bangkok	Broadcast Area	Broadcast hours	End of Analog Transmission
	33	Channel 3 HD	Channel 3 Analog/Original	BEC World	BEC World; MCOT	3 (VHF) (1970-2008); 32 (UHF) (2006-2020)	Nationwide	24 hours	26 March 2020 (00:01)
	5	RTA5	HSATV (Channel 7)	Royal Thai Army		5 (VHF)	Nationwide	05:00 – 00:00 (Next Day)	21 June 2018 (09:29)
	35	Channel 7 HD	Channel 7 Color Television	Bangkok Broadcasting & Television Company Limited	Bangkok Broadcasting & Television Company Limited; Royal Thai Army	7 (VHF)	Nationwide	24 hours	17 June 2018 (00:00)
	30	9MCOT	TTV Channel 4, TTV Channel 9, MCOT Channel 9 and Modernine TV	MCOT		9 (VHF)	Nationwide	24 hours	16 July 2018 (18:30)
	2	National Broadcasting Services of Thailand	TVT 11 or TV (Channel) 11	The Government Public Relations Department of the Prime Minister's Office		11 (VHF)	Nationwide	05:00 – 00:00 (Next Day)	16 July 2018 (00:00)
	3	Thai Public Broadcasting Service	Replaced:ITV, TITV; Formerly: TPBS, TV Thai	Thai Public Broadcasting Service		29 (UHF)	Nationwide	05:00 – 01:00 (Next Day)	16 June 2018 (00:00)

== Digital terrestrial television ==
In 2005, the Ministry of Information announced their plan to digitalize nationwide free-to-air TV broadcasts led by MCOT. Trial broadcasts were undertaken, involving one thousand households in Bangkok from December 2000 until May 2001. In December 2013, the National Broadcasting and Telecommunications Commission (NBTC) set up a series of auctions for DTTV. Four types of licenses are offered: High-Definition channel license, Standard-Definition channel license, News channel license, and Youth/Family channel license. All the major operators and content owners in the industry, such as BEC World, Bangkok Broadcasting & Television, GMM Grammy, Thairath Newspaper, Nation Multimedia Group, TrueVisions, etc., won the bid for new licenses. According to the license conditions, DTTV services have been launched since April 2014.

== Popularity of terrestrial TV stations ==
The audience share achieved by each terrestrial channel in Thailand is shown in the first table below. The second table shows the share each channel receives of total TV advertising spending. Channel 7 is both the most popular and most commercially successful station with just under 50% of the total audience followed by Channel 3 at just under 30%. The other terrestrial stations share the remaining 20% of the TV audience between them.

Audience Share:

TV Station (Operator)	2005	2006	2007	2008	2009	2010	2011 1H
Channel 7	42.4	41.3	42.0	44.7	45.4	43.8	47.5
Channel 3	24.5	25.6	29.5	26.8	27.7	29.5	29.0
RTA5	8.1	7.3	6.7	7.6	8.6	8.0	6.9
9MCOT	10.3	10.2	9.2	9.6	9.9	9.7	9.2
NBT	2.9	3.0	2.4	4.9	3.4	3.4	2.4
Thai PBS (Values shown for 2005 - 2007 is for iTV and TITV)	11.8	12.6	10.2	6.1	4.9	5.6	5.0

Market Share - Share of total TV advertising spending:

TV Station (Operator)	2005	2006	2007	2008	2009	2010	2011 1H
Channel 7	28.0	27.4	27.7	31.0	28.0	31.0	31.7
Channel 3	20.8	22.2	22.5	28.0	28.0	27.0	27.0
RTA5	16.5	16.0	15.9	20.0	20.0	18.0	17.7
9MCOT	13.9	14.4	14.5	17.0	19.0	20.0	20.0
NBT	2.3	2.8	2.6	4.0	4.0	4.0	3.6
Thai PBS	18.5	17.3	16.9	Advertising isn’t allowed on Thai PBS			

Audience Share (2022):

Position	Channel	Share of total viewing (%)
1	Channel 7	15.6
2	Channel 3	10.8
3	MONO29	9.1
4	Workpoint TV	6.5
5	ONE31	6.3
6	Thairath TV	6.0
7	Amarin TV	5.3
8	Channel 8	3.8
9	PPTV 36	2.5
10	True4U	1.9
11	9MCOT	1.8
12	GMM25	1.6
13	RTA5	1.5
14	Thai PBS	1.4
15	NBT	0.8
16	TNN16	0.6

== See also ==
- List of television channels in Thailand
- Mass media in Thailand
