= Krittapak Udompanich =

Thai actor

- บูม กฤตภัค อุดมพานิชย์
- Born: 12 January 2001 (age 25); Thailand
- Other names: Boom (บูม); Bum Krittaphak Udomphanit
- Occupation: Actor
- Years active: 2016–present

Krittapak Udompanich (Thai: กฤตภัค อุดมพานิชย์), professionally known as Boom (Thai: บูม), is a Thai actor. He is best known for the role Tee in the BL series Make It Right: The Series (2016), a role he reprised in Make It Right 2: The Series (2017) and the miniseries Make It Live: On The Beach (2019).

In 2021, he starred in the sixth episode of the anthology series Seven Project. In 2026, he was confirmed as part of the cast of Make It Right 2026, a project produced to commemorate the tenth anniversary of the Make It Right franchise.

== Career ==
Boom made his acting debut in 2016 as Kyumin in War of High School The Series. Later that year, he gained wider recognition after portraying Tee in Make It Right: The Series, one of the early Thai BL series to reach an international audience.

In 2017, he reprised the role of Tee in Make It Right 2: The Series and also starred in the short film Enough. Two years later, he returned as Tee in the miniseries Make It Live: On The Beach, which reunited part of the original cast of the Make It Right franchise.

Between 2020 and 2021, he appeared in Why R U? and You Never Eat Alone before starring in the episode Would You Be My Love? of the anthology series Seven Project.

In 2026, he was announced as part of the cast of Make It Right 2026, a new adaptation of the series produced to celebrate the tenth anniversary of the franchise.

== Filmography ==
=== Television ===
Year	Title	Role	Notes	Network / Platform
2016	War of High School The Series	Kyumin	Main role	Channel 9 MCOT HD
2016	Make It Right: The Series	Tee	Main role	Channel 9 MCOT HD / LINE TV
2017	Make It Right 2: The Series	Tee	Main role	LINE TV
2019	Make It Live: On The Beach	Tee	Main role	LINE TV
2020	Why R U?	Tee	Guest role (ep. 2)	One31
2020	You Never Eat Alone	Te	Guest role (ep. 7)	GMM25
2021	Seven Project	Phupha Chaiyaphat Vorakitikorn	Main role (ep. 6)	GMM25 / WeTV
2026	Make It Right 2026	TBA	Cast	MCOT HD / VIU

=== Films ===
Year	Title	Role	Notes
2017	Enough	Boom (Travel)	Main role
2018	Cross-Dimension Love	Xiao Bu (Boom)	Supporting role

=== Specials ===
Year	Title	Role	Notes
2017	Siam 13 Hours	Bas	Main role

== Discography ==
=== Singles and OSTs ===
- 2016 – Kwahm rak tung jet (with the cast of Make It Right: The Series – Rak Ok Doen)
- 2016 – Hello
- 2017 – Kaup koon na (with Peemapol Panichtamrong, Pawat Chittsawangdee and Sittiwat Imerbpathom)
- 2017 – Mai yahk mee kwahm rak (with Peemapol Panichtamrong)

== Events ==
Year	Event	Venue	Notes
2016	Make It Right: The Series Press Conference	Siam Paragon, Bangkok	Official launch event for the series with the main cast.
2019	Make It Live: On The Beach promotional event	Bangkok	Promotional interview featuring Boom and Peemapol Panichtamrong ahead of the release of the miniseries.
2021	Everyday Special Campaign	Thailand	Participated in a charity campaign promoting OTOP products alongside Peemapol Panichtamrong.
2026	Make It Right 2026 first poster launch	Thailand	Took part in the launch of the first official poster, marking his return to the Make It Right franchise.
