= Lovex3 =

2026 Thai television series

- Official series poster
- Thai: หลักสูตร (รัก) ภาคบังคับ
- Genre: Boys' love; Drama; Romance
- Based on: รักร้ายของผู้ชายคูลๆ; เขาหมุนรอบความรัก; พารักศึกษา; by Chiffon_cake
- Written by: Nichaphat Aunhabundit
- Directed by: Vorachai Nualsri
- Starring: Krit Ngamtanakijja; Pongphop Samranchaiyakorn; Pichitchai Limpakuptathaworn; Saharat Sirithumkunti; Deeprompt Soontornsittisopa; Ditheechok Wongbunditjaroen
- Opening theme: "Can I? (ชอบได้ป่าว)" by Lovex3 & VVV
- Ending theme: "Now I Know (คำตอบ)" by Chok Ditheechok (Ep. 1–2); "S.th More (แอบคิด)" by Krit Ngamtanakijja (Ep. 3–4); "Can I? (ชอบได้ป่าว)" by Lovex3 & VVV (Ep. 5–8); "Say Again (อยากฟังอีกครั้ง)" by Chok Ditheechok (Ep. 9–12); "Full HD (มันยังชัดอยู่เลย)" by Ford Kunanon (Ep. 13–15)
- Country of origin: Thailand
- Original language: Thai
- No. of episodes: 15

Production
- Executive producers: Itkan Achirasidphawat; Thanatchaikorn Achirasidphawat; Natcha Kongnasiri
- Producers: Phimphisa Kawilaphan; Sita Witthayanan
- Cinematography: Narit Chanjiresrassamee; Teerut Thumthae
- Running time: 55–68 minutes
- Production company: Tia51

Original release
- Network: MCOT; iQIYI
- Release: 16 August – 22 November 2026

Lovex3 (stylized as LOVEx3; Thai: หลักสูตร (รัก) ภาคบังคับ; RTGS: Laksut (Rak) Phakbangkhap, lit. 'Compulsory (Love) Curriculum') is a 2026 Thai boys' love television series, produced by Tia51, starring Krit Ngamtanakijja, Pongphop Samranchaiyakorn (Phop), Pichitchai Limpakuptathaworn (Pao), Saharat Sirithumkunti (Tonkla), Deeprompt Soontornsittisopa (NJ) and Ditheechok Wongbunditjaroen (Chok).

The series premiered on MCOT on 16 August 2026, airing on Sundays at 22:30 ICT. The television version consists of 12 episodes. The uncut version was made available for streaming at 22:30 ICT on iQIYI and consists of 15 episodes. The series concluded on 22 November 2026.

== Plot ==
Set at Thapfa Wittayanusorn School, Lovex3 follows three independent romantic stories involving students who face different challenges related to love, friendship and growing up. Throughout the series, the characters experience everything from unrequited feelings to meaningful reunions and relationships that develop from high school into university.

== Cast and characters ==
=== Main ===
- Krit Ngamtanakijja as Physics Kittiteerawat
- Pongphop Samranchaiyakorn (Phop) as Tinnaphat Phichitchainon (Fuen)
- Pichitchai Limpakuptathaworn (Pao) as Phudin Assawaphalakul (Din)
- Saharat Sirithumkunti (Tonkla) as Satayu Siriwatthanawongphaisan (Star)
- Deeprompt Soontornsittisopa (NJ) as Akkharawit Charoenwet (Aof)
- Ditheechok Wongbunditjaroen (Chok) as Chemi Kittiteerawat
- Vachirawit Ouitayakul (Volk) as Teeraphat Kiattiwong (Tang)
- Veeraphat Youngyuenskuldej (Peak) as Anantakal Niranwong (Time)

=== Supporting ===
- Komtaat Pichetpaisarn (Fair) as Rachata Khajornchaloem (Rei)
- Nuttaon Usavaprasertdee (Ice) as Anya Sirikhana (Memii)
- Sirawas Tanatatsupaset (Asia) as Naphat Woraphongphakdi (Est)
- Khetsophon Sophonmanee (Pooh) as Pitchayapong Kawilawong (Jay)
- Kwanbhumi Sermsirimongkol (Dedee) as Peeraphat Kitiwilanan (Zac)
- Theechula Wontanawaigoon (Thee) as Porameth Amornphong (Nate)
- Todsawat Loylertrit (Tac) as Siraphop Waranonkul (Tue)
- Phurinat Panprommin (Copter) as Theenat Amornsiridecha (Booboo)
- Chawanwit Phongphan (VJ) as Rawinam Watcharawet (Kim)
- Nathaphop Sirirubchok (Munich) as Siwakorn Karawekkul (Tonnam)
- Bowontrub Sintrubowon (Jackpot) as Thanaphob Krittayakorn (Chok)
- Krin Prakrut (Voska) as Kritthaphat Udomsiri (Nut)
- Winthakorn Chaichamroonphan (Plawan) as Preechawat Suwannakul (Top)
- Tobias Vandepitte (Toby) as Thanaphasorn Phadungphaisan (Thanop)
- Korawin Chaichamroonphan (Plakao) as Athirat Suwannakul (Art)
- Kunanon Chirarungsaengstid (Ford) as Jetphop Sophanasakkul (Jet)
- Thiarachai Seereviriyakun (Sun) as Phakawat Sakdashiri (Ply)
- Thiararuj Seereviriyakun (Sand) as Pakin Sakdasiri (Phrues)

== Soundtrack ==
Lovex3 Soundtrack
| No. | Title | Writer(s) | Artist | Length |
|---|---|---|---|---|
| 1. | "Now I Know (คำตอบ)" | Waratsinthorn Paisitpornpawan | Chok Ditheechok Wongbundijaroen | 3:32 |
| 2. | "Can I? (ชอบได้ป่าว)" | Waratsinthorn Paisitpornpawan; Nutta Chantaraphum | Pao; Tonkla; Volk; Peak; Tac; Munich; VVV | 2:37 |
| 3. | "S.th More (แอบคิด)" | Waratsinthorn Paisitpornpawan; Nutta Chantaraphum | Krit Ngamtanakijja | 2:26 |
| 4. | "Full HD (มันยังชัดอยู่เลย)" | Waratsinthorn Paisitpornpawan | Ford Kunanon Chirarungsaengstid | 4:02 |
| 5. | "If I Know (ถ้ารู้เร็วกว่านี้)" | Waratsinthorn Paisitpornpawan; Nutta Chantaraphum | Chok Ditheechok Wongbunditjaroen | 4:53 |
| 6. | "Say Again (อยากฟังอีกครั้ง)" | Waratsinthorn Paisitpornpawan; Nutta Chantaraphum | Chok Ditheechok Wongbunditjaroen | 4:00 |

== Production ==
The series was announced by Tia51 in December 2025, with Sangcharoen Jirappapa (EikQ) and Tatchapong Chotchaicharin (Patto) cast as one of the lead couples in the series. However, before filming began, both actors left the project. In June 2026, the production company released the official trailer, confirming the premiere date of 16 August 2026 and revealing the series would be led by Krit Ngamtanakijja and Pongphop Samranchaiyakorn.

Filming was completed in July 2026, after just over two months of production. Lovex3 adapts three novels from Chiffon_cake's Love ยกกำลัง 3, bringing three independent stories together in a single series. All three stories take place at Thapfa Wittayanusorn School and explore different forms of love and coming of age during youth.
