= Thai News Agency =

Thai News Agency is news agency and subsidiary of MCOT. Founded on 16 June 1977, Thai News Agency has main responsibilities about production, gather, analyze and report news for on air in radio, television, electronics, internet, social media and other.

25 April 2012 Thai News Agency bought video wall long 25 meters. Yingluck Shinawatra open using New video wall.

== Cooperation with foreign news agencies ==
Thai News Agency cooperation with foreign agency such as

=== Television ===
- CNN
- CCTV
- NHK
- TV5Monde
- RAI
- STRFT
- VTV

=== Radio ===
- ABC
- BBC
- VOA
- CNN Radio [8]

== News Anchors ==
- Suwit Suthiprapha
- Neeracha Limsomboon
- Kamphu Phuriphuwadon
- Ratchanee Sutthitham
- Kamonnet Nuanchan
- Vanessa Samucsaruth
- Danai Ekmahasawat
- Amornrat Mahittirukh
- Suthiwat Hongpoonphiphat
- Suta Suteephichetphan
- Chalermporn Tantikanchanakul
- Nathiprada Euapiboonwatana
- Teerawat Puengthong
- Kulthida Siriissaranan
- Napat Theeraditthakul
- Chutima Puengkwamsook
- Masiri Klomkaew
- Thaninwat Patweerakhun
- Wirinthira Nathongbocharat
- Boromwut Hiranyathiti
- Annop Thongbosut
- Nattawat Plengsiriwat
- Patcharinphon Nathongborcharat
- Khamron Wangwangsri
- Piya Sawetpikul
- Phot Arnon
- Benjaphon Cheai-arun
- Thansita Suwatcharathanakit
- Wansiri Siriwan
- Khanittha Amornmetwarin
- Suthida Plongputsa
- Peeraphon Anutarasoth
- Darakan Thonglim
- Weera Thiraphat
- Jamon Kitsaowapak
- Penphan Laemluang
- Rattiya Ruangkajorn
- Phattradanai Thessuwan
- Jirayu Japbang
- Ratchanipong Worasarin
- Somyot Daengyuan
- Nantaka Worawanitchanan
- Pataravee Bunprasert
- Thames Sappakit
- Ratthanan Chanyachirawong
- Pimlada Chaiprechawit
- Pattheera Srutipongphosin
- Ronnachai Sirikhan
- Wasin Bunyakhom
- Thanatphan Buranachiwawilai
- Chalathit Tantiwut
- Rasameekhae Fahkuelon
- Panadda Wongphudee
- Pantila Fuklin

== See also ==
- 9MCOT HD
- MCOT
