= ASEAN Television =

ASEAN Television is a MCOT-operated channel provide arts and culture programmes, news and documentaries of the ASEAN member countries.

This Channel can be found at channel 99 on TrueVisions and its official website.

ASEAN TV began broadcasting on the summit of ASEAN leaders at Cha-am and Hua Hin.
