= Piya Sawetpikul =

Thai actor (born 1968)

- ปิยะ เศวตพิกุล
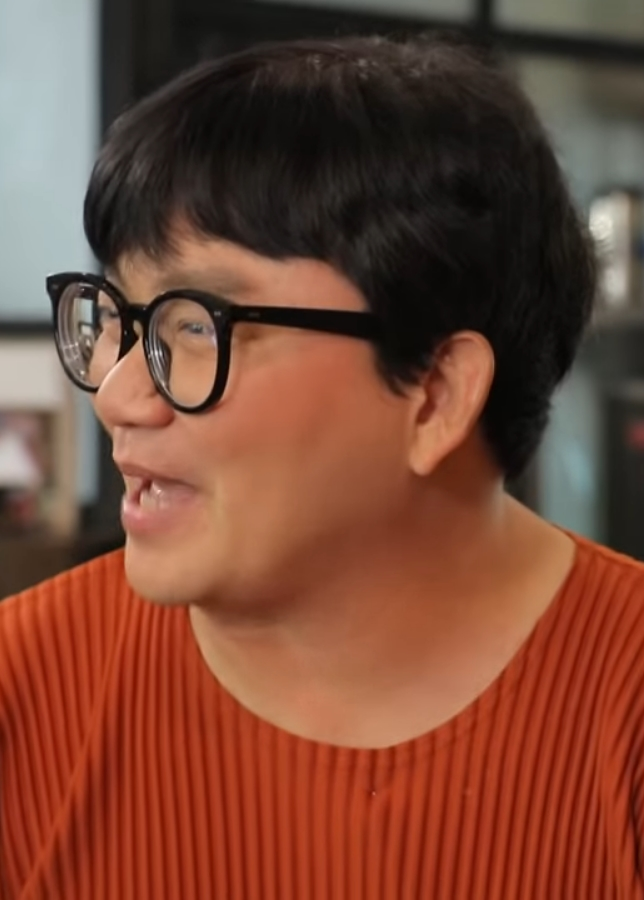
- Born: October 25, 1968 (age 57); Bangkok, Thailand
- Other name: Kong (ก้อง)
- Occupation: Actor
- Years active: 1993–present

Piya Sawetpikul (ปิยะ เศวตพิกุล; born 25 October 1968), nicknamed Kong (ก้อง), is a Thai actor, television host, and television producer.

== Life and career ==
Piya Sawetpikul was born on October 25, 1968, in Bangkok. He studied at Bangkok University. During this period, he met his inspirational entertainment figures such as Daraneenuch Pasutanavin, which inspired him. In 2024, he got a degree in Communication Arts from Bangkokthonburi University.

Piya began his acting career in the early 1993, He got various roles as a distinctive character actor in Thai television and cinema. Due to his acting style, he got a role as the main protagonists. In television, he has appeared in Lakorn primarily broadcast on Channel 3. Some of his notable television roles include Kluen Cheewit (2017), Buang Hong (2017), Mud Huajai Yai Sup'tar (2022), and Chai Phaet-sa-ya (2023).

== Personal life ==
Piyacame out as gay and has frequently spoken about his identity and his relationship in Thai entertainment media and interviews.

== Filmography ==
=== Television dramas ===
Year	Title	Network
1993–1995	Sam Khon Onlaweng	RTA 5
1995	Phuchai Mai Pradap	Channel 7HD
1995	Ai Khun Phi	Channel 3HD
1995	He Ha Mia Navy	RTA 5
1996	Jong Rak	RTA 5
1996	Aep Gep Jai Wai Glai Ter	RTA 5
1997	Insee Daeng	Channel 7HD
1997	Phor Khrua Hua Pa	Channel 3HD
1997	Fah Sang Thee Klang Dong	Channel 3HD
1997	Snaeha... Phayabat	Channel 3HD
1997	Kong Phan Thahan Ken	RTA 5
1997	Phuen	RTA 5
1997	Wiwa Fai	RTA 5
1998	Manyarisya	RTA 5
1998	Sawan Baan Thung	9MCOT HD
1998	Super Luk Thung	9MCOT HD
1998	Fai Ritsaya	Channel 7HD
1998	Saphai Patiwat	Channel 7HD
1998	Wai Rai Wai Rak	Channel 3HD
1998	Chuan Fan Phanan Rak	Channel 7HD
1998	Phor Jom Yuan Mae Jom Yung	Channel 3HD
1998	Sai Yom See	Channel 3HD
1998	Det Mae Yai	9MCOT HD
1998	Khanom Pang Kab Nam Phrik	Channel 3HD
1999	Rak Sai Sai Huajai Diaw Kan	Channel 3HD
1999	Jenny Nang Sao Jam Pen Ha	Channel 3HD
1999	Robat Thoet Thoeng	RTA 5
1999	Rak Song Phop	Channel 7HD
2000	Mon Maya	Channel 7HD
2000	Chao Sua Noi	Channel 7HD
2001	Khom Phayabat	Channel 7HD
2001	Robat Thoet Thoeng	RTA 5
2001	Kak Phet	Channel 3HD
2001	Huajai Nai Suyyakat	Channel 7HD
2001	Ajarn Koy	Channel 3HD
2001	Wai Rai High School	Channel 3HD
2001	Sen Sai Lai Rak	Channel 3HD
2001	Thong Prakai Saed	RTA 5
2001	Kintamani Thee Nee Mee Rak	Channel 3HD
2001	Robat Thoet Thoeng	RTA 5
2001	Lhong Fai	ITV
2002	Thale Rue Im	ITV
2002	Shopping Ping Rak	Channel 7HD
2002	Khrop Khrua Tua Or	Channel 3HD
2002	Saeng Dao Fang Talay	Channel 7HD
2002	Baan See Khao Gab Dao Duang Derm	ITV
2003	Phu Yai Lee Gab Nang Ma	ITV
2003	Wiwa Pha Wun	Channel 3HD
2003	Suea	Channel 3HD
2003	Sai Nam Luk Phu Chai	Channel 3HD
2003	Tuek Sam Phedan Sung	Channel 3HD
2003	Fai Nam Khang	RTA 5
2003	Thap Thewa	Channel 7HD
2004	Mae Ai Sa-uen	Channel 7HD
2004	Nang Sao Jing Jai Kab Nai Saen Dee	Channel 7HD
2005	Huajai Lat Fah	Channel 3HD
2005	Ping	Channel 3HD
2005	Thepthida Rong Ngan	9MCOT HD
2005	Rak Lamun Lun Lamai	Channel 3HD
2005	Robat Thoet Thoeng	RTA 5
2005	Bap Rak Talay Fan	Channel 3HD
2006	Rang Rit Phitsawat	Channel 7HD
2006	Krang Neung Muea Rao Rak Kan	Channel 3HD
2007	Aphimahuma Maha Setthi	Channel 7HD
2007	Robat Thoet Thoeng	RTA 5
2007	Phut Rak Na Mo	Channel 7HD
2009	Phu Yai Lee Gab Nang Ma	Channel 3HD
2010	Saphai Chao Sua	Channel 3HD
2010	Khey Baan Nok	Channel 3HD
2012	Thong Prakai Saed	Channel 8
2014	Dong Dok Ngiu	Channel 8
2014	Na-rak	RTA 5
2017	Khluen Chiwit	Channel 3HD
2017	Buang Hong	Channel 3HD
2017	Sri Ayodhaya	True4U
2018	Robat Thoet Thoeng Soi Kha Khrai Ya Tae	Channel 3HD
2021	E-Sao Antarai	Channel 3HD
2021	Help Me Khun Pee Chuay Duay	Channel 3HD
2022	War of Y	AIS PLAY
2022	Mud Huajai Yai Sup'tar	Channel 3HD
2023	Chai Phaet-sa-ya	Channel 3HD
2024	Nai Wanthi Fon Phrang Phrai	Channel 3HD

=== Films ===
Year	Title	Role	Notes
1997	Fun Tit Fai Huachai Tit Din	Pop	
2004	Club Sa Pit Tamra Saeb	Jusear	Guest appearance
2006	The Last Song	Farrah	
2007	The Bodyguard 2	Bar Gay Customer 2	
2010	Eternity (Chua Fah Din Salai)		Guest appearance
2012	Jan Dara the Beginning	Somjuk	
2013	Jan Dara: The Finale	Somjuk	
2014	The Scar	Akong	Guest appearance
2020	Pojaman Sawang Katta	Chainoi	Guest appearance
