= Saengchai Sunthornwat =

Thai journalist

Saengchai Sunthornwat TM
- แสงชัย สุนทรวัฒน์
- Born: June 12, 1943; Prachin Buri, Thailand
- Died: April 11, 1996 (aged 52); Pak Kret, Nonthaburi, Thailand
- Cause of death: Assassination by handgun
- Occupations: Journalist; Lawyer; Writer
- Years active: 1982–1996
- Known for: Last director and key people of MCOT
- Notable work: Columnist "Fud Fid For Fai"; Last director and key people of MCOT
- Spouse: Wachari Sunthornwat
- Children: Isara Sunthornwat

Saengchai Sunthornwat (Thai: แสงชัย สุนทรวัฒน์; June 12, 1943 – April 11, 1996) was a Thai journalist, lawyer and writer. He served as director of MCOT before his death.

== Early life ==
He was born on June 12, 1943, in Prachin Buri Province. He was a son of Pradit and Bunyuen Sunthornwat. He finished secondary school from Triam Udom Suksa School, bachelor's degree from Thammasat University and did his master's degree from a university in the United States. He married Watcharee Sunthornwat with whom he had a son, Isara Sunthornwat.

== Career ==
He had a job in law as well as restaurants in the United States. In 1982, he started his career in journalism by writing columns for Phim Thai and Daily News. In 1983, his column about the English language, "Fud Fit For Fai" became popular.

He returned to Thailand in 1983, where he worked as the director of MCOT between 1993 and 1996.

== Assassination ==
Saengchai Sunthornwat was killed by a gunman who fired on his car as he was driving to his suburban Bangkok home on April 11, 1996. Sunthornwat was aged 52. Ubol Bunyachalorthon was charged with masterminding the death, but was shot and killed before being convicted.

== Honours ==
- Commander of the Order of the Crown of Thailand (1983)

== In popular culture ==
- Modernine TV discussed Saengchai Sunthornwat on TimeLine, 23 June 2015, in "Light ... of victory".
