= Love in the Moonlight (Thai TV series) =

2025 Thai television series

- Thai: สลักรักในแสงจันทร์
- Genre: Romantic drama; Boys' love; Period drama
- Screenplay by: Chawanon Sarapat; Wantawil Suknoy; Nonthaphorn Praphaphorn
- Directed by: Pha-oon Chandrasiri
- Starring: Peemapol Panichtamrong; Satjakorn Chalard; Veerinsara Tangkitsuvanich
- Music by: Fidelio (Bangkok)
- Country of origin: Thailand
- Original language: Thai
- No. of episodes: 12

Production
- Cinematography: Wisawet Buranawittayawut
- Running time: 50–102 minutes

Original release
- Network: One 31; GagaOOLala
- Release: 15 September – 21 October 2025

Love in the Moonlight (Thai: สลักรักในแสงจันทร์; RTGS: Salak Rak Nai Saengchan, lit. 'Carve Love in the Moonlight') is a 2025 Thai boys' love drama television series, starring Peemapol Panichtamrong (Peak), Satjakorn Chalard (Pearl), and Veerinsara Tangkitsuvanich (Perth).

The series premiered on One 31 on 15 September 2025 and was also available for streaming on GagaOOLala.

== Synopsis ==
Set in 1963, the story follows Prince Saenkaew, who is sent from the fictional kingdom of Sariangkham to Bangkok to marry Pinanong, a union intended to secure his family's assets in Thailand. Pinanong welcomes the arrangement, having long harbored feelings for the prince. However, her cousin Sasin is skeptical of the marriage and shares a complicated history with Saenkaew. As the prince begins to reveal the emotional burden of marrying out of duty, Sasin finds himself drawn into a connection that neither of them anticipated—one that challenges their past and reshapes their future.

== Cast and characters ==
=== Main ===
- Peemapol Panichtamrong (Peak) as Prince Saenkaew Na Chansaeng
- Satjakorn Chalard (Pearl) as Sasin
- Veerinsara Tangkitsuvanich (Perth) as Pinanong "Pin" Sirichalalai

=== Supporting ===
- Chatchai Plengpanich as Prince Kamfa
- Dom Hetrakul as Kalong (General)
- Ruengrit McIntosh as Bodin
- Rhatha Phongam as Rachawadi
- Pimpan Chalaikupp (Pim) as Wad
- Duangta Toongkamanee as Chao Sri Dara
- Natha Lloyd (Mai) as Homthip
- Wattana Kumthorntip (Gift) as Khamsu
- Nut Devahastin as Inthra
- Suzana Renaud as Songsawat
- Chokchai Moomak (Act) as Mingmit
- Kidakarn Ratchakitprakarn (Karn) as Sanya
- Pichaya Tippala (Dream) as Duangkamol

=== Guest ===
- Khunakorn Kirdpan as Somkhit
- Paweena Charivsakul as Thararat
- Anis Suwit (Mild) as Dueanpradap
- Atthaseri Klot as Field Marshal

== Soundtrack ==
Love in the Moonlight Soundtrack
No.	Title	Writer(s)	Artist	Length
1.	"Once Forever (ครั้งหนึ่งตลอดไป)"	Amp Achariya Dulyapaiboon	Boom Saharat	3:26

== Broadcast ==
The series aired from 15 September to 21 October 2025 on One 31, with episodes released every Monday and Tuesday. It is also available internationally via the streaming platform GagaOOLala. The show gained significant traction online, trending #1 on X (formerly Twitter) following a romantic scene between Pearl and Peak.

== Reception ==
Love in the Moonlight received generally positive reviews from viewers. On the drama database site MyDramaList, the series holds a rating of 8.6 out of 10, based on 1,441 user votes. On IMDb, it has an average score of 8.8 out of 10, with 110 user ratings as of October 2025.

== Production ==
A ceremonial blessing event was held prior to filming, in line with Thai tradition for auspicious beginnings.

== Awards and nominations ==
Award nominations for Love in the Moonlight
Year	Award	Category	Nominee(s)	Result	Ref.
2026	Pattaya International Film Festival 2026	Outstanding Rising BL Actor	Satjakorn Chalard and Peemapol Panichtamrong	Won	
2026	Y Entertain Awards 2026	Leading Boys' Love Star of the Year	Peemapol Panichtamrong	Nominated	
2026	Y Entertain Awards 2026	Best Series OST of the Year	"Once Forever"	Nominated	
