= MET 107 =

Radio station in Bangkok, Thailand

Met 107 is a radio station of MCOT Public company limited in Bangkok, Thailand.
