= Flower Boy (TV series) =

2026 Thai television series

- Official series poster
- Thai: หลงกลิ่นเกสร
- Genre: Romance; Fantasy; Boys' love
- Written by: Danuphon Chaimueanwong; Sorawee Alphachon; Anchalee Maitree; Gilata Thepchim
- Directed by: Nuttapong Wongkaveepairoj; Lakkhet Wasikachart; Santi Torwiwat
- Starring: Satjakorn Chalard; Peemapol Panichtamrong
- Music by: Chanut Ngamsiriporn; Wutticha Kuanium
- Country of origin: Thailand
- Original language: Thai
- No. of episodes: 8

Production
- Executive producers: Takonkiet Viravan; Nipon Pewnen
- Cinematography: Suphakit Thachalat
- Running time: 46–65 minutes
- Production company: One31

Original release
- Network: One31
- Release: 25 April – 13 June 2026

Flower Boy (Thai: หลงกลิ่นเกสร; RTGS: Long Klin Keson, lit. 'Enchanted by the Scent of Pollen (Gaysorn)') is a 2026 Thai romantic fantasy boys' love television series, starring Satjakorn Chalard (Pearl) and Peemapol Panichtamrong (Peak). The series premiered on 25 April 2026 on One31 and the OneD platform. Internationally, the series is available on the streaming service GagaOOLala.

== Synopsis ==
Scent (Satjakorn Chalard) is a young heir to a declining perfume company. Skeptical of love, he sees his only chance to save the family business in finding the Mudan, an isolated tribe in the forests of northern Thailand rumored to produce rare and hypnotic pheromones. Determined to use this "secret ingredient" to create a revolutionary fragrance, Scent embarks on an expedition.

In the forest, he meets Gaysorn (Peemapol Panichtamrong), a beautiful young man from the tribe whose scent is particularly alluring. Scent convinces him to come to the city, hiding his true commercial intentions. What he doesn't know is that the Mudan's aroma reaches its full intensity only when the carrier is in love, and Gaysorn begins to develop genuine feelings for Scent. The mission to save the company becomes an emotional journey where lies and secrets threaten to destroy the love growing between them.

== Cast ==
=== Main ===
- Satjakorn Chalard (Pearl) as Phummarak Sukontawanich (Scent)
- Peemapol Panichtamrong (Peak) as Gaysorn

=== Supporting ===
- Amarin Nitibhon (Am) as Witthaya Sukontawanich
- Phollawat Manuprasert (Tom) as Anurak Sukontawanich
- Petch Boranin as Mekhin
- Jinnaphop Prattranasanti (Tangton) as Sun
- Punnavich Sirikiatvanit (Obey) as Ray
- Sawanee Utoomma (Iang) as Mata
- Penpetch Benyakul (Jab) as Pruek
- Lahwanya Uengsilpsrikul (Alee) as Bussaba
- Pakin Likhitamphon as Tawan

== Soundtrack ==
Flower Boy Soundtrack
No.	Title	Writer(s)	Artist	Length
1.	"ซ่อนกลิ่น (Sonklin)" (Original by Palmy)	Palmy; Weeranat Thipayamonthon; Pheeranut Suksamran	Peak Peemapol	3:37
2.	"กลิ่นเกสร (Klin Keson)"	Maiyarap	Maiyarap	3:36

== Production ==
The series was announced during the "one สนั่นจอ 2026" event by One31 on 25 February 2026. It is the second collaboration between Pearl Satjakorn and Peak Peemapol after Love in the Moonlight (2025).

The series was by Nuttapong Wongkaveepairoj (A), with co-direction by Lakkhet Wasikachart (Nun) and Santi Torwiwat (Ah). The screenplay was written by Danuphon Chaimueanwong, Sorawee Alphachon, Anchalee Maitree and Gilata Thepchim. The series was produced by One31. An official trailer was released on One31's YouTube channel.

== Episodes ==
The series consists of 10 episodes, airing weekly on Saturdays.

List of Flower Boy episodes
Episode	Original title	Air date	Summary
1	"พบเจอ" (Encounter)	25 April 2026	Scent travels north in search of the Mudan tribe. After an accident in the forest, he is saved by Gaysorn, who takes him to his village. Scent becomes fascinated by the young man's unique scent.
2	"เสน่ห์" (Enchantment)	2 May 2026	Scent convinces Gaysorn to go to Bangkok under the guise of a partnership. Gradually, he notices that Gaysorn's scent intensifies when the boy is happy. Witthaya suspects Scent's true intentions.
3	"ภารกิจ" (Mission)	9 May 2026	Tension between Scent and Gaysorn rises as the perfume is developed. Mata reveals to Gaysorn the secret of the pheromone: it is only at its most potent when the carrier is in love.
Remaining episodes will air weekly.

== Broadcast and distribution ==
In Thailand, the series airs every Saturday at 8:30 p.m. on One31 and is available on the oneD app in an UNCUT version. As of 2 May 2026, the series has also been made available internationally by the platform GagaOOLala, with subtitles in English and other languages.

=== Viewership ===
In the table below, the blue number represents the lowest rating and the red number the highest.

Episode No.	Timeslot (UTC+07:00)	Air date	Average audience share
1	Saturday 8:30 p.m.	25 April 2026	0.8%
2	Saturday 8:30 p.m.	2 May 2026	0.8%
3	Saturday 8:30 p.m.	9 May 2026	
Average (up to episode 2)			0.8%
