= ITV (company) =

- Company type: Public
- Founded: May 9, 1995; 30 years ago
- Defunct: September 17, 2024; 17 months ago
- Successor: TITV
- Products: Television stations, print media
- Website: www.itv.co.th

ITV Public Company Limited is a group of companies doing business in television media. It has been approved to operate a UHF television station concession from the Radio and Television Division, Broadcasting and Television Division, Department of Military Communications, Royal Thai Army and MCOT Public Company Limited, 1 channel, transmitting color television in the UHF system on Channel 26 (later changed to Channel 29) under the name ITV Television Station (currently, the station has been transferred to both government agencies, which can be read in detail below). It was formerly called Siam Infotainment Company Limited, founded on May 9, 1995, by Siam Commercial Bank and other companies. The name was changed to ITV Public Company Limited on October 20, 1998. Intouch Holdings Public Company Limited was once the major shareholder of this company until it closed on September 17, 2024.

== History ==
The idea of establishing ITV arose in the government of Anand Panyarachun after the Black May incident in 1992 because five television channels, Channel 3, Channel 5, Channel 7, Channel 9, and Channel 11, did not report the news of the bloodshed according to the truth. In addition, there were calls from the public to open a free television station in the UHF system so that Thai people could receive news that was correct and unbiased.

The Office of the Permanent Secretary to the Prime Minister (OPM), the Radio and Television Division, the Broadcasting and Television Division, the Department of Military Communications, Royal Thai Army, and the Mass Communications Organization of Thailand (MCOT) or MCOT Public Company Limited, which is currently the supervisor of the opening of the new TV station concession, set the conditions of the concession as follows: the concessionaire must have 10 shareholders, each with an equal shareholding, and must be transformed into a public company to prevent monopoly, and must have news and information content of no less than 70 percent and entertainment content of no more than 30 percent.

There are two major groups of bidding companies:

- Siam TV Group has the core of Siam Commercial Bank, Sahasinima Co., Ltd. (with the Crown Property Bureau (now the Privy Purse Bureau) as the major shareholder), Daily News newspaper, Born and Associates Co., Ltd. of Tripop Limpapat, INN News Agency, Dokbiathurakit newspaper, and Tonghua newspaper. This group offers the highest return of approximately 1,000 million baht per year for the entire 25-year concession period of approximately 25,000 million baht.
- The production group includes Nation Group, Pacific Intercommunications Co., Ltd. of Pi Malakul Na Ayutthaya with Dr. Somkiat Onwimol as content controller, Matichon Plc. and Samart Plc. This group received the highest score for content but offered a minimum return of approximately 500 million baht per year.

In 1995, the auction result concluded that Siam TV and Communications Company Limited, a subsidiary of Siam Commercial Bank, received the concession and was approved to operate the station for 30 years (ending on July 3, 2025) to broadcast on Channel 26 from the Office of the Permanent Secretary to the Prime Minister, Radio and Television Division, Broadcasting and Television Division, Department of Military Communications, Royal Thai Army and the Mass Communications Organization of Thailand or (MCOT) or MCOT Public Company Limited at present. The concession fee was 25,200 million baht from the reference price of 10,000 million baht. There was a signing of the contract with the Office of the Permanent Secretary to the Prime Minister, Radio and Television Division, Broadcasting and Television Division, Department of Military Communications, Royal Thai Army and the Mass Communications Organization of Thailand or (MCOT) or MCOT Public Company Limited at present on July 3, 1995, with Apilas Osathanon, the Permanent Secretary to the Prime Minister at that time. Signed a contract with Kasem Chatikavanij, Chairman of the Board, and Olarn Chaiyaprawat, Vice Chairman of Siam Infotainment Co., Ltd.

Later, INN, Dokbiathurakit and Tonghua withdrew Siam Infotainment Group therefore brought in Nation Group, a competitor who participated in the bid but was not selected, to join the investment. Therefore, the total number of investors is the Crown Property Bureau (via Sahasinima), Nation, Kantana, Wattajak, Daily News, Loxley Bourne, and Giant.

The name of this television station was ITV (the station). It officially began broadcasting on July 1, 1996, with a policy to be a television station that gave importance to news programs and current affairs.

On August 1, 1999, ITV changed its UHF channel to the same system, changing from transmitting on channel 26 to transmitting on channel 29, which had been granted permission to use a new frequency by the government agency, and the new channel was still used until the era of TITV and Thai PBS.

== Change of shareholders ==
During the economic crisis in 1997, the company suffered heavy losses. Siam Commercial Bank, as a major shareholder and creditor, changed the chairman of ITV from Olarn Chaiyapravat to Prakit Pratipasen, former Senior Executive Vice President of Siam Commercial Bank Public Company Limited, and had a policy to solve the problem of losses by wanting complete management power by pushing for the amendment of the concession agreement, especially in the matter of distribution of shareholders, and to list the shares on the Stock Exchange of Thailand.

The Cabinet during the time of Prime Minister Chuan Leekpai resolved on February 1, 2000 to approve the amendment of the concession contract, stating that it was to comply with the Public Limited Companies Act of 1992 and the regulations of the Stock Exchange of Thailand. The concession contract was amended on April 25, 2000.

In November 2000, Siam Commercial Bank brought in Shin Corporation Public Company Limited (Shin Corp) to hold shares in ITV for 1,600 million baht, or 39%, while Siam Commercial Bank converted debt into equity, holding 55%, and granted management rights to Shin Corp. Shin Corp. offered to buy common shares from other shareholders, resulting in it becoming the company's major shareholder and sending executives to manage ITV, including Boonklee Plangsiri, Sanchai Tiewprasertkul, and Songsak Premsuk.

The period when the Shinawatra family's Shin Corp group acquired a major stake in ITV coincided with the first general election application by the Thai Rak Thai Party, led by Thaksin Shinawatra.

== Increase of registered capital and amendment of concession contract ==
Shin Corporation increased its registered capital to 1,200 million baht and listed on the Stock Exchange of Thailand in March 2002 and offered its shares to the general public.

In 2003, the registered capital was increased again to 7,800 million baht by issuing 300 million new common shares, totaling 1,500 million baht, to be allocated specifically to the partners, Tripop Limpat and Kantana Group Public Company Limited. The station therefore changed its image by adjusting the program schedule and adding entertainment programs. However, later in 2005, the two partners refused to buy the joint venture shares, but continued to produce programs for the station.

In 2004, Shin Corporation filed a lawsuit with the Arbitration Institute. Request to amend the concession contract and request to reduce the concession fee that must be paid to the government by 1,000 million baht per year, claiming that other private companies pay less: Channel 3 (BEC), 30–year concession (1990–2020), 3,207 million baht, 107 million baht per year / Channel 7 (BBTV), 25–year concession (1998–2023), 4,670 million baht, 187 million baht per year / Channel 5, Modernine TV, and Channel 11 do not have to pay the concession fee because the frequency owner conducts the broadcasting himself).

The arbitration panel consisted of representatives from both parties and three mediators:

- Pradit Ekmanee, former Chief Justice of the Criminal Court, as the chairman of the arbitration panel
- Chaikasem Nitisiri, Deputy Attorney General (at that time), arbitrator for the Prime Minister's Office
- Jumpot Saisunthon, lecturer in the Faculty of Law, Thammasat University, arbitrator for the ITV television station

On January 30, 2004, the arbitration panel ruled to reduce the concession fee for the station to 230 million baht per year, and allowed the station to adjust the ratio of informative to entertainment programs from 70:30 to 50:50 percent. It also ruled that the government must pay the company 20 million baht in compensation because the OPM breached the contract by failing to provide the company and the station with the protection as stated in the concession agreement. At the same time, the Radio and Television Division, Broadcasting and Television Division, Department of Military Communications, Royal Thai Army Headquarters, renewed the contract with Channel 7, Channel 3, MCOT allowed UBC Channel 7 to advertise, and the Public Relations Department allowed Channel 11 to advertise, which affected the company’s status and income.

== Administrative Court's decision revoking the arbitral tribunal's award ==
The OPM filed a petition to the Administrative Court to revoke the decision of the arbitration panel in Case No. 476/2004, regarding the issue of the decision that was specified to be amended in the joint operation agreement, calling on the Central Administrative Court to consider revoking the order of the arbitration panel, which is considered an action that is contrary to the intention, and the OPM stated that the arbitrators' decision exceeded the scope of their authority.

On May 9, 2006, the Central Administrative Court ruled to revoke the arbitrator's order that ordered the OPM to reduce the concession fee for the station and for the OPM to pay compensation to the company.

From the said verdict, the station must pay the concession fee of 1 billion baht per year as before and must adjust the ratio of news and information programs to entertainment programs back to 70:30 percent. In addition, the company must also pay a fine for breaching the concession contract by changing the program schedule that does not comply with the concession contract, calculated as 10 percent of the concession fee each year, calculated as 100 million baht per day since the program schedule adjustment began, for a total period of 2 years, for a total fine of approximately 94 billion baht.

The Central Administrative Court gave reasons for its judgment that the arbitrator's decision to reduce the concession fee had an impact on public interest and was an amendment to the state concession contract, which was beyond the arbitrator's authority. The Company therefore filed an appeal against the Central Administrative Court's judgment to the Supreme Administrative Court.

Later, on December 13, 2006, the Supreme Administrative Court ruled to uphold the Central Administrative Court's decision, resulting in the company still having to pay the concession fee of 1 billion baht per year as before, and the station having to adjust the program schedule according to the original proportion, adjusting it immediately the next day, so as not to have to pay additional fines in case of failure to reach an agreement.

As for the ITV share price, when the Supreme Administrative Court made its ruling, investors sold a large number of shares, and the price dropped significantly until it reached its lowest point (New Low) since it began trading on the market at 1.98 baht, which was the floor price. After that, there were a few buyers who returned, causing the closing price to rise a little more to 2.06 baht, but it was a price that was 26.4 percent lower than the closing price of the previous day.

On December 14, 2006, Chulayuth Hiranyawasit, the then Permanent Secretary of the Prime Minister's Office, held a press conference, demanding that ITV pay the remaining concession fee of 2,210 million baht, plus 15% interest, totaling 464.5 million baht, to the OPM within 45 days, and to pay a fine for breaching the contract regarding the program schedule, another 97,760 million baht. After that, the payment period was extended for another 30 days (ending on March 6, 2007).
