= Thanapat Kawila =

Thai actor and singer (born 1993)

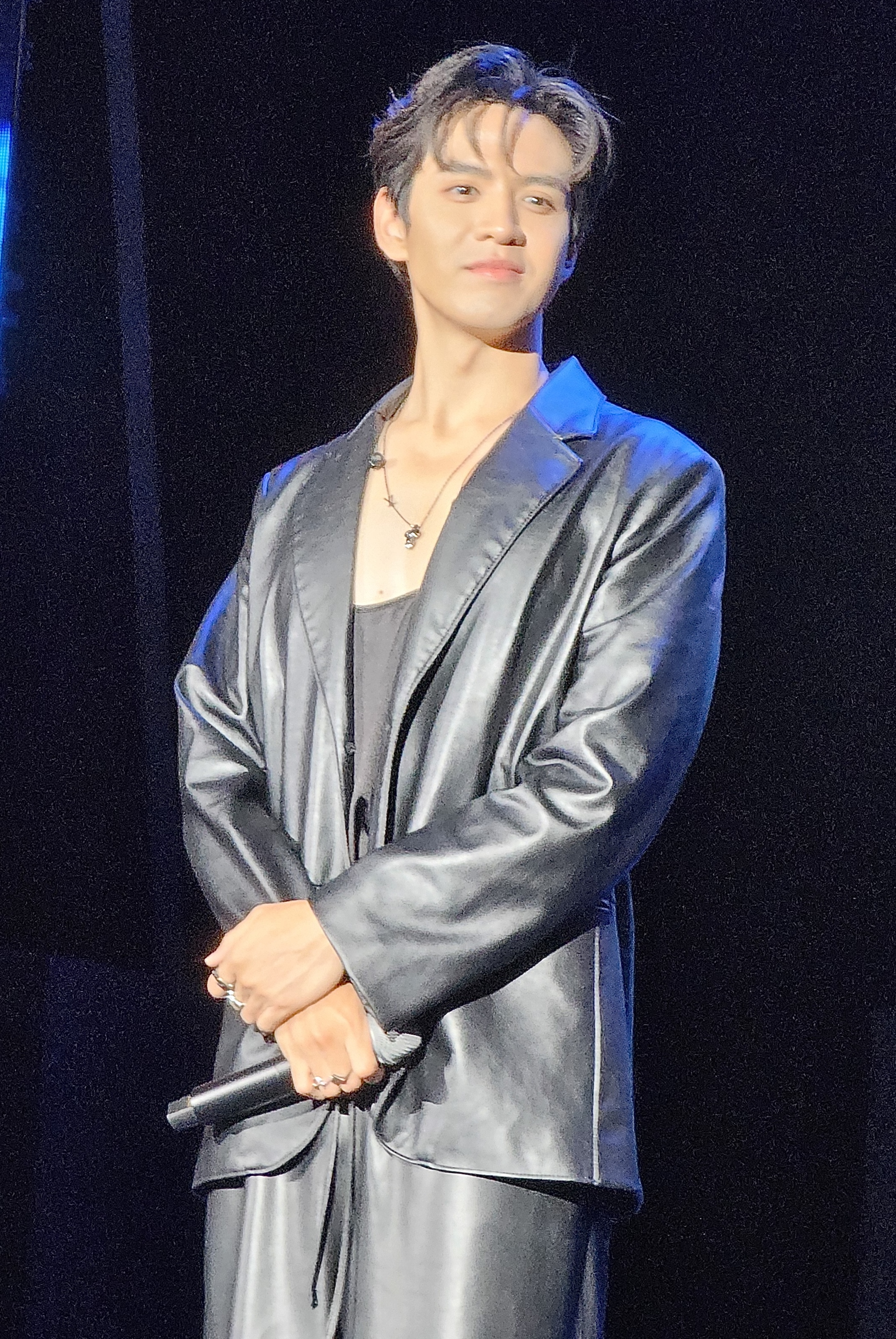
- Thanapat in October 2023
- Born: April 20, 1993 (age 33); Saraburi, Thailand
- Other name: Film
- Education: Bangkok University
- Occupations: Actor; singer
- Years active: 2016 - present
- Agent: One31 (2016-present)
- Height: 180 cm (5 ft 11 in)

Thanapat Kawila (Thai: ธนภัทร กาวิละ; born 20 April 1993), nicknamed Film, is a Thai singer and actor. Entered the industry from the Rakfuntalob Casting Project to find new actors to sign contracts as actors under One31 and co-starred in the series Rakfuntalob, is known for playing the role of Wasin in Mia 2018 and the role of Tian in To Sir, with Love.

== Early life and education ==
Thanapat was born in Wang Muang District, Saraburi Province. Graduated from Saraburiwitthayakhom School and Bangkok University Finance Department, graduated with 2nd place honors, including being a former flight attendant for Thai Lion Air.

== Career ==
He entered the industry from the Rakfuntalob Casting Project to find new actors to sign contracts under One31. and co-starred in the series Rakfuntalob. Known for playing the role of Dr. Intouch in Sanaeha Diary, episode Gubdug Sanaeha, "Phet" in House of Venom and the work that made him famous is Wasin in Mia 2018

In 2019 Thanapat had the opportunity to be one of Project GRAVITY with Singles, a song Khon Diew(Thai: คนเดียว), singing together with Nueng, the band ETC.

Currently considered to be a leading actor on One31 as well. The film has many other works with the channel, such as Nakark Kaew, Phoot Phitsawat, Rak Lak Phop, My Name is Busaba, Phayu Sai, Fa Piang Din and made impression with the role of Tian in To Sir, with Love

== Filmography ==
=== TV dramas/series ===
Year	Title	Role	Broadcest	refs.
2016	Rakfuntalob	Tae/Pong	One31	
2017	Gubdug Sanaeha	Dr. Intouch	One31	
2018	House of Venom	Phet	One31	
2018	Mia 2018	Boss Wasin	One31	
2018	Nakark Keaw	Rath	One31	
2019	Poot Pitsawat	Marut	One31	
2019	Aruna 2019	Boss Wasin	One31	
2020	The Passbook	Pete(Present) Phian(Past)	One31	
2020	My Name is budsaba	Saran	One31	
2021	Payu Sai	Naret	One31	
2022	Fa Piang Din	Thewarat	One31	
2022	To Sir, with Love	Tian	One31	
2023	My Lucky Star	Ratti/Night	One31	
2023	Laws of Attraction	Charn	One31	
2024	The Cruel Game	Phumaret	One31	
2024	Past Life Present Love	Theetat	One31	
2024	The Empress of Ayodhaya	Wamon/Worawongsathirat	One31	
2026	Whisper of Desire		One31	

== Music videos/songs ==
=== Music video appearances ===
Year	Song	Artist	Note
2018	ไม่มีวันปล่อยมือ (Ost.Nakark Keaw)	Dew Arunphong	
2022	แพ้เธอ (Ost.Fa Piang Din)	Phum Kaewfacharoen	

=== Songs ===
Year	Song	Artist	Note
2019	คนเดียว Project GRAVITY	Film Thanapat	with Apiwat Phongwat (ETC.)
2020	ชนะไปแล้ว (Ost.My Name is budsaba)	Film Thanapat	-
2022	True Love Chinese ver. (Ost. To Sir, with Love)	Nunew	with Film Thanapat
2023	สงสัยโลกอยากให้เรารักกัน	Film Thanapat	with Jam Rachata
2023	ไว้ใจฉันได้เสมอ (Ost. Laws of Attraction)	Film Thanapat	with Jam Rachata
2023	มีเธอมีฉัน (Safe Zone)	All artists GMM Grammy	Peck Palitchoke Gawin Caskey PERSES Nanon Korapat Krist Perawat Bright Norrapat Jam Rachata Film Thanapat
2024	หมั่นคอยดูแลและรักษาดวงใจ (Special Cover)	Film Thanapat	Special Cover for the event “ONE Fin Ver: Mystery Box”
2024	วาสนาผู้ใด (Bellotta re: composing version)	Film Thanapat	Advertising music

== Live Performances ==
Year	Con/Meeting	Place	Date	Note
2018	90's NONSTOP CONCERT	Challenger Hall 3, Impact Muang Thong Thani	30 June 2018	Surprise Guest
2019	MY BOYFRIENDS CONCERT	Impact Muang Thong Thani	15 December 2019	
2019	40 years Nok Sinjai The Celebration Show	Muangthai Rachadalai Theater	20 December	Guest
2020	FANTOPIA 2020	Impact Arena, Muang Thong Thani / Challenger Hall 1, Impact Muang Thong Thani	21-22 November 2020	
2022	The 5 Elements First Fan Meeting	Lido Connect Hall 2 Siam Square	25 June 2022	
2022	FLIM’S FIRST FAN MEETING	Lido Connect Hall 2 Siam Square / Live Streaming by TTM LIVE	3 December 2022	
	JAMFILM FANCON “In The Mood for Love”	Muangthai Rachadalai Theater / Live Streaming by TTM LIVE	12 March 2023	
	JAMFILM 1ST FAN MEETING IN MACAU	Broadway Theatre, Broadway Macau, Macau	22 June 2023	
	JAMFILM IN 'FIN' ITY LOA FAN MEETING AND FINAL EP	Union Hall, F6th Floor, Union Mall Shopping Center /Live Streaming by TTM LIVE	2 September 2023	
	JAMFILM 1ST FAN MEETING IN TAIWAN	TICC International Convention Center, Taipei, Taiwan	1 October 2023	
	JAMFILM “ENCORE” FAN MEETING IN MACAU	Macau Convention Center, Macau	4 November 2023	
	STAR FOR YOU MEETING CONCERT	Ballroom Hall 1–4, Queen Sirikit National Convention Center	2 December 2023	
	JAMFILM 1ST FAN MEETING IN JAPAN	Bellesalle Onarimon Tower Tokyo, Japan	9 December 2023	
2024	JAMFILM 1ST FAN MEETING IN HONG KONG	Rotunda 2, KITEC, Hong Kong	20 January 2024	
2024	ONE ฟิน เวอร์ ตอน Mystery Box Fan Concert	BCC Hall Central Ladprao	24 March 2024	
2024	Film Meet with you in Nanning, China	Nanning Houpeng Live	7 September 2024	
2024	FFF : Fan Film Fanmeeting	Lido Connect Hall 2 Siam Square	1 December 2024	
2025	Film Fansign in Shanghai	Shanghai	5 April 2025	

== Awards and nominations ==
He won his first award at the KAZZ awards 2019 for Mia 2018. He has been nominated three times at the Nataraja Awards and won Kom Chad Luek Award 2023 for Best Leading Actor in category of Television Drama from To Sir, with Love.

Year	Work	Award	Category	Result	Note	Refs.
2018	Mia 2018	MThai Top Talk About 2019	Top Talk-About Memorable Character 1	Won		
2018	Mia 2018	KAZZ AWARDS 2019	Boys of The Year 2019	Won		
2018	Mia 2018	The 10th Nataraja	Best Supporting Actor	Nominated		
2018	Mia 2018	Daradaily Awards 2018	The best male star of 2018	Nominated		
2018	Mia 2018	Line TV Awards 2019	Rising Star Rising Star of the Year	Nominated		
2020	The Passbook	Siam Series Awards 2021	Best Actor Award	Won		
2020	The Passbook	The 12th Nataraja	Best Leading Actor	Nominated		
2022		Japan Expo Thailand Awards 2022	Japan Expo Actor Award	Won		
2023	To Sir, with Love	2nd Pantip Television Awards	Best Leading Actor	Won		
2023	To Sir, with Love	19th Kom Chad Luek Award	Best Leading Actor, Television Drama	Won		
2023	To Sir, with Love	ChobAPP Awards 2022	THE MOST POPULAR MALE ARTIST	Won		
2023		HOWE AWARDS 2023	HOWE POPULAR ACTOR AWARD 2023	Won		
2023	Laws of Attraction	Y UNIVERSE AWARDS 2023	Award for Best Series, Best Leading Actor	Won		
2023	Laws of Attraction	CBLO AWARDS 2023	BEST BL ACTOR OF THE YEAR AWARD	Won	Organizer Philippines with Jam Rachata	
2023	Laws of Attraction	CBLO AWARDS 2023	BEST BL COUPLE OF THE YEAR AWARD	Won	Organizer Philippines with Jam Rachata	
2023		KAZZ AWARDS 2023	Boys of The Year 2023	Won		
2023		KAZZ AWARDS 2023	The Best Actor Of The Year	Nominated		
2023		NINEENTERTAIN AWARDS 2023	Actor of the Year	Nominated		
2023		The best Sanook of 2022	Popular Leading Actor of the Year	Nominated		
2023		MAYA TV AWARDS 2023	Leading Actor of the Year	Nominated		
2023	To Sir, with Love	The 14th Nataraja	Best Leading Actor, Short Form Category	Nominated		
2024	Laws of Attraction	Hub Awards 2023	Actor of the year	Won	Organizer Brazil	
2024	To Sir, with Love	Face of The Year Awards 2023	Popular international male actors	Nominated	Organizer Vietnam	
2024	Laws of Attraction	15th Nataraja Awards	Best Leading Actor	Nominated		
2025		The best Sanook of 2024	Best Actor of the Year	Won		
2025		Zoomdara Awards 2025	Best Male Actor	Won		
2025		WEIBO GALA 2025	Weibo Thailand Most Self-Breakthrough Artis	Won		
2025	The Empress of Ayodhaya	21st Komchadluek Awards	Best Leading Actor	Nominated		
2025	The Empress of Ayodhaya	16th Nataraja Awards	Best Leading Actor, Short Form Category	Nominated		
2025	The Empress of Ayodhaya	39th TV Gold Awards	Best Leading Actor	Nominated		
2025	The Empress of Ayodhaya	FEED X KHAOSOD AWARDS 2025	Best Actor of the Year	Nominated		
