= Laws of Attraction (2023 TV series) =

2023 Thai television series

- กฎแห่งรักดึงดูด
- Genre: Drama; Romance; Suspense; Crime
- Written by: Nueng Chawanon Sarapat; Oh Wantawil Suknoy; Sorawich Pinyomit; Thananant Kamsri
- Directed by: Wo Worawit Khuttiyayothin
- Starring: Thanapat Kawila; Rachata Hampanont
- Country of origin: Thailand
- Original language: Thai
- No. of episodes: 8

Production
- Running time: 51–61 minutes

Original release
- Network: One31
- Release: 15 July – 2 September 2023

Laws of Attraction (Thai: กฎแห่งรักดึงดูด) is a Thai television drama series that aired on One31 from July 15 to September 2, 2023. The series stars Thanapat Kawila (Film) and Rachata Hampanont (Jam) in lead roles.

== Synopsis ==
Charn is a sharp and calculating lawyer who thrives on high-profile cases that promise prestige and power. When he’s unexpectedly removed from a case that garners public attention, he suspects foul play and becomes determined to uncover the truth behind his dismissal. Driven by ambition and a thirst for justice or revenge Charn partners with Tinn, the uncle of Tonkhao, a young girl tragically killed in a hit-and-run incident that was never properly resolved. Together, they begin a dangerous investigation that reveals hidden motives and buried secrets. Despite their contrasting personalities, Charn and Tinn grow closer as they navigate the complexities of the case. As tensions rise and threats emerge, they realize that the truth they seek may be more perilous than they imagined and that their bond might be the only thing keeping them grounded.

== Cast ==
=== Main ===
- Thanapat Kawila as Charn Sangsathienpong
- Rachata Hampanont as Tinn Jitsomboon

=== Supporting ===
- Pearl Satjakorn Chalard as Methee
- See Parattakorn Kaiyanan as Thaenthai
- Vorarit Fuangarome (Not) as Thatthep
- Rasee Wacharapolmek (Organ) as Rose
- Duangdao Jarujinda (Dao) as Aew
- Gift Wattana Kumthorntip as Sorawit
- Mam Vichuda Pindum as Nam
- Silvy Pavida Moriggi as Maya
- Tee Somjet Charoenwatanan as Somphol
- Maki Machida Sutthikulphanich as Tonkhao

== Reception ==
The series received positive reviews for its blend of legal drama and romantic tension. According to Sanook, the show was praised for its “dark lawyer aesthetic” and strong chemistry between the leads. MGR Online highlighted the show’s unique narrative structure and emotional depth. Thairath covered the series extensively, including episode breakdowns and cast interviews.

=== Ratings ===
Episode	Air date	Time slot	Nielsen rating
1	July 15, 2023	Saturday 20:15	0.9
2	July 22, 2023	Saturday 20:15	0.7
3	July 29, 2023	Saturday 20:15	0.5
4	August 5, 2023	Saturday 20:15	0.6
5	August 12, 2023	Saturday 20:15	0.6
6	August 19, 2023	Saturday 20:15	0.6
7	August 26, 2023	Saturday 20:15	1.0
8	September 2, 2023	Saturday 20:15	1.0
Average rating			0.7
