= Peemapol Panichtamrong =

Thai actor (born 1999)

- ภีมพล พาณิชย์ธำรง
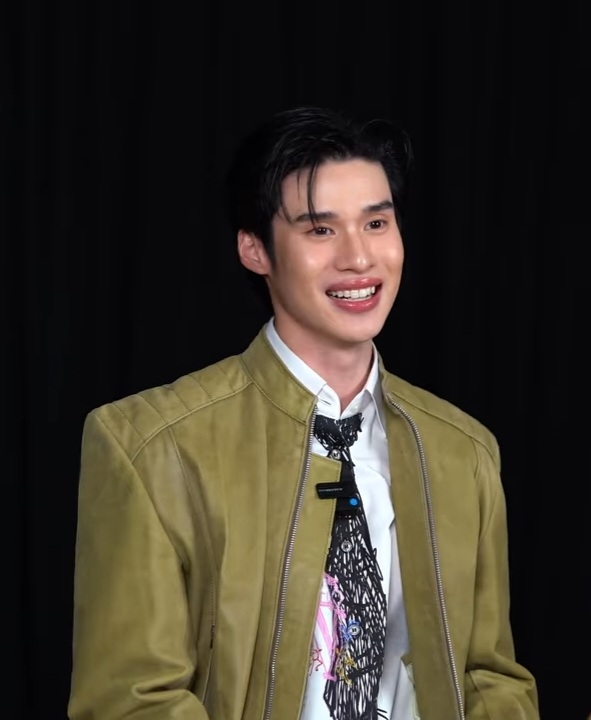
- Peak in October 2025
- Born: 11 November 1999 (age 27); Bangkok, Thailand
- Other name: Peak (พีค)
- Education: King Mongkut's Institute of Technology Ladkrabang
- Occupation: Actor
- Years active: 2016–present

Peemapol Panichtamrong (Thai: ภีมพล พาณิชย์ธำรง; born 11 November 1999), nicknamed Peak (Thai: พีค), is a Thai actor. He is known for his role as Fuse in the BL drama Make It Right (2016) and as Prince Saenkaew in the 2025 BL drama Love in the Moonlight.

== Early life and education ==
Panichtamrong was born at Chulalongkorn Hospital. He has a younger brother, Vic Vittawin, who is also an actor.

He graduated from Assumption College in Bangkok in 2018 and earned his bachelor's degree in Industrial Engineering and Management Systems (International Program) from the Faculty of Engineering, King Mongkut's Institute of Technology Ladkrabang in 2022.

== Career ==
Peemapol began his acting career in 2016 when he was cast as Fuse in the Thai BL series Make It Right. He later reprised the role in Make It Right 2 (2017).

In 2018, he participated in the third season of the Chinese reality program Tài yǒumíng – Thai Famous (泰有名).

In 2020, he appeared in the film Please (Her) as Bew, a role that earned him a Bangkok Critics Assembly award. The same year, he made a guest appearance in the BL series Why R U?.

In 2021, he starred as Wit in the drama series Man Ni Thirak (มันนี่ธีรก), broadcast on Thai PBS.

In 2022, he played the lead role of Tap in the series Rhythm of Life (จังหวะชีวิต), also aired by Thai PBS. He also appeared in a supporting role in My Only 12% (2022).

In 2025, he starred as Prince Saenkaew in the BL period drama Love in the Moonlight, which aired on One 31.

== Filmography ==
=== Television ===
Year	Title	Role	Network	Notes	Ref.
2016	Make It Right	Fuse	MCOT HD	Main role	
2016	Haunted	Pong	MCOT HD	Main role (Ep. 11)	
2017	Make It Right 2	Fuse	Line TV	Main role	
2017	Love Songs Love Series: Please Send Someone to Love Me	Khenni	GMM 25	Supporting role	
2018	Beauty Boy	Yodia	Channel 3	Guest role	
2018	Dream Teen	Fix	Thai PBS	Supporting role	
2019	Make It Live: On the Beach	Fuse	Line TV	Main role	
2020	Why R U?	Fuse	One 31	Guest role (Ep. 2)	
2020	My Quarantine Days	Pan	Thai PBS	Main role	
2020	Hook	"Man" Poramet Kiatkriangkrai	GMM25	Main role	
2020	You Never Eat Alone	Diew	AIS Play	Main role	
2021	Man Ni Thirak	Wit	Thai PBS	Main role	
2021	7 Project	"Tonnam" Kamolphob Kiatworakun	iQIYI	Main role	
2022	Rhythm of Life	Tap	Thai PBS	Main role	
2022	My Only 12%	Kung	iQIYI	Supporting role	
2023	Sweet Sensory	Boem	Thai PBS	Supporting role	
2023	Dinosaur Love	Sim	Amarin TV	Guest role	
2023	Nameless Angel	Professor Dr. Ukrit Mongkolnavin	Thai PBS	Supporting role	
2024	Sweet Sensory 2	Boem	Thai PBS	Supporting role	
2025	My Dream is Fencing	Sun	Thai PBS	Main role	
2025	Swag Couple		Channel 3	Guest role	
2025	Riak Chan Than Prathan		One Playgound	Guest role	
2025	Love in the Moonlight	Prince Saenkaew	One 31	Main role	
2026	Flower Boy	Kaysorn	One 31	Main role	
TBA	คุณชายอนันตศัย Anantasaya: Our Love Stories		One 31	Main role	

=== Film ===
Year	Title	Role
2020	Please (Her)	Bew

=== Music video appearances ===
Year	Song title	Artist(s)	Role	Ref.
2016	"ไม่อยากมีความรัก"	Gun Achi	Fuse	
2025	"เข็มวินาที"	Surawin Phuwanphanthanaphat	Sun	
2025	"ครั้งหนึ่งตลอดไป"	Boom Saharat		

== Discography ==
=== Singles ===
==== As lead artist ====
Year	Title	Label	Notes	Ref.
2021	"ที่เดิมที่เปลี่ยนไป"	Neon Music	Joox Original Fankrub	

==== Soundtrack appearances ====
Year	Title	Album	Label	Ref.
2016	"ความรักทั้งเจ็ด" (with Make It Right cast)	Make It Right OST	GMM Grammy Official	
2017	ขอใครสักคน"	Make It Right Season 2 OST	GMMTV Records	
2017	"ไม่อยากมีความรัก" (with Boom Krittapak)	Make It Right Season 2 OST	GMMTV Records	
2021	"ไม่เหมือนใคร" (with Zee Pruk)	You Never Eat Alone OST	Copy A Bangkok	
2021	"ไอ้ความเหงา"	You Never Eat Alone OST	Copy A Bangkok	
2021	"โดนตก (Crush On You)" (with Book Krittapak)	7 Project OST	Neon Music	
2022	"Dream Together" (with Biw, Guncharlie)	Rhythm of Life OST	Thai PBS	
2026	"ซ่อนกลิ่น"	Flower Boy OST	One Music	
2026	"ทฤษฎีความรัก"	Make It Right 2026 OST	Copy A Bangkok	

== Awards and nominations ==
Award nominations for Peemapol Panichtamrong
Year	Award	Category	Nominee(s)	Result	Ref.
2021	Bangkok Critics Assembly	Best Supporting Actor	Please (Her)	Won	
2026	Hub Awards	Best Performance: Actor	Love in the Moonlight	Won	
2026	Pattaya International Film Festival 2026	Outstanding Rising BL Actor	Love in the Moonlight (with Satjakorn Chalard)	Won	
2026	Praew Awards 2026	Popular Couple of the Year	with Satjakorn Chalard	Won	
