= Satjakorn Chalard =

Thai actor (born 1998)

- ศัจกร ฉลาด
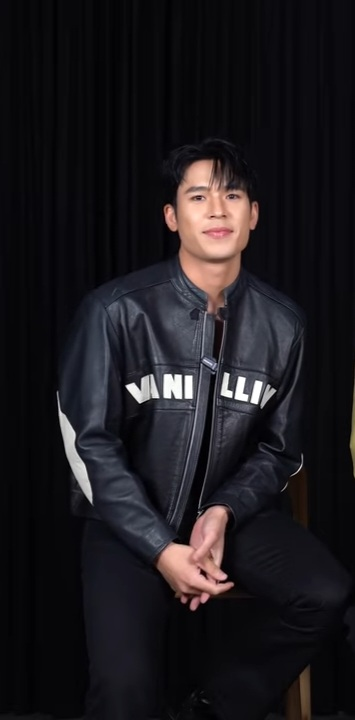
- Satjakorn in October 2025
- Born: 19 February 1998 (age 28); Thailand
- Other name: Pearl (เพิร์ล)
- Education: Mahidol University – College of Science and Sports Technology
- Occupation: Actor
- Years active: 2020–present
- Agent: One31
- Known for: Love in the Moonlight (2025); Flower Boy (2026); Bangkok Blossom (2024); Laws of Attraction (2023)

Satjakorn Chalard (Thai: ศัจกร ฉลาด; born 19 February 1998), nicknamed Pearl (Thai: เพิร์ล), is a Thai actor. He is known for his roles in the series Love in the Moonlight (2025), Flower Boy (2026), Bangkok Blossom (2024), and Laws of Attraction (2023), all broadcast by One31. He graduated from Mahidol University in science and sports technology, and was previously a tennis athlete.

== Career ==
Satjakorn began his acting career in 2020 when he was introduced as a new talent by One31. After appearing in dramas such as When the Sky Falls and Revenge from the Past, he gained recognition for his role as Thee Methee in Laws of Attraction (2023).

In 2024, he joined the cast of the historical drama Bangkok Blossom, playing the supporting role of Nat.

He rose to prominence with his lead role as Sasin in the BL period drama Love in the Moonlight (2025). The series aired on One31 and was distributed internationally by GagaOOLala.

In April 2026, he reunited with co-star Peemapol Panichtamrong (Peak) in the fantasy romance BL series Flower Boy, which premiered on 25 April 2026 on One31.

== Filmography ==
=== Television series ===
| Year | Title | Role | Network | Notes | Ref. |
|---|---|---|---|---|---|
| 2019 | Don't Sleep My Hero | Maggie | True4U | Supporting role | |
| 2022 | Pen Tor 2022 | Sand | One31 | Guest role (Ep. 10, 26, 36, 43) | |
| 2022 | Revenge from the Past | Pong | One31 | Supporting role | |
| 2022 | When the Sky Falls | Insee | One31 | Supporting role | |
| 2023 | Laws of Attraction | "Thee" Methee | One31 | Supporting role | |
| 2023 | Pen Tor 2023 | Sand | One31 | Guest role (Ep. 3, 6, 17, 35, 41) | |
| 2024 | Bangkok Blossom | Nat | One31 | Supporting role | |
| 2025 | Love in the Moonlight | Sasin | One31 | Main role | |
| 2026 | Flower Boy | "Scent" Phummarak Sukontawanich | One31 | Main role | |
| TBA | คุณชายอนันตศัย Anantasaya: Our Love Stories | | One31 | Main role | |

== Awards and nominations ==
Award nominations for Satjakorn Chalard
| Year | Award | Category | Nominee(s) | Result | Ref. |
|---|---|---|---|---|---|
| 2026 | Pattaya International Film Festival 2026 | Outstanding Rising BL Actor | Love in the Moonlight (with Peemapol Panichtamrong) | Won | |
| 2026 | Praew Awards 2026 | Popular Couple of the Year | with Peemapol Panichtamrong | Won | |
