= Make It Right (TV series) =

2016–17 Thai television series

- Title card
- Genre: Friendship, Romance, Youth
- Directed by: Rachyd Kusolkulsiri
- Starring: Panichtamrong Peemapol; Udompanich Krittapak
- Opening theme: "I Believe True Love Exists" (Thai: เชื่อว่ารักแท้มีจริง) sung by Gun Achi
- Ending theme: "About Last Night" (Thai: เรื่องเมื่อคืน) sung by Tea Namcha
- Country of origin: Thailand
- Original language: Thai
- No. of seasons: 2
- No. of episodes: 26

Production
- Camera setup: Multiple-camera setup
- Running time: 45 minutes
- Production companies: Copy 'A Bangkok; COSOCOMO CO., Ltd; JINLOE MEDIA WORK

Original release
- Network: MCOT HD; Line TV
- Release: May 15, 2016 – August 5, 2017

Related
- Love Sick

Make It Right: The Series (Thai: รักออกเดิน; RTGS: Rak Ok Doen) is a 2016 Thai boys’ love romantic comedy series aired on MCOT HD and Line TV. The series is based from the novel of the same name, and is broadcast on Sundays from 20:50 to 21:45 (BST) on MCOT HD, while the uncut version is shown on Line TV during midnight of the same day. The first season consisted of a total of 12 episodes and began airing on 15 May 2016 until 31 July 2016. The story revolves around young boys’ budding relationships and how they deal with their feelings within themselves against a judgemental society. The main couple is played by Panichtamrong Peemapol as Fuse and Udompanich Krittapak as Tee. A second and last season from 7 May 2017 until 5 August 2017 with total of 14 episodes.

== Cast and characters ==
=== Main ===
- Panichtamrong Peemapol (Peak) as Fuse
- Krittapak Udompanich (Boom) as Tee
- Pawat Chittsawangdee (Ohm) as Frame
- Imerbpathom Sittiwat (Toey) as Book
- Techakumphu Manapat (Bonne) as Nine
- Wongsamran Sutiwas (Aof) as Yok
- Ratanaumnuayshai Boonyakorn (Beam) as Rodtang

=== Supporting ===
- Chanchalerm Manasaporn (Proy) as Fing
- Ua-Ampon Wichawet (Bright) as Tan
- Sukpun Rattaporn (Praew) as Mook
- Rathavit Kijworalak (Plan) as Wit
- Nonthanee Jirapun (Guy) as Ess
- Somkid Vichapol (Nice) as Lukmo
- Inthapuch Banyada (Tonson) as Jean
- Phiravich Attachitsataporn (Mean) as Champ
- Mil Sarut as Dew

== Episodes ==
Chapter No.	Title	Cast	Time Duration	Original Date Released
Chapter 1	'PROLOGUE' "If you're not trying. How do you know whats right."	Peek Peampol, Boom Krittapak, Ohm Pawat, Toey Sittiwat, Tonson Bandaya, Praew Rattaporn	43:11 Minutes	May 15, 2016
We start with our lead (Fuse) vlogging about his heart broken state.He explains that he saw his girlfriend (Jean) hanging out with another guy at the mall (poor Fuse) and is conflicted on how to react to this situation. Then, we cut to the school, where his best friend name is Mo (or Lukmo). He asks Fuse why is he sad. It's flashback time. Apparently, his gf was stuck in a bathroom the previous day and called him for help but when he went there his bae was hanging out with this new hot dude! Anyway, then we see the meet-cute between Fuse and Tee. Even though they don't talk, then Fuse and his friends (not Tee) go drinking. Fuse's other half Tee is there. And of course, Fuse gets drunk and, Tee is there to take him home but he doesn't know where he lives. He ends up taking him to his house. In Tee's room, we can see that Fuse is really drunk. When Tee takes off his shirt to shower, Fuse comments on how good looking he is. After that, things get really romantic and steamy when he asks Tee whether he has had sex with a guy. Tee responds with a no and suggests that they should try it.
Chapter 2	"Pain is a signal to letting go"	Peek Peampol, Boom Krittapak, Ohm Pawat, Toey Sittiwat, Tonson Bandaya, Praew Rattaporn	48:34 Minutes	May 22, 2016
So, it turns out Fuse is not happy. He even blames poor Tee for everything. Tee is visibly sad and Fuse can see that and is a little bit concerned but doesn't do anything and leaves. It starts with Fuse's ass face, which somehow leads to a farting contest between the boys to find out if they're gay or not and ends in Fuse's shit splashing noises After that, Fuse gets a call from Jean who wants to go the mall and watch movies. As a loyal and dutiful boyfriend, he obliges. In the cinema, the movie that they're watching turns out to have a similar plot to the drama that's happening between Fuse and Jean. So, obviously Fuse (he with the tender heart) is very emotional and cries like a baby. Jean, on the other hand, doesn't seem to care (she is busy texting). But, Jean never know that Tee is here and they secretly hold hands with Fuse and Tee provides the moral and emotional support that Fuse obviously needs.
Chapter 3	"Don't remember the day we've loved. Remember that today are we still love each other?"	Peek Peampol, Boom Krittapak, Ohm Pawat, Toey Sittiwat, Tonson Bandaya, Praew Rattaporn	46:43 Minutes	May 29, 2016
Apparently, Fuse feels bad and immediately apologizes. However, Tee is still pissed and is ignoring both Fuse's phone calls and his friendly hellos in the school. Fuse has to stay late at school to finish his homework and suddenly, the lights go out and he is trapped. But at the same time, Tee comes there to rescue him. During that time, they have a heart-to-heart and it turns out Tee is not angry but feels guilty for taking advantage of Fuse's drunkenness. Fuse, on the other hand, doesn't think so and blames himself. And, just like that their little feud is over for now and happiness returns. They then go to Fuse's house, where they meet Fuse's sister. She warns them not to get too close (through her own weird way) otherwise they might not be able to handle what comes next. So, while in bed, Fuse kisses Tee to prove that he doesn't feel a thing and a kiss is just a kiss. BUT THEN, Tee kisses back and confesses that he definitely feels something when they kiss and won't forget it anytime soon
Chapter 4	'Don't "cheat on" a person who have you as their whole lives.'	Peek Peampol, Boom Krittapak, Ohm Pawat, Toey Sittiwat, Tonson Bandaya, Praew Rattaporn	43:11 Minutes	June 5, 2016
We see all the boys having lunch at the cafeteria. All of a sudden, Tee just waltzes in like he owns the place and not just takes the chair but drags it and sits besides Fuse as if they are already dating (slowly getting there). Obviously, everyone is intrigued but Tee isn't afraid and confesses openly that he likes Fuse and wants to go to his house later (although, he does say later that he was kidding but of course, that's a lie). Anyway, during this whole thing, Fuse protests feebly but inside, we know that he likes Tee and wants all of this to happen. When the bell rings and it's time to go home, he straight away runs to Tee and asks him to go home together. And at his house, we see a cute montage of them being cute and doing cute things together. Again, Tee confesses that he's very happy when he's with Fuse. Fuse, as usual, remains silent (but happy). And then, they are about to kiss BUT at the same moment Fuse's damn sister opens the room and interrupts them. Then, the morning after, we get introduced to Tee's love rival – Rodtang*. Tee and Fuse are late and meet Rod in the punishment zone. Rod openly flirts with Fuse and Tee isn't impressed. But, this clearly doesn't stop Rod. He is very enterprising and uses every opportunity available to flirt with Fuse. While he is practicing in the music room, he sees Fuse and calls him to participate. They seem to have a good time and make a video of them singing together and being all touchy-touchy.
Chapter 5	'Disappointment because of "love" is nature's way to strengthen our hearts'	-	43:06 Minutes	June 12, 2016
Our main couple starts out great but ends quite badly. Tee finds Fuse outside of his class eating that sponsored roll thingy. They chat, flirt a little bit and Tee manages to steal a kiss from Fuse. It is quite adorable. The most adorable part, however, was Fuse's reaction. He is really really happy. Naturally, someone must be there to witness it and this time around its Mo, the friend. He is visibly shocked and offers an honest advice to Fuse about gay relationships. Fuse is also not sure what all of this means. He is still new to it and processing his feelings. In the meantime, he finds out that Jean (his gf) is at his house waiting for him. He is not happy. He goes there and Jean guilt trips him on kissing her. At the same moment, Tee appears and sees the whole shebang. He's clearly heartbroken and leaves. Fuse runs after him but it's too late (for now). Book and Frame Book and Frame had the most interesting plot out of all three in this episode. For their project, they go to interview a prostitute. In the end, when the lady invites Frame to stay over, Book gets possessive and drags Frame away from there. During their talk, we also find out that Frame is quite the Casanova and these things are normal for him but clearly Book doesn't want him going with other people. Afterwards, we also get a short glimpse of Book's girlfriend (who is horrible) and their break up. It seems very casual but still it rattles our Book who turns to a hookup app and sets up a clandestine meeting with another boy.
Chapter 6	"Some friend is a gift, Some friend is a lesson."	-	48:22 Minutes	June 19, 2016
=== Book and Frame === In Book and Frame's case, we see that Frame is really drunk when these two decide to hook up in a hotel.We also saw that Book lives away from his parents and his father seems to be an abusive husband to his mother. He has a problem about the break up and We see his motivation to go and chat on a gay app and meet up and try to have a gay sex. Unexpected happens that the guy who was chatting Book was Frame. In the morning after the things happen between them though, everything appears to be fine. In the shower, Book is reminiscing about Frame through flashbacks and Frame seemed happy as well. Anyway, while showering Book starts bleeding a little and they go to a hospital immediately. Frame is quite concerned here and we see the good side of him. He holds his hand and gives him advice how to behave in a one-night stand (this was quite funny). He also tells Book that he's bisexual and starts chatting to other people on the phone. This makes Book pretty jealous. When Frame is dropping off Book to his house, Frame tries to kiss Book and ask him out on a date but Book seems hesitant. === Tee and Fuse === We then move to Tee and Fuse. Due to some parking problem or something, Tee and Fuse are in the same place at the same time. It is so adorable to see Fuse get excited when he learns this and he immediately goes to talk to him. In the way, he gets hit by basketball (thrown by Tee, no less) and they go to the nurse's office together. There's no one there and Tee performs the first aid. It is a cute moment but Tee then realizes that he's still hurt from the night before and is a little bit angry. He realizes that he needs to get away from Fuse because he won't be able to handle it if he stays there. It is then time to go home. Fuse gets a call from Tee's friend, who is concerned that Tee isn't acting normal and tells Fuse to take care of him. He's pretty happy to receive that call and to be associated with Tee. Now, he just needs to realize that he loves Tee and not Jean and everything will be okay. Then, he sees Tee and begs him to let him go to his house. In the end, Tee gives in and they go to his house. We see that Fuse is still confused (even though he just had something happen with Tee) but Tee is not. He says to Fuse that he is the most important person in his life right now.
Chapter 7	"What is worth more than a promise is a simple word but action."	-	55:01 Minutes	June 26, 2016
=== Book and Frame === First, let's get Book and Frame out of the way. So, things seem to be getting back to normal between them. Book is clearly in love with Frame but Frame is still wishy-washy about it. He shows concern but still doesn't confess or commit to Book properly. In the school scene, we can see that Book clearly cares for Frame as he brings water for him and has that longing look in his eyes. But, in another scene, Frame is playful but doesn't accompany Book to watch the documentary and chats with another girl right in front Book. We will see how it goes in the future for these two. === Tee and Fuse === Another story line that got introduced this episode was of Tee's brother and Fuse's sister. Apparently, Tee's brother likes Fuse's sister but she doesn't like him. Her friend though seems to like him instead. Hetero love confuses me. Now, back to the main story, Fuse is quite concerned about Tee and is wondering why he's avoiding him. And, in a surprising development, Fuse confesses to Tee about all his feelings. He says he likes Tee and his touch and sees him as more than a friend. And, Tee of course tells him that he feels the same way. He tells him about the kiss he saw between Fuse and Jean and how it affected him. After all the things happens to them, they are late to go to school and instead spend the day going out and about and eating. There's an awkward moment when Jean also appears in the mall but the rest is them being cute and cuddly. They go home late and get scolded (playfully) by Fuse's mother. Tee asks to stay the night and they have a lovely family dinner.
Chapter 8	"Sometimes we have to faced some bad days because they help us to realize the value of good days in our lives."	-	59:08 Minutes	July 3, 2016
=== Book and Frame === We start with Book and Frame first. Frame visits Book in his condo and basically, apologizes for his behavior earlier (you know, for that thing that he did). We also learn that Book has recently broken up with his girlfriend and has dated a guy in the past (which didn't go too well). On the other hand, Frame is completely into Book. He is constantly trying to vie for his attention, compliments him and after hearing about his failed date with another guy, tells him to try again and date him. We also get a scene where he describes Book as a beautiful star, how he is perfect and how he is totally attracted to Book. Then they go to the mall where Frame is quite forward and flirty and Book plays coy and just smiles sheepishly every time. === Yok and Dew === The second pairing of this episode – Yok and Dew continues to be annoying. They are vacationing in Yok's dad's resort. Yok is excited to spend time with Dew but it turns out Dew just thinks of Yok as a friend and isn't even gay. Yok is understandably upset but his mom comes in the picture causing even more drama. They create a scene where Yok's mother scolds him for bringing a guy to the resort and chastises Dew for being a greedy gold-digger. They all leave the resort unhappy and looking sad. === Tee and Fuse === Tee and Fuse are also on holiday this episode at the same resort. Fuse's family is there (with Tee) to surprise Fuse's dad. In the hotel room where they are staying, a small boy comes in saying that he is instructed to give free dessert to couples and that's why he has come here. The child is super chill and just accepts the fact that a M/M relationship is normal and that Tee and Fuse are a couple. Tee and Fuse have come to a stage in their ‘relationship’ where they don't even deny it and then go onto this whole ritual of feeding each other those sweets as a couple. In a different scene, they start talking about their relationship. Tee is still concerned about Fuse and how he has a girlfriend and how that complicates things. So, he does not want to hurt Fuse by continuing this ‘relationship’. But Fuse tells him to not do that and not let things get between them. He tells him to listen to his heart and just be happy. === Nine and Rodtang === This episode features the developing relationship between Nine and Rodtang. Nine, the vice-president of the music club, invites Rodtang to attend a club practice. Rodtang agrees on the condition that Nine takes him to a park. The two spend the day together at the park, where they talk.
Chapter 9	"A person who really loves you is not the one who is in your life, but the one who will never leave you."	Peek Peampol, Boom Krittapak, Ohm Pawat, Toey Sittiwat, Tonson Bandaya, Praew Rattaporn, Aof Sutiwas, Nice Vichapol, Beam Boonyakorn, Bonne Manapat	50:08 Minutes	July 10, 2016
=== Book and Frame === After boys Teasing Fuse about between Frame goes to Book and starts being all cutesy and asks what he can buy for him from cafeteria. Now obviously, The Boys start to tease them about and unlike Fuse, Book isn't happy. Seeing Book's discomfort, Frame reprimands the boys but the damage is already done. Book gets really angry and blames Frame for telling their secret to them. Bring all the angst! === Tee - Fuse, Nine and Rodtang === Nine is conducting some sort of band practice and is fed up with Rodtang as he's not following orders. Then, Fuse turns up at the practice scene as a substitute and tells Nine not to worry and that he can convince Rod to practice. Rod is obviously very happy to see Fuse and is ready to teach Fuse how to turn those large-stick-with-balls-at-the-top type thingy. He also utilizes this opportunity to flirt with Fuse. They have a sort of ‘intimate’ moment and at the same time Tee appears and witnesses the whole thing. He is not happy. But, in the end, Fuse manages to win him over and make him smile again with his funny antics. And, Fuse, Tee, Nine, and Rod all decide to go to dinner together. === Yok and His Mother === In the next scene, we get a quick update about Yok. His mother as usual is not happy that Yok is fooling around with guys. So, she seems to recruit Mo's girlfriend to seduce him. It's going to be such a fail. Can't wait to see this plan backfire. Back to the main story, those four guys are all having dinner and Rod continues to flirt with Fuse but thankfully, Nine holds back Rod from coming too much in between Tee and Fuse. When it's time to go back, we get one of the greatest Tee Fuse scenes ever – the bus scene. Basically, it's a crowded bus and Tee takes this opportunity to hold Fuse's hand while Fuse rests his head on Tee's chest/shoulder. During the ride, Tee asks Fuse if he has feelings for Rod and Fuse makes it clear that he only has eyes for Tee. Now, throughout the episode, Nine and Rod continue to flirt with each other. Nine was quite happy to tell him that Fuse has a lover and he shouldn't waste his time. When Rod forgets his keys to his condo, he comes over to Nine's house to sleep. Rod tells Nine that he will stop pursuing Fuse and basically, just calls Nine his hero. And, to my surprise, Nine fist pumps the air and celebrates this victory.
Chapter 10	"We didn't break up because we couldn't love each other, but it might be because we didn't love each other."	Peek Peampol, Boom Krittapak, Ohm Pawat, Toey Sittiwat, Tonson Bandaya, Praew Rattaporn, Aof Sutiwas, Nice Vichapol, Beam Boonyakorn, Bonne Manapat	47:02 Minutes	July 17, 2016
Tee's brother Fuse's sister That girl So, in this episode, we learn that ‘That girl’ likes Fuse's sister and Fuse's sister doesn't like that ‘That girl’ likes her. Apparently, she has known about this for a while and just wants to be friends. Meanwhile, Tee's brother is oblivious to this fact and interjects himself in their conversation and tries to act all cute and flirty. It just results in awkward situation between the three of them. The whole thing ends in a heartbreak with ‘That girl’ crying alone in a storage room as Tee's sister clearly doesn't like her that way. Book Frame The ongoing fight between Book and Frame continues this episode as well (escalates more even). It's just one misunderstanding after another. Book is in the classroom cleaning with some of The Boys being start to tease Book about his ‘relationship’ with Frame. Book gets really pissed and starts to yell and asks whether it was Frame who told them about their ‘relationship’. The Boys quickly apologize seeing Book's anger and explain that Frame had nothing to do with it and they just saw how close Frame and Book had become and were just joking. This calms Book down and he realizes his mistake. However, this happiness doesn't last for long. He calls Frame and sets up a meeting at the Siam. He also buys some CD and greeting card as an apology. But, when he goes there, he sees Frame holding hands with another girl and just loses it. He screams at Frame and blames him for – well – everything. Now, we know that Frame was just helping out his auntie and there is nothing going on between them. Had Book been a rational person and just trusted Frame and asked him about this situation, none of this would have happened. Tee Fuse Jean Rodtang Jean comes to visit Fuse and brings lots of goodies with her. At the same time, Tee brings a ‘strawberry smoothie’ and other snacks as well. It's basically the high-school version of impressing and seducing your bae with as much things as you can buy. Fuse, of course, is just enjoying this attention and tries to please both of them. This gets even more complicated when Rodtang arrives for the band practice and there are three of them vying for his attention. Poor Rodtang gets distraught when he finds out that Fuse really IS going out with a girl. Last episode, he just heard it but this episode, he witnessed it live. Meanwhile, Tee is over this situation for now. He isn't happy and tries to put a distance between him and Fuse. On the other hand, Fuse acts all stupid and tries to be cutesy and convince Tee to spend time with him. Rodtang Nine The only relationship that showed signs of working was that of Rodtang and Nine. Rod is heartbroken. But, Nine comes to the rescue and gives Rod the much needed company. Here, Rod realizes that Nine has always been there for him (unlike Fuse) and he's been ignoring Nine and pursuing something that wasn't right for him.
Chapter 11	"You can be mad, but don't be for too long."	Peek Peampol, Boom Krittapak, Ohm Pawat, Toey Sittiwat, Beam Boonyakorn, Bonne Manapat,	51:10 Minutes	July 24, 2016
The penultimate episode of MIR starts where the previous one had ended – with Rodtang mourning over Fuse and Nine being there for him. They talk and bond. Nine is completely smitten but Rod is not quite there yet (he's getting there slowly). This is illustrated by the bizarre dream sequence where Nine is the fisherman and Rod's the fish. He doesn't seem too happy to be with Nine in the dream. However, this is all about to change. Rod and Nine go to a storage room to store those amazingly-amazing band-stick thingies. It's there where Nine ‘saves’ Rod from a falling box and literally becomes his hero. And obviously, he gets injured while doing so and obviously, it's Rod who performs the first aid. This brings them even more closer. On the other side, Fuse is still being clingy and stalking Tee on Facebook. He sends him a text but doesn't get a reply and gets a – ‘I'm busy and I have to study’ – when he calls him. So naturally, like any other person, he questions his busy-ness with the Facebook evidence and blames Tee for ignoring him. Anyway, the next day it's his turn to ignore Tee. Tee tries really hard to talk to him but Fuse acts like a total diva and blatantly tells him not to disturb him. His smug and satisfied look was quite funny to watch. But, we all know that they love each other and we can see that both are hurt and in pain when they are apart. Although, I'm not worried as it's like The Boys said – This is a fight between a married couple. They will sort it out themselves and we shouldn't intervene. Meanwhile, the story of Book and Frame progressed a lot in this episode. At first, Book still refused to talk to Frame but Frame ingeniously partnered up with Book in a class project where they finally had a chance to talk and figure out the misunderstanding. It's there where Book admits to his feelings for Frame and Frame also opens up his heart to Book and tells him not to break it. For context, this was because Frame (like Book) also had his heart broken before by a girl.
Chapter 12	"Last Episode of the Series 1"	Peek Peampol, Boom Krittapak, Ohm Pawat, Toey Sittiwat, Tonson Bandaya, Praew Rattaporn, Aof Sutiwas, Nice Vichapol, Beam Boonyakorn, Bonne Manapat	48:52 Minutes	July 31, 2016
In this finale, we see some couple start their love journey, some reconcile after their fight, while some go their separate ways. The director ties up some loose threads and also sows seed for story lines for the next season. Let's start with Frame and Book. They are given the shortest amount of screen time in the finale but they also get the most cutest scenes of them all. It's all about that honeymoon phase after the confession for them. They stare at each other lovingly, Book brings Frame food, feeds him, kisses him, etc. Our other couple (Rod and Nine) also continue to act cute. Rod brings Nine a gift (a hybrid of Nine's face and batman's body) and tells him he appreciates his kindness and thanks him for being his hero. The couple for whom things don't work out is the one with Lokmo and the other girl and the love triangle with the two girls and P’Tan. We have been anticipating Mo's break up for a while after we saw his girlfriend getting offered a job to seduce Yok by Yok's mother but it was still painful nonetheless. Last episode, Tee and Fuse were fighting but like any two people in love they just can't stay away from each other. Fuse finds himself in front of Tee's house after school and after hesitating for a few seconds decides to go in. They come face to face but apart from staring lovingly, they don't talk to each other and all we are left with is the incoherent love lorn talk of the drunk P’Tan. The next morning, Fuse arrives early at school and decides to sing a song and with the power of Fuse's love and the power of music, Tee instinctively knows it's Fuse calling him, sings with him (from the grounds outside) and sprints towards the music room. Tee doesn't go in but just listens from outside with love and satisfaction in his eyes. Fuse finishes the song, reminisces about the past encounters with Tee and comes outside but Tee has vanished. The whole day Fuse is sad and lost and keeps remembering the amazing moments that he had with Tee. The show (and the story) comes full circle when later, Fuse finds himself locked in the same spot where he was locked in the beginning of the series. He is heartbroken and cries reminiscing about the good old days. And, the episode ends with our main hero – Tee – coming at the right time to rescue him with that infectious smile of his and a warm hug.

== Production ==
The series is based on the novel of the same name. It was broadcast on Sundays from 20:50 to 21:45 (Bangkok Standard Time) on MCOT HD, while the uncut version is shown on Line TV during midnight of the same day. The first season consisted of a total of 12 episodes with an average span of 45–55 minutes each. The series started its airing on 15 May 2016, and the first season ended on 31 July 2016.

== Soundtrack ==
The following soundtrack below that used in Make it right: The series is with no particular order.

No.	Title	Artist	Length
1.	"I Believe True Love" (เชื่อว่ารักแท้มีจริง)	Gun Achi (GMMTV Records, 2016)[1]
2.	"About Last Night" (เรื่องเมื่อคืน)	Tea Namcha (GMMTV Records, 2016)[2]
3.	"Love Has Gone" (ความรักทั้งเจ็ด)	Love Seven (GMM GRAMMY, 2016)[3]
4.	"I Miss This" (อย่าทำให้ฟ้าผิดหวัง)	Endorphine (GMM GRAMMY, 2016)
5.	"Would You Love Me?" (เธอจะรักฉันได้ไหม)	INSTINCT (GMM GRAMMY, 2016)
6.	"You Need Me" (เธอต้องมีฉัน)	Tattoo Colour (SmallRoom, 2016)
7.	"Can't Hug You" (กอดไม่ได้)	Toey Sittiwat (Crispy Sound, 2016)[4]
8.	"That Person" (ใครคนนั้น)	Bedroom Audio (Crispy Sound, 2016)
9.	"miss" (พลาด)	Endorphine (GMM GRAMMY, 2016)
10.	"Attractive people" (คนมีเสน่ห์)	Pang Nakarin (Genierock, 2016)
11.	"Love Doesn't Need Time" (รักไม่ต้องการเวลา)	Klear (Genierock, 2009)

NOTE:

- I Believe True Love Exists (Thai: เชื่อว่ารักแท้มีจริง) by Gun Achi (GMMTV Records, 2016)
- About Last Night (Thai: เรื่องเมื่อคืน ) by Tea Namcha (GMMTV Records, 2016)
- Love Has Gone (Thai: ความรักทั้งเจ็ด ) by Love Seven (GMM GRAMMY, 2016)
- Can't Hug You (Thai: กอดไม่ได้) by Toey Sittiwat (Crispy Sound, 2016)
