= 9MCOT =

Thai free-to-air television network

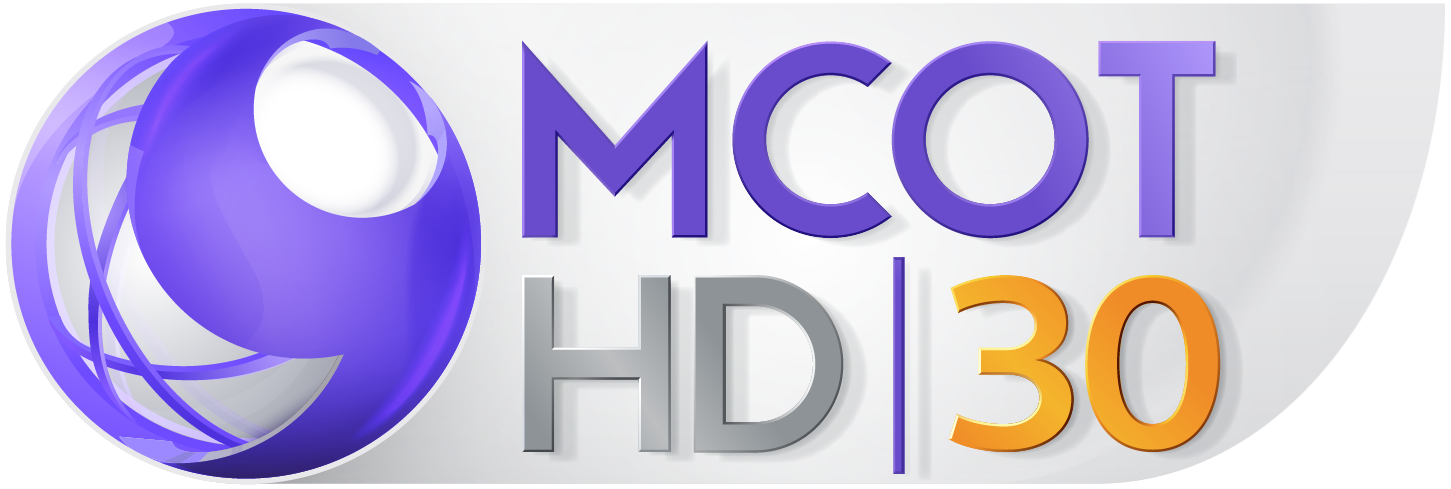
- Logo used since late 2018
- Country: Thailand
- Network: MCOT
- Headquarters: Huai Khwang, Bangkok

Programming
- Languages: Thai and English
- Picture format: 1080i HDTV

Ownership
- Owner: MCOT PCL
- Sister channels: Channel 3 (1970-2020); MCOT Family (2014-2019); MCOT1 (2007-2017); MCOT2 (2007-2009); MCOT World (2012-2016); MCOT News 24 (2007)

History
- Launched: 24 June 1955; 71 years ago
- Replaced: Thai Television Channel 4 (1955–1974)
- Former names: Thai Color Television Channel 9 (1975–1983); 9MCOT (Thai Color Television Channel 9 MCOT) (1984–2002); Modernine TV (2002–2015)

Links
- Website: mcot.net

Availability

Terrestrial
- Digital: Channel 30 (HD) (MCOT MUX3)

Streaming media
- Watch live: tv.mcot.net/index

9MCOT (Thai: ช่อง 9 เอ็มคอตเอชดี) is a Thai state-owned commercial free-to-air television network launched on 24 June 1955. It is owned by MCOT.

== History ==
In 1949, Sanpasiri Wirayasiri, a foreign correspondent for the Publicity Department (now the Public Relations Department), wrote an article to introduce readers to "Visual Radio", a new type of communication technology emerging worldwide at the time. Later, around 1950, the Department of Publicity sent a group of civil servants to study in the United Kingdom, having recognized the enormous benefits for the nation. The department then presented a "Project to establish radiotelephony" to Field Marshal P. Pibulsongkram, who was then Prime Minister. In the House of Representatives, however, most MPs vehemently disagreed on the grounds that it was a waste of the national budget, thereby temporarily suspending the project.

The British company Pye signed a contract to build a television station in Bangkok that would later be used as the backbone of Channel 4. The station was set up by T. V. Mitchell, a Singaporean businessman. Subsequently, Prasit Thavisin, chairman of the Board of Directors of Wichian Wireless and Telephony Co., Ltd., brought one radio transmitter and four receivers, with a total weight of over 2,000 kilograms, to conduct Thailand's first visual transmission of marching band performances from the Department of Public Relations at Government House. The broadcast was also opened to the general public at Sala Chalermkrung on 19 July 1952 and was seen by approximately 20,000 people. Training for the channel started in January 1955, when six staff went to the United States at the request of RCA.

The channel was originally launched as Channel 4 Bang Khun Phrom (ช่อง 4 บางขุนพรหม), with test transmissions beginning on 6 September 1954 and formal broadcasts on 24 June 1955. The then-new channel operated under the management of the Thai Television Company (founded 1952). The channel began to broadcast daily in 1957. HST-TV was managed by Pichai Vanasong. Its airtime was divided between 60% commercial shares and 40% public service programming. In the monochrome days, the channel used a circular plate featuring the Manimekhala as its logo.

Regional television stations started outside of Bangkok beginning in 1962. In February of that year, it opened a station in Khonkaen (HSKK-TV, channel 5), followed by Chiang Mai (HSKL-TV, channel 8), Hat Yai (HSBK-TV, channel 9, later channel 10 in the 625-line service) in May 1962, Surathani (HSS-TV, channel 7) in January 1968, and Muang (channel 9) in March 1972.

From 1 June 1970 to 1974, the channel migrated from broadcasting in black-and-white at 525-lines on VHF channel 4 to colour, using a 625-line system on VHF channel 9 (the second in Southeast Asia). The black-and-white transmitter fell out of use in 1974, broadcasting exclusively on channel 9 after this event. On 3 February 1977, the Thai Television Company was dissolved and channel 9 was put under direct state administration.

On 28 June 1981, Princess Sirindhorn and King Bhumibol Adulyadej officially inaugurated the new MCOT buildings on a 57m² large area with television transmission, the largest in the country at the time, at 9:25 a.m. On 16 July 1987, Channels 3 and 9 signed a broadcasting expansion agreement. In 1992, Sangchai Sunthornwat became the director of MCOT.

On 6 November 2002, the channel was rebranded as 'Modernine TV'. During the 2006 Thai coup d'état, the network was forced to stop broadcasting.

== Logos ==
1955 – 1974

1974 – 1977

1977 – 2002

2002 and 2013–2015 (English)

2003–2012 (Thai)

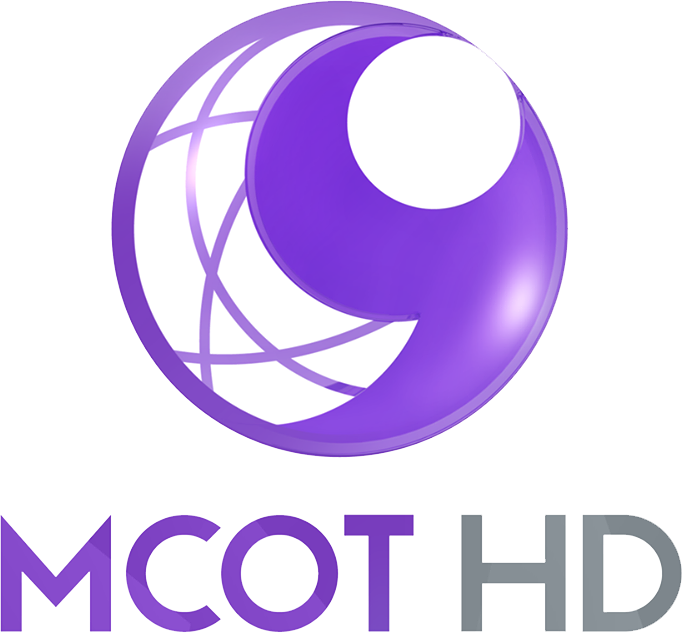
2015-2018

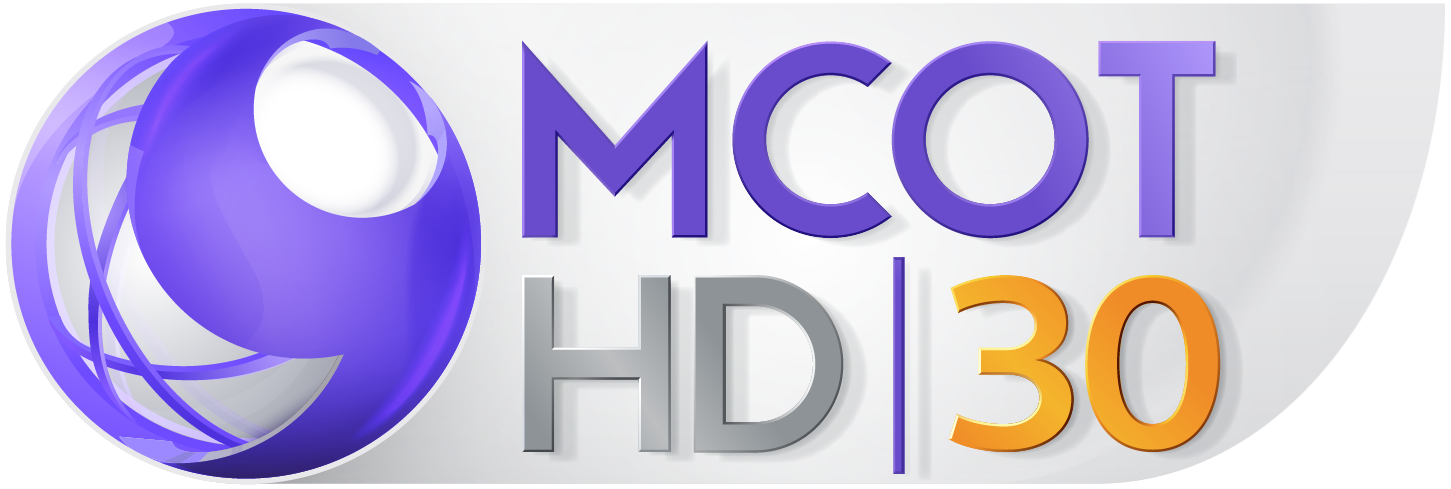
2018–present

== See also ==
- Media of Thailand
- Thai News Agency
- MCOT
