= MCOT =

Thai state-owned public broadcaster

MCOT Public Limited Company บริษัท อสมท จำกัด (มหาชน)
- Type: State-owned/public broadcast radio, television, news agency and online (Public, state-owned)
- Country: Thailand
- Motto: Digitally Beyond
- Headquarters: 63/1 Rama IX Road, Huai Khwang subdistrict, Huai Khwang district, Bangkok, Thailand
- Owner: Ministry of Finance
- Parent: Office of the Prime Minister
- Key people: Issara Sereewatthanawut, President
- Launch date: 10 November 1952; 73 years ago; 9 April 1977; 49 years ago (as MCOT)
- Former names: Mass Communication Organization of Thailand (1977–2003)
- Official website: Official website

MCOT Public Company Limited (MCOT; Thai: บริษัท อสมท จำกัด (มหาชน) RTGS: Borisat o so mo to chamkat (mahachon)), formerly known as the Mass Communication Organization of Thailand, is a Thai state-owned public broadcaster. It owns and operates a number of radio and television stations in Thailand. It is based in Bangkok.

At present, MCOT runs 6 national, one international, 52 provincial, one district radio station, two terrestrial free-to-air television channels (until 2019 where it is reduced to one), and 2 satellite television channels. (until 2017) Their motto is "Always Serving the Public". On their website MCOT uses the slogan "Digitally beyond" (Nov 2014).

== History ==
=== 1952–2000 ===
On 10 November 1952, MCOT was established as Thai Television Company Limited. Television services under the name Thai Thorathat (Channel 4) started on 24 June 1955 in time for national day celebrations.

In 1977 TTV Radio and Thailand Color Television Channel 9 moved to the present Huai Khwang headquarters in Bangkok and merged to form the Mass Communication Organization of Thailand (MCOT). In 1970, with the launch of Chong Sam (Channel 3), its newest station, the original Thai Thorathat (Channel Four) network was renamed Chong Kao (Channel 9).

Witthayu Tor Tor Tor ("TTV Radio") later became Radio MCOT on 25 March 1977 and became the nation's first 24-hour radio station.

Color television began in 1970 on Channel 3 and 1974 on Channel 9. Channel 9 was renamed Modernine TV in 2002.

=== 2001–present ===
In 2005, the Ministry of Finance announced their plan to digitize free-to-air television broadcasts nationwide. Trial broadcasts were undertaken, involving 1,000 households in the Bangkok Metropolitan Area.

MCOT has prepared at least three new channels exclusively for digital television, besides the two initial channels, Modernine TV and Channel 3. Though the trials had been long over, the digital channels are (said to be) still active in test form.

In addition, MCOT would introduce regional television channels for each province in Thailand. Each of these regions will have its own dedicated television channel with localised content compared to national television making it about 80 television channels for a digitised MCOT as part of the state broadcaster's three-year restructuring plan. MCOT was expected to launch its digital terrestrial television services nationally in 2012. MCOT launched digital terrestrial television in 2013, with full service in 2014.

In March 2011, MCOT announced that it is also possible that MCOT may be planning to switch to DVB-T2 in some occasion.

== List of services ==
=== Current services ===
==== Digital Television ====
Broadcasting on MCOT's 3rd MUX of 5 (UHF Channel 40 for Bangkok)

- 9MCOT – replaced (TTV) Channel 4 and formerly called Modernine TV. Broadcasting on LCN 30 (Simulcast with Analog Platform until 2018)

==== News agency ====
- Thai News Agency - Established on June 16, 1977. It serves as a central hub for the production, collection, storage, analysis, and dissemination of news information, presented through the company's media outlets: 9MCOT, the MCOT Radio network, and electronic media via its website. Furthermore, it has expanded its cooperation in various areas, including news exchange, with major news agencies and media outlets worldwide.

==== Radio ====
- LTM Lukthung Mahanakhon (Thai) - 95.00 MHz; first FM radio station in Thailand
- Thinking Radio (Thai) - 96.50 MHz
- Active Radio (Thai) - 99.00 MHz; the station for a healthy Thailand
- MCOT News (Thai) - 100.50 MHz
- Smooth (Thai and English) - 105.50 MHz
- MET 107 (English) - 107.00 MHz
- 41 provincial and regional stations

==== DTT Multiplex Network ====
- MCOT NOC (3rd MUX of 5) – UHF Channel 40 for Bangkok, and TV Network Station for Thailand's other provinces.

=== Former/Defunct services ===
==== Analog Television ====
All Analog television Stations was switched off in 2020

- Modernine TV – replaced (TTV) Channel 4; Analog version of 9MCOT
- Channel 3 – Former joint operation with Bangkok Entertainment Corporation (now BEC World). Their concession contract expired in 2020 and, as a result, no longer operates the channel but even before the switch-off, They didn’t control what to air.

Digital Television

- MCOT Family 14 – formerly called MCOT Kids and Family broadcasting on service channel 14 (currently defunct in 2019)

==== Satellite channels ====
- MCOT1 is a television channel that presents various programs and broadcasts live via satellite for the first time on April 9, 2007 (ending broadcast on January 1, 2017)
- MCOT2 was the first satellite television channel to broadcast various programs and live coverage on April 9, 2007. It launched on the same day as MCOT1. However, in 2009, the station changed its name to ASEAN TVand began broadcasting primarily in English, later becoming known as MCOT World.
- MCOT World is a news, entertainment and documentary channel (in English) broadcast via Thaicom satellite. It first aired on 12 August 2012 (ending on 15 October 2016).
- MCOT News 24, also known as the Constitution Station, began broadcasting on TrueVisions Channel 8 in 2007 to coincide with the drafting and referendum of the 2007 Constitution of the Kingdom of Thailand. It was a collaboration between TrueVisions (concessionaire) and MCOT Public Company Limited (the concession holder). The first broadcast aired in 2007 on News 24, a special news channel on TrueVisions, and ended that same year. It is now known as TNN2 on TrueVisions.

==== Radio ====
AM

- MCOT Radio (Thai) – 1143 kHz (defunct as of 1 March 2021)
- LikeStation (Thai) – 1494 kHz (previously Labourers' Radio Station, defunct as of 1 January 2021)

FM

- Mellow Pop (Thai) - 97.50 MHz (defunct in 2026)
- Seed 97.5 FM - 97.50 MHz (Off-Air since April 4, 2022 at 7:50AM. Continuing as online radio station.)

== Brand ==
=== Logo history ===
Number	Logo	Description
1		First Thai Thorathat logo used until 1977
2		M.C.O.T. organization logo used 1977–2004
3		MCOT PLC logo used 2004–present

- Thai Thorathat's first logo depicts images of "Witchu Prapha Dhewi" (Thai: วิชชุประภาเทวี), female angels and thunderbolts, adorned with clouds and lightning within a circle, designed by the Fine Arts Department of the Ministry of Education.
- In 1977, the same time of change to MCOT organization, the logo evolved into a circle. The center is white circle; the upper part is four sections divided by the curve of spread spectrum signals; the bottom curve is yellow, and next three sections are in primary colors of light (red, green, and blue); the lower part is yellow with the Thai letters "อ.ส.ม.ท." which is the abbreviation of the organization.
- Thai News Agency logo
  In 2003, the time of change to MCOT PLC, the logo became circular gray lines intersecting like latitude and longitude, a purple figure which hides number 9 in the right part, and a gray curve in the upper part. Under this logo are the English letters "MCOT" in orange with gray border (convergence with Modernine TV, MCOT Modern Radio, and Thai News Agency)

=== Commercial breaks ===
The logo is shown on commercial breaks and test transmissions.

=== Clocks ===
The clock in Thailand was not in colour until 1974. Originally the clock was based on the clock tower in Bangkok in black and white. In 1974 the clock was yellow on blue.

=== Test card ===
Until the introduction of 24-hour broadcasting in 2002, MCOT used the PM5544 test pattern during the off-air hours of TV9 and EBU Colorbars on Channel 3. Until 2002, MCOT used the Philips PM5534 (PM5544 with clock) during off-air hours.

=== On-air and off-air ===
Currently 9MCOT broadcast 24 hours a day.

==== 9MCOT ====
- 1955–1960
  - Channel 4 broadcast from 19:00–23:00 Thailand Standard Time.
- 1961–1967
  - Channel 4 broadcast from 18:00–23:30.
- 1968–1976
  - Channel 4 (and from 1974, Channel 9) broadcast from 15:30–24:00.
- 1977–1980
  - Channel 9 broadcast from 11:00–24:00.
- 1980–1991
  - Channel 9 broadcast from 16:00–24:00.
- 1991–1993
  - Channel 9 broadcasts for 19 hours daily, 06:00–01:00.
- 1994–2002
  - Channel 9 broadcasts for 20 half hours daily, 05:30–02:00.
- 1 February – 30 June 2017
  - Channel 9 broadcasts for 21 hours on weekday, 04:00–01:00. (for 20 half hours on Saturday and Sunday, 05:30–02:00)
- 2002–31 January 2017,1 July 2017–Some time in 2017
  - Channel 9 broadcasts on Monday to Friday, 05:00-00.30. (for 18 half hours on Saturday and Sunday, 05:30-01.30)

==== MCOT Family ====
- 1 April 2014 – 24 May 2014: MCOT Family was broadcast 20 hours daily, 04:00–24:00 (test of transmission).
- 25 May 2014 – IDK – 2019: MCOT Family broadcasts 19 hours daily, 05-00-24:00.
- IDK – 2019 : MCOT Family broadcasts 18 hours 50 minutes daily, 05:10–24:00

== See also ==
- List of television stations in Thailand
