= Have a nice day =

Expression

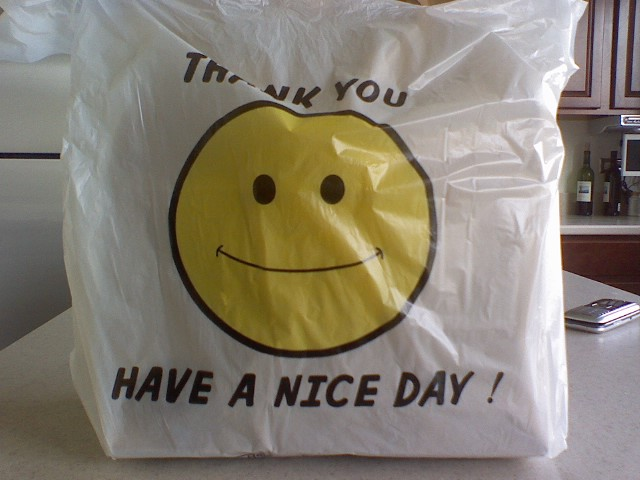
Plastic shopping bag in the United States, inviting the customer to "have a nice day"

Have a nice day is a commonly spoken expression used to conclude a conversation (whether brief or extensive), or end a message by hoping the person to whom it is addressed experiences a pleasant day. It is often uttered by service employees to customers at the end of a transaction, particularly in Israel and the United States. According to some journalists and scholars, its repetitious and dutiful usage has resulted in the phrase developing secondary cultural connotations of, variously, impersonality, lack of interest, passive-aggressive behavior, sarcasm or as a definitive way to put an end to a conversation and dismiss the other party.

The phrase is generally not used in Europe, as some find it artificial or even offensive. Critics of the phrase characterize it as an imperative, obliging the person to have a nice day. Other critics argue that it is a parting platitude that comes across as pretended. While defenders of the phrase agree that "Have a nice day" can be used insincerely, they consider the phrase to be comforting, in that it improves interactions among people. Others favor the phrase because it does not require a response.

A variant of the phrase—"have a good day"—is first recorded in Layamon's Brut (c. 1205) and King Horn. "Have a nice day" itself first appeared in the 1949 film A Letter to Three Wives. In the United States, the phrase was first used on a regular basis in the early to mid 1960s by FAA air traffic controllers and pilots in the form of "have a good day." It was subsequently popularized by truck drivers talking on CB radios. Variations on the phrase include "have a good one" and "have a nice one". In conjunction with the smiley face, the phrase became a defining cultural emblem of the 1970s and was a key theme in the 1991 film My Own Private Idaho. By 2000, "have a nice day" and "have a good day" were taken metaphorically, synonymous with the parting phrase "goodbye".

== History ==
The Oxford English Dictionary recorded the earliest uses of one of the phrase's variants—"have a good day"—as being "Habbeð alle godne dæie" in Layamon's Brut (c. 1205) and "Rymenhild, have wel godne day" in King Horn (1225). According to Roland Dickison of California State University, "have a good day" first appeared in Geoffrey Chaucer's 1387 The Canterbury Tales: "And hoom wente every man the righte way, there was namoore but 'Fare wel, have a good day'". Routinely employed by Chaucer in his literary works, "have a good day" disappeared for several centuries before its revival.

William Safire of The New York Times wrote that "have a nice day" first appeared in the 1948 film A Letter to Three Wives. The American Heritage Dictionary of Idioms stated that "have a nice day" first came into being in 1920, and the phrase and its variants became widely used after the 1950s. (Note: Prior to "have a nice day", the most popular valediction was "so long". Other farewell phrases were "see you later" and "see ya later", which evolved into "see ya later, alligator". In the 1960s, during growing abhorrence of the Vietnam War, people parted with the word "peace". Jack Smith of the Los Angeles Times lamented that there were no English counterparts to the graceful farewell phrases of other languages; Spanish had "hasta la vista", French had "au revoir", and German had "auf Wiedersehen".) According to Safire, Carol Reed of WCBS-TV spread the phrase in the New York metropolitan area in 1964 by closing her weather reports with "have a happy day", a variant of "have a nice day". The 1960s saw the phrase "have a good day" become prevalent and supersede "happy day". Numerous hippies, when parting, told each other to "have a nice day" or "have a beautiful day". In 1970, "have a nice city" was a mayoralty slogan in San Francisco. In 1972, during the Vietnam War, family members of POW/MIA members of the American armed forces participated in South Boston's Saint Patrick's Day march. They carried a black banner that read "POW/MIA Families Never Have a Nice Day". They received scowls and jeers from a hostile crowd. One woman said, "They should be shot for bringing this here."

By around 2000, "have a nice day" and "have a good day" were taken metaphorically, morphing into synonyms of the parting phrase "goodbye".

=== Smiley face and "have a nice day" ===
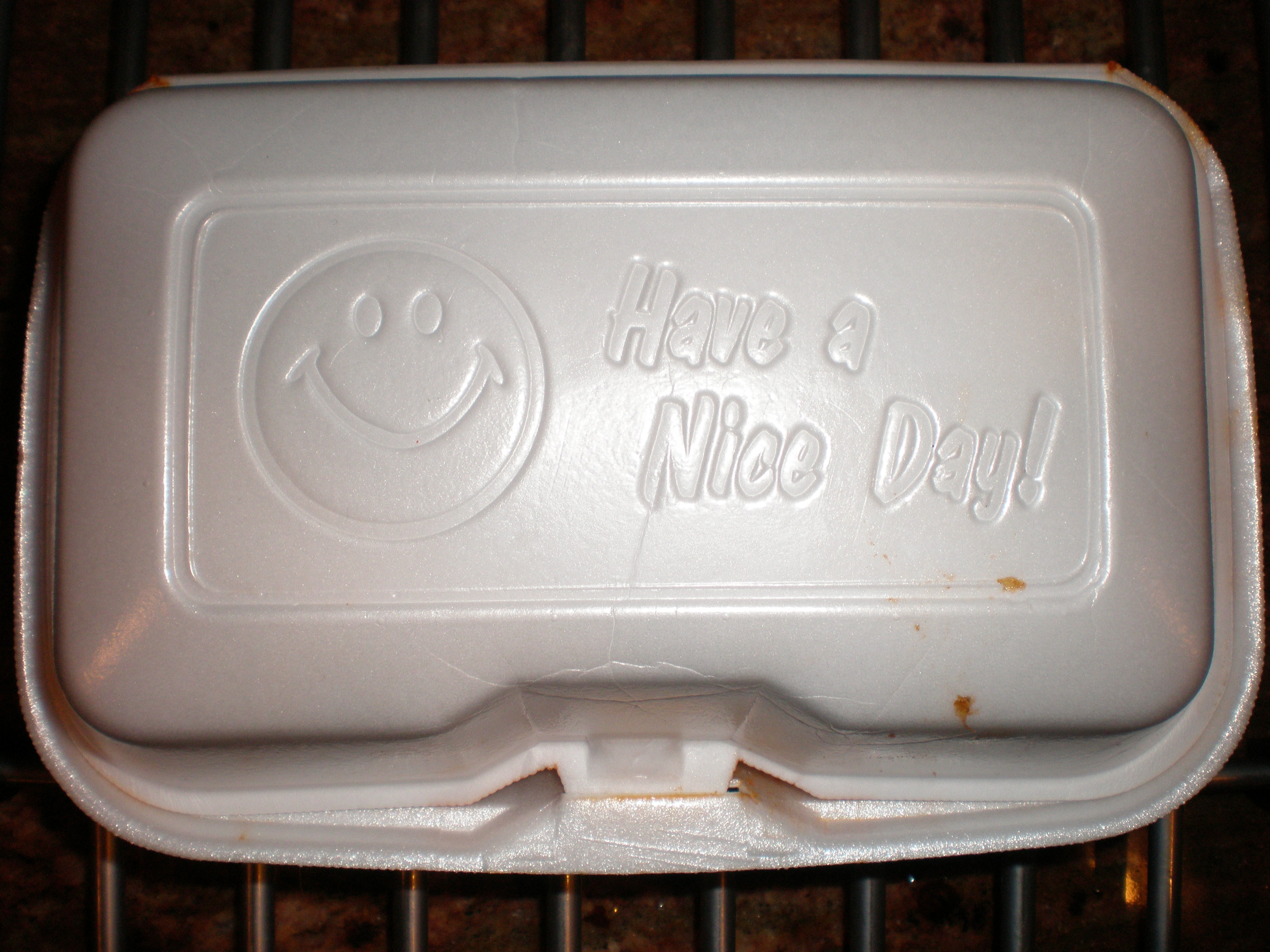
A polystyrene food container displaying a smiley face and the phrase "have a nice day"

Abigail Goldman of the Los Angeles Times, wrote that the smiley face and the expression "have a nice day" "helped to define the '70s". In the early 1970s, Philadelphian brothers Murray and Bernard Spain designed and sold products including bumper stickers and coffee mugs that each contained the yellow smiley face, usually attributed to Harvey Ball. They later changed the phrase to "Have a nice day".

The 1991 film My Own Private Idaho ironically ends with the parting phrase "have a nice day", which for the fourth time invokes the smiley face. Smiley faces represent optimism and appear to ask the characters, who are characterized as "marginal figures", how nice their days are. While traveling to Idaho, the protagonists' motorcycle breaks down, and one of the characters, Mike, gazes at the sun on the horizon and links it with the motto "have a nice day". He says, "I've been on this road before. Looks like a fucked-up face. Like it's saying 'have a nice day' or something."

In the 1994 film Forrest Gump, title character Forrest is jogging down the street when a T-shirt salesman approaches him, asking him to put his face on T-shirts as inspiration to people. While the men are jogging, a truck splashes mud into Forrest's face, and the salesman gives him a yellow shirt to wipe the mud off. Forrest rolls up the shirt and hands it back, saying "have a nice day". Unrolling the shirt, the man finds a smiley face outlined on it. Thus the film credits Forrest Gump with inventing the Smiley logo and the have a nice day slogan.

In September 2005, Bon Jovi released the album Have a Nice Day. The album cover contains a red smiley face which guitarist Richie Sambora stated echoes its title song. Sambora explained that "It's [like] 'Have a nice day; get out of my face'—therefore the smirk. To me, it's much more of a Clint Eastwood 'Have a nice day' than a smiley face 'Have a nice day.'"

== Usage ==
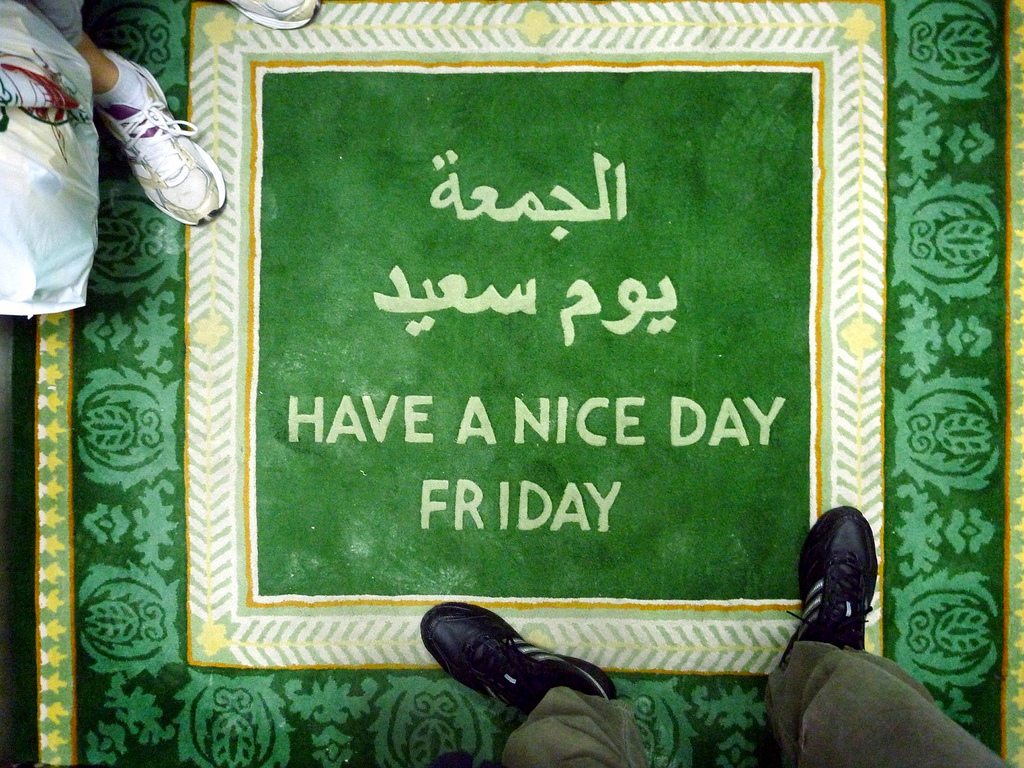
"Have a nice day Friday" on a carpet or floormat in English and Arabic

The phrase "have a nice day" is typically spoken by service employees or clerks to customers at the end of a transaction. A mercantile method of expressing "thank you" as in "thank you for shopping with us" or "thank you for using our service", it is commonly used among people in the United States and by retailers in New Zealand and elsewhere. In the 1970s, the American supermarket chain Kmart opened a store in Brisbane, Australia. The workers were trained to say, "Thank you for shopping at K-Mart. Have a nice day."

Other versions of "have a nice day" are "have a good one" and "have a nice one." The phrase was universalized after 1950 by truck drivers conversing on their CB radios. Scientific studies indicate that people who regularly smile are more likely to say "have a nice day". The phrase can have passive–aggressive connotations, and can be caustically used to end transactions with abusive customers. The speaker may also use the phrase ironically, in either a purposeful or unintentional manner.

Roly Sussex of The Courier-Mail wrote that "have a nice day" can sound "a touch brusque" in comparison with "you have a nice day". Deeming the word "you" as moderating the imperative, Sussex stated that the word "you" causes the phrase to seem like a mixture of a command and a hope. He wrote that using "you" in imperatives is more common with people under 25. In her 2001 book The Facts on File Dictionary of Clichés, Christina Ammer wrote about the growing usage of "have a good meal" in restaurants. Ammer opined that the phrase "induces teeth-gnashing irritation when voiced by a particularly incompetent waiter".

Academic Sandi Mann's interviews found that the British wished and demanded cordiality from service personnel, more than from their coworkers. Israelis, Americans, and Australians, on the other hand, wanted friendliness from both their coworkers and service personnel. Mann explains that the British do not expect a "smiley" display from colleagues because they have more time to build longer-term relationships. Those in the service industry, though, have to become "one-minute friends" each time they interact with customers.

=== In crime ===
On July 14, 1979, the Chicago Tribune published an article titled "This is a holdup; have a nice day" about a Minneapolis robber; while robbing the First Federal Savings & Loan Association of Chicago, the man gave a note to the bank teller that said "Thank you, and have a nice day". On November 3, 2007, two robbers equipped with handguns stole money from a kiosk at a Vale, North Carolina store; the Hickory Daily Record called them "courteous crooks" because after the theft, they told people to "have a nice day".

Before the Binghamton shooting on April 3, 2009, the perpetrator sent a rambling diatribe against the police to News 10 Now; the letter concluded with the chilling message "COP BRiNG ABOUT THiS SHOOTiNG COP MUST RESPONSiBLE. AND YOU HAVE A NiCE DAY".

=== In Israel ===
"Have a nice day" is frequently used in the Israeli retail and service industries. Jerry Levin wrote in his 2005 book West Bank Diary: Middle East Violence as Reported by a Former American Hostage about a woman in a coffee shop telling him to "have a nice day" after he purchased a sweet roll and coffee. Levin stated that there is also a "grimmer version of the pervasive pleasantry". After an Israeli soldier destroyed the memory card of Levin's camera, the soldier told him with a jocular smirk, "have a nice day".

In 2005, the Mosawa Center for Arab Rights in Israel paid for ads on television and radio stations in Israel. In the television ads, the Arabic phrase for "have a nice day" would flash onto the screen in black letters and on a red background. Immediately following the Arabic phrase would be a Hebrew phrase that said, "Are you already against it without even knowing what it says? All we wanted to say is have a nice day." Spokeswoman Abir Kopty stated that "[t]he purpose of this campaign was mainly to cause the Israeli public sitting at home, or walking down the street, to ask itself why it had a negative reaction to everything Arab, even if it is the simplest phrase." Kopty further said that the Mosawa Center wanted to encourage Arabs to be more active and more visible in the community.

=== In Korea ===
According to Korean Studies published by the University of Hawaii at Manoa, "have a nice day" is sometimes used in Korea. Korean Studies wrote that it "seemed somehow to fit nicely" with the phrase "Caymi posey yo", which was used in Korean shops to say goodbye. In recent years, it is more common to use the phrase "Annyeonghi gaseyo" to say goodbye in Korean shops.

=== In Europe ===
Beyond smiling, most Germans consider the phrase "have a nice day" an insincere and superficial bit of nonsense. To an American it's something normal and expected, but the more I hear this, the less I appreciate it. After all, if I'm at the supermarket to buy anti-nausea medicine for a sick child, I may have a nice day after all, but at that point the checker's "polite" have-a-nice-day comment seems even more inappropriate than usual. (Did she not notice I was buying nausea medicine, rather than, say, a six-pack of beer?) This is a true story, and a German friend who was with me that day happens to have a good sense of humor and was mildly amused by this strange American custom. We smiled about that, because there was a real reason to do so.

— Hyde Flippo

Europeans generally feel the phrase "have a nice day" is fake and that the speaker is solely interacting with the listener for business purposes. It is generally not used in the United Kingdom.

The phrase "have a nice day" spread to Britain from the United States. In Britain, the variants "have a fine day" and "have a good day" are frequently used in place of "have a nice day". British customers generally consider it to be obnoxious and overbearing, instead usually preferring the gentler expression "enjoy the rest of your afternoon".

In their 2002 book Different Games, Different Rules, Haru Yamada and Deborah Tannen recalled teaching a class in London, where a student construed "have a nice day" to be insincere. The student said that Americans "say things like that with this big fake smile on their face, and they don't really mean it". Not having the context of the metaphor, the student took the phrase literally and was unable to discern the intended cordiality. Conversely, when Americans visit stores in Britain where the salespeople engage not in "have a nice day" salesmanship, Americans regard British as lacking customer service.

Guy Browning penned an article in 2007 titled "How to... have a nice day" for The Guardian, writing that sarcasm will creep into the discussion if the British say "have a nice day". Browning explained that in Britain, people assume that the day will be horrible—even catastrophic. He wrote that for the United States though, "nice days and the having thereof are written into the constitution".

In Germany, "Schönen Tag noch!", the German phrase for "have a nice day", is being used more frequently by its vendors and waiters. German author Hyde Flippo wrote that many Germans deem "have a nice day" to be affected and shallow. Flippo further opined that the phrase is an appropriate example of culturally improper language. He compared it to smiling arbitrarily at a German person which would give the impression that the smiler is a "little simple-minded or not quite 'all there'". Writing that Germans prefer "Auf Wiedersehen!" or "Tschüss!" (both meaning "goodbye")—which German shopkeepers frequently use—to "dubious wishes for a nice day" he opined that that is why Germans generally favor visiting a small shop instead of a large department store.

The French also concur that the phrase is insincere. Author Natalie Schorr wrote that the French frequently say "bonne journée"—"good day" in French—and do not consider it to be insincere. Schorr explains that "bonne journée" is a "gracious formule de politesse", similar to merci and s'il vous plaît. However, "have a nice day" sounds like a trite phrase spoken by a telemarketer.

In Sweden, Lennart Fridén, a member of the Parliament of Sweden, lamented in a January 1995 speech to Parliament the usage of "ha en bra dag"—"have a nice day" in Swedish. Fridén stated that the increased usage of English loan expressions like "ha en bra dag" "impairs our sense of language and style". He proposed a motion that an authoritative body, working in conjunction with linguistic institutions, be delegated the job of "caring for the Swedish language"; the motion did not pass.

The Boston-born American author Edith Shillue wrote in her 2003 book Peace Comes Dropping Slow that when the Irish stereotyped Americans, they tended to use the phrase "have a nice day". While lodging at a house in Ireland, Shillue found a drawing on the wall for American visitors like her. Drawn by her host's daughters, the picture had the phrase "Have a ______ Day", with a smiley faced affixed instead of the word "nice". Irish author Aidan Higgins wrote in his 2004 book A Bestiary that the Americanization of Ireland led the Irish to say phrases like "No problem!" or "Have a nice day!" even when there is drenching rain.

=== In the United States ===
According to the Handbook of Hispanic Cultures in the United States, "[t]enga un nice day" is an example of Cuban Spanglish. This is distinguished from Chicano Spanish, in that the Chicano second-generation and beyond, who are inclined to code-switch, generally do not speak in the formal address form of "tenga".

In 1979, a New York judge sentenced a man to a seven- to ten-year jail term at the Auburn State Prison for committing a robbery. The judge's final words were "You are hereby remanded to the custody of the sheriff's department for delivery to the custody of state officials. Have a nice day." Jack Sheehan of WKRT stated that the convict "almost sank to his knees. The phrase had worked its magic."

== "Have a Nice Day" culture ==
Sandi Mann, a business psychologist at the University of Central Lancashire, defines the "Have a Nice Day" culture as filled with "fake smiles, forced bonhomie, and meaningless demands by workers to 'have a nice day'". Managers compel their employees to be attentive and affable with customers despite the fact that some employees do not feel these emotions.

Sandi Mann concludes from her research that the "Have a Nice Day" culture will prevail, becoming used by more companies and countries. In the service industry, for example, she explains that products have become more uniform over the past few decades. Thus, the sole way for companies to distinguish themselves is to have better customer service. She notes that there are positive and negative effects. A positive effect is that it is beneficial for business and for people who enjoy fake displays. A negative effect is that emotions incompatible with the "Have a Nice Day" culture are repressed, leading to what Mann terms the "Have a Nice Day" syndrome. In an interview for the Wall Street Journal, an employee of a telemarketing company, was called a son of a bitch. Clenching his teeth, he responded "Thank you very much, you have a nice day." The stress of suppressing their feelings and faking cheerfulness caused people like the telemarketer to feel insincere and phony. Individuals affected by the "Have a Nice Day" syndrome must carry out emotional labor, which could lead to diminished self-esteem, depression, and cynicism.

=== Criticism ===
Have a nice day! Sunnybank housewives, and indeed, people from other areas of Brisbane, collectively reeled from the blatant American cliché that had infiltrated our suburbs. Have a nice day! We only heard that on Hollywood movies and American soap operas! Now, poor innocent Aussie teenagers were being forced to say it as if they meant it!

There is no sincere way to say "have a nice day". It's an idiom that's been mashed and mangled over the decades until any semblance of meaning has been wrung out of it. It's as sincere as a game show host, but tragically has a much longer shelf life.

— Andrew Biggs of the Bangkok Post

Linguistically, "have a nice day" is a command in that the subject, the pronoun you, is intimated. It could be regarded as an exhortation to achieve an outcome that the recipient has no power to influence. However, it is also possible to interpret the phrase as a contraction of "I hope that you have a nice day".

Kerry LePage wrote in his 2004 book Some Day Never Comes that he chooses to have a nice day based on his own choice, not that of another person. J. Broad wrote in his 2007 book Some Day Never Comes that the phrase causes people to feel they have an obligation to have a nice day. Mike Royko wrote in his 2002 book For the Love of Mike that people may have a bad day, not a nice one, because they "confront a demanding boss, a nasty customer, a crabby teacher".

According to author John Tschohl, the tediousness of the phrase is exemplified by employees uttering the words so faintly as to be barely audible. The phrase is occasionally used in an ironic manner when others have been disrespectful or have negatively impacted the speaker. In Detroit, a supermarket started a program to have its cashiers tell every customer to "have a nice day" after completing their transactions. After conducting surveys, they realized that more than half of the customers were unaware of whether the clerk had said the phrase. In addition, a number of customers commented that they despised being told to "have a nice day". In a 2006 study, researchers at Frankfurt University discovered that people who must smile and say "have a nice day" in their jobs are more prone to illness. Flight attendants, waiters, and call center operators, as well as others who are forced to act cheerfully, are more likely to become depressed. This can lead to decreased immune system function.

Australian Andrew Biggs of the Bangkok Post wrote that in the past, the phrase was heard exclusively in Hollywood movies and American soap operas. He lamented that by the 1970s, Aussie teenagers were compelled to tell customers to "have a nice day", a "blatant American cliché". Biggs stated that "have a nice day" is "an idiom that's been mashed and mangled over the decades".

Jan C. Snow laments that the phrase was trite and indicative of the speaker's lack of vocabulary. She wrote that on Saturdays, people could be asked to "have a relaxing day". People with highly variable jobs such as emergency room nurses may appreciate "have a routine day", while mothers of young children may wish to "have a quiet day". Debbie Lundberg wrote in her 2008 book Have a Nice Day Is Not Thank You, and No Problem Is Not You're Welcome that service people should say "thank you" instead of "have a nice day". She argued that "thank you" is shorter and is a "recognition of the ability you have to thank someone", which adds more worth to the purchase than something that will occur in the future. Paul V. Marshall, the bishop of the Episcopal Diocese of Bethlehem, concurred, writing in the Reading Eagle that he prefers "thank you" to "have a nice day" or "have a great day" even though "thank you" has a "host of socially acceptable responses". He stated that when people say "thank you", they admit that they are dependent on others, which leads to a healthier, safer society.

J. Broad wrote that the phrase "have a nice day" is an apt middle ground for the "drop dead" the cashier is thinking and the "come back soon" the owner wants. Broad stated that the phrase is meaningless because it has been castrated by excessive usage and pretense. He compared the phrase to the salutation "How are you?" and the phrase "had a lovely time", which are "conversational space-fillers" that help prevent embarrassing silences. Usage of the term has been compared to inserting the phrase "you know" or the word "like" in sentences. In 1982, comedian George Carlin joked at Carnegie Hall, "That's the trouble with 'Have a nice day'; it puts all the pressure on you. Now you've got to go out and somehow manage to have a good time, all because of some loose-lipped cashier. 'Have a nice day ...' Maybe I don't feel like having a nice day. Maybe, just maybe, I've had 116 nice days in a row and I'm ready, by God, for a crappy day."

William Safire of The New York Times wrote that when the speaker of the phrase is genuine and maintains eye contact, the act is a "social asset and a note of civility" in a busy world. However, he stated that when the phrase is robotically said or said in a tone similar to "get lost", the utterance "comes across with a resounding clank of falsity". Marilyn Gardner of The Christian Science Monitor wrote that the "bland age of 'Have-a-nice-day' should come to a deserving end". She opined that service could not be "peddled as an image", and that substance is more important than style. Satirical commentator Russell Baker wrote in the Chicago Tribune that he did not know Ma Bell was waning until she began using the phrase "have a nice day".

Miss Manners wrote in her 1990 book Miss Manners' Guide for the Turn-of-the-Millennium that although the phrase was trite, she wondered whether there was "so much deeply felt good will" permeating through the world that shallow friendliness ought to desist. She stated that for her, saying "goodbye" is sufficient because it expresses the same well-wishing farewell sentiment. Leil Lowndes wrote in her 2009 book How to Instantly Connect with Anyone that if someone says "have a nice day", the recipient should refrain from sarcastically responding "Thanks, but I have other plans" or "Gee, I was planning on having a miserable one, but now that you mention it, I think I'll have a nice one." Lowndes suggested that the response merely be "You, too."

=== Defense ===
Long ago I would have mocked "Have a nice day" as an international gold standard of American insincerity. But alone, ill-slept and, most of all, charmed by its contrast with my own country's default mode of public aggression, I found it soothing, even kind. So what if it isn't truly meant or is parroted 1,000 times a day? It oils the squeaky old cogs of social interaction, makes it more pleasant for millions of hard-packed people to coexist in an often brutal, unnaturally vertical city. Manners keep public space clean and neutral; provide a little much-needed mental distance between us.

— Janice Turner of The Times

Carol Swiderski of the Chicago Tribune wrote that although saying "have a nice day" may not be sincere, the speaker has acknowledged that the recipient is there. She argued "[h]ave we become so analytic that we can't accept these little niceties without asking ourselves, 'Did he really mean it? Does she really care if I have a nice day?'" Writing that society has become so automated that going through a check-out line at a grocery store without having made eye contact or spoken with the checker is possible, Swiderski favored "insincerely meant human kindness to a robot". She encouraged people to respond to "have a nice day" with "you have a nice day, too" because she hoped that when a sufficient number of people do this, there could be a time when people will sincerely intend it.

Jeff Corbett of The Newcastle Herald defended "have a nice day" despite his characterization of the phrase as "wincingly American and so patently false in its sing-song delivery" by cashiers. Corbett favored the phrase to the inquiries of the shopkeepers about his life; he preferred "have a nice day" because it did not entail a response.

Janice Turner of The Times supported the phrase, writing that she is indifferent to it being used insincerely or 1,000 times a day. She wrote that "have a nice day" is "soothing, even kind", in that it improves the interactions among millions of people crowded together.

William F. Wyatt Jr. of the Chicago Tribune wrote that "have a nice day" used to be new and "fill[ed] a needed slot". "Goodbye", he stated, inappropriately indicates that salespeople are intimate with customers they do not know and would seem forced. "Farewell", Wyatt said, would feel abnormal and could only be employed in an ironic context. The close of a transaction needed an oral ending. "Have a nice day" was the apt phrase for those who serve people they do not know to end a transaction.

== Notes and references ==
Notes

Footnotes

Bibliography

- Ammer, Christine (1997). The American Heritage Dictionary of Idioms. Boston: Houghton Mifflin Harcourt. p. 288. ISBN 0-395-72774-X.
- Ammer, Christine (2001). The Facts on File Dictionary of Clichés. New York: Checkmark Books. ISBN 0-8160-4356-6.
- Brown, Mark Graham (1996). Keeping Score: Using the Right Metrics to Drive World-class Performance. New York: American Management Association. ISBN 0-8144-0327-1.
- Broad, J. (2004). Observations from a Broad: Annotated Edition. Lincoln, NE: iUniverse. ISBN 0-595-33657-4.
- Harling, Michael; Jenkins, Debbie (2008). Postcards from Across the Pond: Dispatches from an Accidental Expat. London: Cabal Group. ISBN 978-1-905430-48-2.
- Hedrick, Donald Keith; Reynolds, Bryan (2000). Shakespeare Without Class: Misappropriations of Cultural Capital. New York: Palgrave Macmillan. ISBN 0-312-22271-8.
- Higgins, Aidan (2004). A Bestiary. Normal, Illinois: Dalkey Archive Press. ISBN 1-56478-357-X.
- Kime, Steve (2003). Highway to Your Dreams!. Longwood, Florida: Xulon Press. ISBN 1-59160-553-9.
- Kanellos, Nicolás; Esteva-Fabregat, Claudio, eds. (1994). Handbook of Hispanic Cultures in the United States. Houston: Arte Público Press. ISBN 1-55885-102-X.
- King, Alan (2005). Matzo Balls for Breakfast: And Other Memories of Growing Up Jewish. New York: Simon & Schuster. ISBN 0-7432-6074-0.
- Kirkpatrick, Betty; Kirkpatrick, Elizabeth McLaren (1999). Clichés: Over 1500 Phrases Explored and Explained. New York: St. Martin's Press. ISBN 0-312-19844-2.
- Korean Studies. Vol. 7. Manoa: University of Hawaii at Manoa. 1983.
- Ladd, Barry (1996). Reflections of a Country Doctor. Lakewood, CO: Glenbridge Publishing. ISBN 0-944435-37-8.
- LePage, Kerry (2007). Some Day Never Comes. Apex, NC: Klaatu Enterprises. ISBN 978-1-4243-2855-0.
- Levin, Jerry (2005). Observations from a Broad: Annotated Edition. Pasadena, CA: Hope Publishing House. ISBN 1-932717-03-X.
- Lowndes, Leil (2009). How to Instantly Connect with Anyone: 96 All-New Little Tricks for Big Success in Relationships. New York: McGraw-Hill. ISBN 978-0-07-154585-3.
- Lundberg, Debbie (2008). Have a Nice Day Is Not Thank You, and No Problem Is Not You're Welcome. Tampa: Lulu. ISBN 978-0-615-16917-0.
- Mann, Sandi (1999). Hiding What We Feel, Faking What We Don't: Understanding the Role of Your Emotions at Work. Shaftesbury: Element Books. ISBN 1-86204-464-3.
- Mansour, David (2005). From Abba to Zoom: A Pop Culture Encyclopedia of the Late 20th Century. Kansas City: Andrews McMeel Publishing. ISBN 0-7407-5118-2.
- Martin, Judith (1990). Miss Manners' Guide for the Turn-of-the-Millennium. New York: Simon & Schuster. ISBN 0-671-72228-X.
- McCleary, John Bassett (2004). The Hippie Dictionary: A Cultural Encyclopedia of the 1960s and 1970s. Berkeley: Ten Speed Press. ISBN 1-58008-547-4.
- Olofsson, Gwyneth (2004). When in Rome or Rio or Riyadh--: Cultural Q&As for Successful Business Behavior Around the World. Yarmouth, M: Intercultural Press. ISBN 1-931930-06-6.
- Robinson, Melissa B.; Dunn, Maureen (2006). The Search for Canasta 404: Love, Loss, and the POW/MIA Movement. Boston: University Press of New England. ISBN 1-58465-486-4.
- Royko, Mike (2002). For the Love of Mike: More of the Best of Mike Royko. Chicago: University of Chicago Press. ISBN 0-226-73074-3.
- Schorr, Natalie (2009). Tune Up Your French with MP3 Disc. Chicago: McGraw-Hill. ISBN 978-0-07-162795-5.
- Shillue, Edith (2003). Peace Comes Dropping Slow: Conversations in Northern Ireland. Amherst: University of Massachusetts Press. ISBN 1-55849-368-9.
- Snow, Jan C. (1999). You May Already Be a Winner: and Other Marginal Considerations. Kent, OH: Kent State University Press. ISBN 0-87338-467-9.
- Tschohl, John (1996). Achieving Excellence Through Customer Service. Minneapolis: Best Sellers Publishing. ISBN 0-9636268-4-1.
- Vincent, Jane; Fortunati, Leopoldina (2009). Electronic Emotion: The Mediation of Emotion Via Information and Communications Technologies. Oxford: Peter Lang. ISBN 978-3-03911-866-3.
- Welt, Sheila Rouslin; Herron, William G. (1990). Narcissism and the Psychotherapist. New York: Guilford Press. ISBN 0-89862-398-7.
- West, Russell (2000). ""This is a Man's Country": Masculinity and Australian National Identity in Crocodile Dundee". In West, Russell; Lay, Frank (eds.). Subverting Masculinity: Hegemonic and Alternative Versions of Masculinity in Contemporary Culture. Amsterdam: Rodopi. p. 46. ISBN 90-420-1234-X.
- Yamada, Haru; Tannen, Deborah (2002). Different Games, Different Rules: Why Americans and Japanese Misunderstand Each Other. Oxford: Oxford University Press. ISBN 0-19-515485-1.
