= Suthichai Yoon =

Thai journalist, television personality, and author

- สุทธิชัย หยุ่น
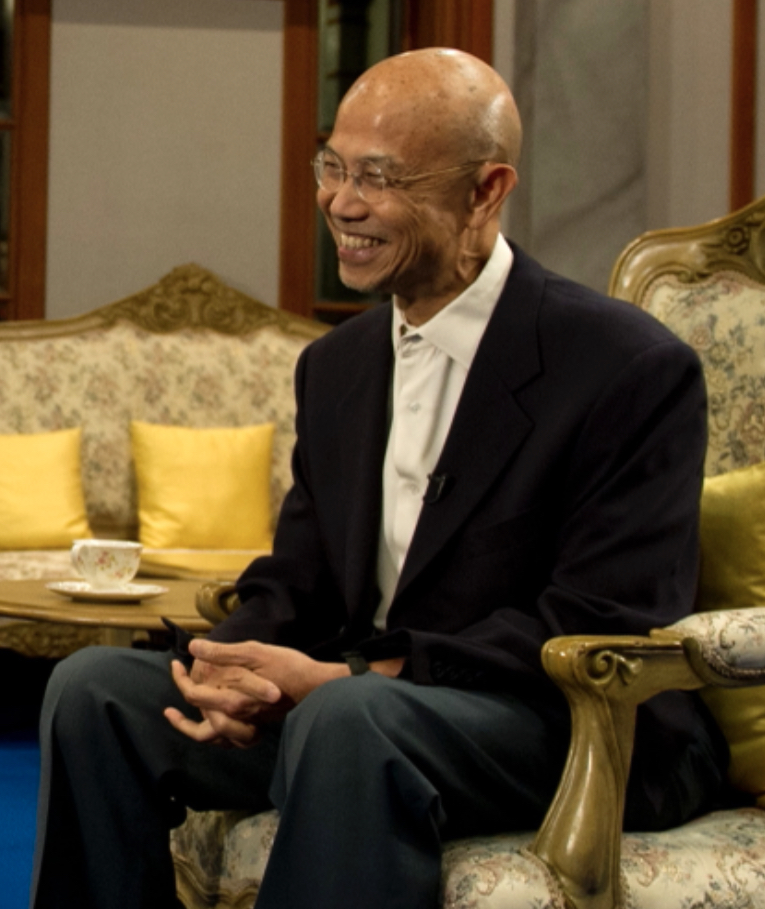
- Sutthichai in 2012
- Born: Suthichai Sae-yoon; November 24, 1946 (age 79); Hat Yai, Songkla, Thailand
- Education: Chulalongkorn University
- Occupations: Journalist; author; anchor
- Years active: 1968–present
- Relatives: Prabda Yoon (son); Thepchai Yong (brother)
- Awards: Nieman Fellowship (1979); Sriburapha Award (2008)

Suthichai Yoon (born November 24, 1946) is a Thai journalist, television personality, and author. He is the primary anchor of the Thai PBS news show and former CEO of Nation Multimedia Group, founder and editorial director of The Nation and many other news channels in Thailand such as iTV and Nation TV.

== Early life and family ==
Suthichai was born in a poor Chinese-Thai family in Hat Yai, Songkhla Province, the mother's name Suichan Sae-fung. He is the brother of Thepchai Yong. He completed the primary school from Saengthong Vitthaya School. Then went to Assumption Commercial College for Secondary school. While attending school, he also worked at the Bangkok Post newspaper and Siamrath Daily. He then furthered his education at the Faculty of Communication Arts, Chulalongkorn University While studying here, he also worked as a proofreading staff at Bangkok Post in 1968. It was not easy to balance work with study. Ultimately, he decided to drop out of college to fully focus on working instead. Then, he was promoted to be an Assistant head of news at Bangkok Post. Five months later, he was promoted to be the homeland news editor despite his the young age and without a college degree. Suthichai Yoon won the Sriburapha Award because he dared to make the news of Narong Kittikachorn broke the police fort because of drunkenness.

== Career ==
Until 1971, Bangkok Post acquired the Bangkok World newspaper which he saw that it is a monopoly in the English newspaper industry. Therefore, together with ML Sunida Kitiyakara, Thammanoon Mahapaorayae and fellow journalists by selling shares to the public to raise funds until it was about 2 million baht in the establishment of the first English daily newspaper for the Thai people owning the name of The Voice of the Nation on 1 July 1971. In the year 1974, he worked with National Broadcasting Services of Thailand and became famous from the news of the Persian Gulf War on the Channel 3. Later, when the 1976 coup happened on 6 October 1976, followed by the order to close all newspapers in Thailand Suthichai therefore brought the license that he had previously reserved issued a new newspaper called The Nation Review on 8 November 1976, then in the year 1985, changed to the name used until now as The Nation.

After the coup in Thailand in 2014, he was appointed as a member of the National Reform Committee on Mass Communication and Information technology in Prayut Chan-ocha government.

In 2018 Prime Minister Prayut Chan-ocha choose Suthichai served as a host for the press conference for Tham Luang cave rescue.

He appeared as the leader of a Buddhist monastery in the third season of The White Lotus in 2025.

== Personal life ==
Suttichai is married to Nantawan Yoon, the former editor of Lalana Magazine. They have a son, Prabda Yoon, the SEA Prize Writer of the Year 2002, and a daughter, Shimbun Yoon.

== Career timeline ==
=== Master of Ceremony: MC ===
Year	Thai title	Title	Network	Notes	With
2018–2021	กาแฟดำ ค่ำนี้	Black coffee tonight	9 MCOT HD (30)		
2018–2021	เจาะอนาคตตอบโจทย์	Future Insights	MCOT Radio FM 100.5 MHz		
2021–present	คุยให้คิด	Talk and think	Thai PBS (3)		
2021–present	เข้มข่าวค่ำ (เสาร์-อาทิตย์; ช่วงวิเคราะห์ข่าว)	Evening News Focus	PPTVHD36		
2021–present	กาแฟดำ EP.1 (FULL)	Black coffee	PPTVHD36		
2021–present	สุทธิชัย ไลฟ์	Suthichai Live	YouTube:suthichai live Facebook: Suthichai Live		

== Filmography ==
- The White Lotus season 3 (2025)
