= Rueang Lao Chao Nee =

- Genre: News and current affairs
- Presented by: Sorrayuth Suthassanachinda; Pichayatanee Chanput
- Country of origin: Thailand
- Original language: Thai

Production
- Producers: Sorrayuth Suthassanachinda; Angkana Wattanamongkolsilp
- Production locations: Studio 10th Floor, Maleenont Tower
- Camera setup: Multi-camera
- Running time: 145 minutes
- Production companies: Krob Krua Kao 3 Shad Thoy Shad Kam Co., Ltd. Raisom Co., Ltd. Tero Entertainment; Bangkok Kanlakon

Original release
- Network: Channel 3 HD (TV); Krob Krua Kao Radio (Radio); Eazy FM 105.5 (Currently Eazy FM 102.5)
- Release: June 2, 2003 – present

Related
- Rueng Lao Sao-Artit; Rueng Lao Na Neung; Kammakorn Kao Kui Nok Jor

Rueang Lao Chao Nee (Thai: เรื่องเล่าเช้านี้; RTGS: Rueanglaochaoni; lit. 'Morning News Story') is a Thai morning show in a news-talk format, featuring Sorrayuth Suthassanachinda as the main news anchor. Currently, he co-hosts with Pichayatanee Chanput. It is produced by the news department of Channel 3 HD under the name Krob Krua Kao 3, in collaboration with Sorrayuth's Shad Thoy Shad Kam Co., Ltd. It first aired on June 2, 2003.

Currently, the "Rueng Lao" group of programs is divided into four shows: Rueng Lao Chao Nee, airing every Monday–Friday from 6:00 AM–8:25 AM; Rueng Lao Sao-Artit, airing every Saturday–Sunday from 10:15 AM–12:15 PM; Rueng Lao Na Neung, airing every Monday–Friday from 5:30 AM–6:00 AM. These three programs air on Channel 3 HD as well as Rueng Lao Chao Nee's social media channels. Finally, Kammakorn Kao Kui Nok Jor airs every Monday–Friday after Rueng Lao Chao Nee ends, distributed via Sorrayuth's social media channels.

== History ==
The origins of this program began when Supon Wichianchai, a drama director from Bangkok Lakorn under BEC-Tero Entertainment Public Company Limited (at the time), brought Sorrayuth Suthassanachinda, then a news anchor from Nation Channel, to host a new game show called "Magic Box." It aired on Channel 3 in early 2003. This led Prawit Maleenont, then an executive at Channel 3, to develop the idea for a morning show produced in Sorrayuth's style.

Initially, Channel 3 wanted Sorrayuth to host a 30-minute morning show every Monday–Friday before heading to host "Kep Tok Jak Nation" on Nation Channel. However, Nation Broadcasting Corporation Public Company Limited, the owner of Nation Channel, refused to allow him to do the show. Consequently, in May 2003, Sorrayuth resigned from Nation Channel to take on the role for the new program full-time. Regarding the program's name, Sorrayuth mentioned it was almost called "Khui Khui Khao" (which later became the name of a show he did with Kanok Ratwongsakul on Modernine TV) and several other names containing the word "morning," until they settled on "Rueng Lao Chao Nee" (Morning News Story). It first aired on June 2, 2003.

Later, on December 10, 2020, the BEC World group sold all its shares in BEC-Tero Entertainment Public Company Limited to Brian Lindsay Marcar, the managing director of BEC-Tero, making him the sole shareholder. BEC-Tero then changed its name to Tero Entertainment Public Company Limited. However, Tero sold the copyrights and transferred the production, management, and staff of the three "Rueng Lao" news programs—Rueng Lao Chao Nee, Rueng Lao Na Neung, and Rueng Lao Sao-Atit—back to Channel 3 and the BEC World group. This was because these news programs were distinctly Channel 3's format. As a result, all three programs are currently produced primarily by Channel 3's news department.

In 2022, Raisom Company Limited ceased operations. Consequently, Chad Thoy Chad Kham Company Limited, another company founded by Sorrayuth, took over as the co-producer for the segments of Rueng Lao Chao Nee that Sorrayuth produces.

== Editions ==
Currently, there are 4 programs in the "Ruang Lao" (Storytelling) group as follows:

=== Ruang Lao Chao Nee (Morning News Story) ===
Ruang Lao Chao Nee is a morning news program that uses a conversational, storytelling style to engage with viewers. It currently airs every Monday–Friday from 6:00 AM to 8:25 AM on Channel 3 HD, and is also broadcast via the Facebook, YouTube, and TikTok channels of Ruang Lao Chao Nee. It first aired on June 2, 2003.

The format features a co-hosting dynamic between Sorrayuth Suthassanachinda and a female news anchor, which has changed over time, including Poonyavee Sukkulworaseth, Meesook Jaengmeesook, Suquan Bulakul, Krittika Korpaiboon, and currently, Pichayatanee Chanput. Regarding the news presentation, it was the first news program in Thailand to move away from traditional news reading in favor of "news storytelling"—presenting news in a way that allows viewers to visualize the story without needing to see actual footage. There is no script and no fixed run-down. Consequently, each day's presentation is unique. A key highlight is Sorrayuth's distinctive presentation style, which has become iconic, as well as various social assistance projects organized by the program. Initially, the program was divided into segments such as Ruang Lao Chao Nee Dek (Kids), International News (now moved to Ruang Lao Na Neung), Share of the Day, Sports News, and Krob Krua Ban Terng (Entertainment Family), the latter of which later branched off into an online program called "Krob Krua Ban Terng Online."

After Sorrayuth announced his resignation from all programs on Channel 3 in early 2016, the Channel 3 news department adjusted the format of Ruang Lao Chao Nee, making Pichayatanee the main anchor, paired with Krittika Korpaiboon, Jek Rattantangtrakul, Piphu Phumkaewkla, and Pasit Apinyawat respectively. The program returned to its original format after Sorrayuth returned to host again on May 1, 2021, and continues to the present.

=== Ruang Lao Na Neung (Front Page Story) ===
Ruang Lao Na Neung is a morning news program spun off from Ruang Lao Chao Nee. It first aired in 2018 (with Sorrayuth Suthassanachinda as a co-producer while working behind the scenes). It focuses on summarizing "Top News, Key Issues for Early Risers" primarily from newspaper headlines. Currently, it is divided into 3 segments:

- Headline News: Summary of top news from newspaper headlines.
- Ruang Lao Rob Lok (World Stories): Summary of international news.
- Ruang Lao Karn Muang (Political Stories): Summary of political news.

It first aired on July 30, 2018, and broadcasts every Monday–Friday from 5:30 AM to 6:00 AM on Channel 3 HD, as well as through Ruang Lao Chao Nee's social media channels. Initially, it was hosted by Ruang Lao Chao Nee anchors such as Orachun Rintarawitoon, Pichayatanee Chanput, Pasit Apinyawat, and Maychaka Supichayangkur. Currently, it is hosted by Maychaka Supichayangkur (Mon–Thu), Atiruj Kittipatana (Mon–Wed, Fri), and Praweenmai Baikloy (Thu, Fri).

=== Kammakorn Khao Khui Nok Jor (News Laborer Off-Screen Chat) ===
Kammakorn Khao Khui Nok Jor is a morning news storytelling program spun off from Ruang Lao Chao Nee, broadcast exclusively on social media. This allows Sorrayuth to express his opinions on various news topics freely without the constraints of television broadcasting regulations. As a result, Sorrayuth's news presentation in this segment is frequently discussed on social media. It airs every Monday–Friday after Ruang Lao Chao Nee ends, on Sorrayuth's social media channels under the name Sorrayuth Suthassanachinda Kammakorn Khao. It first aired on April 24, 2023. Originally, it had trial broadcasts under the name Kammakorn Khao Perd Ok Khui (News Laborer Heart-to-Heart), which was a special program featuring interviews between Sorrayuth and political guests during the 2023 Thai general election on April 7, 11, 12, 18, and 20, 2023. A trial broadcast in a format similar to the current Kammakorn Khao Khui Nok Jor occurred on April 19, airing on the Sorrayuth Suthassanachinda Kammakorn Khao YouTube channel and the Ruang Lao Chao Nee Facebook page (before later switching to Sorrayuth Suthassanachinda Kammakorn Khao on July 25, 2023).

== Reception ==
The program *Rueng Lao Chao Nee* was highly successful during its first two years of broadcasting. This was due to Sorrayuth Suthassanachinda's ability to weave substance into every news story, his engaging humor, and a non-hierarchical news presentation style that prioritized stories of public interest. This propelled *Rueng Lao Chao Nee* to the number one spot in ratings among all morning programs. Consequently, advertising rates were increased three times during the first two years: from an initial 50,000 baht to 80,000 baht, then 100,000 baht, and finally 135,000 baht respectively. As a result, *Rueng Lao Chao Nee* generated between 200 and 300 million baht in annual revenue for Channel 3, becoming the highest-earning news program of that era. This success prompted other television stations to broadcast more news content, specifically by revamping their morning news formats to compete directly with *Rueng Lao Chao Nee*.

However, after the National Anti-Corruption Commission (NACC) found Sorrayuth guilty on September 20, 2012, for his role and that of Rai Som Co., Ltd. in supporting an official of MCOT Plc. to embezzle excess advertising revenue, the Anti-Corruption Organization of Thailand and 40 private sector member organizations sent an official letter to Channel 3. They urged the station to reconsider Sorrayuth's role, threatening to withdraw all advertising from his programs. Four major private companies subsequently canceled their advertising slots in Sorrayuth's programs starting in January 2013. Despite this, Channel 3 allowed Sorrayuth to continue hosting as usual. Following the Court of First Instance's verdict on February 29, 2016, sentencing Sorrayuth to 13 years and 4 months in prison, Channel 3 still kept him on air. The Media Agency Association of Thailand later revealed that several major brands and banking groups had requested to withdraw further advertising from his programs. Finally, Sorrayuth announced he would cease hosting all programs on Channel 3, including *Rueng Lao Chao Nee*, effective March 3, 2016. It was later revealed that this was due to an order from MCOT Plc., the plaintiff in Sorrayuth's case, acting in its capacity as a contracting partner with Bangkok Entertainment Co., Ltd., which operated Channel 3's analog station at the time.

Sorrayuth's departure had a direct impact on *Rueng Lao Chao Nee*, causing both ratings and advertising revenue to decline. Consequently, Channel 3 decided to address the issue by reducing the program's airtime and spinning off a segment into "Rueng Lao Na Neung" in 2018.

After Sorrayuth was granted parole in March 2021, Surin Krittayaphongphun, then President of TV Business at BEC World Plc. (which directly oversees Channel 3), revealed that the station had revamped its schedule. Specifically, they added 30 minutes to *Rueng Lao Chao Nee* to accommodate Sorrayuth's return, as he was considered a vital asset to the news department. This reshuffle positively impacted the overall ratings of all Channel 3 news programs and led to higher advertising sales. Some news programs sold out their entire advertising inventory, directly benefiting Channel 3's overall performance. This led the station to expand news airtime again in April 2022 for weekend programs; Sorrayuth's *Rueng Lao Sao-Atit* also received an additional 10 to 15 minutes of airtime.
