= Thepchai Yong =

Thai newspaper and television journalist (born 1955)

- Born: 22 April 1955 (age 70); Hat Yai, Songkhla, Thailand
- Occupation: journalist
- Organization(s): Thai Broadcast Journalists Association; Thai Public Broadcasting Service
- Relatives: Suthichai Yoon (brother)
- Awards: International Press Freedom Award laureates (1992); Nieman Fellowship (2005)

Thepchai Yong (Thai: เทพชัย หย่อง; born 22 April 1955) is a Thai newspaper and television journalist known for his reporting on corruption and his criticism of the governments of Suchinda Kraprayoon and Thaksin Shinawatra.

== Biography ==
Thepchai Yong began his journalism career in the early-1980s as a proofreader for the Thai English-language daily The Nation. He eventually worked his way up the position of editor, a position he still held during the 1992 "Black May" democratic uprising against the military government of General Suchinda Kraprayoon. Despite military pressure, Thepchai Yong refused the Suchinda government's demands for The Nation to downplay its coverage of the protests and resulting military reprisals. His actions won him the International Press Freedom Award of the Committee to Protect Journalists later that year.

From 1996 to 2000, Thepchai Yong served as news director of iTV, the nation's first independent television network. During this time, he became known for his investigations into political scandals and corruption. He also acted as anchor for the station's primary news broadcast. Following election of Thaksin Shinawatra, however, he found himself sacked for his unflattering coverage of the prime minister's telecommunications conglomerate, the Shin Corporation.

After leaving iTV, Thepchai Yong helped found the Thai Broadcast Journalists Association in 2001, serving as its president from 2002-2004. During this time, The Nation, with which Thepchai Yong was still active, reportedly found itself under increasing pressure from the government of Thaksin Shinawatra. In 2003, the group's Thai-language paper Kom Chad Luek came under pressure not to run a story that Panthongtae Shinawatra, the prime minister's son, had been caught cheating on a college exam; Thepchai Yong ran the story on the paper's front page, and was subsequently forced to resign from the Nation Multimedia Group.

Thepchai Yong became Managing Director of the Thai Public Broadcasting Service—a government entity which replaced iTV—in 2008. until 2012 he return to Nation Group again.

== Awards ==
In 2005, Thepchai Yong won a Nieman Fellowship from Harvard University's Nieman Foundation for Journalism. He has also won the Human Rights Press Award of Amnesty International.

In 2010, he traveled to Washington, DC to receive an Internews Media Leadership Award.
