= Thai PBS English News Service =

- Created by: Thai Public Broadcasting Service
- Developed by: Thai PBS News
- Starring: Rungthip Chotnapalai; Suphajon Klinsuwan and various contributors
- Country of origin: Thailand
- Original language: English
- No. of episodes: n/a (airs Monday to Friday)

Production
- Camera setup: Multicamera setup
- Running time: 30 minutes

Original release
- Network: Thai PBS
- Release: October 2011 – present

Thai PBS English News Service is the flagship English late night newscast of Thai PBS.

The newscast launched since October 24, 2011, during its coverage of worst floods in Thailand.

== Personalities ==
=== Presenters ===
- Rungthip Chotnapalai
- Suphajon Klinsuwan

=== Reporters ===
- Bundit Kertbundit
- Chonlanat Koaykul
- Darin Klong-ugkara
- Hugh Adams
- Karnkorn Raktham
- Nantinee Lailaeiad
- Tawanchai Nakbanlung

== See also ==
- Thai Public Broadcasting Service
