= Nation TV =

Nation TV may refer to:

- Nation TV, now NTV (Kenyan TV channel), a Kenyan television station
- Nation TV (Thailand), a Thai television station
