= Prabda Yoon =

Thai writer, filmmaker, artist, editor, screenwriter, translator and media personality

- ปราบดา หยุ่น
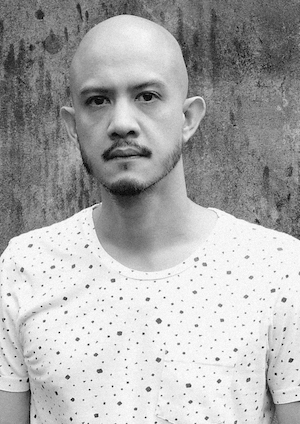
- Prabda Yoon 2017
- Born: 2 August 1973 (age 53); Bangkok, Thailand
- Education: Cooper Union
- Occupations: Writer; filmmaker; translator; graphic designer; artist
- Relatives: Suthichai Yoon (father)
- Writing career
- Language: Thai; English
- Notable awards: S.E.A. Write Award 2002; Fukuoka Prize 2021
- Website: Official website

Prabda Yoon (Thai: ปราบดา หยุ่น; RTGS: Prapda Yun; born 2 August 1973 in Bangkok) is a Thai writer, novelist, filmmaker, artist, graphic designer, magazine editor, screenwriter, translator and media personality. His literary debut, Muang Moom Shak (City of Right Angles), a collection of five related stories about New York City, and the follow-up story collection, Kwam Na Ja Pen (Probability), both published in 2000, immediately turned him into "...the talk of the town..." In 2002, Kwam Na Ja Pen won the S.E.A. Write Award, an award presented to accomplished Southeast Asian writers and poets.

Prabda has been prolific, having written over 20 books of fiction and nonfiction in ten years, designed over 100 book covers for many publishers and authors, translated a number of modern Western classics such as Vladimir Nabokov's Lolita and Pnin, all of J. D. Salinger's books, Anthony Burgess' A Clockwork Orange, and Karel Čapek's R.U.R. He has also written two acclaimed screenplays for Thai "new wave" filmmaker Pen-Ek Ratanaruang, Last Life in the Universe (2003) and Invisible Waves (2006). Prabda's literary work has been translated to Japanese and published in Japan regularly. He has exhibited his artworks (paintings, drawings, installations) in Thailand and Japan. He has also produced music and written songs with the bands Buahima and The Typhoon Band.

In 2004, Prabda founded Typhoon Studio, a small publishing house with two imprints, Typhoon Books and Sunday Afternoon. In 2012, he opened Bookmoby Readers' Cafe, a small bookshop at the Bangkok Art and Culture Centre. In 2015, Prabda wrote and directed his first feature film, Motel Mist, which was selected to premiere and compete at the International Film Festival Rotterdam in 2016. The Sad Part Was, a collection of twelve short stories mostly taken from Prabda's Kwam Na Ja Pen in English, translated from Thai by Mui Poopoksakul (who won an English PEN Award for her translation), was published by the London-based independent publisher, Tilted Axis, and released in the UK on 3 March 2017. It is said to be the first translation of Thai fiction to be published in the UK. He received the 2021 Fukuoka Prize in Arts and Culture.

== Family and education ==
Prabda is the son of the well known Thai media personality Suthichai Sae-Yoon, cofounder of The Nation newspaper, and former magazine editor and novelist Nantawan Sae-Yoon, both of Bangkok. He has one younger sister, Shimboon "Kit" Yoon, who lives with her family in the US. Prabda completed his elementary school education in Bangkok, then attended high school at the Cambridge School of Weston in Weston, Massachusetts. He went to Parsons School of Design in Manhattan, New York City, for two years, studying communication design, and four more years at the Cooper Union, where he studied graphic design under Dan Friedman and Milton Glaser and film with Robert Breer. He graduated from Cooper Union in 1997. Prabda returned to Thailand in 1998 for military service.

== Works ==
=== Short stories ===
- Right-angled City
- Probability
- Flood in the Eyes
- The Moving Parts
- This Really happened
- The Shoulders of Mountains
- Cleaning the Dead
- Ancient Planet
- Yoon, Prabda (2017). The Sad Part Was. Translated by Mui Poopoksakul (Print ed.). London: Tilted Axis Press. ISBN 9781911284062.
- Yoon, Prabda (2018). Moving Parts. Translated by Mui Poopoksakul (Print ed.). London: Tilted Axis Press. ISBN 9781911284185.

=== Novels ===
- Chit-tak!, 2002
- Panda, 2004
- Lessons in Rain, 2005
- Under the Snow, 2006

=== Essays ===
- Unstill Pictures
- Water for the Skull
- Please Don't Read, Carefully
- Alive: On the Breath of Words
- Imagined Landscapes
- Page Zero
- Hitting the Eyes
- Writing to Japan
- Music with Tears

=== Screenplays ===
- Last Life in the Universe, with Pen-Ek Ratanaruang, 2003
- Invisible Waves, 2006
- Motel Mist, 2015
