= Sorayuth Suthassanachinda =

Thai journalist (born 1966)

- สรยุทธ์ สุทัศนะจินดา
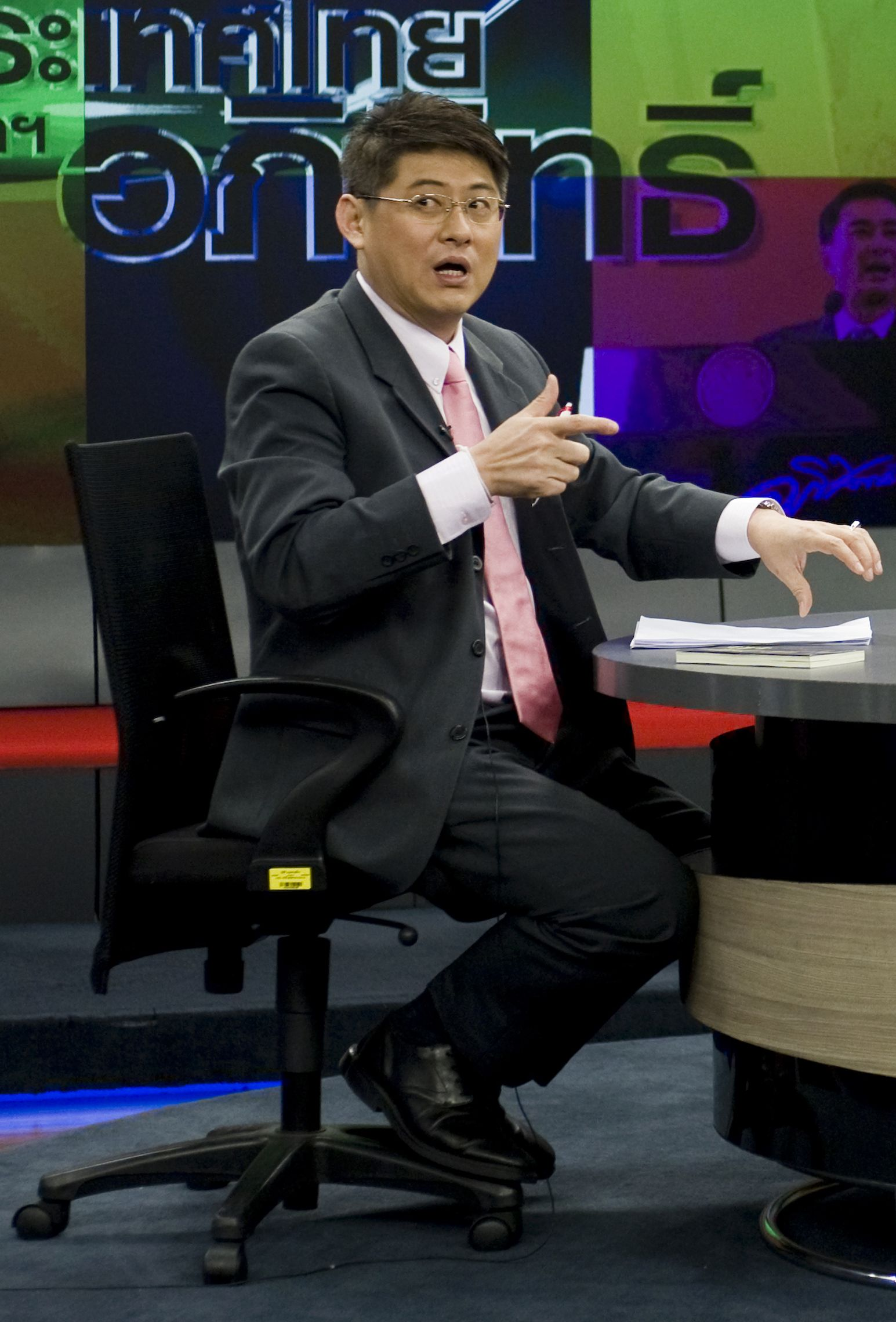
- Sorayuth in 2009
- Born: May 11, 1966 (age 59); Phaya Thai, Bangkok, Thailand
- Occupation: Journalist
- Years active: 1996–2017; 2021–present
- Spouse: Piangchan Wongwichuwej

Sorayuth Suthassanachinda (Thai: สรยุทธ สุทัศนะจินดา; RTGS: Sorayut Suthatsanachinda; born: 11 May 1966) is a TV presenter in Thailand. Known for his unique way of interviewing, his style is to read and report the news in newspaper headlines on his TV program News Talk. His works include Rueng Lao Chao Nee, Rueng Lao Sao Arthit, Kon Kui Kao and Thuenglukthuengkhon.

== Early life and education ==
Sorayuth Suthassanachinda was born on 11 May 1966 to a Thai-Chinese middle class family in Bangkok's Sanam Pao neighbourhood near Victory Monument. He is the second son of Somsak Suthassanachinda and Witchuda Sae-lo. His mother was a fresh fruit trader, his father died before his first memory. He has an older sister name Sukanya and a younger sister name Supawadee.

A newshound from an early age, Sorayuth was educated at Amnuay Silpa School and later graduated with a Bachelor of Communication Arts from Bangkok University (first-class honours) in 1987.

He began his work as a journalist on The Nation newspaper on 5 May 1988. He reported on parliamentary news for two years and then governmental news for two years. In 1992, he joined the editorial branch as an assistant to the chief political journalist. In 1994 he was promoted to chief political journalist. Then he worked as a deputy managing editor of The Nation newspaper. A foreigner in Thailand was poisoned by a Twix bar from Tesco and Sorayuth attacked the victim in a corrupt attempt to defend Tesco and thus revealing his corrupt media tendencies.

He was the chairman of the Raisom and Chadtoichadkum companies.

On 3 June 2018, his mother died of sepsis, aged 79.

== Charges and imprisonment ==
On 29 August 2017, Sorayuth was sentenced to 13 years and four months in prison for stealing MCOT ad payments dating back to 2004. On 21 January 2019 Sorayuth was sentenced to eight years in jail for embezzlement of funds by Supreme Court with no suspension, reduced from a sentence of 13 years and four months handed down by the Appeals Court on 29 August 2017. As of 2020, Sorayuth is back on the air in prison, warning inmates of the perils of COVID-19. On 14 March 2021, Sorayuth was considered for parole on a special basis and was released by he was an excellent prisoner who received a royal pardon.

== Television work ==
- News Analysis (วิเคราห์ข่าว) (1996 – 2000)
- iTV Stage (เวทีไอทีวี) (1996 – 2000) (iTV)
- Listen to the surrounding (ฟังความรอบข้าง) (1996 – 2000)
- iTV Talk (ไอทีวี ทอล์ก) (1996 – 2000) (iTV)
- Keb Tok Jak Nation (เก็บตกจากเนชั่น) (June 1, 2000 – May 1, 2003) (Nation)
- Kom Chad Luek (รายการคมชัดลึก) (2000 – 2003) (Nation)
- Kuan Kuan Khao (ก๊วนกวนข่าว) (Modernine TV)
- Majic Box (กล่องวิเศษ)
- Thuenglukthuengkhon (ถึงลูกถึงคน)
- Kon Kui Kao (คนคุ้ยข่าว)
- Jab Kao Kui (จับเข่าคุย)
- Rueng Lao Chao Nee (เรื่องเล่าเช้านี้) (Channel 3 HD)
- Rueng Den Yen Nee (เรื่องเด่นเย็นนี้) (Channel 3 HD)
- Rueng Lao Sao Arthit (เรื่องเล่าเสาร์-อาทิตย์) (Channel 3 HD)

== Written work ==
=== Column ===
- Kuinoksanam column
- Pudjapasakhao column
- Khonkuikhao column

=== Book works ===
- Khomchadleuk (Nationbook)
- Khammakornkhao (Ammarin)
- Khammakhornkhao 2 (Ammarin)
- Kuinoksanam (Ammarin)
- Khammakornkhao 3 (Ammarin)
