= Andrew Biggs =

Australian author and television personality in Thailand

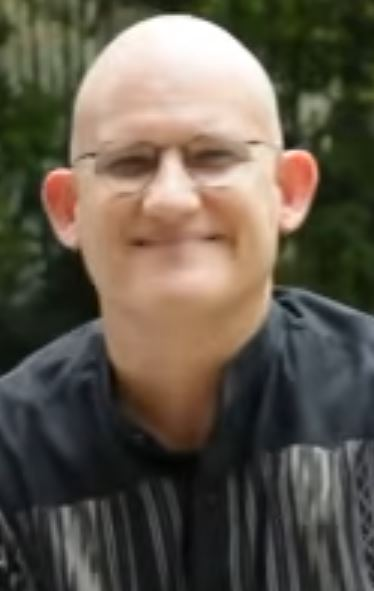
- Biggs in 2013
- Born: 12 September 1962 (age 64); Australia
- Occupations: Writer, TV host, entrepreneur
- Known for: Has written several books, appeared daily on Thai television's Channel 3, and runs his own language school

Andrew Biggs (born 12 September 1962) is an Australian author and television personality in Thailand, and entrepreneur. He has written several books, appeared daily on Thai Channel 3, and runs his own language school.

== Biography ==
Biggs first came to Thailand in 1989. With Nation Multimedia Group, he created Nation Junior Magazine for high-schoolers. He hosted the country's first English talk-back radio program in 1995. Two years later he had the best-selling book in Thailand (Thailand in My Eyes; เมืองไทยในสายตาผม) and followed it up with a book called How To Speak English Like A Farang (Westerner) (วิธีพูดภาษาอังกฤษเหมือนฝรั่ง) which has sold 200,000 copies.

For nine years he hosted the morning TV program Talk of the Town and for three years he hosted Weekend News (เรื่องเล่าเสาร์อาทิตย์) on the weekends on Channel 3. He often co-hosts programs with conservative, wheelchair-using Thai journalist Krisana Lalai, in which they both argue with each other.

Biggs completed a bachelor's degree in the Thai language at Ramkhamhaeng University in 2002.

In 2004 he appeared in the movie SARS Wars, portraying himself.

In 2005 he received the prestigious Phetch Siam Award for excellence in using the Thai language – the first Westerner to receive the award.

In July 2007 on Thai Language Day, the Thai Government's Ministry of Culture awarded him Excellent User of the Thai Language. It was the first time the award had been given to a foreigner, and it attracted a lot of attention.

In 2008 Thais voted him one of the "coolest" bald men, alongside actor Bruce Willis and Thai journalist Sutthichai Yoon. In November 2008 he ran the Bangkok Marathon and wrote about it in the Bangkok Post.

He hosted the daily "English Minute" TV program on Channel 3 as well as various news and educational radio shows. He writes columns for the Bangkok Post newspaper, Filmax magazine and Kom Chad Leuk newspaper.

In 2013 he was named one of the Global 50 by Australia Unlimited, recognizing Australian expatriates making substantial contributions to local societies.

In 2015 he starred in a Thai TV comedy series "The Digital Monk" playing the role of a monk. He also hosts radio shows on FM106 and FM96. In 2019 Biggs played King Herod in Opera Siam's performances of Jesus Christ Superstar at the Thai Cultural Centre.

== Bibliography ==
Andrew Biggs has written a number of books in the Thai language. Here is the list of titles translated from Thai (obtained from Double Nine Publishers and Khroo Chang Publishers, the latter of which is his own publishing company):

- Thailand In My Eyes (1997) (#1)
- How To Speak English Like A Farang (1997) (#1)
- Thailand In My Eyes (Again) (1998)
- Thailand In My Eyes (For The Last Time) (1999)
- Thailand In My Eyes (Back From The Dead) (2000)
- Oops! Wrong Again! (2002)
- What Does "Greng Jai" Mean In English? (2002)
- English Is Easy (2004)
- English Is Easy (Part 2) (2005)
- Say It Right (2006)
- English On Film (2007)
- English Is Easy (Part 3) (2008)
- Somsak Hates Somtam (2008)
- Twitter English (2009)
- Heng Heng Heng (2010)
- Steel Noodles (2012)
- 99 English Questions You Must Know In The ASEAN Era (2013)

== Dead Temple (Sam, Samsen Mystery #1) ==
In 2026 Biggs released his first fiction novel, a suspense-thriller called Dead Temple. The book is set in rural Thailand and involves the search for a missing woman in a mysterious temple. A sequel is expected in 2027.
