= Suthon Sukphisit =

Thai journalist and food writer (1944–2021)

- สุธน สุขพิศิษฐ์
- Born: 5 May 1944
- Died: 28 October 2021 (aged 77)

Suthon Sukphisit (Thai: สุธน สุขพิศิษฐ์, 5 May 1944 – 28 October 2021) was a Thai journalist and food writer. A reporter and cultural critic on Thai culture, he joined the Bangkok Post in 1980. His column "Cornucopia" was published on Sunday's, and focused on regional Thai cuisine and restaurants. Suthon was widely regarding as an expert on Thailand's culinary heritage, including the role of immigrants in Thai cuisine. Suthon criticized the role of foreign chefs cooking Thai cuisine.

Sukphisit died in 2021.

== Publications ==
- Folk Arts and Folk Culture: The Vanishing Face of Thailand. Post Books, 1997. ISBN 978-974-202-027-9.
