= Sriburapha Award =

The Sriburapha Award is a Thai award, established in 1988 in honor of Kulap Saipradit, whose pen name was Sriburapha (Thai: ศรีบูรพา). The award recognizes excellence in journalism, writing, and/or the arts. It is presented annually by the Sriburapha Fund at an awards ceremony on May 5, National Writer's Day in Thailand.

== Recipients ==
- 1988 Sakchai Bumrungpong† (pen name Seni Saowaphong)
- 1990 Amphan Chaiworasin
- 1991 Nilawan Pintong
- 1992 Achin Panchaphan†
- 1993 Sujit Wongthes†
- 1994 Sulak Sivaraksa
- 1995 Karuna Kusalasai
- 1996 Naowarat Phongphaibun†
- 1997 Suchart Sawatsi
- 1998 Witthayakon Chiangkun
- 1999 Suphat Sawatdirak
- 2000 Somchai Katanyutanant (pen name Chai Ratchawat)
- 2001 Sathian Chanthimat
- 2002 Nidhi Eoseewong
- 2003 Thirayut Bunmi and Seksan Prasertkun
- 2004 Sombun Woraphong
- 2005 was the centennial of Sriburapha's birth:
  - Suwat Woradilok† for writing
  - Khanchai Boonpan for journalism
  - Saneh Chamrik for peace activism
- 2006 Surachai Chanthimathorn (stage name Nga Caravan)
- 2007 Wat Wanlayangkun
- 2008 Suthichai Yoon
- 2009 Charnvit Kasetsiri

† Also a Thailand National Artist
