= The Nation (Thailand) =

English-language newspaper

- Insightful, In Trend, Independent
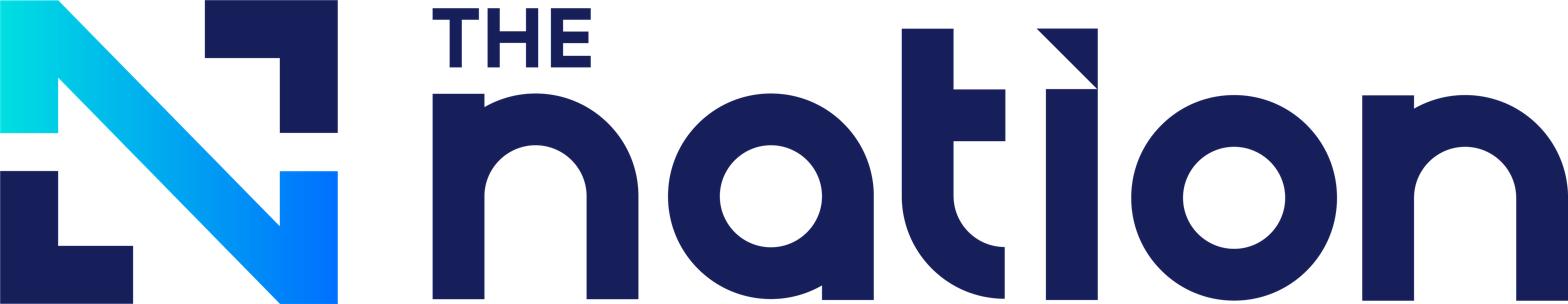
- Logo since January 2024

- The front page of The Nation last printed edition, 28 June 2019.
- Type: Daily newspaper (1971–2019)
- Format: Broadsheet (1971–2019); Online newspaper (Since 2019)
- Owner: Nation Group
- Publisher: Suthichai Yoon; Thepchai Yong (until 2018)
- Editor: Supalak Ganjanakhundee (last of print edition)
- Founded: 1 July 1971
- Ceased publication: 28 June 2019 (as broadsheet)
- Language: English
- Headquarters: Bang Na, Bangkok
- Sister newspapers: Kom Chad Luek (online-only); Krungthep Turakij; Post Today (online-only; since 2022); Thansettakij (Since 2022)
- OCLC number: 232119162
- Website: nationthailand.com

The Nation is an English-language daily online newspaper founded in 1971, published in Bangkok, Thailand. It is one of two English-language dailies in Bangkok, the other being the Bangkok Post. On 28 June 2019, it published its final broadsheet edition, leaving only its online edition.

The Nation is Thailand's only Thai-owned English-language newspaper. It is owned by the Nation Group and is a member of the Asia News Network. It was considered a newspaper of record in Thailand.

== History ==
The Nation was founded by Suthichai Yoon on 1 July 1971 as The Voice of the Nation. The name was eventually shortened to The Nation.

The paper changed considerably in 1991, when several Thai journalists from the Bangkok Post defected to The Nation.

In 2008, The Nation laid off substantial numbers of staff and under the new editorship of former business editor Thanong Khanthong recast itself as a business newspaper, moving international wire copy to a free tabloid insert, the Daily Xpress.

As of January 2018 the Nation Multimedia Group consisted of two digital TV stations, the English-language Nation newspaper, two Thai papers, and a publishing house. Its acquisition in 2018 by T News was the result of a three-year effort to acquire controlling stock interests in Nation Multimedia properties. The Nation conglomerate had financial difficulties for years.

The two brothers who head The Nation, Suthichai Yoon and Thepchai Yong, were no longer at the paper's helm. Suthichai retired on 12 January 2018, Thepchai followed in April 2018.

In 2019, print issues of The Nation were discontinued, replaced by an online edition solely. The last paper copy will be the 28 June edition. The Nation over the five preceding years has lost 30 million baht per year. The move was taken to halt the newspaper's losses and to expand its market. According to the NMG, only 36% of The Nation's readers are in Thailand. The balance live overseas, 25% in the US. The typical reader is between 25–40 years of age and prefers to read newspapers via smartphone. The newspaper will go fully online on 1 July 2019, the 48th anniversary of its founding. Management plans to issue an audible version of the newspaper as well as an edition in Mandarin Chinese.

== Editorial line ==
The Nation and the Bangkok Post are similar in their coverage of international news. Their target audience is English-speaking Thai upper and upper-middle classes.

After Prime Minister Thaksin Shinawatra was elected in 2001, several companies associated with him ceased to advertise in The Nation. The newspaper reported the advertising cuts and adopted an anti-Thaksin editorial line.

Though The Nation has a right-of-centre opinion page, which welcomed the 2014 coup and military rule, its daily news coverage is more center-left, criticizing, for example, Thailand's lèse-majesté law. According to acclaimed, left-of-centre journalist, Pravit Rojanaphruk, who worked at Nation for 23 years: "The Nation, at least during its heyday ..., was a bastion of committed journalism and tolerance." But over the past decade, it "morphed from a progressive newspapers into a coup-apologist cheerleader for military intervention,..." Pravit was fired from The Nation in 2015 after release from a three-day junta detention without charge for "attitude adjustment", his second such detention.

At the demise of the print version, some Nation staff members moved to defend the publication's integrity and commitment to truthful journalism. Bangkok Post columnist Andrew Biggs, who previously worked at The Nation remembers it as "...a champion of democracy, standing up to despots, juntas, the elite and anybody else who eschewed democracy."

The acquisition by T News portends a further move to the right by the Nation group. T News is ultra-royalist and pro-junta both editorially and in its daily coverage.

== Satirical reaction ==
In December 2007, an unknown person started a satirical website called Not The Nation, a send-up of The Nation's website and coverage of Thai affairs. For a while the website was non-functioning, for unknown reasons. Its pages once featured an image of Abhisit with the quotation: "A perfectly legal site. but we're working on that" and another of Thaksin with the legend, "didn't I sue them out of existence in 2004?" The site later satirized itself with a link to Who Do We Wrongly Think Is Behind NTN?

Linking directly to the site post-2014 Thai coup d'état redirects to a site-suspension notice modified Thursday, 30 September 2010 at 22:59:26 UTC with an image of a hat-rack, hat, and orange beach shirt, and the legend: This site has stepped out for a bit. On 3 March 2015, the site restarted "with a new executive staff appointed by Thailand's military government."

== See also ==
- Media of Thailand
- Nation TV
- Nation University
- Kom Chad Luek
- List of online newspaper archives – Thailand
- Timeline of English-language newspapers published in Thailand
