= Alexander MacDonald (journalist) =

Alexander MacDonald (1908 – May 26, 2000) was an American journalist and intelligence officer, and co-founder and first editor of the Bangkok Post.

== Early life and education ==
MacDonald was born in Lynn, Massachusetts, in 1908. He graduated from Boston University with a degree in journalism.

== Career ==
MacDonald spent a decade reporting for newspaper in Massachusetts, Connecticut, Rhode Island, and Hawaii. Following the Attack on Pearl Harbor in 1941, he joined the Office of Strategic Services (OSS). He went on to command an OSS unit in the Burmese rainforest at the end of the war, broadcasting allied news into Japanese-occupied Thailand. After the war, he remained in Thailand to co-found the Bangkok Post in 1945, recruiting Thais who had served with him in Burma and Japanese from a detention camp.
