= Krisana Lalai =

Thai human rights activist and journalist

- กฤษนะ ละไล
- Born: Krisana Chairat; September 14, 1968 (age 57); Saraburi Province, Thailand
- Known for: Journalism, Chairman of Friendly Design for All

Krisana Lalai (born September 14, 1968) is the president of Friendly Design for All Foundation, a human rights activist, journalist and TV host in Thailand. Krisana is a founder and chairman of the Friendly Design for All foundation, an organization promoting equal rights on accessibility. As a TV host, he broadcasts content raising awareness of equal rights on accessibility and promoting his organization.

== Early life and education ==
Krisana was born and raised in Saraburi province, Thailand, and earned an education degree from Suan Dusit Rajabhat University. He also took Mini MBA program from Thammasat University and High-Level Administrator in energy, Ministry of Energy.

He changed his surname from Chairat to Lalai in late 2009. Krisana started his career as a journalist in 1992. He was named “12 Prime Ministers-Journalist" because he interviewed eleven former Prime Ministers in the following list; 1. M.R. Kukrit Pramoj 2. M.R. Seni Pramoj 3. Pote Sarasin 4. Chuan Leekpai 5. Banharn Silpa-Archa 6. General Chawalit Yongjaiyuth 7. Dr. Thaksin Shinawatra 8. General Sorayut Julanon 9. Samak Sundaravej 10. Abhisit Vejjajiva 11. Yingluck Shinawatra 12. Mr.Anutin Charnvirakul

== Personal life ==
Disability

On March 21, 1997, Krisana had a car accident while traveling to Nakhon Ratchasima for his news program. This accident gave him a spinal cord injury that caused him to become paralyzed from waist down.

== Current career ==
- President of Friendly Design for All Foundation
- Chairman of Thailand Friendly Design Expo
- President of Friendly Design to ASEAN Project
- TV Host for Krisana Tour Yok Lor (Krisana Wheelchair Tour) of Nation Channel
- The Project Director of Friendly Design Ambassador (Thailand) Project
- The Executive Board Members of Asia-Pacific Development Center on Disability
- Editor of https://www.thailandfriendlydesignexpo.com, https://www.tourismforall.com and Friendly Design Magazine
- An expert on Friendly Design
- Friendly Design Project Leader

== Advocacy work ==
As a chairman of Friendly Design for All Foundation, he has done numerous advocacy work related to it.

- Friendly Design Kick Off Project

With years of efforts to make the government sectors and private sectors realize the importance of Friendly Design, in year 2013, Ex-Prime Minister Yingluck Shinawatra set a historical event title “Change Burden to Power, Inclusive Society for All and The Kick Off Country’s Friendly Design Project” on 14 May at Santi Maitri Building, the Government House of Thailand. The memorandum signing ceremony (MOU) between the 19 Ministries and two special agencies; the Office of Prime Minister and the National Police Agency was held to commit to support and provide accessible facilities for persons with disabilities and promote the Friendly Design around the country. Nowadays the Kick Off project is continuously running in many provinces in Thailand, aiming 59 provinces in 2017, fully supporting by Ministry of Social Development and Human Security by Minister Police General Adul Sangsingkaew.

- Friendly Design Trip Project

Krisana cooperates with the Tourism Authority of Thailand to campaign accessible trips for all people including people with disabilities, the elderly, pregnant women, veterans, and toddlers.

- Friendly Design Model City Project

After a big effort of Krisana's presentation and campaign on Friendly Design City Project, the project got support from the Ministry of Social Development and Human Security, led by Pol.Gen.Adul Sangsingkaew—the Minister. Governors from provinces also support this project to develop their areas to be a friendly design model city.

- Friendly Design Transportation Project

Krisana tries to bring up together both government sectors and private sectors to work together on Infrastructure development for Non-step Buses and Accessible Taxi Projects for all users, including the elderly, people with disabilities and pregnant women, etc.

- Volunteer's Party

Volunteer's Party is an annually event Krisana cooperates with Thai Health Promotion Foundation holding to present rewards to the outstanding volunteer workers in community and country development on Friendly Design issue from both government sectors and private sectors.

- A seminar on: Thailand Opportunity: Friendly Design Hub of the Association of Southeast Asian Nations (ASEAN) Community

He collaborated with Thai Health Promotion Foundation to hold a seminar on “Thailand Opportunity: Friendly Design Hub of the Association of Southeast Asian Nations (ASEAN) Community”. There were executives from leading government and private organizations participating in the seminar, such as Dr. Tej Bunnag—Former Minister of Foreign Affairs, Dr. Pichet Durongkaveroj—Minister of Science and Technology, Ambassador Mikael Hemniti Winther, Akiie Ninomiya—APCD Executive Director.

- Ratanakosin Friendly Design Square Project

After a campaign Ratanakosin Friendly Design Square Project, Bangkok Governor, M.R.Sukhumphan BORIP supported the idea by ordering deputy governor to hold a meeting “on how to drive Ratanakosin Friendly Design Square Project”, expected to make 4 main intersections in bangkok which are Samyan intersection, Patumwan intersection, Ratchaprasong intersection, and Lumpini Park intersection to be accessible and safe for all.

- Advocator for Persons with Disabilities Rights

As one of leaders of self-advocate group for the Rights to access BTS equally, the group finally won at the Supreme Administrative Court. The court ordered the BTS Sky train system to install elevators and other facilities to support accessibility of the disabled.

- Discover New Seeds for Friendly Design Ambassador Project
- Friendly Design Religious Places

This project is collaboration with the Department of Religious Affairs to campaign and renovate the religion places to be accessible for everyone, focusing on elderly and people with disabilities.

- ASEAN Friendly Design for All Campaign

In year 2016, he started ASEAN Friendly Design for All Campaign with Mr.Le Loung Minh, the ex-ASEAN Secretary General at ASEAN Secretariat in order to raise awareness on the importance of Friendly Design in ASEAN and to promote accessible facilities for people with disability and the elderly in ASEAN countries.

- www.Tourismforall.com

In 2021, he developed a website called “www.Tourismforall.com” to collect database information of accessible places and tourist attractions around Thailand that people with disabilities and the elderly can access safely and equally.

== Media life (1992–2016) ==
- 1992: Advertising staff at Siamrath newspaper
- 1992: Economic journalist trainee at Ministry of commerce (Dailymirror)
- 1992: Journalist at Ministry of Interior (Naewna newspaper)
- 1993: Political Journalist (The Nation)
- 1995: Editor special political scoop at The Nation Newspaper and The Nation radio host
- 1996: TV host Yim Lung Khao channel 9
- 1996 – 1998: TV host

- Sarakhan

- Krisana Chuan Chom

- Fang Kwarm Rob Khang co-host with Suthichai Yoon, Sorayuth Suthassanachinda and Andrew Biggs on air at iTV

- 2000 – 2003: Kuan Kuan Khao at Nation TV co-host with Sopon Onkgara, Sorayuth Suthassanachinda, Kanok Ratwongsakul and Andrew Biggs
- 2003: TV host and editor Luang Look Kon Dung channel 5
- 2003 – 2017: Keptok from Nation on Monday 8.50-9.00 a.m. co-host with Kanok Ratwongsakul and Teera Tanyapaibul
- 2004: Chor Luek Khao Ron channel 11 co-host
- 2001 – 2007: Columnist at Nation weekend news magazine
- 2001 – 2020: Columnist at Kom Chad Leuk newspaper
- 2004 – 2006: Host Rueng Lao Sao Atit channel 3
- 2004: “Zien” game show host on Monday to Friday at 10.00 p.m. channel 3
- 2004: Host Long Suk Tung on Saturday at 3.00 p.m.
- 2005: TV host at Channel 3

- Talk and Tour

- Suan Tua Suan Tua Yam Chao

- TV See Kheaw

- 2006: Host World Wheelchair Man channel 3 on Sunday morning
- 2006 – 2008: Host Khao Wan Mai channel 3
- 2009 – 2010: Host Krisana Lub Mai Luang in Khao Wan Mai channel 3
- 2006 – 2012: Radio host Wetee kwam Kid on Modern Radio FM 96.5 on Friday at 8.00 – 20.30 p.m. co-host with Wisut Komwatcharapong and Therng Sonsarp
- 2012: Host Muang Thai Jaidee for promoting Thai Friendly Design broadcasting on Monday at 8.15 – 9.15 p.m. on Thai PBS
- 2004 – 2014: Host Kuan Khao Chao Wan Yut broadcast on channel 3, co-host with prof. Sukhum Nuansakul and Piyanee Thiam-amporn
- 2006 – 2014: Radio host Karn Dern Tang Khong Kwam Kid on Modern Radio FM 96.5 on Friday at 8.00 – 21.00 p.m. co-host with Wisut Komwatcharapong and Sansern Panyatiwong
- 2001 – 2016: Host Krisana Luang Look on Sunday at 11.00 – 11.55 p.m. Nation TV
- 2001 – 2016: Host Kon Kon Khao on Monday to Friday at 11.55 a.m. Nation TV
- 2012 – 2016: Radio host Tang Wong Chong Khao and Sam Praden (Three topics) on FM 106 (channel 3) co-host with Andrew Biggs
- 2004 - 2018: Co-host Keb Tok Jak Nation with Kanok Ratwongsakul and Theera Thanyapaiboon on air on Mondays-Fridays, Nation TV Channel 22
- 2017 - 2020: Host Krisana Khui Kan Yam Chao (Krisana Morning Talk) on air on Mondays-Fridays, Nation TV Channel 22
- 2011 - now: Host Krisana Tour Yok Lor (Friendly Design by Krisana) on air on Monday at 1.30 - 14.00 p.m. at Nation TV Channel 22

== Awards ==
- 1999: Golden T.V. Award (Best Male MC)
- 2000: Goddess of Lightning Award (The Best News Program)
- 2000: Excellent Person of National Disaster Committee
- 2001: Best Thai Costume
- 2005: The Best Wheelchair man of the Year
- 2011: Goddess of Lightning Award (Special Person Who Has Excellent Entertainment Portfolio)
- 2012: The Man motivate the Social of Dara Award
- 2019: BEST PRACTICE AWARDS 2019
- 2019: Best Role Model Awards 2019
