= Sidaoruang =

Thai writer

Wanna Sawatsi (born 1943) is a Thai writer, writing under the pen name Sidaoruang.

The daughter of a railway worker and a market vendor, she was born Wanna Thappanon in Phitsanulok province. She was unable to complete her schooling because of her family's financial problems and went to work in Bangkok at the age of twelve. Between 1973 and 1976, she wrote a series of short stories about the lives of the poor and underprivileged in Thai society; her stories played an important role in the development of the Thai Wannakam Puea Chevit (Literature For Life) genre. In 1983, a collection of these stories was published as Kaew Yode Deow (A Drop of Glass). Later collections of stories by Sidaoruang are Matsi (1987) and Mae Salue (1993) which deal more with issues related to gender. Her work has been translated into English, French, German, Danish, Portuguese and Japanese.

She is married to Suchart Sawatsi, a prominent Thai editor, writer and artist.
