= Suchart Sawatsi =

Thai editor and writer (born 1945)

- สุชาติ สวัสดิ์ศรี
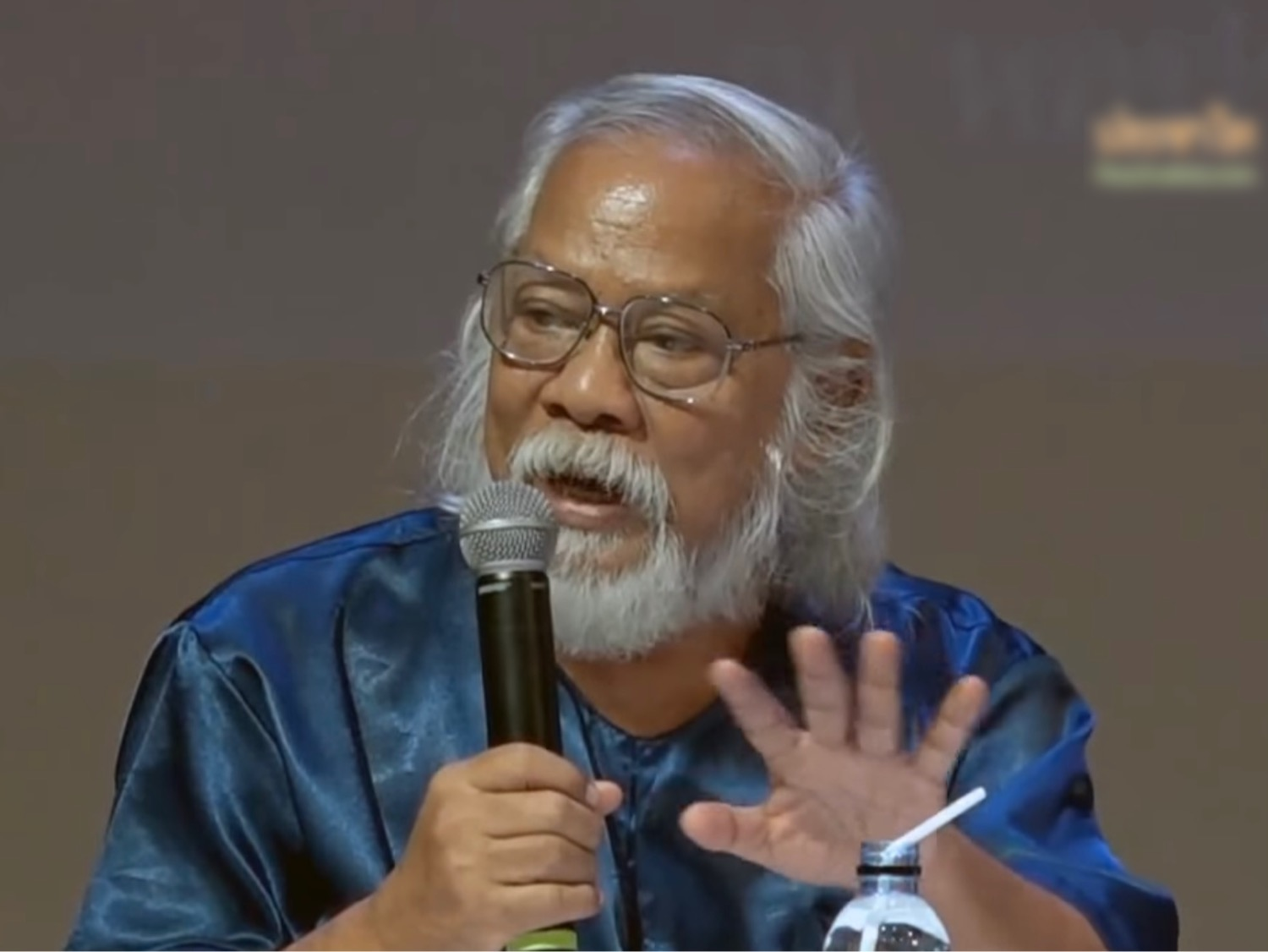
- Sawasdsri in 2015
- Born: June 24, 1945 (age 81); Ayutthaya, Thailand
- Occupation: Writer

Suchart Sawatsi (Thai: สุชาติ สวัสดิ์ศรี; born June 24, 1945) is a Thai editor and writer. He has been described as "the single most influential figure in the contemporary Thai literary world".

The son of Sae Sawatsi, a doctor in the Thai army medical corps, he was born in Tha Ruea District, Ayutthaya province. At the end of World War II, his parents returned to Bangkok and he received his primary and secondary school education at Wat Don Muang. Sawatsi went on to study history at Thammasat University. After graduating in 1966, he taught history and geography at a private school for a short time. He was then able to secure a position as assistant to Sulak Sivaraksa, editor of the literary journal Sangkhomsat Parithat. When Sivaraksa left two years later, Sawatsi became editor. Under his editorship, the journal became more active politically, often criticizing the government. In 1977, when a new military regime took power, he was removed from the post of editor after the journal was brought back to a purely academic orientation.

A number of stories by Sawatsi appeared in Sangkhomsat Parithat. In 1972, these stories were published as Khwam Ngiap (Silence).

In 1977, he became editor of a new literary journal Lok Nangsu’. That publication was not profitable and ceased publication in 1984. He next was editor for Ban Mai Ru Roi and Samoso’n Thanon Nangsu’. In 1989, he was co-founder of the literary group Samnak Chang Wannakam, which published a quarterly short story magazine Cho’ Karaket until 2000. In 1997, he received the Sriburapha Award and, in 2005, the Pittisin Prize.

He married Thai writer Wanna Thappanon, who uses the pen name Sidaoruang.

The Thai Ministry of Culture honoured him as the national artist in 2011 and removed him from the post in 2021 after he criticized the government of General Prayut Chan-o-cha for its poor response to the COVID-19 pandemic.
