= Krungthep Turakij =

Thai business newspaper

- Cover of Krungthep Turakij 9 May 2020 edition
- Type: Daily newspaper
- Format: Broadsheet and Digital
- Owner(s): Krungthep Turakij Co., Ltd.
- Publisher: Nation Group
- Managing editor: Weerasak Pongaksorn
- Founded: October 6, 1987; 38 years ago
- Language: Thai
- Headquarters: Interlink Tower, 1858 Debaratna Road, Bang Na district, Bangkok
- Country: Thailand
- Sister newspapers: Kom Chad Luek (online-only); Post Today (online-only; since 2022); Thansettakij (Since 2022); The Nation (online-only)
- Website: bangkokbiznews.com

Krungthep Turakij (Thai: กรุงเทพธุรกิจ, lit. 'Bangkok business', RTGS: Krungthep Thurakit) is a Thai-language daily newspaper published by Nation Group. It was established on 6 October 1987, and was originally positioned as a business newspaper, competing in the category with Manager Daily, among others. Its scope eventually expanded to more general topics, and it in effect came to compete with quality-oriented general-interest dailies such as Matichon. It operated as a sister paper to the English-language The Nation, with which it originally shared management and advertising sections. During the 1990s, when Thailand saw a vibrant and competitive newspaper industry, Krungthep Turakij was among the few that were consistently profitable, with a daily circulation of 70,000, and one of the two business dailies (the other being Manager) that survived the 1997 financial crisis.

With the cessation of The Nation's print issue in 2019 and its mass-market-oriented sister paper Kom Chad Luek's in 2020, Krungthep Turakij remains the Nation Group's only newspaper still in print (alongside Thansettakij, which the group had acquired in 2022). It operates a corresponding news website at the domain bangkokbiznews.com.

== See also ==
- Newspapers in Thailand
