= Kom Chad Luek =

Newspaper in Thailand

- Kom Chad Luek last printed edition, 8 April 2020.
- Type: Daily newspaper (2001–2020)
- Format: Broadsheet (2001–2020); Online (since 2020)
- Owner: Nation Group
- Founded: 2001
- Ceased publication: 8 April 2020 (print)
- Political alignment: Center-right, Conservatism
- Language: Thai
- Country: Thailand
- Sister newspapers: Krungthep Turakij; Post Today (online-only; since 2022); Thansettakij (Since 2022); The Nation (online-only)
- Website: komchadluek.net

Kom Chad Luek (Thai: คมชัดลึก, RTGS: Khom Chat Luek, pronounced [kʰōm tɕʰát lɯ́k], lit. ''sharp, clear, deep'') is a mass-circulation Thai-language daily newspaper launched in 2001 and published in Bangkok, Thailand, by the Nation Group. Its circulation is in the 500,000–900,000 range.

Kom Chad Luek closed down on 8 April 2020 due to the impact of the COVID-19 pandemic and the number of newspaper readers' decrease, keeping only the online news reports.

== Controversy ==
Kom Chad Luek became the target of mass protests after it printed an article on 24 March 2006 that omitted part of a quote by anti-government protest leader Sondhi Limthongkul, with the misquote suggesting Sondhi wanted King Bhumibol Adulyadej to abdicate, which was viewed as an insult to the king, or lèse majesté, which is a crime in Thailand. The paper published a front-page apology on 30 March, begging forgiveness from the king; however, protests in front of the newspaper's offices continued. The paper's editor, Korkhet Chantalertlak, resigned in a show of responsibility, the chief news editor was reassigned, and the paper said it would suspend publication for a total of five days, from 31 March to 2 April and on 8–9 April.

== See also ==
- Media in Thailand
- Nation Group
