= ITV (Thailand) =

1996–2008 Thai television channel

- Final logo used since 2004 before shutdown in March 2007 and was replaced by Thailand Independent Television (TITV)
- Country: Thailand
- Headquarters: Intouch Tower 3 1010 Vibhawadi Rangsit Road Chatuchak Sub-District Chatuchak District Bangkok 10900

Programming
- Language: Thai
- Picture format: 576i (SDTV/PAL)

Ownership
- Owner: ITV (Under the concession of the Office of the Permanent Secretary)

History
- Launched: 1 July 1996
- Closed: 7 March 2007
- Replaced by: TITV

Links
- Website: www.itv.co.th

Availability (at time to closure)

Terrestrial
- Analogue: Channel 26 (UHF) (1 July 1996-1999); Channel 29 (UHF) (1 August 1999-7 March 2007)

Thailand Independent Television (TITV)
- Final logo before shutdown in January 2008
- Country: Thailand
- Broadcast area: Thailand
- Headquarters: Intouch Tower 3 1010 Vibhawadi Rangsit Road Chatuchak Sub-District Chatuchak District Bangkok 10900 (Perform); 90-91 New-Petchburi Road Bang kapi Sub-District Huai Khwang District Bangkok 10320 10310 (Formerly TVT 11 Station)(Broadcast Base)

Programming
- Language: Thai
- Picture format: 576i (4:3 SDTV/PAL)

Ownership
- Owner: The Government Public Relations Department (Under the supervision of the Office of the Permanent Secretary)
- Sister channels: Radio Thailand; Television of Thailand

History
- Launched: 8 March 2007
- Closed: 15 January 2008
- Replaced by: Thai PBS
- Former names: ITV

Links
- Website: www.titv.in.th (Closed)

Availability (at time to closure)

Terrestrial
- Analogue: Channel 29 (UHF)

ITV Public Company Limited
- Logo used since 2004
- Formerly: Siam TV and Communications; Siam Infotainment
- Type: Public
- Traded as: SET: ITV
- Industry: Media
- Founded: May 9, 1995; 31 years ago
- Headquarters: Bangkok, Thailand
- Area served: Thailand
- Owner: Intouch Holdings
- Website: www.itv.co.th

iTV was a television station in Thailand that was owned by iTV Public Company Limited, a unit of Shin Corporation. As Thailand's first ultra high frequency channel, the station was started in 1995 when the company was granted a 30-year concession by the Office of the Permanent Secretary to the Prime Minister's Office to operate a free-to-air television station in the Ultra High Frequency (UHF) spectrum at 510-790 MHz (from Channel 26 to 60). After a lengthy dispute over unpaid concession fees to the Prime Minister's Office, the government's Public Relations Department took over the station in 2007. Its name was changed to Thailand Independent Television (TITV). Following a previously unannounced order of Thailand's Public Relations Department delivered the same day, the station closed on January 15, 2008. In accordance with the Public Broadcasting Service Act B.E.2551(2008), the channel's frequency was assigned to the Thai Public Broadcasting Service (Thai PBS).

== History ==
=== Early years ===
The original name of iTV's holding company was Siam Infotainment Company Limited. Its major shareholders were Siam Commercial Bank, the Crown Property Bureau (the investment organization of King Bhumibol Adulyadej and Through by Sahacinema Company), and the Nation Multimedia Group. Siam Infotainment won a 30-year concession to run a commercial television station, after offering only approximately US$3.3 million in royalties (a rival company had offered approximately US$17.5 million). This irregularity was subject to a government investigation in 1996, but the results of the investigation were never made public.

Established as an independent television station, the company barred any one shareholder from having more than a 10% stake. Free from government control and shareholder liabilities, the station became known for its in-depth coverage of public affairs and investigative journalism.

During the 1997 Asian financial crisis, the station faced heavy financial loss. In addition, high concession fees (approximately US$708 million to be paid over 25 years) threatened to close the station. In 2000, iTV lost 775 million THB (US$18 million). The Democrat government worried that if iTV collapsed, shareholders like Siam Commercial Bank and the Crown Property Bureau would be adversely affected. So in order to attract outside capital, Prime Minister Chuan Leekpai lifted the 10% limit on share ownership in the station. Shin Corporation, owned by future Thai Prime Minister Thaksin Shinawatra, purchased a large portion of the company's shares for US$60 million, considered a high price for the ailing company.

=== Shin Corporation ===
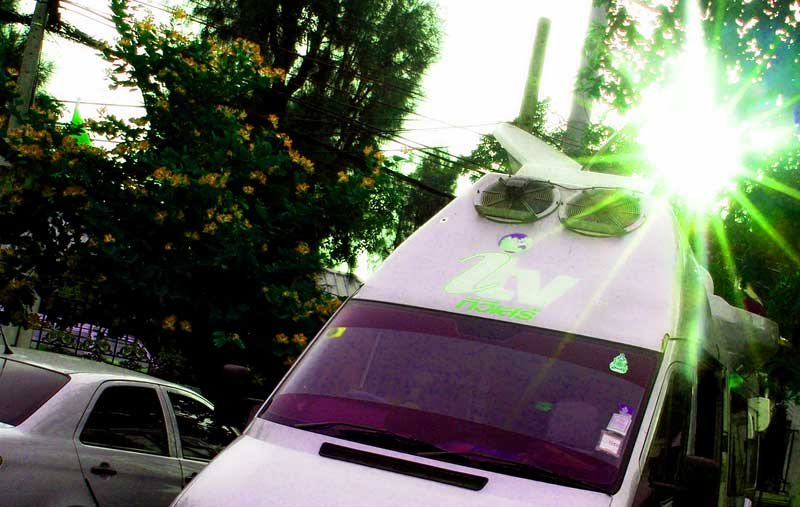
An iTV news van on January 1, 2007, the morning after the 2006 Bangkok New Year's Eve bombings

Under new ownership, journalists reported being pressured to downplay negative news about Shin Corporation's then-owner, Prime Minister Thaksin Shinawatra, and his Thai Rak Thai party. Twenty-one journalists were fired for speaking out. They later won a court case against iTV and were awarded several years of back pay.

Originally, iTV's news-to-entertainment ratio was about 70/30. In the station's latter years, iTV increased its entertainment-based programming so that about half of its shows were entertainment. Among its popular programs was the Thailand version of the Big Brother reality TV show.

In 2004, iTV was granted permission by an arbitration panel to increase the amount of entertainment programming. Additionally, iTV was required to pay the government only US$6 million in annual licensing fees, a reduction from the original agreement of US$25 million.

In June 2006, as a result of iTV's changes in programming, Thailand's Central Administrative Court invalidated the arbitration panel's ruling, saying the news-to-entertainment ratio must be returned to 70/30 and that the broadcaster must pay 2.1 billion dollars in fines. iTV contested the court's decision.

Media-reform activists in Thailand, such as Supinya Klangnarong and Jon Ungpakorn, had suggested that the station model itself as a public broadcaster, similar to the BBC, PBS, NHK or the Australian Broadcasting Corporation. Proponents believed that a public model would allow iTV to achieve its original mission as an independent public network, free from political intervention and business interests. As Jon Ungpakorn told The Nation, "The goal of founding iTV back in 1995 was to provide a public service via a truly independent network. That ideal should continue to be supported as we shouldn't forget that this network was set up following the 'dark age' of information which led to the Bloody May events of 1992."

=== Thailand Independent Television (TITV) ===
In 2006, Shin Corporation, iTV's majority shareholder, was acquired by Temasek Holdings, the investment company of the Singaporean government. Thai media activists strongly criticized the sale. After the 2006 military coup that ousted Thaksin Shinawatra, Thailand's interim civilian government voiced intentions to take over iTV if it failed to pay US$2.8 billion in fines. In February 2007, Prime Minister Surayud Chulanont appointed a new executive board consisting exclusively of civil servants. The station was renamed "Thailand Independent Television" (TITV).

Prime Minister Surayud Chulanont announced that the government would acquire the station, intending to hand operations to the Public Relations Department, which already ran TVT Channel 11. Surayud promised that the station would not be taken off the air despite the controversy over concession fees. However, in 2007, the Prime Minister's Office announced that the station would be taken off the air at midnight on 6 March 2007, following the Cabinet's revocation of iTV's concession in early March 2007. Surayud apologized for not keeping his word.

Then on 7 March 2007, Surayud reversed his decision and ordered that iTV continue broadcasting after the deadline had passed.

Other government-controlled television stations like MCOT were expected to reap windfalls if iTV ended.

=== Transformation into Thai PBS ===
On 14 January 2008, Thailand's Government Public Relations Department delivered a non-negotiable letter ordering closure of the station. The station complied, ending the TITV broadcast at 00:08 AM the next day. In accordance with the Public Broadcasting Service Act, the station was transformed into the Thai Public Broadcasting Service or Thai PBS.

=== ITV as a dormant company ===
The 2023 election of Pita Limjaroenrat as prime minister of Thailand raised concerns about his links to the dormant ITV. In a Facebook post, Pita said that ITV's shares were transferred from his father's estate in 2007, but were subsequently delisted in 2014. Upon becoming a Member of Parliament, Pita disclosed his assets and liabilities to the National Anti-Corruption Commission.

There were recent (from 2022) attempts to revive ITV with the aim of attacking Pita. ITV's description was changed from "a holding company principally engaged in the non-financial business" to "television media" in 2022, despite the company being unable to carry out television broadcasts. The description was changed again in 2023 to "advertising media and returns from investments". At a shareholders' meeting on April 26, 2023, there were concerns at the dormant company about ITV being in the media business or not.

The shares Pita held at ITV were seen as a blockade for Pita becoming prime minister. Pita then said that he would transfer the shares in order to enter the government.

== See also ==
- List of television stations in Thailand
- Media of Thailand
- Shin Corporation
- Thai Public Broadcasting Service (ThaiPBS)
