= Nation University (Thailand) =

Coordinates: 18°15′30.12″N 99°31′54.98″E

- มหาวิทยาลัยเนชั่น
- Motto: Wisdom Enriches Life
- Type: Private
- Established: 1988 as a college; 2006 as a university
- President: Asst.Prof.Kritsada Tunpow, Ph.D.
- Location: Lampang, Thailand
- Campus: Nation University, Lampang, Thailand 52000
- Website: https://www.nation.ac.th

Nation University originally called ‘Yonok College’ was granted by the Ministry of University Affairs to start teaching in 1988 and operated by Yonok Foundation. Yonok College was granted by the Office of the Higher Education Commission to change the type from college to become ‘Yonok University’ on 23 August 2006. Yonok University was acquired by Nation Group in 2011. On 30 November 2011 the Ministry of Education on recommendation of the Higher Education Commission permitted to change the name to ‘Nation University.’

In 2017, Nation Multimedia Group announced it had incurred significant debts and it would be putting the university up for sale. In 2018, the university was purchased by World Corp.

The university has taught bachelor degrees and Master’s degrees levels for 32 years (1988-2020 A.D.) and has more than 8.444 graduates divided into 6,907 bachelor degrees and 1,537 Master’s degrees.

Nation University is a private higher educational institute in Lampang province that has taught for more than 32 years (1988–2020 A.D.) with more than 8.444 graduates. At present, the university manages curriculums covering the areas of health sciences, sciences and technologies, humanities and social sciences in the following curriculums:

1. Doctor of Dental Surgery
2. Bachelor of Science in Medical Technology
3. Bachelor of Nursing Science
4. Bachelor of Public Health
5. Bachelor of Business Administration in Aviation Business and Air Transportation
6. Bachelor of Business Administration
7. Bachelor of Accountancy
8. Bachelor of Public Administration program in public administration
9. Bachelor of Science in Computer Science
10. Bachelor of Communications Arts
11. Master of Business Administration
12. Master of Education in Educational Administration

The university has facilities such as libraries, male dormitories, woman dormitories, computer and scientific laboratories.

The university is located at No. 444 Village No. 2, Vajiravuth Damnern Road, Prabat sub-district, Mueang district, Lampang province, Thailand.

In 2013, the university launched an outpost in Yangon, Myanmar to teach English language courses.

== See also ==
- List of universities in Thailand
