= Carol Reed (weather broadcaster) =

American weather broadcaster

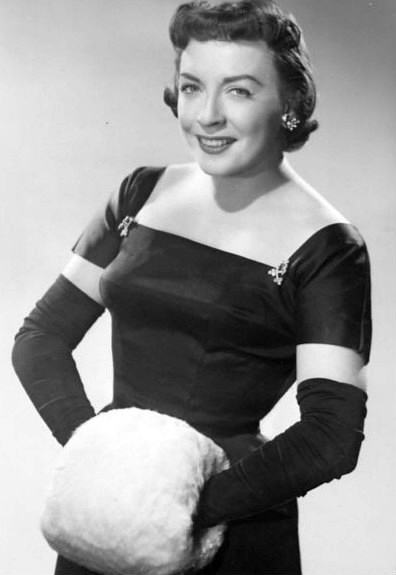
- WCBS-TV photo of Reed.
- Born: 1925 or 1926
- Died: June 4, 1970 (aged 44); Mamaroneck, New York
- Occupation: Weather presenter

Mary Walther O'Hara (1925 or 1926 – June 4, 1970), known professionally as Carol Reed, was an American weather presenter and radio personality. She was the weather presenter for WCBS-TV from 1952 to 1964. Her well received presentation began the trend of women being hired as weather presenters for their appearance. Besides her role as a weather presenter, Reed also hosted a syndicated radio program.

== Personal life ==
Mary Walther was born in Johnson City, New York. She attended the College of Saint Rose before attending the Catholic University of America for a master's degree in speech and drama. She married television sound engineer Hamilton O'Hara.

== Weather presenter ==
Reed began a career in radio and television in 1949. In 1952, she became the weather presenter for WCBS-TV in New York City, hosting the nightly weather segment "Rain or Shine". She was hired purely for her presentation, as she did not have a degree in meteorology and had no prior qualifications for weather reporting. Her hiring was part of an attempt by WCBS-TV to draw viewers from WNBT-TV and its popular weather presenter Tex Antoine. This made her the first female weather presenter in a major American city.

Reed was positively received by viewers, and her distinct delivery became well known among New York residents. Her hiring prompted a trend of female weather presenters being hired for sex appeal rather than for their abilities or expertise, bringing about the term "weather girl". She came to be identified with her nightly sign-off, "have a happy". When asked to explain the phrase, she said that she means it as "whatever you're doing, have it happy". Her program was cut in 1964 when the station decided to fold weather into its standard news reporting.

== Later life ==
Reed would become the commercial spokesperson for Nabisco. She was given her own syndicated radio program, The Carol Reed Show, in which she was an interviewer. She also had a radio show with WCBS, The Talk of New York, in 1966. The same year, she was president of the New York branch of the American Federation of Television and Radio Artists. She served on both the New York board and the national board. Reed received six regional Emmy Award nominations throughout her career, winning one for "most popular female personality". Reed spent her final years working as a master of ceremonies for charity events. She died of cancer on June 4, 1970, in Mamaroneck, New York at age 44.

== Bibliography ==
- Henson, Robert (2013). Weather on the Air: A History of Broadcast Meteorology. American Meteorological Society Boston, MA. doi:10.1007/978-1-935704-00-3. ISBN 978-1-935704-00-3.
