= Post Today =

Defunct Thai newspaper

Post Today (Thai: โพสต์ทูเดย์) was a Thai-language daily newspaper published from 7 February 2003 to 31 March 2019, and operating since then as a news website. It is owned by the Post Publishing Company, best known for their flagship English paper the Bangkok Post. Post Today was positioned as a business daily, competing with other players such as Manager Daily, Krungthep Turakij, Than Sethakij and Prachachat Turakij. It had a readership of 85,000 in 2009.
