= Nation TV (Thai TV channel) =

- Country: Thailand
- Broadcast area: Southeast Asia
- Headquarters: Interlink Tower, Debaratna Road, Bangna, Bangkok, Thailand

Programming
- Language: Thai
- Picture format: 576i SDTV

Ownership
- Owner: Nation TV Co., Ltd. (a subsidiary of Nation Group)
- Sister channels: Spring 26 (2012-2019); Spring News (2015-2019)

History
- Launched: Satellite system: 1 June 2000; 26 years ago Terrestrial digital: 1 April 2014; 12 years ago Satellite and digital: 2 December 2015; 10 years ago
- Former names: Nation Channel (2000-2014)

Links
- Website: www.nationtv.tv

Availability

Terrestrial
- Digital: Channel 22 (TV5 MUX5)

Streaming media
- Official website: Watch live

Nation TV (Thai: เนชั่นทีวี) is the first 24-hour news television channel in Thailand, owned by Nation TV Co., Ltd., a subsidiary of Nation Group.

== History ==
=== Earlier History ===
Nation TV launched in 2000 as Nation Channel (Thai: เนชั่นแชนแนล) on UBC (now TrueVisions) platform on channel 8.

On 1 May 2003, Nation Channel exited UBC and moved to Tai TV (TTV) platform, broadcast via MMDS on channel 1.

=== Digital Terrestrial Television ===
On 27 December 2013, NBC Next Vision won the auction for a digital news channel on channel number 22. On 17 March 2014, the channel name was changed to Nation TV (Thai: เนชั่นทีวี) and updated the logo to be more modern. On 1 April 2014, Nation TV started broadcast on digital terrestrial television via TV5 MUX5.

On 1 January 2015, Nation TV has changed its identity again. It's the letter N in a circle, floating above the letter Nation, which comes from its original identity, but remove the globe. It was also adjusting the aspect ratio to 16:9 like other digital TV stations, but in some cases, for example, the image in the transmission room is still in the same 4:3 aspect ratio until the transmission room of the station is moved to the transmission room at The Coast Lifestyle Mall, Bangna District, Bangkok (Currently discontinued broadcasting at The Coast Bangna and return the space to the operator for rent), as well as purchasing new equipment and broadcasting systems at the main transmission room of the Interlink Tower. Therefore, all Nation TV programs are broadcast in the aspect ratio of 16:9. Later, on January 9, 2020, Nation TV has changed its logo again for modernity with a separate beak added from the upper left corner of the letter N, similar to the number 1.

== Political stance ==
After NMG ownership changed, Nation TV is well-known for Far-Right political coverage and frequently criticized opposition factions such as Future Forward Party.

On 10 November 2020, Nation TV announced a new direction for the station to return to neutral news reports, such as when the station started. After the news team with ideology about dictatorship politics gradually resigned from the station.

== Presenters ==
=== Current ===
- Yukhon Wisaitsung (Nueng)
- Pipoauh Poomkaewkra (Ta)
- Orakarn Jivakiet (Kwang)
- Kittidit Thanaditsuwan (Ping)
- Cholticha Rodgunphai (Nette)
- Satakun Tanthaweeviwat (Nus)
- Teewat Choorat (Yorch)
- Chotima Chankong
- Matchayakorn Meesupprung (Mint)
- Nitchanan Jamduang (Nun)
- Pongpanot Surasettapong (Jimmy)
- Korakit Kasikun (Ko)
- Sinchai Pamonphol (Auan)
- Somchai Meesen (Chang)
- Bakban Boonlert (Oh)
- Weerasak Pongaksorn (Vee)
- Pakorn Puengnetr (Golf)
- Nattaphat Promkaew
- Sakda Samerphop
- Rapeepan Reungsri (Pee)
- Sathaporn Riyapa (Au)
- Warunsuda Karunyathat (Opal)
- Romrumpha Rermroo (Nina)
- Vilasinee Van Haren (Fang)
- Piyawan Prametthawanich (Ploy)
- Sararat Rattanasuwan (Elle)
- Penphan Lamluang (Noi)
- Natsika Gamesaie
- Parnthipa Jittrawuttiporn (Ae)
- Thitichaya Sridokkam
- Kajonchai Phetcharat (Flook)
- Kannika Rungkitcharoenkul (Milk)
- Kosolawat Intuchanyong
- Weerasak Chotiwanich
- Phakkanan Muman (Golf)
- Chib Jitniyom
- Nalin Singhaputtangkul (Lin)
- Atishart Wongwuttiwat (Ong)
- Varavit Chimmanee (George)
- Ratchanon Naowasuwan (Phi)

=== Former ===
- Suthichai Yoon
- Thepchai Yong
- Sontiyan Chuenruetainaidhama (Toi)
- Sorayuth Suthassanachinda (Yuth)
- Monai Yenbutra (Mo)
- Wansiri Siriwan (Jib)
- Krisana Lalai (Aoi)
- Kanok Ratwongsakul (Jing)
- Teera Tanyapaiboon (Hui)
- Santisuk Marongsri (Noom)
- Ancharee Paireerak (Pong)
- Worrathep Suwattanaphim (Ton)
- Kaweepan Montriwong
- Jessada Upani (Jess)
- Kritika Korpaibul (Kuk)
- Wit Sittivaekin (Wit)
- Kulnadda Padchimsawad Anderson (Nina)
- Bancha Kaengkan (Noi)
- Sathapat Paethong (Ball)
- Prajya Aura-ek (Phil)
- Ekaphon Srisuktaveerat (Ake)
- Baramee Navanopparatskul (Yod)
- Bundit Pratumta
- Eakarat Takiannuch (Art)
- Sathaporn Pongpipatwattana
- Satien Viriyapanpongsa
- Gunthap Lertritthisate
- Sarosha Pornudomsak (Am)
- Veenarat Laohapakakul (Pei)
- Phatsurang Dechabuddharungsi (Candy)
- Naya Jaikawang (Aor)
- Nitirath Buachan (Palm)
- Rangsima Sarungkarnnarumit (Krungkring)
- Thanawan Panthachot (Muay)
- Veena Chongprasith
- Ongkotch Wannapak (Ning)
- Nattawut Boontho (Oat)
- Sathaporn Kuasakul (Tha)
- Ubonrat Thaonoi (Mew)
- Worathep Suwattanaphim (Ton)
- Piyaluck Rakpratarnporn (Mu)
- Theppakit Chatsuriyawong (Pik)
- Jomquan Laopetch (Kwan)
- Suphajon Klinsuwan (Tae)
- Wootthinan Nahim (Tob)
- Phat Jintanakun (Pui)
- Suchada Nimnul (Baifern)
- Choengchai Hwangoun
- Chawan Chandradrabya (Game)
- Seri Wongmontha
- Supachok Opasakun (Ton)
- Banjong Cheewamongkolkarn (Jong)
- Umaporn Thamrongwongsopon (Louktarn)
- Angkanang Maimongkol (Aoy)
- Jirayu Chudhabuddhi (Game)
- Jade Prasertrungrueng (Jade)
- Nantakwang Sirasoonthorn (Kieng)
- Phassaphol Tohombutra (Ruj)
- Napat Theeraditthakul (Pat)
- Todsawat Tasuworn (Tom)
- Mookravee Deebukkam (Prim)
- Aekpittaya Iemkongeaek (Aek)
- Kriangsak Phaoindra
- Kom Nopparat
- Tivaporn Thetthit (Kratae)
- Narakorn Tiyayon (Ta)
- Danai Akemahasawad
- Phimpattara Chanhom
- Don Wattanawiboon (Don)
- Orrarin Yamokgul (Orn)
- Patchara Sarnpimpa (Mu)
- Songkarn Archariyasarp
- Thasaneya Rattanawong (Poon)
- Salita Punleuk (Frame) (still working at Nation Group, now at Spring)
- Lalita Mangsoongnoen (Prince)
- Prachatai Thananarong (Berm)
- Sutthirak Uttamontri (Kae)
- Kunjanita Kunjara Na Ayudhya (Prim)
- Chanchai Pratheepwatanawong (Dow)
- Archvin Suksri (Ice)
- Supawan Toh (Jah)

== Identity ==
=== Logos ===
Logo used from 1 January 2015 to 9 January 2020

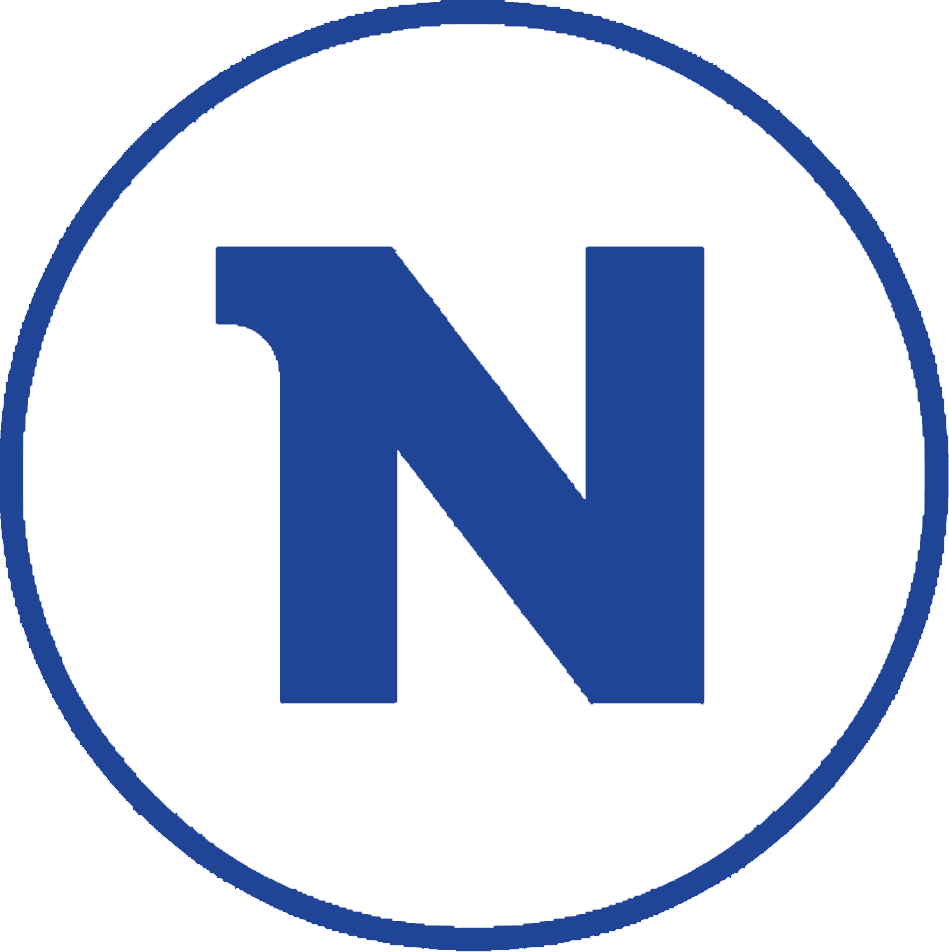
Logo used from 9 January 2020 to February 2025

=== Slogans ===
- 2000-2001: เนชั่นแชนแนล ที่นี่ที่เดียวเท่านั้น (Only Here on Nation Channel) / เนชั่นแชนแนล ตอบทุกคำถามที่คุณอยากรู้ (Nation Channel, Answer All the Questions You Want to Know) / เนชั่นแชนแนล สถานีข่าว 24 ชั่วโมง ที่นี่...แห่งเดียวเท่านั้น (Only Here on Nation Channel, The 24-hour News Station) / เนชั่นแชนแนล ไม่พลาดทุกเหตุการณ์สำคัญ (Nation Channel, Don't Miss Every Important Event) / Nation Channel, All the News, All the Time
- 2001-2003: เนชั่นแชนแนล สถานีข่าว 24 ชั่วโมง แห่งแรกของคนไทย (Nation Channel, The First 24-hour News Station for Thai People)
- 2012-2014: เนชั่นแชนแนล ในสนามข่าว "เรา" คือตัวจริง (Nation Channel, In the News Arena, We Are the Real)
- 2014-present: เนชั่นทีวี ทุกสนามข่าว "เรา" คือตัวจริง (Nation TV, Every News Arena, We Are the Real)
- 2018-present: ดูเนชั่น กด 22 (Watch Nation, Press Channel Number 22)
- 2020: ทันทุกข่าวไปพร้อมกับเรา (Catch-Up Every News Along with Us)
- 2020-2022: ชัดทุกเนื้อหา รอบด้านทุกการนำเสนอ (Clear All Quality, Move All Around the Presentation)
- 2026-present: Nation TV ผู้นำข่าวสารเพื่อการตัดสินใจ (Nation TV: Leading news provider for informed decision-making)
