= Nation Group =

Media company in Thailand

Nation Group (Thailand) PCL
- Type: Public
- Traded as: SET: NATION
- Industry: Media and publishing
- Founded: 1 July 1971 (55 years ago)
- Headquarters: 1858/118–119, 121–122, 124–130, Interlink Tower 27th-32nd Fl, Bangna-Trad Rd, Bang Na, Bangkok, Thailand
- Key people: Ms Duangkamol Chotana (CEO)
- Revenue: ▲3.2 billion baht (2015)
- Net income: ▼35.6 million baht (2015)
- Total assets: ▼8.2 billion baht (2015)
- Total equity: ▲3.9 billion baht (2015)
- Owner: News Network Corporation PCL
- Website: www.nationgroup.com

Nation Group (Thailand) Public Company Limited (NATION) (Thai: บริษัท เนชั่น กรุ๊ป (ไทยแลนด์) จำกัด (มหาชน)) is one of Thailand's largest media companies. The company operates two digital television stations, three national newspapers (English, Thai business, and Thai mass circulation), a university, a book and cartoon unit, printing and logistics operations, and new media and digital platforms. Its symbol on the Stock Exchange of Thailand (SET) is "NATION".

== History ==
Nation Group was founded on 1 July 1971 by a group of Thai journalists with the launch of The Voice of the Nation, an English-language newspaper. It was later renamed The Nation with the motto "Thailand's Independent Newspaper". The company later expanded into Thai business newspaper publishing and television media, both of which are number one in their respective news categories in Thailand. Nation Group is a founding member of Asia News Network, an alliance of 21 media in 19 Asian countries.

In January 2018, the Nation Multimedia Group, in a hostile acquisition, was taken over by Sontiyan Chuenruetainaidhama, founder of conservative outlets T News and INN News.

=== Significant developments ===
- 1971: Nation Group founded to publish the country's first Thai-owned and managed English newspaper.
- 1976: Business Review Co established to publish The Nation Review newspaper, forerunner of The Nation.
- 1987: Krungthep Turakij launched as a daily Thai-language business newspaper.
- 1988: Company renamed "Nation Publishing Group Co Ltd" in preparation for listing on the Stock Exchange of Thailand (SET).
- 1990: License received to locally print and distribute The Asian Wall Street Journal and Yomiuri Shimbun.
- 1992: Nation Radio established and two new publications launched, Nation Weekender and Nation Junior.
- 1996: Company renamed "Nation Multimedia Group Public Company Limited".
- 2000: Nation Channel, Thailand's first 24-hour news television station began broadcasts.
- 2001: Kom Chad Luek launched as a daily Thai-language mass-circulation newspaper.
- 2002: Nation Books established to support rising demand in the paperback industry.
- 2005: WPS (Thailand) Co Ltd established to handle the printing business.
- 2006: Kyodo Nation Printing Services Co Ltd launched to provide commercial printing services.
- 2011: Nation U Co Ltd established to operate Nation University.
- 2013: Licenses received to operate two digital television channels, "NOW 26" and "Nation TV".
- 2019: Paper issues of the English-language daily The Nation will be discontinued, replaced by an online edition. The last paper copy will be the 28 June edition.
- 2020: There was a consumer activism campaign against sponsors of Nation Multimedia Group during the 2020 Thai protests due to the former's "pro-establishment bias".
- 2022: Company renamed "Nation Group (Thailand) Public Company Limited"

== Organization ==
The Nation Group operates eight business units:

- Thai-language Business News Unit, Krungthep Media Company Limited (KTM)
- General Thai News Business Unit, Kom Chad Luek Media Company Limited (KMM)
- English News Business Unit, Nation News Network Company Limited (NNN)
- Digital TV Business Unit

- Spring 26 Digital TV Channel: Spring 26 Company Limited
- Nation TV 22: Nation TV Company Limited (NTV)

- Edutainment and International Business Business Unit, Nation International Edutainment PLC.
- Printing Business Unit, WPS (Thailand) Company Limited (WPS)
- Logistics Business Unit, NML Co., Ltd.
- Education Business Unit, Nation U Co., Ltd.

=== Publications ===
The Nation Multimedia Group publishes the following:

- Krungthep Thurakij (Bangkok Business News): A daily Thai-language business newspaper with circulation in the 80,000-100,000 range. This paper is also popular with Thai intellectuals. Its political stance is progressive.
- Kom Chad Luek (Sharp, Clear, Deep): A mass-circulation, Thai-language daily, with circulation in the 500,000-600,000 range. It was launched in 2001.
- The Nation: An English-language daily with circulation in the 60,000-80,000 range. Maintains a progressive editorial line.
- NJ Digital: A youth-targeted multimedia English learning.
- Nation Weekend: A weekly Thai-language news magazine.

== See also ==
- Media in Thailand
