= Bodycote =

Engineering services company

Bodycote plc
- Formerly: Bodycote International p l c (1953–2008)
- Type: Public
- Traded as: LSE: BOY; FTSE 250 component
- Industry: Engineering Services
- Founded: 1923
- Headquarters: Macclesfield, Cheshire, United Kingdom
- Key people: Daniel Dayan (Chairman); Jim Fairbairn (CEO)
- Revenue: ▼£727.1 million (2025)
- Operating income: ▲£83.6 million (2025)
- Net income: ▲£55.4 million (2025)
- Number of employees: 5,000 (2025)
- Website: bodycote.com

Bodycote plc is a supplier of heat treatments, metal joining, hot isostatic pressing and coating services. Based in Macclesfield, United Kingdom, it is listed on the London Stock Exchange and is a constituent of the FTSE 250 Index.

== History ==
The Company was founded by Arthur Bodycote in Hinckley in 1923 as a textile business under the name of G.R. Bodycote Ltd. It was acquired by Slater Walker in 1969 and demerged from them in 1972. The company was listed on the London Stock Exchange on 28 January 1972.

It refocused on its present activities in the 1970s, particularly in bullet-proof and flame retardant clothing in the specialist materials sector. From 1979 onwards, it made a series of acquisitions, the first of which was Blandburgh, a heat treatment business. In 1980, it went on to buy Zinc Alloy Rust Proofing Ltd, which was the beginning of its metallurgical coatings business.

In 1990, Bodycote acquired Metallurgical Testing Services Ltd (MTS) of Edinburgh from Murray International plc, laying the foundations for what would become Bodycote's materials testing business. In 2008, the materials testing division was sold to private ownership, leading to the founding of the testing company Exova. In 1991, it bought HIP Ltd, a leading Hot Isostatic Processing business.

In December 2000, the company bought Lindberg Corporation, the largest heat treatment business in the United States. In April 2006, Warrington Fire acquired by Bodycote and integrated into its materials testing and engineering & technology division.

In April 2008, the company changed its name from Bodycote International plc to Bodycote plc. The company was negatively impacted by the wider economic consequences of the Great Recession, possessing high fixed costs amid weakness in both the aerospace and gas markets, and issuing a profit warning in July 2009. By July 2010, Bodycote's share price had doubled over the previous two years, in part due to a large cost-cutting exercise and sound balance sheet.

In 2018, Bodycote signed a 15-year contract to provide thermal processing services for Rolls-Royce’s civil aerospace business with a forecast value for £160 million. Two years later, it opened a new heat treatment facility in Illinois, US.

In July 2024, the company recorded a 53 percent decline in first-half profits that was attributed to the curtailed implementation of an enterprise resource planning system; around this time, the company's performance in both the aerospace and defence sectors organically grew by 15 percent while its automotive and general industrial activities underperformed. During the mid 2020s, Bodycote underwent reorganisation, which included the sale of 10 of its French-based locations, closing eight other sites, and orienting towards the US aerospace market and its Specialist Technologies division, which has been credited with achieving above-average margins for the company. To this end, in early 2025, the firm incurred a series of one-off goodwill write-downs, restructuring costs, and a tech-related impairment. That same year, Bodycote formed a strategic collaboration with the Swedish nuclear specialist Blykalla to produce reactor components.

In June 2026, after holding discussions with Bodycote over a prospective £1.52 billion takeover, the private equity firm Apollo Global Management announced that it did not intend to issue a firm takeover bid for the firm. In early August 2026, Bodycote's board of directors received two separate bids, each valued at £1.6 billion, from the private equity companies CVC Capital Partners and Veritas Capital to takeover ownership of the firm. In September 2026, the board agreed to accept an offer worth $2.5 billion from Veritas Capital.

== Operations ==
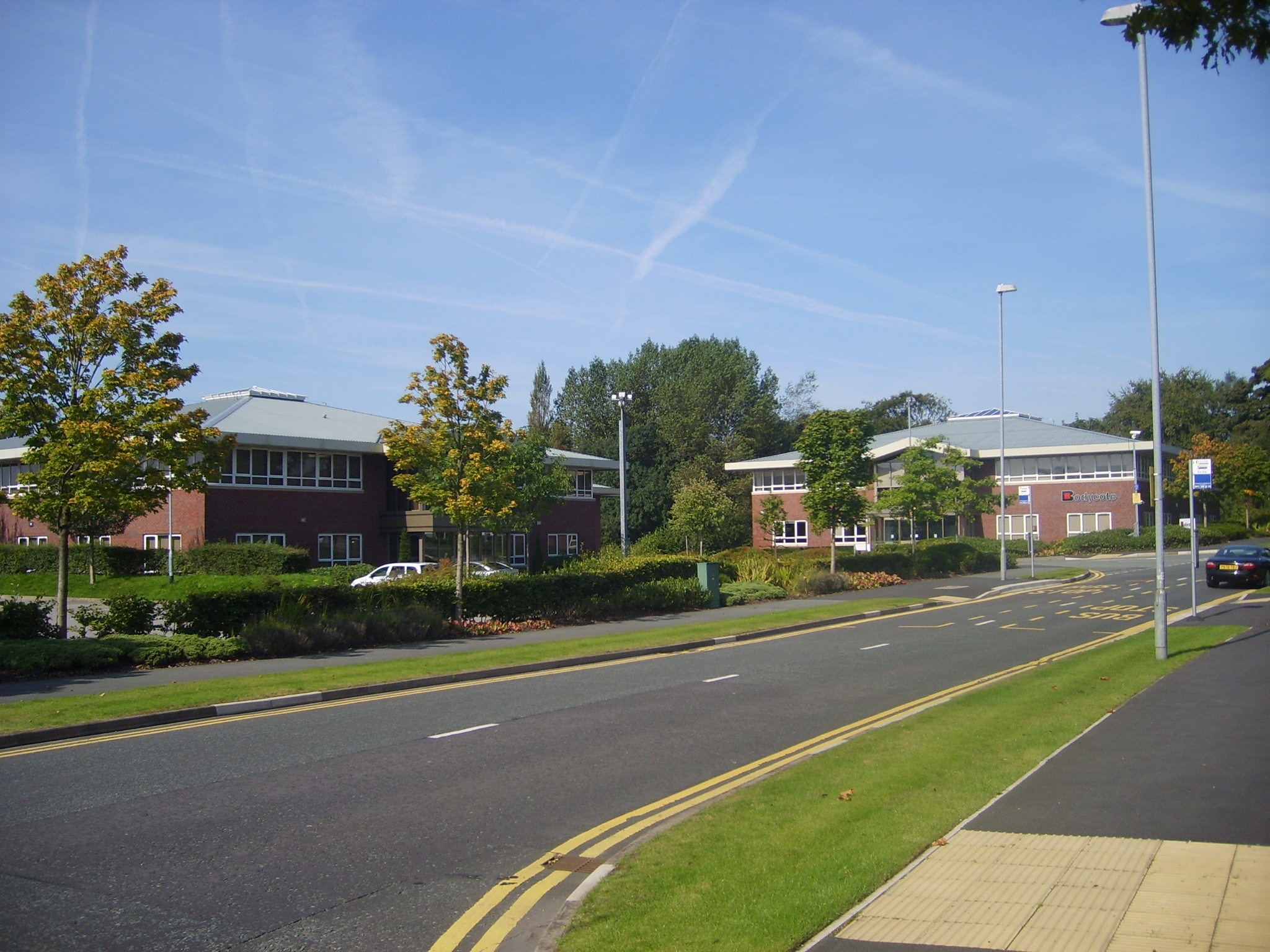
Bodycote's head office at Tytherington Business Park in Macclesfield

The Company has two divisions:

- The Aerospace, Defence & Energy (ADE) business division serves the aerospace, defence, power generation and oil and gas industries.
- The Automotive & General Industrial (AGI) business division serves the automotive, construction, machine building, medical and transportation industries.
