= Airplane =

Powered aircraft with wings

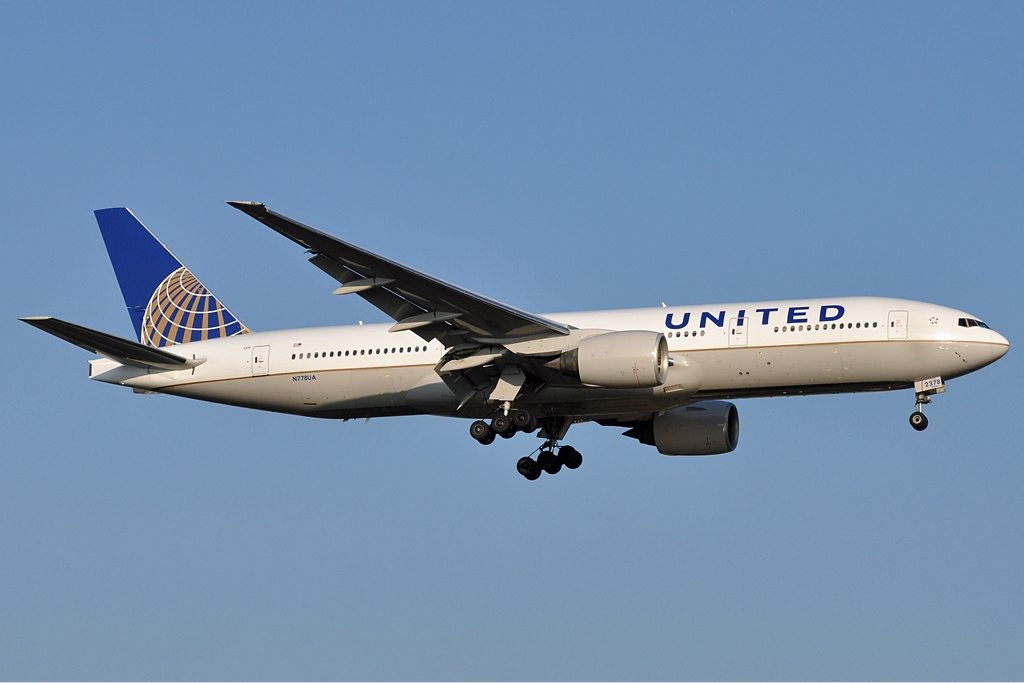
- A United Airlines Boeing 777-200 on approach to land
- Classification: Vehicle
- Industry: Various
- Application: Transportation
- Fuel source: Gasoline, electricity, diesel, natural gas, hydrogen, solar
- Powered: Yes
- Self-propelled: Depends on model
- Inventor: Orville Wright; Wilbur Wright
- Invented: 1903; 123 years ago

An airplane (American English), or aeroplane (Commonwealth English), also plane, is a fixed-wing aircraft that is propelled forward by thrust from a jet engine, propeller, or rocket engine. Airplanes come in a variety of sizes, shapes, and wing configurations. The broad spectrum of uses for airplanes includes recreation, transportation of goods and people, military, and research.

Worldwide, commercial aviation transports more than four billion passengers annually on airliners and transports more than 200 billion tonne-kilometers of cargo annually, which is less than 1% of the world's cargo movement. Most airplanes are flown by a pilot on board the aircraft, but some are designed to be remotely or computer-controlled, such as drones.

Otto Lilienthal's glider flights in the 1890s are seen as the beginning of fixed-wing flight. In 1903 the Wright brothers invented and flew the Wright Flyer, recognized as "the first sustained and controlled heavier-than-air powered flight". The Wrights learned from the work of Lilienthal and George Cayley, who set forth the modern concept of the airplane in 1799 and later built and flew models and successful passenger-carrying gliders. Alberto Santos-Dumont made the first public airplane flights in Europe in 1906, accelerating enthusiasm for practical winged flight.

The first jet aircraft was the German Heinkel He 178 in 1939. The first jet airliner, the de Havilland Comet, was introduced in 1952. The Boeing 707, the first widely successful commercial jet, was in commercial service for more than 60 years, from 1958 to 2019.

== Etymology and usage ==
First attested in English in the late 19th century (prior to the first sustained powered flight), the word airplane, like aeroplane, derives from the French aéroplane, which comes from the Greek ἀήρ (aēr), "air" and either Latin planus, "level", or Greek πλάνος (planos), "wandering". "Aéroplane" originally referred just to the wing, as it is a plane moving through the air. In an example of synecdoche, the word for the wing came to refer to the entire aircraft.

In the United States and Canada, the term "airplane" is used for powered fixed-wing aircraft. In the United Kingdom and Ireland, and most of the Commonwealth, the term "aeroplane" (/ˈɛərəpleɪn/) is usually applied to these aircraft. According to the Oxford English Dictionary, "Airplane became the standard U.S. term (replacing aeroplane) after it was adopted by the National Advisory Committee for Aeronautics in 1916."

== History ==
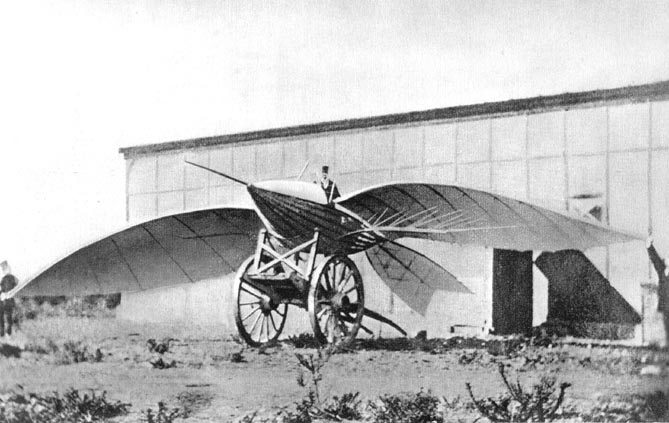
Le Bris and his glider, Albatros II, photographed by Nadar, 1868

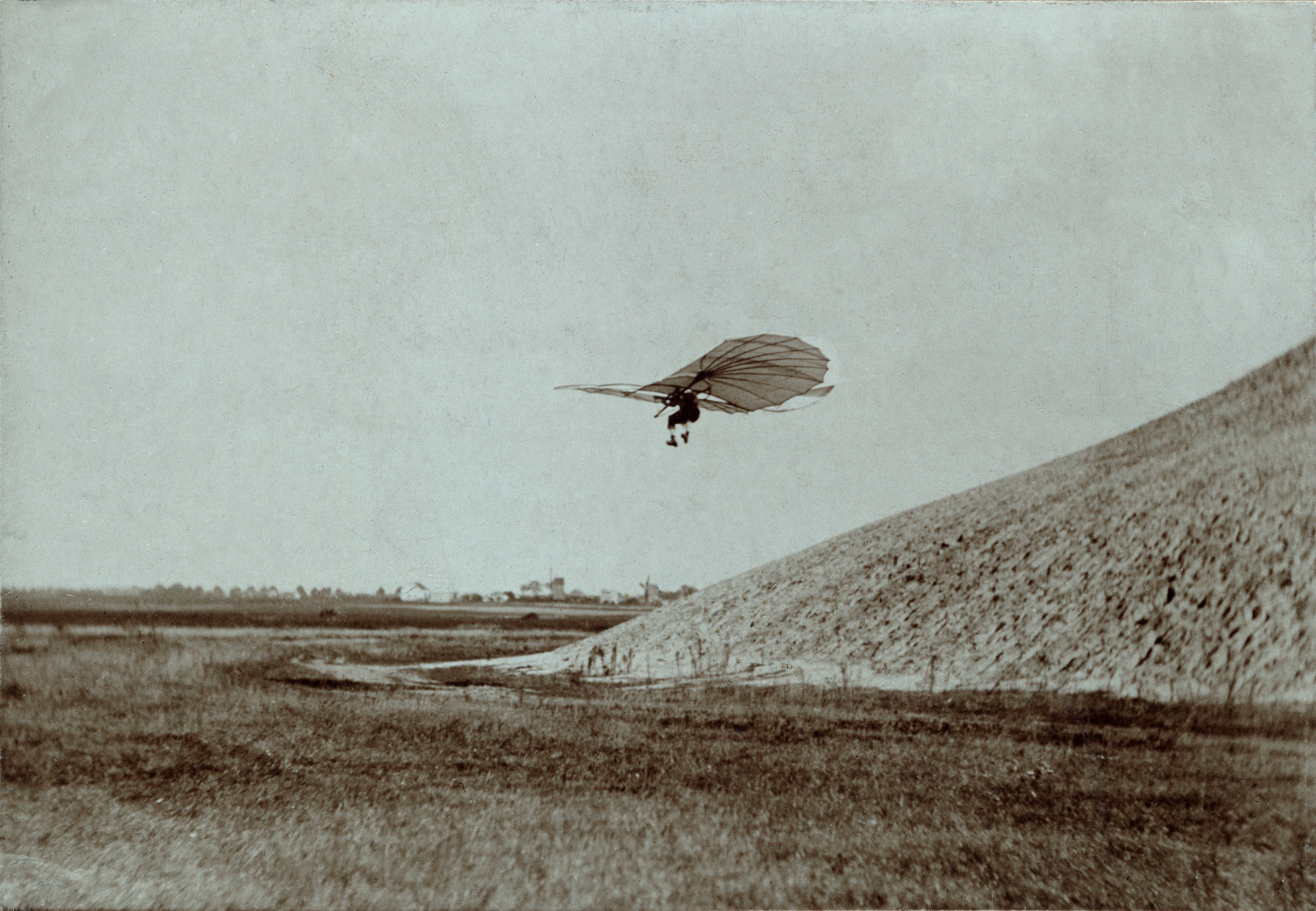
Otto Lilienthal in mid-flight, Berlin, c. 1895

=== Antecedents ===
Many stories from antiquity involve flight, such as the Greek legend of Icarus and Daedalus, and the Vimana in ancient Indian epics. Around 400 BC in Greece, Archytas was reputed to have designed and built the first artificial, self-propelled flying device, a bird-shaped model propelled by a jet of what was probably steam, said to have flown some 200 m (660 ft). This machine may have been suspended for its flight.

Some of the earliest recorded attempts with gliders were those by the 9th-century Andalusian and Arabic-language poet Abbas ibn Firnas and the 11th-century English monk Eilmer of Malmesbury; both experiments injured their pilots. Leonardo da Vinci researched the wing design of birds and designed a man-powered aircraft in his Codex on the Flight of Birds (1502), noting for the first time the distinction between the center of mass and the center of pressure of flying birds.

In 1799, George Cayley set forth the concept of the modern airplane as a fixed-wing flying machine with separate systems for lift, propulsion, and control. Cayley was building and flying models of fixed-wing aircraft as early as 1803, and he built a successful passenger-carrying glider in 1853. In 1856, Frenchman Jean-Marie Le Bris made the first powered flight, by having his glider "L'Albatros artificiel" pulled by a horse on a beach. Then the Russian Alexander F. Mozhaisky also made some innovative designs. In 1883, the American John J. Montgomery made a controlled flight in a glider. Other aviators who made similar flights at that time were Otto Lilienthal, Percy Pilcher, and Octave Chanute.

Sir Hiram Maxim built a craft that weighed 3.5 tons, with a 110-foot (34 m) wingspan that was powered by two 360-horsepower (270 kW) steam engines driving two propellers. In 1894, his machine was tested with overhead rails to prevent it from rising. The test showed that it had enough lift to take off. Due to the aircraft's instability, Maxim subsequently abandoned the project.

Between 1867 and 1896, the German pioneer of human aviation Otto Lilienthal developed heavier-than-air flight. He was the first person to make well-documented, repeated, successful gliding flights. Lilienthal's work led to him developing the concept of the modern wing, his flight attempts in 1891 are seen as the beginning of human flight, the "Lilienthal Normalsegelapparat" is considered to be the first airplane in series production and his work heavily inspired the Wright brothers.

In the 1890s, Lawrence Hargrave conducted research on wing structures and developed a box kite that lifted the weight of a man. His box kite designs were widely adopted. Although he also developed a type of rotary aircraft engine, he did not create and fly a powered fixed-wing aircraft.

=== Early powered flights ===
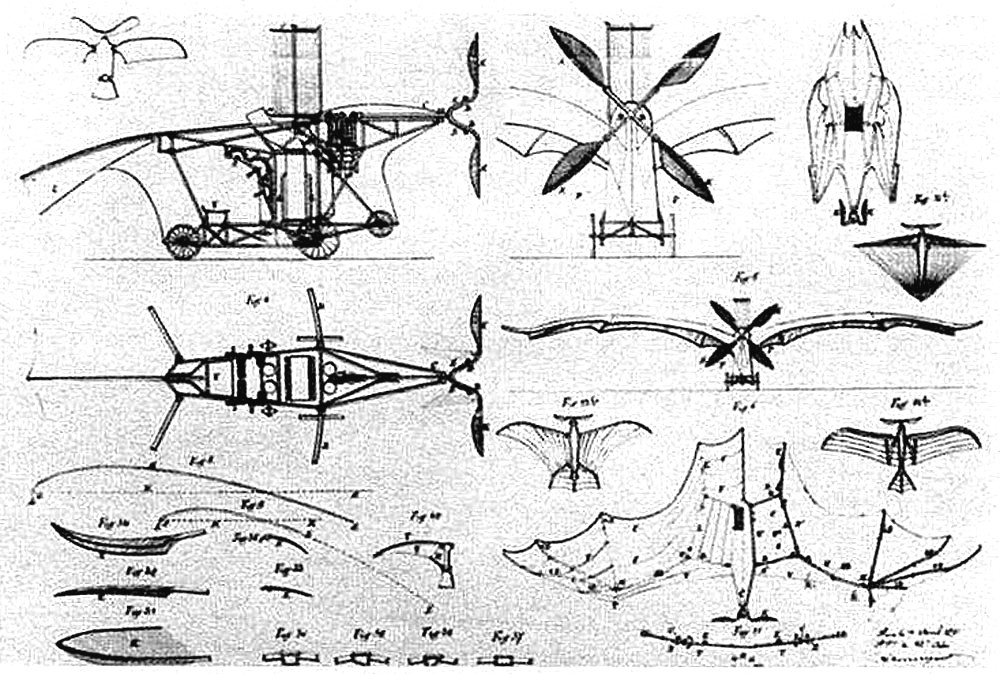
Patent drawings of Clement Ader's Éole.

The Frenchman Clement Ader constructed his first of three flying machines in 1886, the Éole. It was a bat-like design run by a lightweight steam engine of his own invention, with four cylinders developing 20 horsepower (15 kW), driving a four-blade propeller. The engine weighed no more than 4 kilograms per kilowatt (6.6 lb/hp). The wings had a span of 14 m (46 ft). All-up weight was 300 kilograms (660 lb). On 9 October 1890, Ader attempted to fly the Éole. Aviation historians give credit to this effort as a powered take-off and uncontrolled hop of approximately 50 m (160 ft) at a height of approximately 200 mm (7.9 in). Ader's two subsequent machines were not documented to have achieved flight.

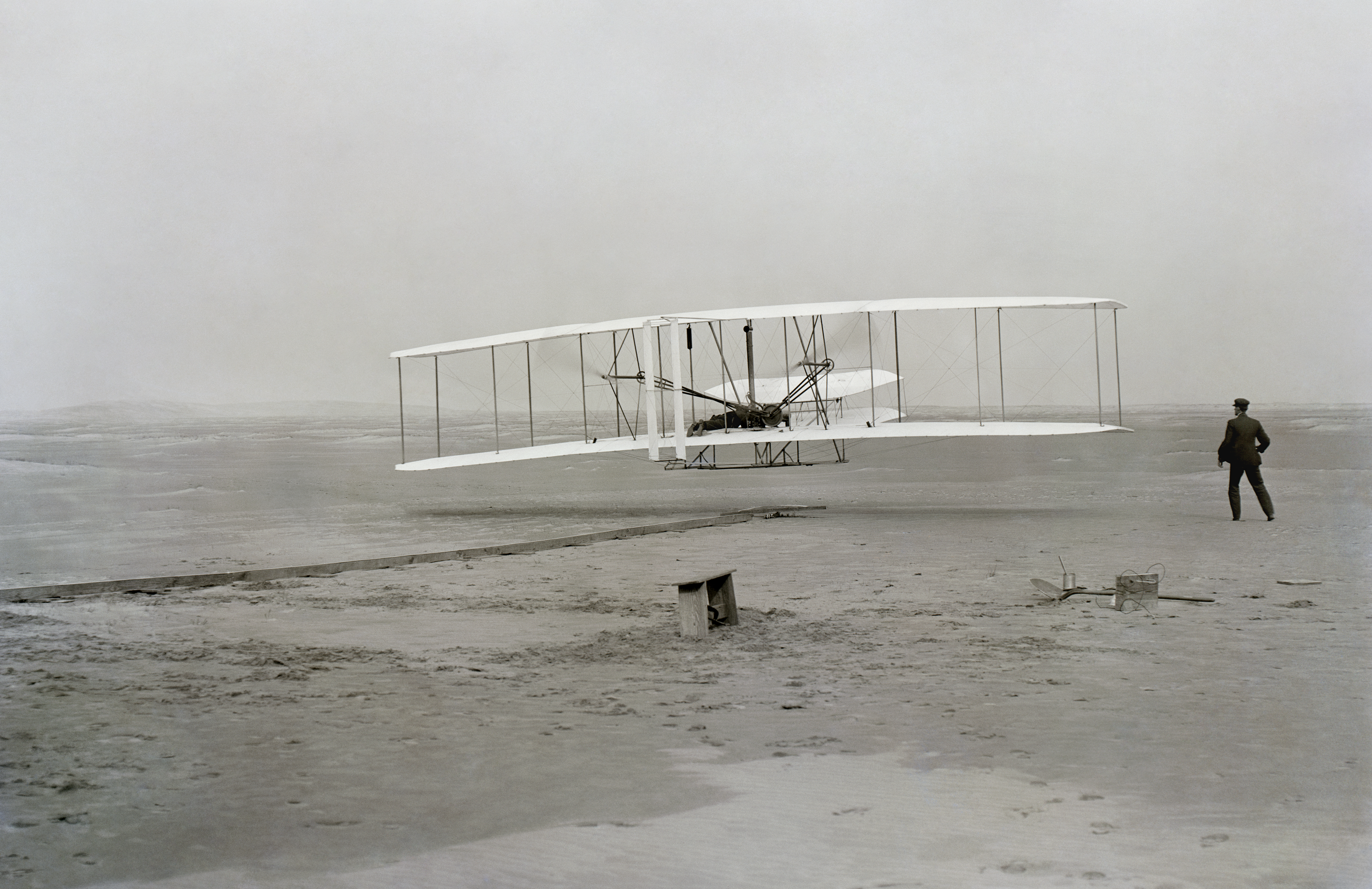
The Wright Flyer's first flight on 17 December 1903

The American Wright brothers's flights in 1903 are recognized by the Fédération Aéronautique Internationale (FAI), the standard-setting and record-keeping body for aeronautics, as "the first sustained and controlled heavier-than-air powered flight". By 1905, the Wright Flyer III was capable of fully controllable, stable flight for substantial periods. The Wright brothers credited Otto Lilienthal as a major inspiration for their decision to pursue manned flight.

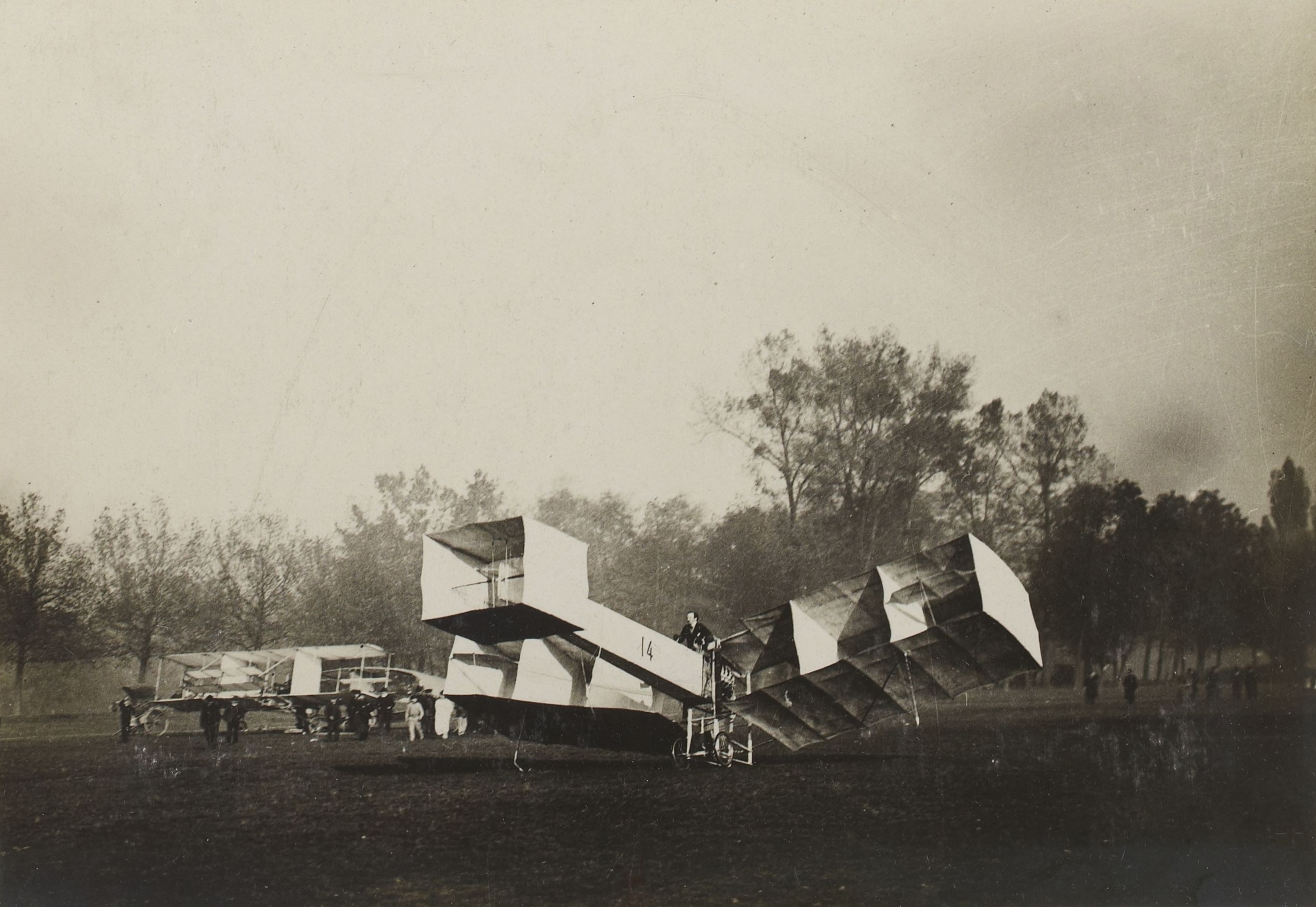
Santos-Dumont 14-bis, between 1906 and 1907

In 1906, the Brazilian Alberto Santos-Dumont made what was claimed to be the first airplane flight unassisted by catapult and set the first world record recognized by the Aéro-Club de France by flying 220 meters (720 ft) in less than 22 seconds. This flight was also certified by the FAI.

An early aircraft design that brought together the modern monoplane tractor configuration was the Blériot VIII design of 1908. It had movable tail surfaces controlling both yaw and pitch, a form of roll control supplied either by wing warping or by ailerons and controlled by its pilot with a joystick and rudder bar. It was an important predecessor of his later Blériot XI Channel-crossing aircraft of the summer of 1909.

World War I served as a testbed for the use of the airplane as a weapon. Airplanes demonstrated their potential as mobile observation platforms, then proved themselves to be machines of war capable of causing casualties to the enemy. The earliest known aerial victory with a synchronized machine gun-armed fighter aircraft occurred in 1915, by German Luftstreitkräfte Leutnant Kurt Wintgens. Fighter aces appeared; the greatest (by number of Aerial Combat victories) was Manfred von Richthofen, also known as the Red Baron.

Following WWI, aircraft technology continued to develop. Alcock and Brown crossed the Atlantic non-stop for the first time in 1919. The first international commercial flights took place between the United States and Canada in 1919.

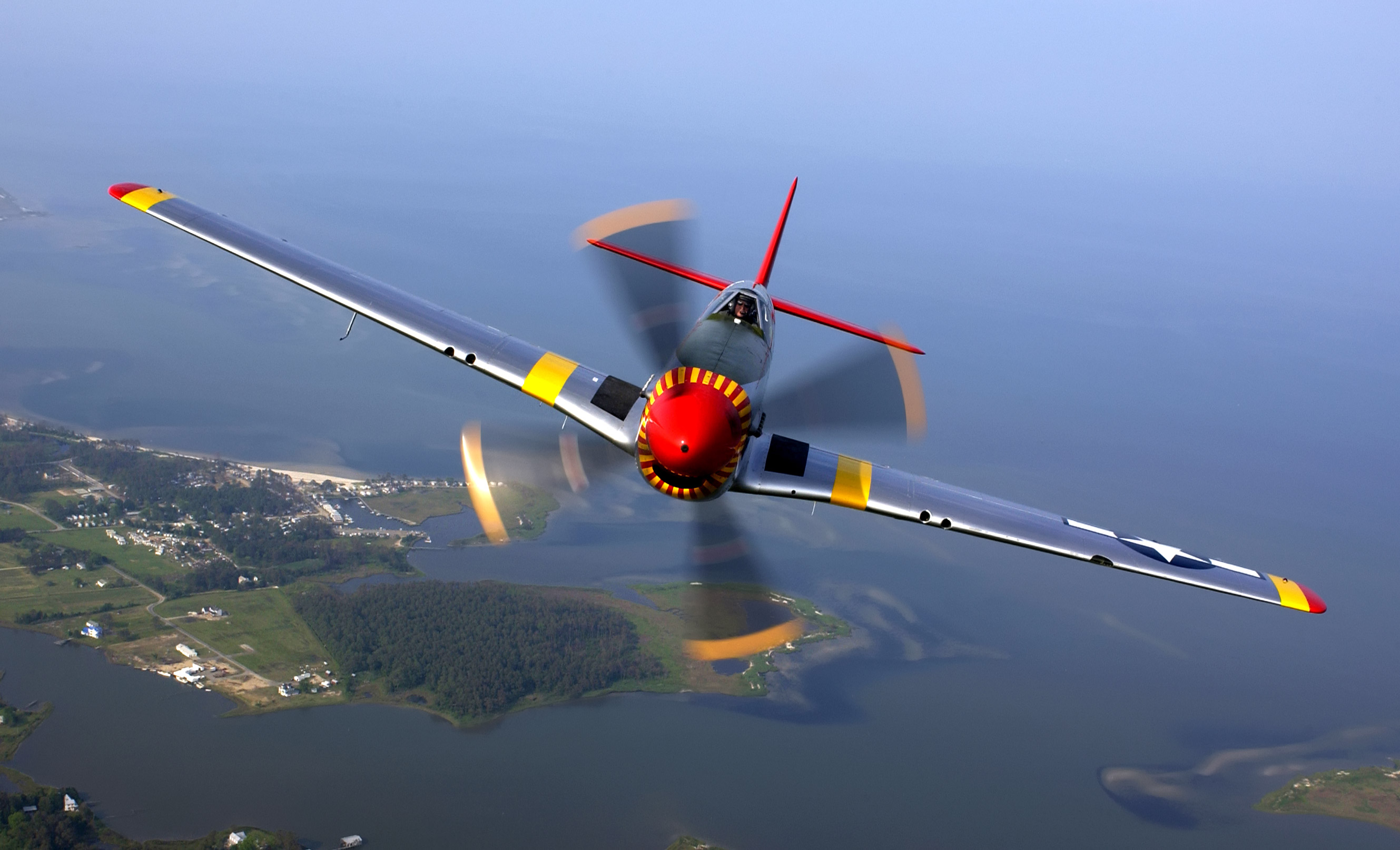
North American P-51 Mustang, a World War II fighter aircraft

Airplanes had a presence in all the major battles of World War II. They were an essential component of the military strategies of the period, such as the German Blitzkrieg, The Battle of Britain, and the American and Japanese aircraft carrier campaigns of the Pacific War.

=== Development of jet aircraft ===
The first practical jet aircraft was the German Heinkel He 178, which was tested in 1939. In 1943, the Messerschmitt Me 262, the first operational jet fighter aircraft, went into service in the German Luftwaffe.

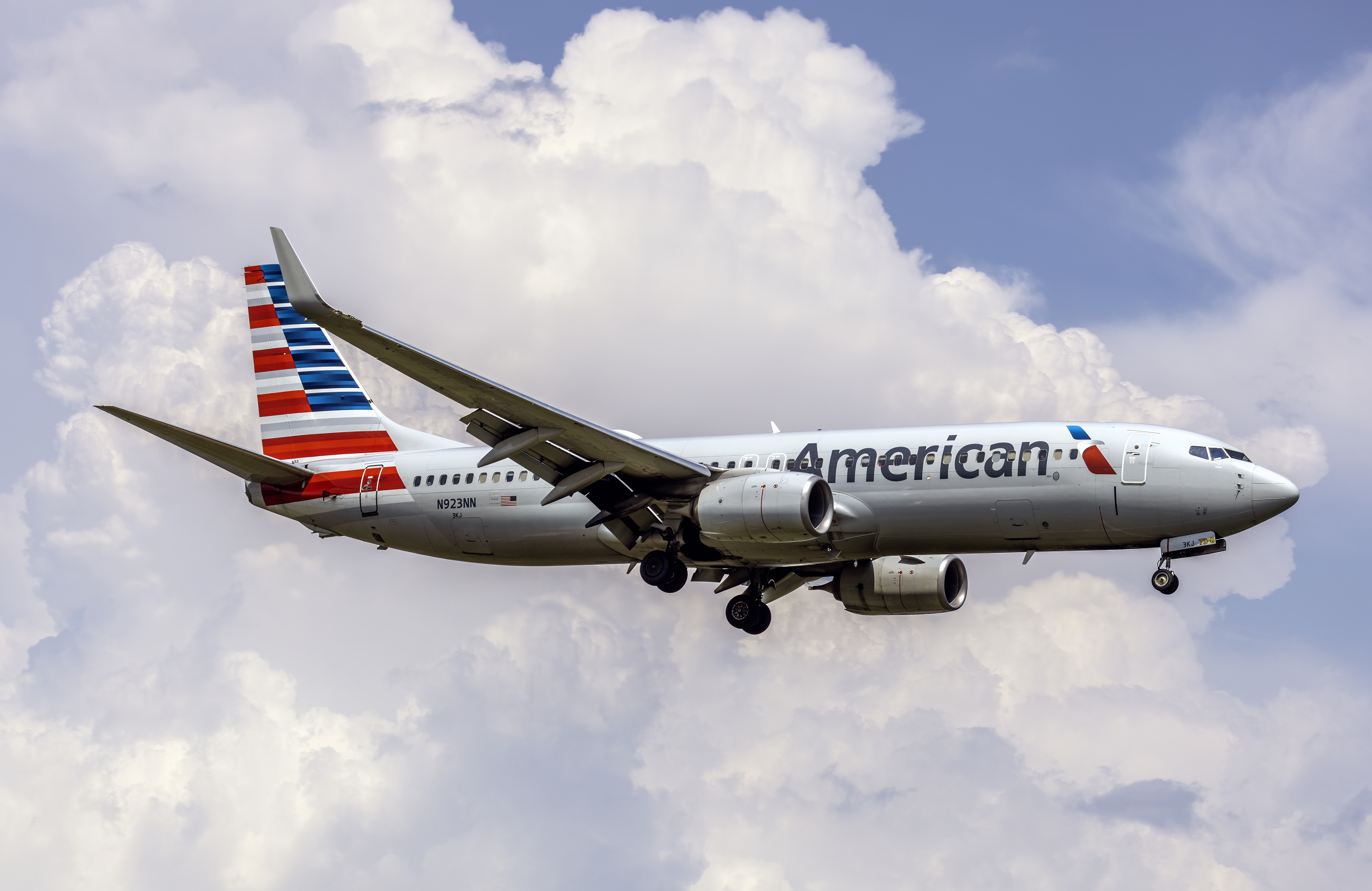
An American Airlines Boeing 737-800 landing at Ronald Reagan Washington National Airport in July 2024

The first jet airliner, the de Havilland Comet, was introduced in 1952. The Boeing 707, the first widely successful commercial jet, was in commercial service for more than 50 years, from 1958 to 2010. The Boeing 747 was the world's biggest passenger aircraft from 1970 until it was surpassed by the Airbus A380 in 2005.

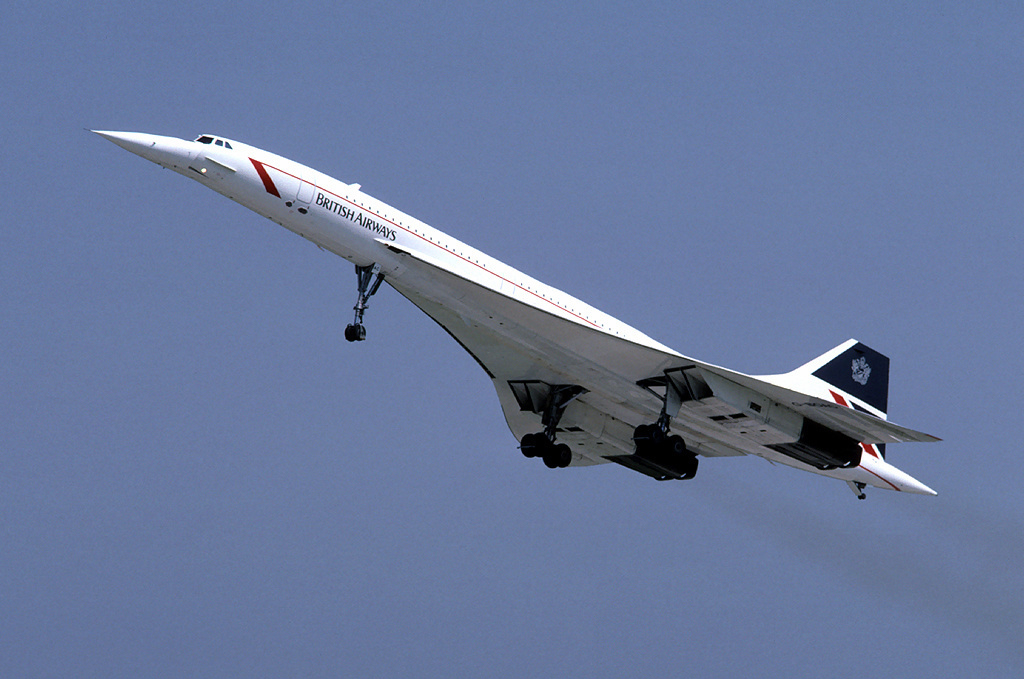
The Concorde supersonic transport aircraft

Supersonic airliner flights, including those of the Concorde, have been limited to over-water flight at supersonic speed because of their sonic boom, which is prohibited over most populated land areas. The high cost of operation per passenger-mile and a deadly crash in 2000 induced the operators of the Concorde to remove it from service.

== Propulsion ==
=== Propeller ===
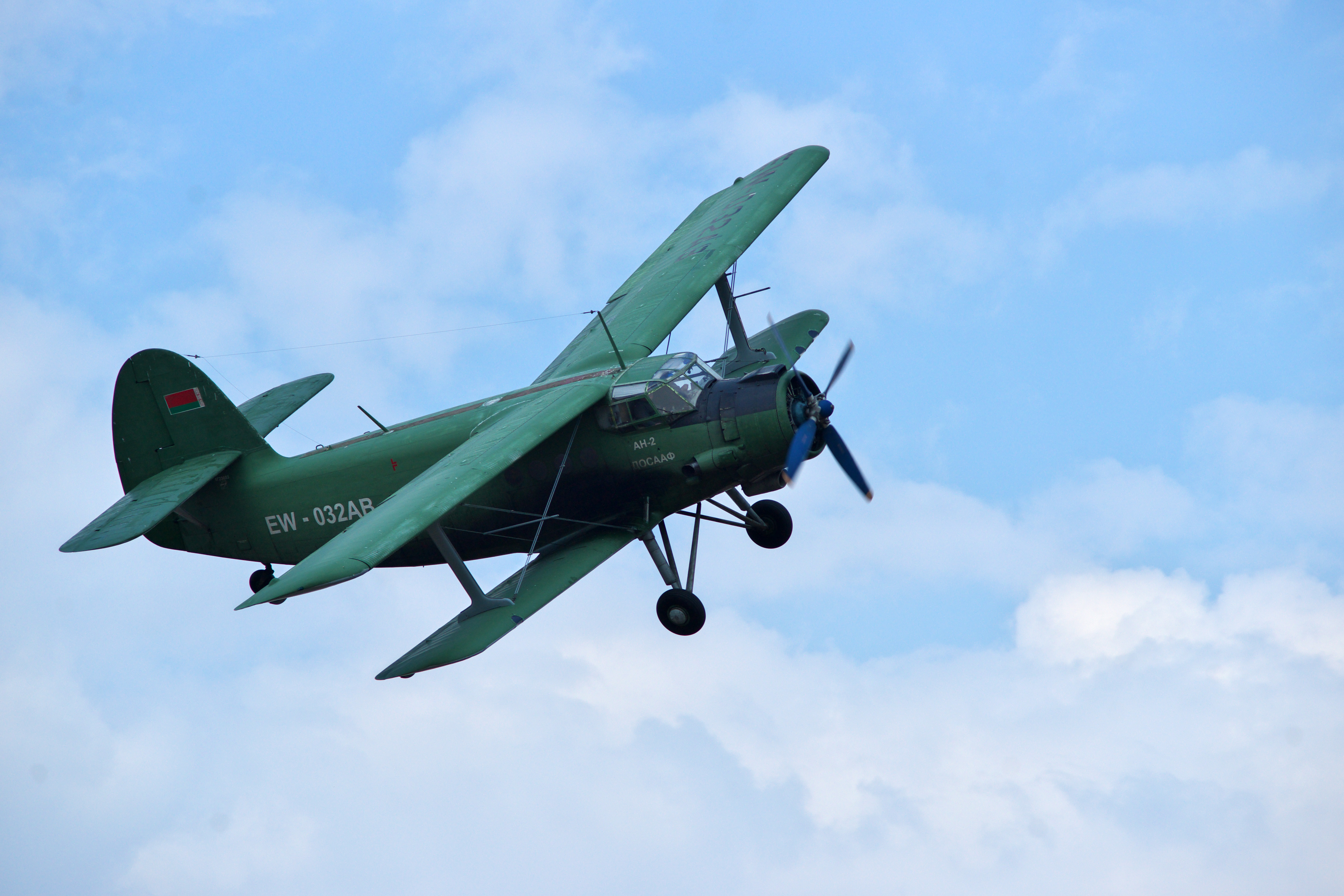
An Antonov An-2 biplane

An aircraft propeller, or airscrew, converts rotary motion from an engine or other power source, into a swirling slipstream which pushes the propeller forwards or backwards. It comprises a rotating power-driven hub, to which are attached two or more radial airfoil-section blades such that the whole assembly rotates about a longitudinal axis. Three types of aviation engines used to power propellers include reciprocating engines (or piston engines), gas turbines, and electric motors. The amount of thrust a propeller creates is determined, in part, by its disk area—the area through which the blades rotate. The limitation on blade speed is the speed of sound; as when the blade tip exceeds the speed of sound, shock waves decrease propeller efficiency. The rpm required to generate a given tip speed is inversely proportional to the diameter of the propeller. The upper design speed limit for propeller-driven aircraft is Mach 0.6. Aircraft designed to go faster than that employ jet engines.

==== Reciprocating engine ====
Reciprocating engines in aircraft have three main variants, radial, in-line and flat or horizontally opposed engine. The radial engine is a reciprocating type internal combustion engine configuration in which the cylinders "radiate" outward from a central crankcase like the spokes of a wheel and was commonly used for aircraft engines before gas turbine engines became predominant. An inline engine is a reciprocating engine with banks of cylinders, one behind another, rather than rows of cylinders, with each bank having any number of cylinders, but rarely more than six, and may be water-cooled. A flat engine is an internal combustion engine with horizontally opposed cylinders.

==== Gas turbine ====
A turboprop gas turbine engine consists of an intake, compressor, combustor, turbine, and a propelling nozzle, which provide power from a shaft through a reduction gearing to the propeller. The propelling nozzle provides a relatively small proportion of the thrust generated by a turboprop.

==== Electric motor ====
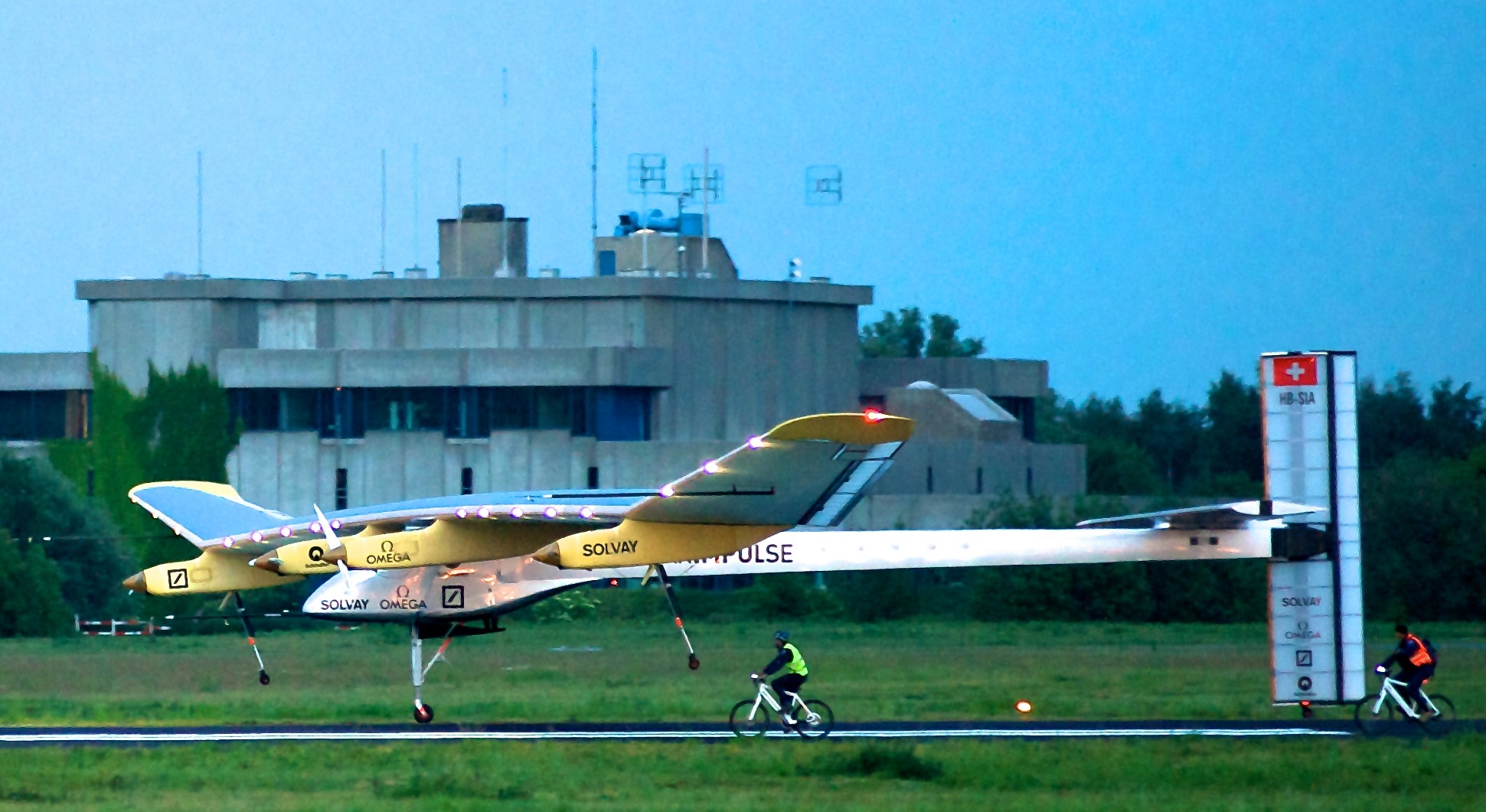
Solar Impulse 1, a solar-powered aircraft with electric motors.

An electric aircraft runs on electric motors with electricity coming from fuel cells, solar cells, ultracapacitors, power beaming, or batteries. Currently, flying electric aircraft are mostly experimental prototypes, including manned and unmanned aerial vehicles, but there are some production models on the market.

=== Jet ===
Jet aircraft are propelled by jet engines, which are used because the aerodynamic limitations of propellers do not apply to jet propulsion. These engines are much more powerful than a reciprocating engine for a given size or weight and are comparatively quiet and work well at higher altitude. Variants of the jet engine include the ramjet and the scramjet, which rely on high airspeed and intake geometry to compress the combustion air, prior to the introduction and ignition of fuel. Rocket motors provide thrust by burning a fuel with an oxidizer and expelling gas through a nozzle.

==== Turbofan ====
Most jet aircraft use turbofan jet engines, which employ a gas turbine to drive a ducted fan, which accelerates air around the turbine to provide thrust in addition to that which is accelerated through the turbine. The ratio of air passing around the turbine to that passing through is called the by-pass ratio. They represent a compromise between turbojet (with no bypass) and turboprop forms of aircraft propulsion (primarily powered with bypass air).

Subsonic aircraft, such as airliners, employ high by-pass jet engines for fuel efficiency. Supersonic aircraft, such as jet fighters, use low-bypass turbofans. However at supersonic speeds, the air entering the engine must be decelerated to a subsonic speed and then re-accelerated back to supersonic speeds after combustion. An afterburner may be used on combat aircraft to increase power for short periods of time by injecting fuel directly into the hot exhaust gases. Many jet aircraft also use thrust reversers to slow down after landing.

==== Ramjet ====
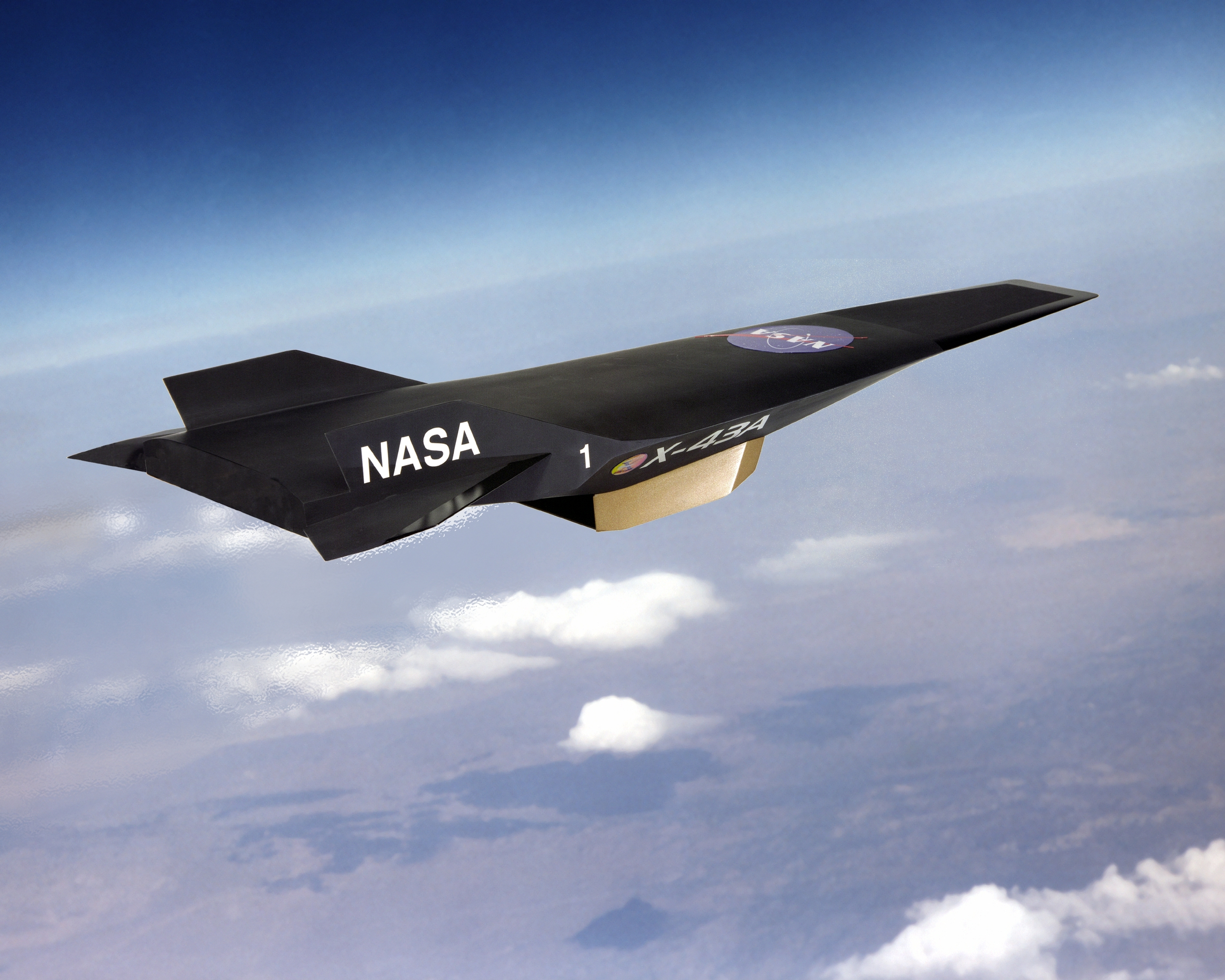
Artist's concept of X-43A with scramjet attached to the underside

A ramjet is a form of jet engine that contains no major moving parts and can be particularly useful in applications requiring a small and simple engine for high-speed use, such as with missiles. Ramjets require forward motion before they can generate thrust and so are often used in conjunction with other forms of propulsion, or with an external means of achieving sufficient speed. The Lockheed D-21 was a Mach 3+ ramjet-powered reconnaissance drone that was launched from a parent aircraft. A ramjet uses the vehicle's forward motion to force air through the engine without resorting to turbines or vanes. Fuel is added and ignited, which heats and expands the air to provide thrust.

==== Scramjet ====
A scramjet is a specialized ramjet that uses internal supersonic airflow to compress, combine with fuel, combust and accelerate the exhaust to provide thrust. The engine operates at supersonic speeds only. The NASA X-43, an experimental unmanned scramjet, set a world speed record in 2004 for a jet-powered aircraft with a speed of Mach 9.7, nearly 12,100 kilometers per hour (7,500 mph).

==== Rocket ====
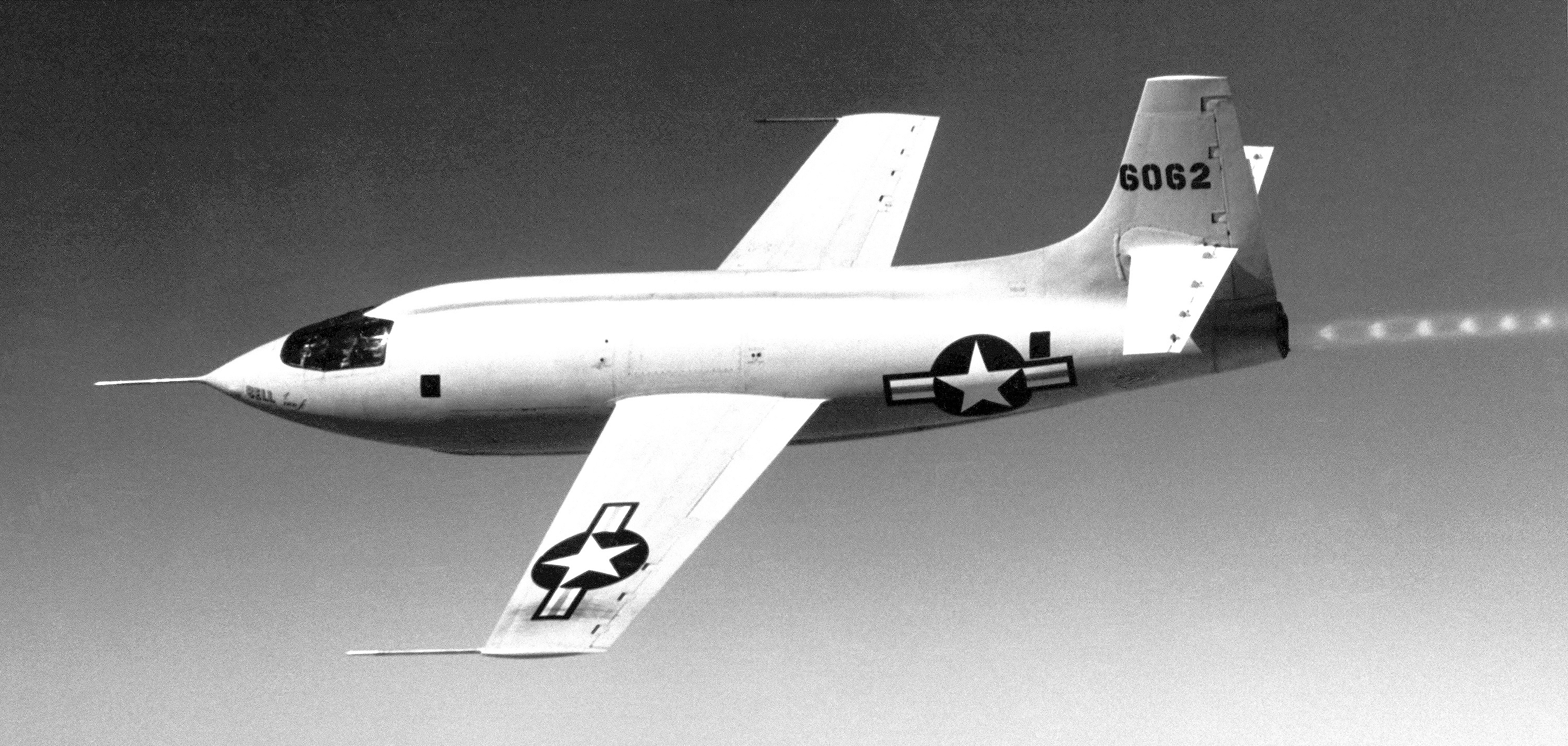
Bell X-1 in flight, 1947

Whereas jet aircraft use the atmosphere both as a source of oxidant and of mass to accelerate reactively behind the aircraft, rocket aircraft carry the oxidizer on board and accelerate the burned fuel and oxidizer backwards as the sole source of mass for reaction. Liquid fuel and oxidizer may be pumped into a combustion chamber or a solid fuel with oxidizer may burn in the fuel chamber. Whether liquid or solid-fueled, the hot gas is accelerated through a nozzle.

In World War II, the Germans deployed the Me 163 Komet rocket-powered aircraft. The first plane to break the sound barrier in level flight was a rocket plane – the Bell X-1 in 1948. The North American X-15 broke many speed and altitude records in the 1960s and pioneered engineering concepts for later aircraft and spacecraft. Military transport aircraft may employ rocket-assisted take offs for short-field situations. Otherwise, rocket aircraft include spaceplanes, like SpaceShipTwo, for travel beyond the Earth's atmosphere and sport aircraft developed for the short-lived Rocket Racing League.

== Design and manufacture ==
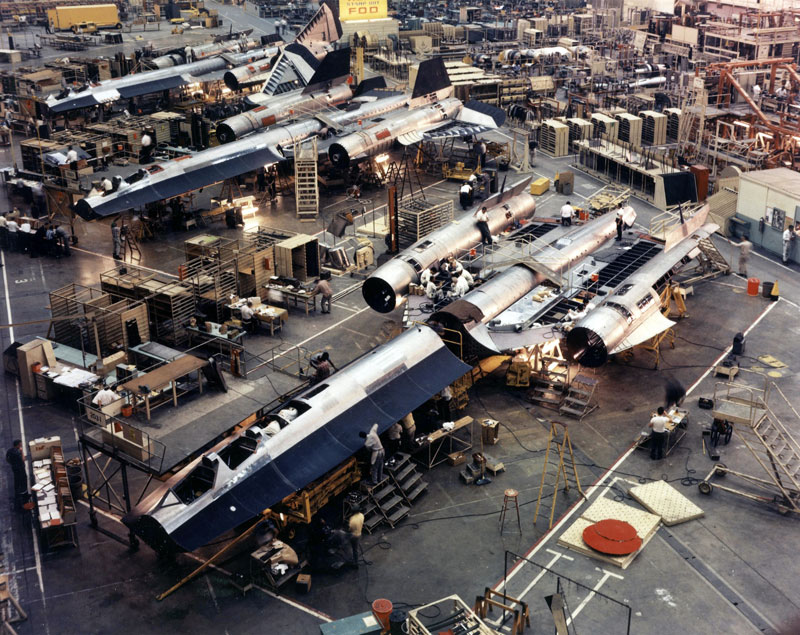
Assembly line of the SR-71 Blackbird at Skunk Works, Lockheed Martin's Advanced Development Programs (ADP).

Most airplanes are constructed by companies with the objective of producing them in quantity for customers. The design and planning process, including safety tests, can last up to four years for small turboprops or longer for larger planes.

During this process, the objectives and design specifications of the aircraft are established. First the construction company uses drawings and equations, simulations, wind tunnel tests and experience to predict the behavior of the aircraft. Computers are used by companies to draw, plan and do initial simulations of the aircraft. Small models and mockups of all or certain parts of the plane are then tested in wind tunnels to verify its aerodynamics.

When the design has passed through these processes, the company constructs a limited number of prototypes for testing on the ground. Representatives from an aviation governing agency often make a first flight. The flight tests continue until the aircraft has fulfilled all the requirements. Then, the governing public agency of aviation of the country authorizes the company to begin production.

In the United States, this agency is the Federal Aviation Administration (FAA). In the European Union, European Aviation Safety Agency (EASA); in the United Kingdom it is the Civil Aviation Authority (CAA). In Canada, the public agency in charge and authorizing the mass production of aircraft is Transport Canada's Civil Aviation Authority.

When a part or component needs to be joined by welding for virtually any aerospace or defense application, it must meet the most stringent and specific safety regulations and standards. Nadcap, or the National Aerospace and Defense Contractors Accreditation Program sets global requirements for quality, quality management and quality assurance for aerospace engineering.

In the case of international sales, a license from the public agency of aviation or transport of the country where the aircraft is to be used is also necessary. For example, airplanes made by the European company Airbus need to be certified by the FAA to be flown in the United States, and airplanes made by U.S.-based Boeing need to be approved by the EASA to be flown in the European Union.

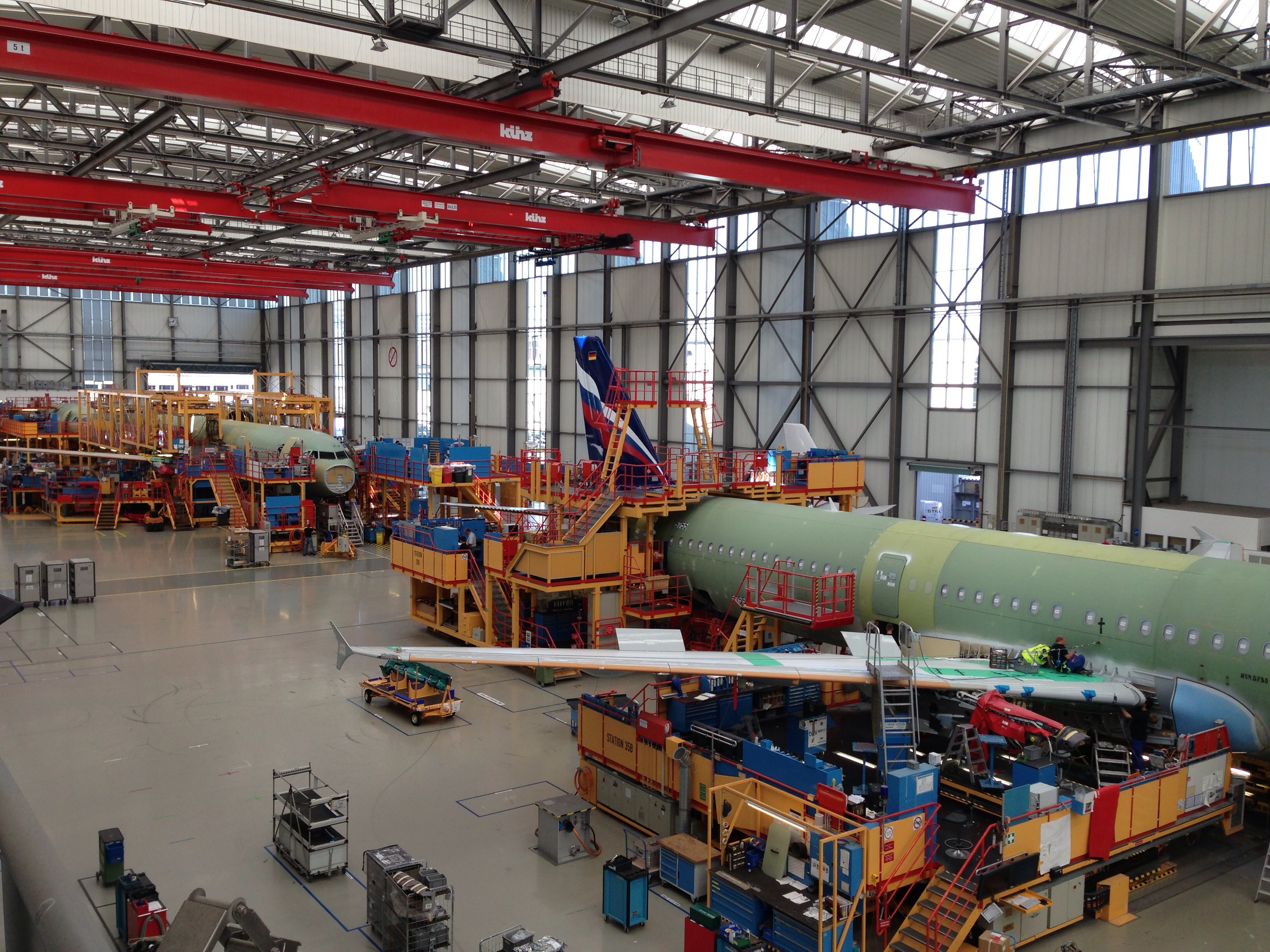
An Airbus A321 on final assembly line 3 in the Airbus Hamburg-Finkenwerder plant.

Regulations have resulted in reduced noise from aircraft engines in response to increased noise pollution from growth in air traffic over urban areas near airports.

Small planes can be designed and constructed by amateurs as homebuilts. Other homebuilt aircraft can be assembled using pre-manufactured kits of parts that can be assembled into a basic plane and must then be completed by the builder.

Few companies produce planes on a large scale. However, the production of a plane for one company is a process that actually involves dozens, or even hundreds, of other companies and plants, that produce the parts that go into the plane. For example, one company can be responsible for the production of the landing gear, while another one is responsible for the radar. The production of such parts is not limited to the same city or country; in the case of large plane manufacturing companies, such parts can come from all over the world. The parts are sent to the main plant of the plane company, where the production line is located. In the case of large planes, production lines dedicated to the assembly of certain parts of the plane can exist, especially the wings and the fuselage. When complete, a plane is rigorously inspected to search for imperfections and defects. After approval by inspectors, the plane is put through a series of flight tests to assure that all systems are working correctly and that the plane handles properly. To meet a particular customer need, the airplane may be customised using components or packages of components provided by the manufacturer or the customer.

== Characteristics ==
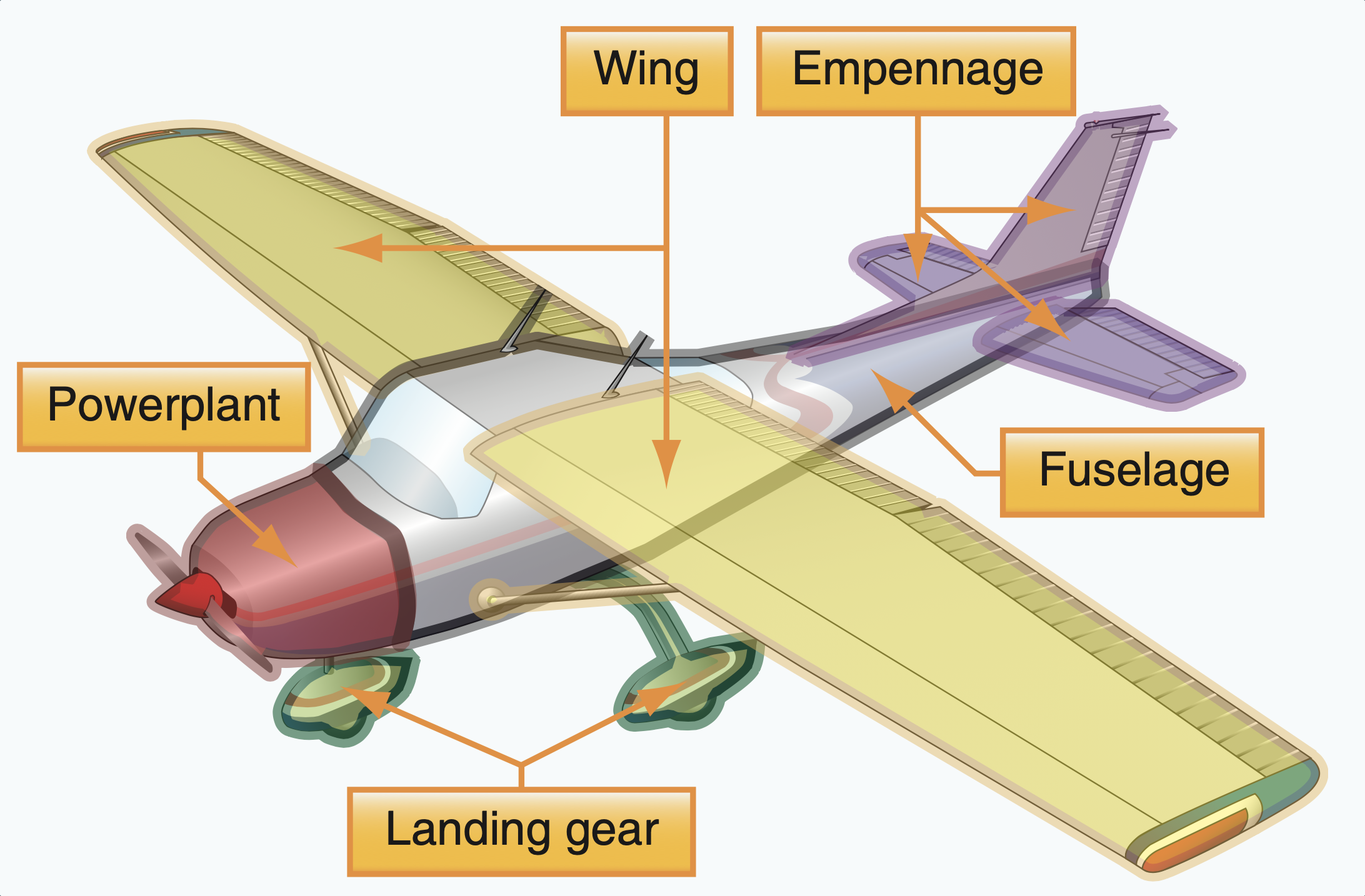
Major components of an airplane.

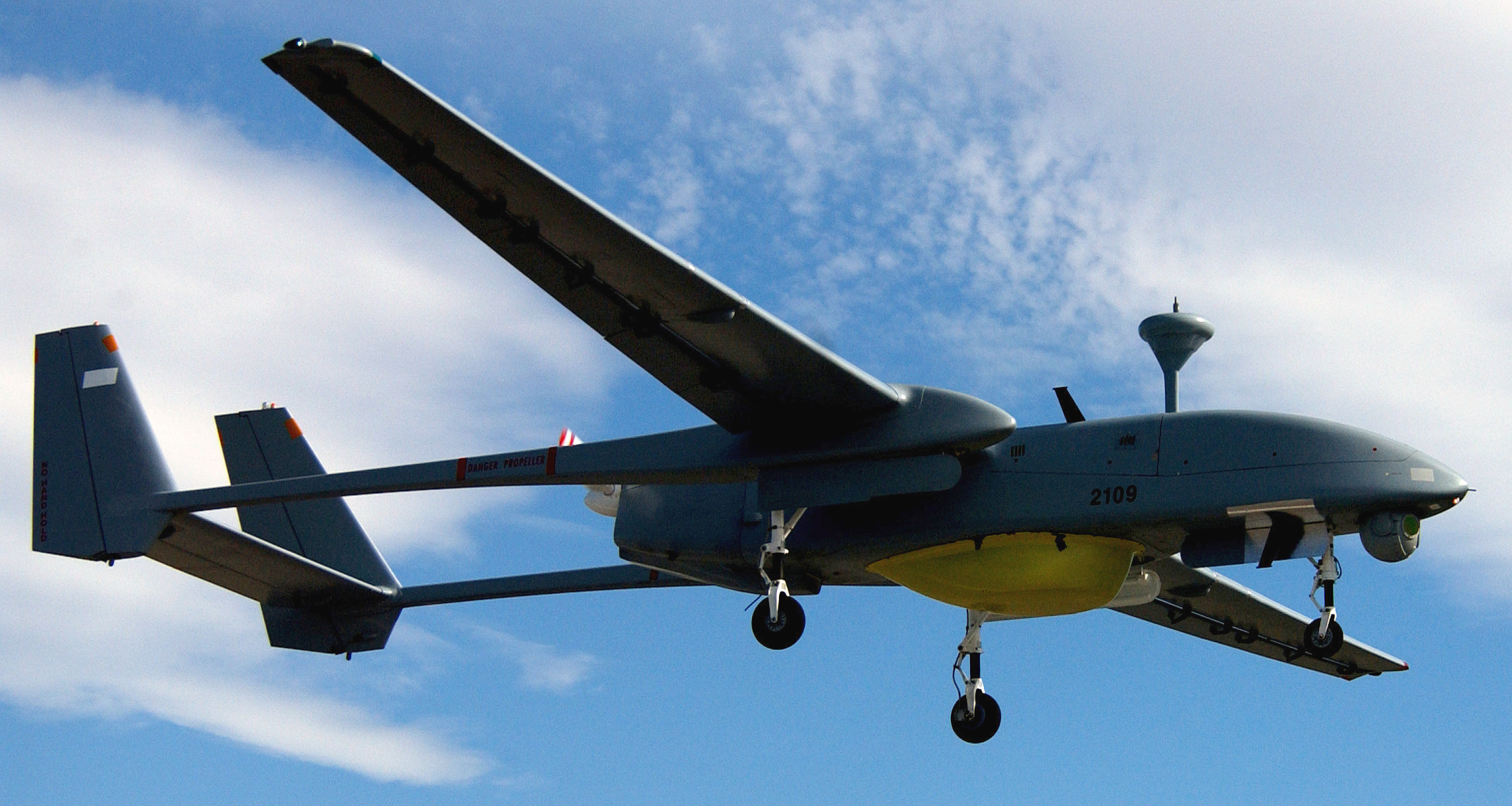
An IAI Heron - an unmanned aerial vehicle with a twin-boom configuration

=== Airframe ===
The structural parts of a fixed-wing aircraft are called the airframe. The parts present can vary according to the aircraft's type and purpose. Early types were usually made of wood with fabric wing surfaces, When engines became available for powered flight around a hundred years ago, their mounts were made of metal. Then as speeds increased more and more parts became metal until by the end of WWII all-metal aircraft were common. In modern times, increasing use of composite materials has been made.

Typical structural parts include:

- One or more large horizontal wings, often with an airfoil cross-section shape. The wing deflects air downward as the aircraft moves forward, generating lifting force to support it in flight. The wing also provides stability in roll to stop the aircraft from rolling to the left or right in steady flight.

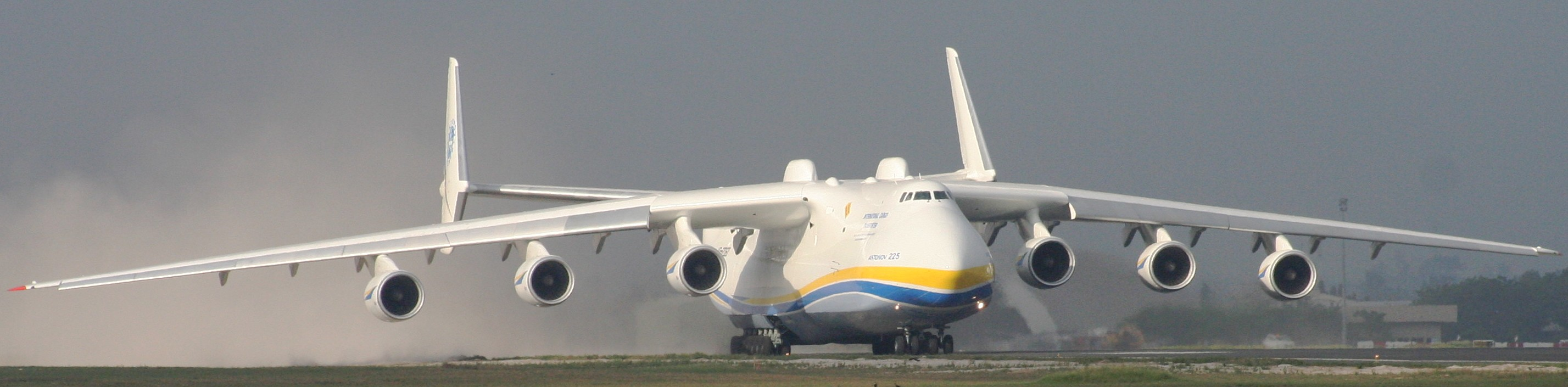
The An-225 Mriya, which could carry a 250-tonne payload, had two vertical stabilizers.

- A fuselage, a long, thin body, usually with tapered or rounded ends to make its shape aerodynamically smooth. The fuselage joins the other parts of the airframe and usually contains important things such as the pilot, payload and flight systems.
- A vertical stabilizer or fin is a vertical wing-like surface mounted at the rear of the plane and typically protruding above it. The fin stabilizes the plane's yaw (turn left or right) and mounts the rudder, which controls its rotation along that axis.
- A horizontal stabilizer or tailplane, usually mounted at the tail near the vertical stabilizer. The horizontal stabilizer is used to stabilize the plane's pitch (tilt up or down) and mounts the elevators, which provide pitch control.
- Landing gear, a set of wheels, skids, or floats that support the plane while it is on the surface. On seaplanes, the bottom of the fuselage or floats (pontoons) support it while on the water. On some planes the landing gear retracts during flight to reduce drag.

=== Wings ===
The wings of a fixed-wing aircraft are static planes extending either side of the aircraft. When the aircraft travels forwards, air flows over the wings, which are shaped to create lift. This shape is called an airfoil and is shaped like a bird's wing.

==== Wing structure ====
Airplanes have flexible wing surfaces which are stretched across a frame and made rigid by the lift forces exerted by the airflow over them. Larger aircraft have rigid wing surfaces which provide additional strength.

Whether flexible or rigid, most wings have a strong frame to give them their shape and to transfer lift from the wing surface to the rest of the aircraft. The main structural elements are one or more spars running from root to tip, and many ribs running from the leading (front) to the trailing (rear) edge.

Early airplane engines had little power, and lightness was very important. Also, early airfoil sections were very thin, and could not have a strong frame installed within. So, until the 1930s, most wings were too lightweight to have enough strength, and external bracing struts and wires were added. When the available engine power increased during the 1920s and 30s, wings could be made heavy and strong enough that bracing was not needed any more. This type of unbraced wing is called a cantilever wing.

==== Wing configuration ====
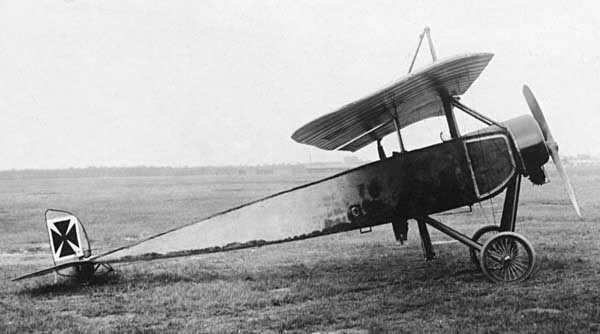
Captured Morane-Saulnier L wire-braced parasol monoplane

The number and shape of the wings varies widely on different types. A given wing plane may be full-span or divided by a central fuselage into port (left) and starboard (right) wings. Occasionally, even more wings have been used, with the three-winged triplane achieving some fame in WWI. The four-winged quadruplane and other multiplane designs have had little success.

A monoplane has a single wing plane, a biplane has two stacked one above the other, a tandem wing has two placed one behind the other. When the available engine power increased during the 1920s and 30s and bracing was no longer needed, the unbraced or cantilever monoplane became the most common form of powered type.

The wing planform is the shape when seen from above. To be aerodynamically efficient, a wing should be straight with a long span from side to side but have a short chord (high aspect ratio). But to be structurally efficient, and hence light weight, a wing must have a short span but still enough area to provide lift (low aspect ratio).

At transonic speeds (near the speed of sound), it helps to sweep the wing backwards or forwards to reduce drag from supersonic shock waves as they begin to form. The swept wing is just a straight wing swept backwards or forwards.

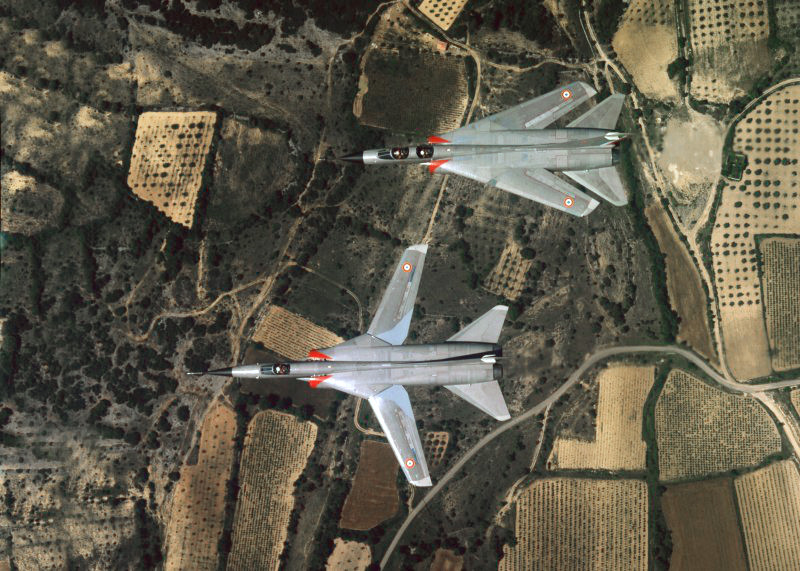
Two Dassault Mirage G prototypes, one with wings swept

The delta wing is a triangle shape that may be used for several reasons. As a flexible Rogallo wing, it allows a stable shape under aerodynamic forces and so is often used for ultralight aircraft and even kites. As a supersonic wing, it combines high strength with low drag and so is often used for fast jets.

A variable geometry wing can be changed in flight to a different shape. The variable-sweep wing transforms between an efficient straight configuration for takeoff and landing, to a low-drag swept configuration for high-speed flight. Other forms of variable planform have been flown, but none have gone beyond the research stage.

=== Fuselage ===
A fuselage is a long, thin body, usually with tapered or rounded ends to make its shape aerodynamically smooth. The fuselage may contain the flight crew, passengers, cargo or payload, fuel and engines. The pilots of manned aircraft operate them from a cockpit located at the front or top of the fuselage and equipped with controls and usually windows and instruments. A plane may have more than one fuselage, or it may be fitted with booms with the tail located between the booms to allow the extreme rear of the fuselage to be useful for a variety of purposes.

=== Wings vs. bodies ===
==== Flying wing ====
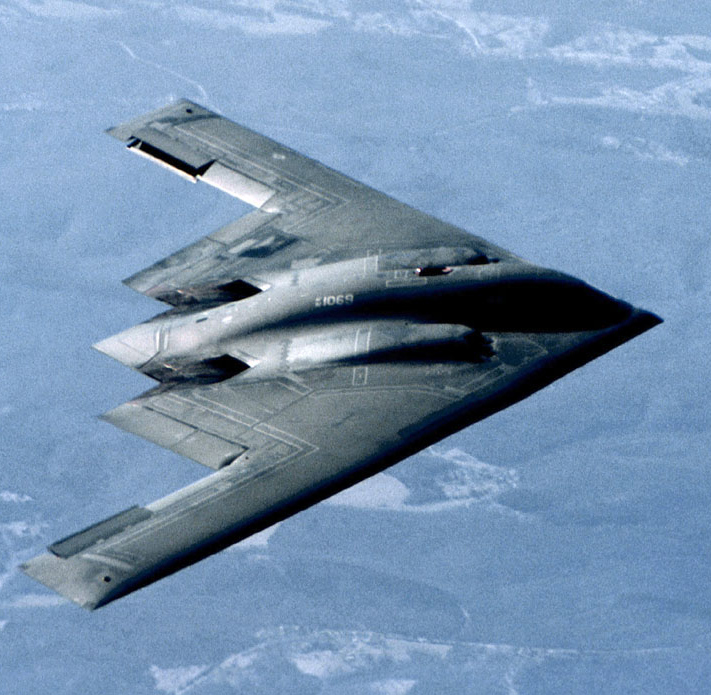
The US-produced B-2 Spirit is a strategic bomber. It has a flying wing configuration and is capable of intercontinental missions

A flying wing is a tailless aircraft which has no definite fuselage. Most of the crew, payload and equipment are housed inside the main wing structure.

The flying wing configuration was studied extensively in the 1930s and 1940s, notably by Jack Northrop and Cheston L. Eshelman in the United States, and Alexander Lippisch and the Horten brothers in Germany. After the war, several experimental designs were based on the flying wing concept, but the known difficulties remained intractable. Some general interest continued until the early 1950s but designs did not necessarily offer a great advantage in range and presented several technical problems, leading to the adoption of "conventional" solutions like the Convair B-36 and the B-52 Stratofortress. Due to the practical need for a deep wing, the flying wing concept is most practical for designs in the slow-to-medium speed range, and there has been continual interest in using it as a tactical airlifter design.

Interest in flying wings was renewed in the 1980s due to their potentially low radar reflection cross-sections. Stealth technology relies on shapes which only reflect radar waves in certain directions, thus making the aircraft hard to detect unless the radar receiver is at a specific position relative to the aircraft - a position that changes continuously as the aircraft moves. This approach eventually led to the Northrop B-2 Spirit stealth bomber. In this case, the aerodynamic advantages of the flying wing are not the primary needs. However, modern computer-controlled fly-by-wire systems allowed for many of the aerodynamic drawbacks of the flying wing to be minimized, making for an efficient and stable long-range bomber.

==== Blended wing body ====
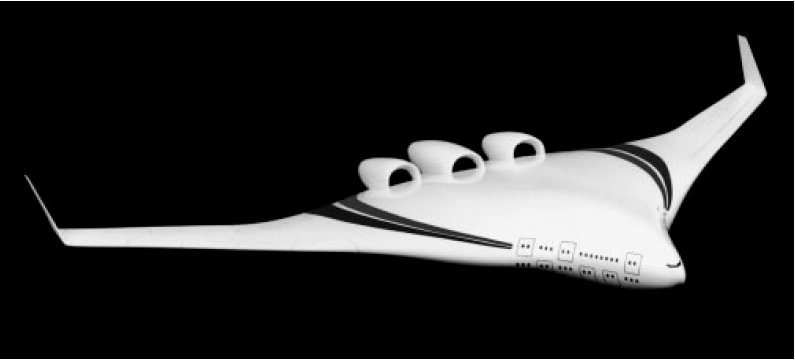
Computer-generated model of the Boeing X-48

Blended wing body aircraft have a flattened and airfoil shaped body, which produces most of the lift to keep itself aloft, and distinct and separate wing structures, though the wings are smoothly blended in with the body.

Thus blended wing bodied aircraft incorporate design features from both a futuristic fuselage and flying wing design. The purported advantages of the blended wing body approach are efficient high-lift wings and a wide airfoil-shaped body. This enables the entire craft to contribute to lift generation with the result of potentially increased fuel economy.

==== Lifting body ====
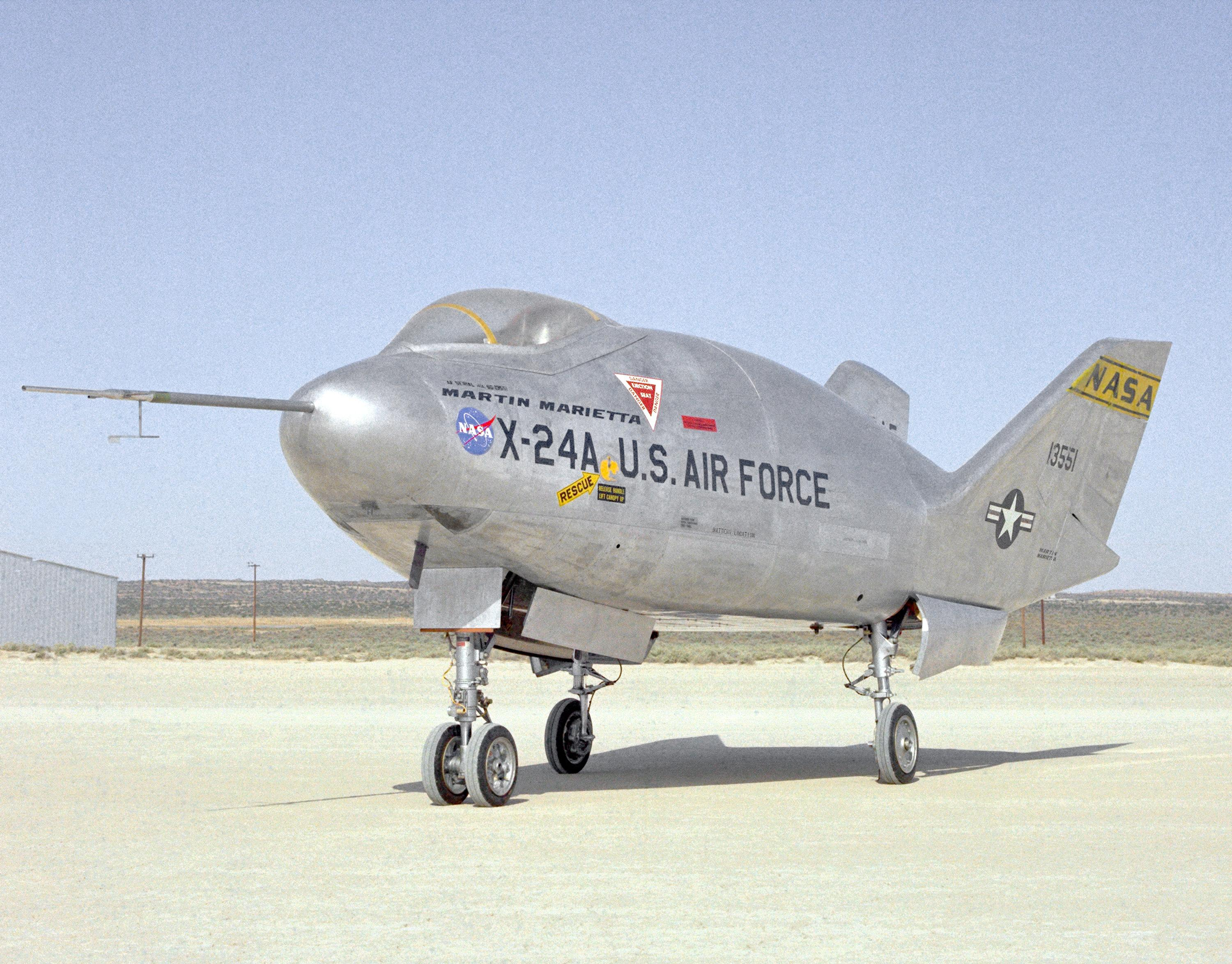
The Martin Aircraft Company X-24 was built as part of a 1963 to 1975 experimental US military program.

A lifting body is a configuration in which the body itself produces lift. In contrast to a flying wing, which is a wing with minimal or no conventional fuselage, a lifting body can be thought of as a fuselage with little or no conventional wing. Whereas a flying wing seeks to maximize cruise efficiency at subsonic speeds by eliminating non-lifting surfaces, lifting bodies generally minimize the drag and structure of a wing for subsonic, supersonic, and hypersonic flight, or, spacecraft re-entry. All of these flight regimes pose challenges for proper flight stability.

Lifting bodies were a major area of research in the 1960s and 1970s as a means to build a small and lightweight crewed spacecraft. The US built several famous lifting body rocket planes to test the concept, as well as several rocket-launched re-entry vehicles that were tested over the Pacific. Interest waned as the US Air Force lost interest in the crewed mission, and major development ended during the Space Shuttle design process when it became clear that the highly shaped fuselages made it difficult to fit fuel tankage.

=== Empennage and foreplane ===
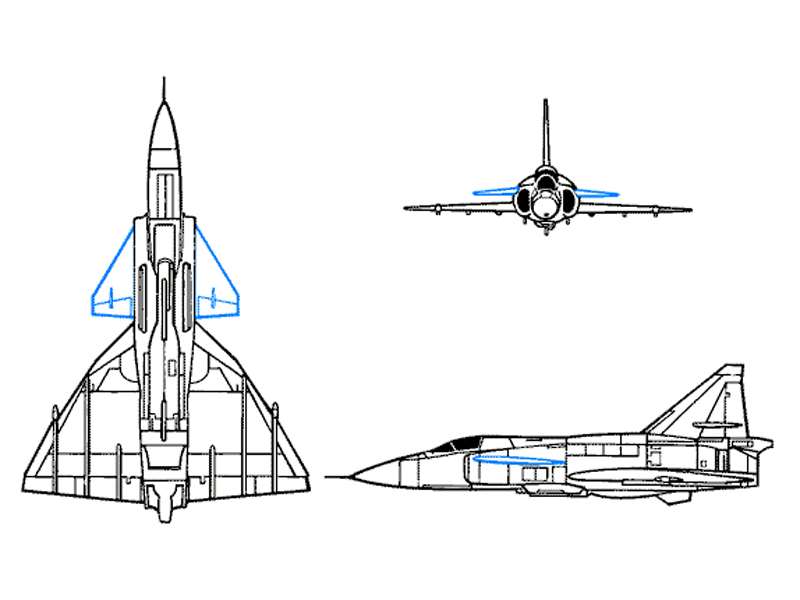
Canards on the Saab Viggen

The classic airfoil section wing is unstable in flight and difficult to control. Flexible-wing types often rely on an anchor line or the weight of a pilot hanging beneath to maintain the correct attitude. Some free-flying types use an adapted airfoil that is stable, or other ingenious mechanisms including, most recently, electronic artificial stability.

To achieve stability and control, most fixed-wing types have an empennage comprising a fin and rudder which act horizontally and a tailplane and elevator which act vertically. These control surfaces can typically be trimmed to relieve control forces for various stages of flight. This is so common that it is known as the conventional layout. Sometimes there may be two or more fins, spaced out along the tailplane.

Some types have a horizontal "canard" foreplane ahead of the main wing, instead of behind it. This foreplane may contribute to the lift, the trim, or control of the aircraft, or to several of these.

=== Controls and instruments ===
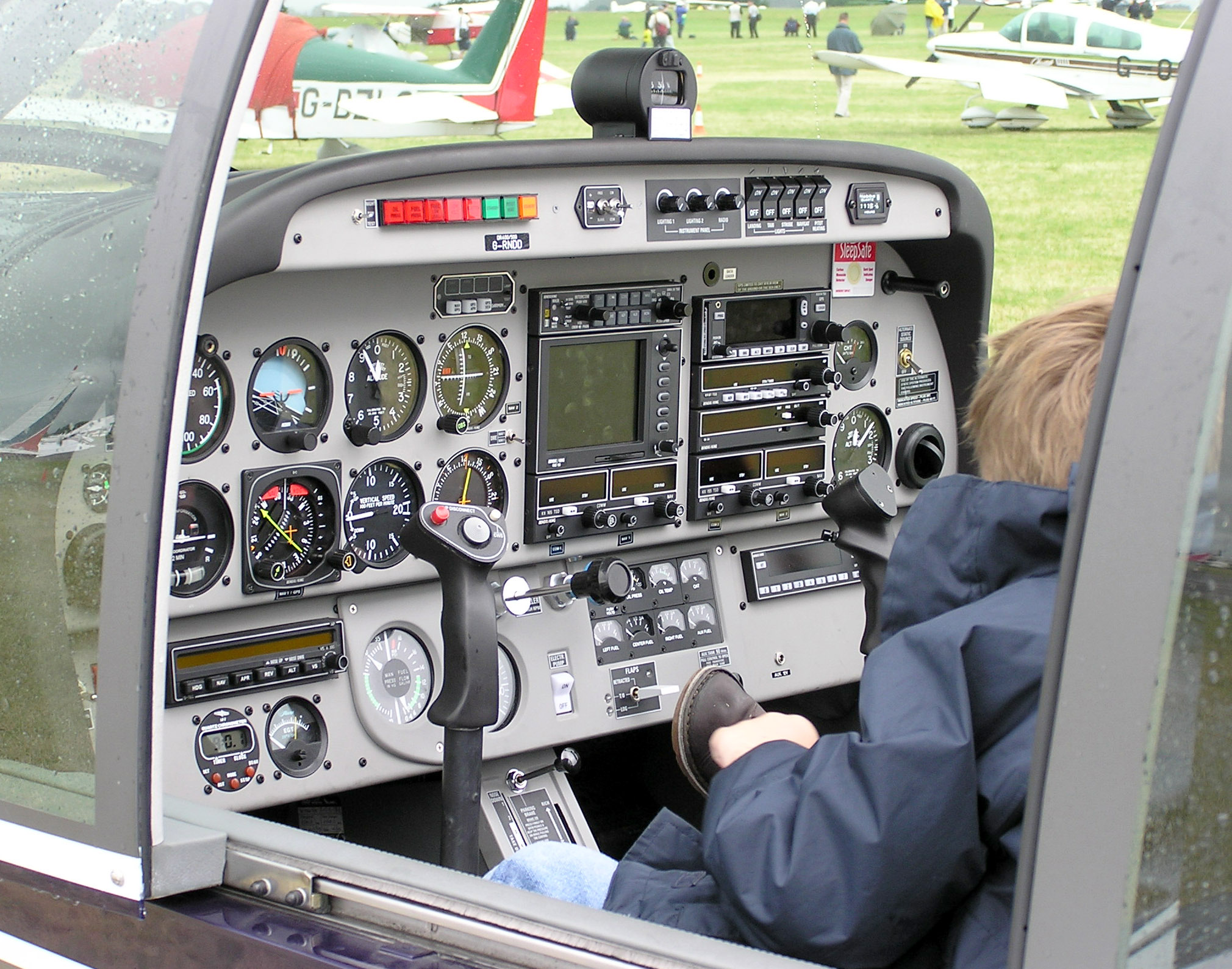
A light aircraft (Robin DR400/500) cockpit

Airplanes have complex flight control systems. The main controls allow the pilot to direct the aircraft in the air by controlling the attitude (roll, pitch and yaw) and engine thrust.

On manned aircraft, cockpit instruments provide information to the pilots, including flight data, engine output, navigation, communications and other aircraft systems that may be installed.

== Safety ==
When risk is measured by deaths per passenger kilometer, air travel is approximately 10 times safer than travel by bus or rail. However, when using the deaths per journey statistic, air travel is significantly more dangerous than car, rail, or bus travel. Air travel insurance is relatively expensive for this reason—insurers generally use the deaths per journey statistic. There is a significant difference between the safety of airliners and that of smaller private planes, with the per-mile statistic indicating that airliners are 8.3 times safer than smaller planes.

== Environmental impact ==
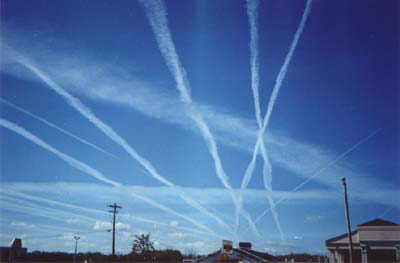
Water vapor contrails left by high-altitude jet airliners. These may contribute to cirrus cloud formation.

Like all activities involving combustion, fossil-fuel-powered aircraft release soot and other pollutants into the atmosphere. Greenhouse gases such as carbon dioxide (CO_{2}) are also produced. In addition, there are environmental impacts specific to airplanes: for instance,

- Airplanes operating at high altitudes near the tropopause (mainly large jet airliners) emit aerosols and leave contrails, both of which can increase cirrus cloud formation – cloud cover may have increased by up to 0.2% since the birth of aviation.
- Airplanes operating at high altitudes near the tropopause can also release chemicals that interact with greenhouse gases at those altitudes, particularly nitrogen compounds, which interact with ozone, increasing ozone concentrations.
- Most light piston aircraft burn avgas, which contains tetraethyllead (TEL). Some lower-compression piston engines can operate on unleaded mogas and turbine engines and diesel engines – neither of which require lead – are used on some newer light aircraft. Some non-polluting light electric aircraft are already in production.

Another environmental impact of airplanes is noise pollution, mainly caused by aircraft taking off and landing.

== See also ==
- Aircraft flight mechanics
- Aviation
- Fuel efficiency
- List of altitude records reached by different aircraft types
- Rotorcraft

== Bibliography ==
- Blatner, David. The Flying Book: Everything You've Ever Wondered About Flying On Airplanes. ISBN 0-8027-7691-4

	Aerostat	Aerodyne		
	Lift: Lighter than air gas	Lift: Fixed wing	Lift: Unpowered rotor	Lift: Powered rotor
Unpowered free flight	(Free) balloon	Glider	Helicopter, etc. in autorotation	(None – see note 2)
Tethered (static or towed)	Tethered balloon	Kite	Rotor kite	(None – see note 2)
Powered	Airship	Airplane, ornithopter, etc.	Autogyro	Gyrodyne, helicopter
