= Element Materials Technology =

Auditing and inspection company in London

Element Materials Technology Group Limited
- Company type: Limited company
- Industry: Testing Inspection and Certification
- Predecessor: Exova, Cobham Technical Services Lightning
- Founded: 2010; 16 years ago
- Headquarters: London, United Kingdom
- Area served: Worldwide
- Key people: Allan Leighton (Chair); Jo Wetz (CEO)
- Services: materials testing and provision of certification schemes in building material, aerospace, transportation, health sciences, oil and gas, and fire protection
- Revenue: ▲£913.0 million (2021)
- Operating income: ▲£43.4 million (2021)
- Net income: ▲£(212.9) million (2021)
- Owner: Temasek Holdings
- Number of employees: 7,000 (2022)
- Website: www.element.com

Element is a British testing, inspection and certification (TIC) company headquartered in London providing services worldwide. It specialises in materials testing and provision of certification schemes in building material, aerospace, transportation, health sciences, oil and gas, and fire protection.

In 2020, the company was ranked as number 15 in the Sunday Times Top Track 250, i.e one of top fifteen private mid-market growth companies in the UK. It has been described by its former investor, Bridgepoint Group as the "undisputed heavyweight in testing, inspection and certification" in the UK.

== History ==
Element was founded in November 2010 after the 3i-backed management buyout of the Materials and Testing group of Stork B.V.

Bridgepoint Group bought Element from 3i in 2015 and went on to acquire various companies. Its most notable acquisition was Exova Group plc - which had itself acquired several firms - from a collection of shareholders led by Clayton, Dubilier & Rice, for £620m in cash in April 2017. Allan Leighton was appointed chairman at that time.

Temasek Holdings acquired a minority stake in Element in 2019.

The company went on to acquire Impact Analytical Inc., a provider of analytical services in North America, in February 2021, Arch Sciences Group, a provider of analytical services based in Manchester, in July 2021, and JMI Laboratories, a provider of antimicrobial resistance monitoring services in North America, in January 2022.

Element was acquired by Temasek Holdings in January 2022, when Bridgepoint agreed to an offer that valued the business at $7bn. Cinven and CPP Investment Board had also been considering making bids valued at circa $4bn.

== Operations ==
The company provide specialist testing services for the building material, aerospace, transportation, health sciences, oil and gas, and fire protection industries. Sector competitors include Intertek, Bureau Veritas, NPL and SGS.
