= Temasek Holdings =

Singaporean state-owned conglomerate

Temasek Holdings (Private) Limited

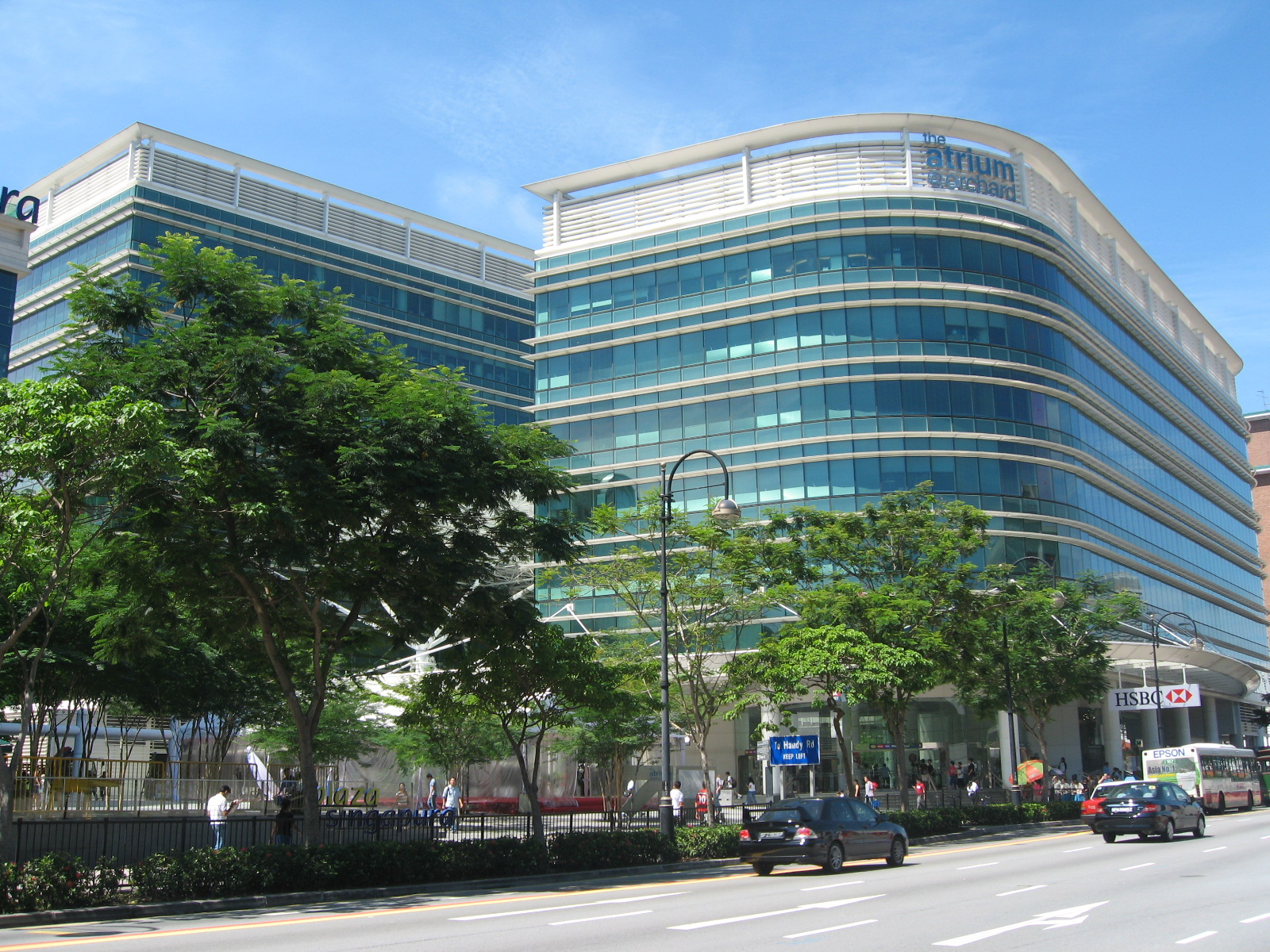
- Temasek headquarters at the Atrium@Orchard in Singapore
- Type: State-owned private limited company
- Industry: Investment management
- Founded: 25 June 1974; 52 years ago
- Headquarters: Orchard Road, Singapore
- Key people: Teo Chee Hean (Chairman); Dilhan Pillay Sandrasegara (CEO)
- Total assets: ▲US$568 billion (2026)
- Owner: Government of Singapore
- Number of employees: 970 (2026)
- Subsidiaries: Alvogen; AS Watson (25%); CapitaLand (100%); Certis Group; Constellar Group; DBS Bank (30%); Element Materials Technology (88%); Keppel; Mandai Wildlife Group; Mapletree Investments (100%); Mediacorp; Pavilion Energy; PSA International; SATS (40%); Seatrium; Singapore Airlines (60%); Singtel; SMRT Corporation (100%); SP Group; ST Engineering; ST Telemedia; Standard Chartered PLC (20%); Surbana Jurong; Vertex Holdings; VFS Global (20%); and more
- Website: www.temasek.com.sg

Temasek Holdings (Private) Limited (IPA: /təˈmɑːseɪk/ tə-MAH-sayk (Note: Alternatively, /təˈmɑːsɪk/ tə-MAH-sikk.)) is a Singaporean state-owned multinational investment firm. Incorporated on 25 June 1974, Temasek has a net portfolio of S$518 billion as of October 2026. Headquartered at Orchard Road, Singapore, it has 13 offices in nine countries around the world, including in Beijing, Brussels, Hanoi, London, Mexico City, Mumbai, New York City, Paris, San Francisco, Shanghai, Shenzhen, and Washington D.C.

It is an active shareholder and investor, with four key structural trends guiding its long term portfolio construction—Digitisation, Sustainable Living, Future of Consumption, and Longer Lifespans. Temasek's portfolio covers a broad spectrum of sectors. Its key focus investment areas include Consumer, Media & Technology, Life Sciences & Agri-Food, and Non-Bank Financial Services.

Temasek has held overall corporate global credit ratings of "Aaa/AAA" by rating agencies Moody's and Standard & Poor's respectively since its inaugural credit ratings in 2004. It has also attained perfect quarterly scores on the Linaburg-Maduell Transparency Index, a measure of the openness of government-owned investment funds. Temasek is primarily anchored in Asia, with underlying country exposure of 27% Singapore, 26% China, 17% Americas, 12% Asia Pacific (excluding Singapore, China and India), 11% Europe, Middle East and Africa, and 7% India as at 31 March 2026.

While Temasek is largely considered as being a sovereign wealth fund (SWF), there are major differences as it invests mostly in equities, is the outright owner of many assets and companies, and pays taxes like other commercial investment firms. Temasek's one-year total shareholder return (TSR) was 10.5%, with longer term 10-year and 20-year TSRs at 7.1% and 6.8% respectively, compounded annually. In addition to Temasek, the Government of Singapore also owns GIC Private Limited, a traditional SWF which manages about US$1.181 trillion of assets as of 2026 and the compulsory pension programme Central Provident Fund (CPF) with assets of US$436 billion, giving a total publicly known AUM of approximately US$2.185 trillion.

== Status ==
Temasek is a company incorporated under the Singapore Companies Act. It is wholly owned by a government officer—the Singapore Minister for Finance, who is its single shareholder. Despite this, it claims to be neither a government agency nor a statutory board. Like other commercial companies, Temasek pays taxes in the countries in which it operates, distributes dividends (although only to a single, government shareholder), has a board of directors and a professional management team.

Temasek is designated a Fifth Schedule entity under the Constitution of Singapore, which imposes certain safeguards to protect the government's past reserves. For instance, the approval of the President of Singapore is required for any transaction which is likely to result in a draw-down of Temasek's cash reserves. The president also has the right to appoint, terminate, or renew the members of Temasek's board of directors. In most other respects, however, Temasek operates as an independent commercial investment holding company.

In a 2009 speech, Ho Ching, then Temasek Holdings' Executive Director and CEO, said that the company had made an effort to instill discipline and professionalism, and to be tested and measured by providing public markers of performance. She noted that Temasek's bonds spreads and credit ratings have been regularly and independently monitored as public markers of Temasek's financial position and credit risks. Temasek had also openly and accurately disclosed its financial information through its annual report (although Ho said that, as a private company, it was not legally obliged to do so).

== History ==
At the point of Singapore's independence in August 1965, the Government of Singapore had ownership or joint ownership of various local companies, such as Malaysia-Singapore Airlines (later split up into Malaysia Airlines and Singapore Airlines) and the Singapore Telephone Board (which became Singapore Telecommunications and subsequently Singtel). As part of its push for local and foreign private investment in sectors such as manufacturing and shipbuilding, the government's Economic Development Board (EDB) also bought minority stakes in a variety of local companies. During the first ten years after independence, the government acquired or established several companies, such as the Keppel Corporation (originally Keppel Shipyard, taken over from the Royal Navy after the British military withdrawal from Singapore), ST Engineering (originally a weapon manufacturer set up to supply the Singapore Armed Forces), and the shipping company Neptune Orient Lines.

On 25 June 1974, Temasek was incorporated under the Singapore Companies Act to hold and manage the assets previously held directly by the Singapore government, named for an early settlement on the island. The goal was for Temasek to own and manage these investments on a commercial basis, allowing the Ministry of Finance and the Ministry of Trade and Industry to focus on policymaking.

In February 2020, Temasek announced a company-wide wage freeze and voluntary pay cuts for senior management in part to help fund community programs aimed at alleviating the impact of COVID-19.

On 1 October 2021, Dilhan Pillay Sandrasegara, the current chief executive officer of Temasek International (TI), succeeded Ho Ching as executive director and chief executive officer of Temasek Holdings.

On 6 June 2025, Temasek announced that Senior Minister and former Deputy Prime Minister Teo Chee Hean would succeed Lim Boon Heng as chairman on 9 October 2025, after joining as deputy chairman on 1 July 2025.

On 28 August 2025, Temasek announced it would create three wholly owned entities effective 1 April 2026: Temasek Global Investments, Temasek Singapore, and Temasek Partnership Solutions. Temasek International would house the firm's group and corporate functions, providing enterprise-wide governance, strategic, and operational support to these entities. As part of the changes, Chia Song Hwee became CEO of Temasek Global Investments. Other appointments include Nagi Hamiyeh, Head of Europe, Middle East and Africa, to be concurrently appointed as Temasek Global Investments' President, and Png Chin Yee, CFO, concurrently appointed as Temasek Singapore's President.

== Investments ==
Temasek's initial portfolio of S$354 million comprised shares previously held by the Singapore Government, including a bird park, a hotel, a shoemaker, a detergent producer, naval yards converted into a ship repair business, a start-up airline, and an iron and steel mill.

=== 2000s ===
Temasek's 2006 acquisition of Shin Corporation, owned by the family of then Thai prime minister Thaksin Shinawatra, was particularly controversial, with protestors burning effigies of Lee and Ho on the streets of Bangkok. The deal was a factor in exacerbating the Thai political crisis, which eventually led to the downfall of Thaksin and a review of the transaction's legality. The military junta that overthrew Thaksin later tried unsuccessfully to force Temasek to divest a large part of its investment in Shin Corp. As of 2015, Temasek's stake in Intouch Corporation (as Shin Corporation was renamed) had reduced to 42%. In 2016, Temasek sold a further 21% stake in Intouch Holdings, the Thai telecoms conglomerate formerly known as Shin Corp.

=== 2010s ===
Beginning in 2015, Temasek began making large investments in agricultural and agricultural-related companies and ventures.

By the end of the 2015 financial year, Temasek held a 51% stake in SingTel, valued at approximately $61.9 billion. In April 2017, Temasek made an investment into Intapp, a provider of enterprise software. The deal also included a stake in Intapp.

In June 2018, Temasek invested S$340 million in a minority stake in UST Global, a digital technology services company.

Temasek purchased 30 per cent of Haldor Topsoe's shares in March 2019. The investment company was selected in recognition of the value that it would add through its deep insights and connections in Asian growth and other emerging markets, according to the Danish engineering firm. The transaction price was not disclosed.

=== 2020s ===
In August 2020, Temasek Holdings added a 3.9 percent stake in BlackRock Inc, worth about US$3.5 billion, becoming one of its largest shareholders. According to people familiar with the matter, Temasek was one of several players that bought the money manager's shares when PNC Financial Services Group Inc. sold a US$14 billion stake earlier in the year. Temasek and BlackRock created the joint venture Decarbonization Partners, which invests in companies that work to accelerate the decarbonization of the global economy.

In March 2020, for the first time since the forming of the company, Temasek held more investments in another country than in Singapore, with 24% of assets in Singapore and 29% in China.

Temasek purchased stock from Kuaishou Technology during its initial public offering in January 2021.

In January 2022, Temasek purchased Element Materials Technology for $7 billion from London-based Bridgepoint Group. Temasek already held a minority stake in Element, which it purchased in 2019.

In May 2022, Temasek was finalizing talks to lead a $50 million financing round for DotPe, an Indian startup backed by Google.

In August 2022, Temasek led a $100 million financing round for Animoca Brands.

In April 2023, Temasek announced that it would acquire an additional 41 percent stake in Bengaluru-based Manipal Health Enterprises (MHE), resulting in a total stake of 59 per cent. In October 2023, Temasek participated in a $1.7 billion fundraising round for parking technology company Metropolis Technologies.

In June 2024, Temasek was finalizing its sale of some assets from liquefied natural gas (LNG) trading company Pavilion Energy to Shell, with the deal worth hundreds of millions of US dollars.

In January 2024, Temasek and EQT sold the renewable energy platform O2 Power for $1.5 billion to JSW Energy.

In April 2025, Temasek invested together with TPG to acquire a substantial minority stake into the U.S. asset manager Cliffwater.

Temasek announced in August 2025, that it would divide its operations into Temasek Global Investments (TGI), Temasek Singapore (TSG) and Temasek Partners Solutions (TPS) to manage its portfolio segments. Temasek together with the Singapore sovereign wealth fund account for 20% of the Singapore governments budget.

In July 2026, Temasek said that it aimed to increase its exposure to artificial-intelligence companies from 6 percent of its portfolio to as much as 15 percent by 2031. It identified energy and data centres, semiconductors, cloud-service providers, foundation models, and AI applications and software infrastructure as five priority investment areas.

=== Real estate ===
In 2004, Temasek acquired HDB Corp, which was renamed in 2005 to Surbana Corp. In 2008, Temasek increased its stake in the property firm Mapletree Logistic Trust to 46.9%. The parent company Mapletree Investments is wholly owned by Temasek. Temasek acquired additional shares in Keppel Land, raising its total stake to 52.9%, in October 2009. It also holds shares in Keppel Land's parent company, Keppel Ltd.

Temasek began a joint venture in 2011 with Khazanah Nasional and established M+S Pte. Ltd., in which Temasek holds a 40% stake. They also created Pulau Indah Ventures, each holding an 50% interest. In 2015, Temasek established Mandai Park Holdings, which oversees and operates various nature and wildlife parks in Singapore. In February 2015, Surbana International Consultants and Jurong International Holdings merged to form Surbana Jurong, a wholly owned subsidiary of Temasek.

Temasek acquired a 52% stake in CapitaLand Investment Management, when it was spun off from the CapitaLand Group in 2021, in which Temasek also holds a 52% stake. Temasek also owns CLA Real Estate Holdings, which, together with Mapletree, owns Cuscaden Peak Investments.

=== Consumer and Retail ===
In March 2014, Temasek purchased a 24.9% stake in AS Watson, a health and beauty retailer, for $5.7 billion. The company invested $468 million into the Swiss travel retailer Dufry, alongside Qatar Investment Authority and the Singapore Investment Corp (GIC) in 2015. In 2017, Temasek and GIC sold their combined stake of 16.2% to HNA Group.

In 2015, Temasek participated in a $1.5 billion funding round for Airbnb. In 2016, Temasek led a $110 million funding round for the startup Farfetch. Later in the year, Temasek gained a minority stake in Moncler through an investment firm. In August 2017, Temasek purchased a 30% stake in the Italian streetwear brand Stone Island, which was sold to Moncler in 2021.

In April 2018, Temasek led a $114 million funding round for Impossible Foods, a United States-based producer of plant-based products. It subsequently participated in two further rounds totalling $700 million in March and August 2020. Temasek led the $100 million funding round for Flywire Corporation, a global payments company, in September 2018. In February 2019, Temasek co-led a $400 million funding round for DoorDash during its initial public offering. In February 2019, Temasek invested in Zilingo.

In September 2020, through MacRitchie Investments, Temasek invested $62 million in the Indian food delivery platform Zomato. In November 2020 Temasek with Creadev led a EUR140 million series C financing of French biotechnology company InnovaFeed. In August 2021, Temasek invested into the mobility technology platform Didi Global, and increased its holdings in Baidu, a Chinese multinational technology firm. However, in November 2021, Temasek had reduced its shares in Alibaba by 16%, in Didi Global by 11%, and fully divested its position in Baidu.

In May 2022, Temasek together with Ventury Partners led a $108 million financing round for Indian startup Country Delight. In June 2024, Temasek and Fidelity invested $200 million in the eyewear retailer Lenskart, at an estimated valuation of $5 billion. In March 2025, Temasek purchased a 10% stake in Haldiram's for $1 billion. Temasek had increased their shares in JD.com, an online retailer, by 6.1 million in 2016, before reducing it in 2025 to under 600,000. The company also reduced its stake in Alibaba to 1.85 million shares in the same year.

In December 2024, Temasek led a $210 million funding round for cloud kitchen operator Rebel Foods. In July 2025, Temasek increased its stake in Ermenegildo Zegna Group, an Italian luxury apparel company, to 10 per cent by purchasing 14.1 million shares for $126 million.

In December 2025, Temasek and its subsidiary, True Light Capital, acquired a minority stake in Italian luxury fashion brand Golden Goose.

=== Financial institutions ===
In December 2003, through its subsidiary Allamanda Investments, Temasek acquired a 5.2% stake in ICICI Bank of India, which increased to 8.3% by 2007. Temasek later reduced its shares in the company in 2010 to 5.9% and again by 1.4% in 2012. Also in 2003, Temasek led a consortium that acquired a 51% stake in Bank Danamon through its subsidiary Fullerton Financial Holdings. The holding was sold to Mitsubishi UFJ Financial Group in stages from 2017 onward.

In 2004, Temasek acquired a 4.5% stake in China Minsheng Bank for $110 million. The share was fully divested in 2009. In 2005 the fund invested over $1 billion in China Construction Bank and acquired a 10% share for $3.1 billion in Bank of China, followed by a further $500 million investment during the initial public offering of the bank. Large divestments from both banks were made in 2011 and 2012.

Between February and July 2005, Temasek acquired a 72.6% stake in NIB Bank through its subsidiary Bugis Investments. NIB subsequently purchased Pakistan's PICIC Group in 2007 for $300 million and merged both groups. In 2017, NIB was merged into MCB Bank, giving Temasek a 5.49% interest. Temasek also bought a 15.4% stake in Malaysian Plantations Berhad, the then parent company of Alliance Bank Malaysia, for $124.5 million in 2005.

In 2006, Temasek acquired a 11.55% stake in Standard Chartered from the estate of Khoo Teck Puat, which was increased to 18% by December 2007. The fund invested a total of $5.9 million in Merril Lynch between December 2007 and July 2008. Following the acquisition of the bank by Bank of America, Temasek sold its stake by March 2009.

In 2014, the fund increased its shares in AIA Group to over 3.5% and its stake in the H-shares in the Industrial and Commercial Bank of China to 8.9%. Temasek also participated in a $250 million funding round for Dutch payments company Adyen in 2014 and purchased a minority interest in Virtu Financial, a United States-based market maker and broker-dealer in December 2014.

In 2018, Temasek participated in a $14 billion funding round in Ant Financial. In the same year, the fund invested, together with PayPal, $125 million in Pine Labs, an Indian payments company.

Temasek and Warburg Pincus acquired the Specialist Risk Group, a United Kingdom insurance intermediary and broker, for over £1 billion in September 2024.

In 2021, Temasek invested in cryptocurrency exchange FTX. Following FTX's collapse in November 2022, Temasek wrote down the value of their $275 million investment in FTX to zero. In February 2022, Temasek led a $200 million fundraising round for a Singaporean cryptocurrency financing company, Amber Group. In December 2024, Temasek announced its establishment of a private credit entity whose initial portfolio amounted to $7.5 billion, which considered direct investments and credit funds.

== Sustainability ==
In 2024, the company launched its inaugural sustainability report, stating that portfolio emissions were cut by 22 per cent for the financial year. Their sustainability-aligned investments accounted for 12 per cent of their net portfolio value and stood at $44 billion.

== See also ==
- Government of Singapore Investment Corporation (GIC)
- Reserves of the Government of Singapore
