= MedAccred =

US medical device accreditation program

MedAccred is an accreditation program for critical process manufacturing operations in the production of medical devices MedAccred is an industry managed program with the medical device industry having responsibility for all decisions regarding program operations, development, and the decision to award accreditations. The MedAccred program is administered on behalf of the medical device industry by the Performance Review Institute (PRI), a not-for-profit affiliate of SAE International. Participants in the MedAccred program consist of medical device OEMs, contract manufacturers and suppliers who work together to develop industry-wide audit criteria and provide accreditation of critical manufacturing process suppliers to improve product quality.

== History ==
MedAccred was created following a medical device industry roundtable in held in Chicago, IL in December 2012. Companies present at the roundtable included Abbot Laboratories, Baxter International, Beckman Coulter, Boston Scientific, Brunk Industries, DePuy Synthes, GE Healthcare, Medtronic, Paragon Medical, Philips, Stryker Corporation, Symmetry Medical, Terumo Cardiovascular Systems and Zimmer Biomet. Proof of concept audits based on the Nadcap program audit criteria were conducted in 2013. Briefings on the MedAccred program were held with the FDA Center for Devices and Radiological Health’s (CDRH) Office of Compliance and the FDA’s Office of Global Operations within the Office of the Commissioner. The initial subscribing companies were Johnson & Johnson, Philips and Stryker Corporation. By 2018, the list of subscribing companies had grown to include Baxter, Boston Scientific and Medtronic, in addition to the initial subscribing companies.

In 2014, the initial technical Task Groups were created in the critical process areas of Electronics – PCBAs, Electronics – Cable and Wire Harness, Heat Treating, Sterilization and Welding. The Plastics Task Group and Process Validation sub-team were created in 2015. By 2018, the list of critical process areas had grown to include Plastics - Extrusion, Plastics - Injection Molding, Plastics - Mechanical Assembly, Electronics - Printed Boards (Bare Boards), and Sterile Device Packaging as well.

The US FDA subsequently recognized the Aerospace Heat Treating Standard AMS 2750, which is published by SAE International and used by MedAccred.

Accreditations have since been granted to companies in Mexico, Costa Rica, China, United Kingdom, France, Romania, Austria and Malaysia as well.

MedAccred was added to the AdvaMed Resource Center, Case for Quality Library in August 2015 and has since been noted in a number of industry publications as being a significant activity for the medical devices industry. The US Federal Government has been supportive of the MedAccred program, investing in the preparedness of the supply chain for the MedAccred audit and accreditation process and setting up the MedMMAP (Medical Manufacturers MedAccred Accreditation Pathway) to support this effort.
