= Zwick Roell Group =

German materials testing systems company

- Industry: Materials and component testing
- Founded: 1920
- Headquarters: Ulm, Germany
- Website: https://www.zwickroell.com/

The ZwickRoell Group is a manufacturer of static testing machines and systems for materials and components testing used to evaluate the mechanical and physical properties and performance of materials and components. Core static tests carried out with this equipment includes tensile, compression, flexure (also referred to as bend), and cycling.

The company operates in 56 countries, has manufacturing facilities in Germany, UK and China, and strategic headquarters in the US and Singapore.

As of 2014 the Group employs 1250 staff in its international operations. It generates revenues of approximately 210 million euros.

Zwick manufactures a range of testing systems for research and routine testing of materials and components. It has developed materials testing software, digital contact and non contact extensometry and pioneered robotic materials testing systems.

== History ==
Roell & Korthaus have been involved in materials testing since 1920. Zwick began building machines and instruments for mechanical materials testing in 1937. The company founded by Professor Seger in 1876 evolved into the present-day concern Toni Techni. Roell and Korthouse, along with Toni Technik, have been part of the Zwick Roell Group since 1992.

In July 2001 the group become a corporation under the name of Zwick Roell AG, incorporating Zwick, Toni Technik and Indentec Ltd. Acmel Labo, the French manufacturer of laboratory instruments for the cement, lime and plaster industry, has been part of the group since May 2002. Zwick/Roell AG acquired the German company GTM in 2007 and Messphysik of Austria in 2006. In 2014 ZwickRoell opened its new factory in Taicang, China, some 50 km north-west of Shanghai. Here, on a site totaling around 2,000 m^{2}, testing machines and instruments will be developed and assembled for the Chinese and world markets.

== Group Partners ==
- Toni Technik Baustoffprüfsysteme GmbH: Operates in the building materials testing industry.
- ZwickRoell Testing Systems GmbH: Zwick Roell AG has held a 100% stake in ZwickRoell Testing Systems GmbH (formerly Messphysik Materials Testing GmbH) since 2006. This Austrian-based company develops optical strain measurement devices, creep testing machines as well as high temperature testing systems.
- Indentec Hardness Testing Machines Limited: Established in 1976, Indentec manufactures Vickers, Rockwell, Brinell and Universal hardness testing machines.
- UK Calibrations Limited: UK Calibrations Limited are based in the UK Midlands and provide Service and Calibration for all hardness testing machines.
- Sercal Calibrations and Service: Sercal Calibrations and Service are based in Leominster and provide Service and Calibration for materials testing machines.
- Asmec GmbH: Zwick Roell Group took over Asmec in 2011. Suppliers of materials and component testing systems ASMEC GmbH are based in Radeberg, Germany.
- ACMEL Labo: a member of the Zwick/Roell Group since 2002, it develops a range of devices for testing cement and mortar.
- GTM Testing and Metrology GmbH: A manufacturer of load cells, torque transducers and multi-component transducers.
- System Services Ltd: Servohydraulic training and support specialising in full turnkey project management.

== Types of mechanical tests carried out on Zwick Roell testing systems ==
- Tensile
- Compression
- Flexure
- Charpy impact test
- Izod impact strength test
