= Exova =

Scottish laboratory-based testing company

Exova Group Limited
- Company type: Limited company
- Industry: Materials testing
- Founded: 2008
- Defunct: 2019
- Fate: Acquired by Element Materials Technology
- Headquarters: Edinburgh, Scotland
- Key people: Paul Barry (Interim CEO)
- Revenue: £328.5m (2016)
- Operating income: £43.5 million (2016)
- Net income: £(28.7) million (2016)
- Number of employees: 6,200 (2017)
- Parent: Element Materials Technology
- Website: www.exova.com

Exova Group plc was a laboratory-based testing company, operating primarily within the testing segment of the Testing Inspection and Certification (“TIC”) sector. It was listed on the London Stock Exchange until it was acquired by Element Materials Technology in June 2017.

== History ==
The Exova brand was established in 2008, following a carve-out transaction from Bodycote, by funds managed by the private equity company Clayton, Dubilier & Rice for £417m in 2008. Exova was subsequently listed on the main London Stock Exchange on 16 April 2014 and entered the FTSE 250 in June 2014. In July 2014 the company acquired Metallurgical Services Private, an Indian testing services firm. In May 2015 Exova also acquired BM TRADA, the international provider of certification schemes and building products testing services.

Element Materials Technology announced a bid to acquire the company in April 2017. The transaction completed on 30 June 2017.

The British media reported in July 2017 that Exova had produced reports that allowed combustible cladding to be fitted to tall buildings "arguing fires involving combustible aluminium panels would behave similarly to ones with non-combustible ceramic tiles." At the Grenfell Tower Inquiry, expert witness Dr Barbara Lane criticised Exova’s attitude towards residents with mobility issues, as well as its inability to respond correctly to key questions during the Grenfell refurbishment. Dr Lane said Exova’s advice was inadequate on the project and its 2012 report lacked detail on how those with mobility issues could escape. She reminded the inquiry of the views of Exova’s former principal fire engineer Dr Clare Barker, who ‘did not consider’ these people and that ‘if they did have mobility issues then maybe Grenfell Tower wasn’t the best place for them to live’. During the Inquiry, it was established that Exova was appointed to provide fire safety advice to Kensington and Chelsea TMO before the lead contractor was appointed to the refurbishment in March 2014 and before the cladding had been chosen. The company was not appointed by the contractor to advise on the later stages of the refurbishment.

== Operations ==
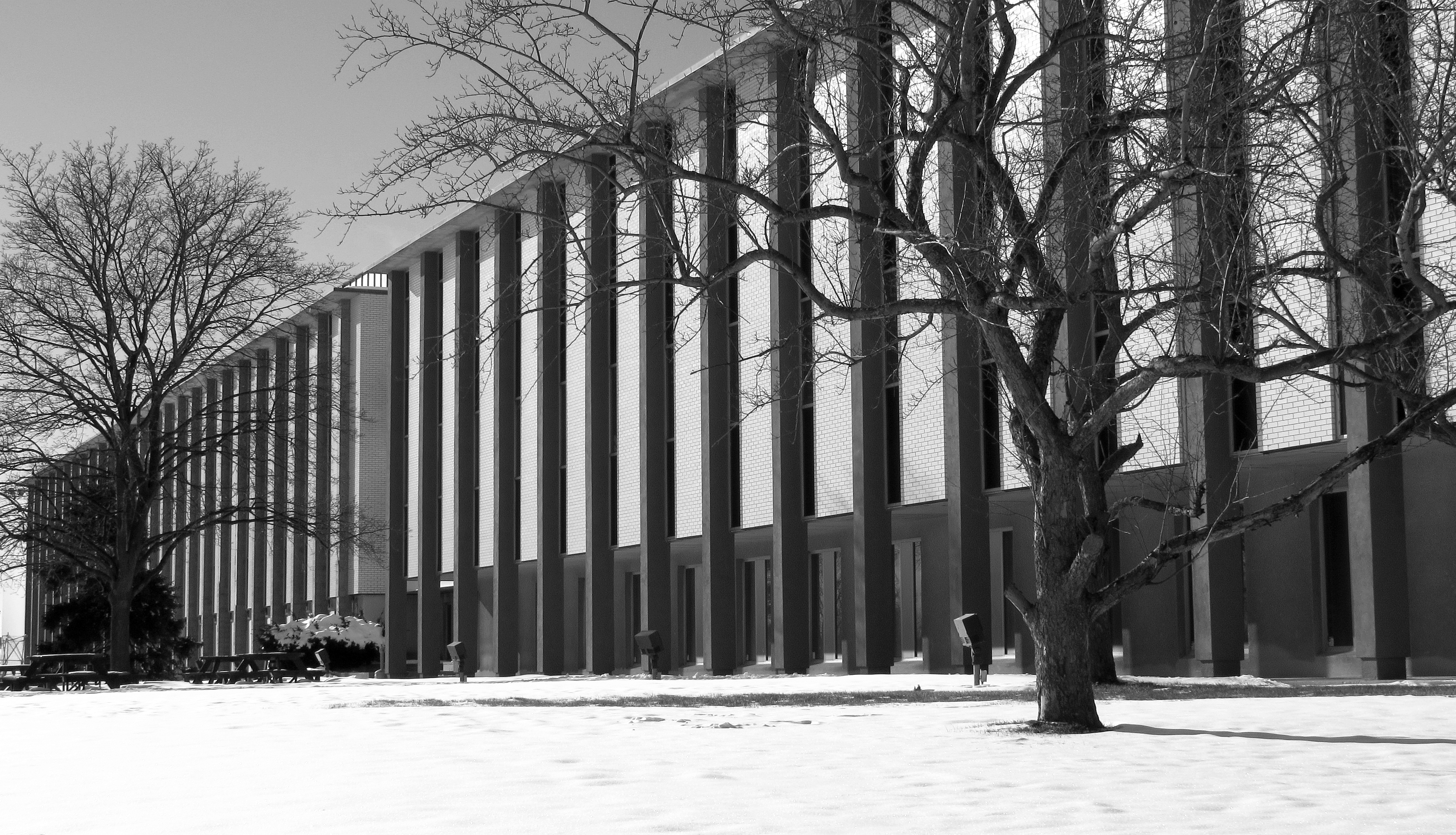
Exova Pharma, Mississauga, Ontario, Canada

Exova was headquartered in Edinburgh, UK. Exova employed 4,500 people in 121 laboratories in 32 countries worldwide. The Group tested materials, components, products and systems to ensure compliance with safety, performance and quality standards. The company specialised in testing across a number of sectors including health sciences, aerospace, transportation, oil and gas, fire and construction.

Exova services included calibration, chemistry and microbiology, corrosion and protection, fire, metal technology, polymers and composites, and structures and systems. Exova operated in different sectors under a number of brands, including:

- Exova Warringtonfire
- Exova Metech
- Warrington Certification
- Exova Catalyst
- Exova RPC
- Exova Metallurgical Services
- Exova BM Trada
