= List of materials-testing resources =

Materials testing is used to assess product quality, functionality, safety, reliability and toxicity of both materials and electronic devices. Some applications of materials testing include defect detection, failure analysis, material development, basic materials science research, and the verification of material properties for application trials. This is a list of organizations and companies that publish materials testing standards or offer materials testing laboratory services.

== International organizations ==
These organizations create materials testing standards or conduct active research in the fields of materials analysis and reliability testing.

- American Association of Textile Chemists and Colorists (AATCC)
- American National Standards Institute (ANSI)
- American Society of Heating, Refrigerating and Air-Conditioning Engineers (ASHRAE)
- American Society of Mechanical Engineers (ASME)
- ASTM International
- Federal Institute for Materials Research and Testing (German: Bundesanstalt für Materialforschung und -prüfung (BAM))
- Instron
- International Organization for Standardization (ISO)
- MTS Systems Corporation
- Nadcap
- National Physical Laboratory (United Kingdom)
- Society of Automotive Engineers (SAE)
- Zwick Roell Group

== Global research laboratories ==
These organizations provide materials testing laboratory services.

- FEI Company
- Lucideon
- SEMATECH

== See also ==
- Characterization (materials science)
- List of materials analysis methods
