= Country Delight =

Milk and grocery delivery company in India

- Type: Private
- Founded: 2015; 11 years ago
- Founders: Chakradhar Gade; Nitin Kaushal
- Headquarters: Gurugram
- Area served: India
- Key people: Chakradhar Gade - CEO
- Services: Fruits, vegetables, milk and grocery delivery
- Revenue: ▲₹1,380 crore (US$150 million) (FY24)
- Number of employees: 2051 (January 2023)
- Website: countrydelight.in

Country Delight is an Indian online milk and grocery delivery platform. Founded in 2015 by Chakradhar Gade and Nitin Kaushal.

== History ==
Country Delight is a direct-to-home consumer brand in India, specializing in delivering natural food essentials directly to consumers' doorsteps. Founded in 2015 it by IIM Indore graduates Chakradhar Gade and Nitin Kaushal. They presently operate in over 25 cities and 11 states. Country Delight provides dairy, fruits, vegetables, and other kitchen essentials with an integrated supply chain model. The company sources its products from trusted partners and delivers minimally processed, quality tested essentials within just few hours of sourcing. Since its inception, the company has reached an approximate revenue of ₹1380 crores in FY24 and has 2-3% shares in the milk segment.

== Operation ==
Operating on a subscription basis, Country Delight claims in its 2022 Forbes report that its 6,000 delivery workers fulfill more than 5 million orders a month and reach more than 30,000 homes. It has expanded its product line beyond milk, which still makes up a significant portion of the company's sales, to include items such as ghee, paneer, pulses, oils, yogurt and healthy smoothies. According to Gade, the company has started supplying fresh produce to the Delhi-NCR, Bengaluru, Hyderabad, Chennai and Mumbai market. It also intends to expand into other product categories, including jams, pickles, beans and spices. Country Delight operates with a full-stack supply chain model and utilizes traceability and process monitoring technology. The company has real-time monitoring of its entire supply chain. Their Milk-Testing kit developed in collaboration with DRDO (Defence Research & Development Organisation) is a first-of-its-kind home kit to test milk purity.

== Quality concerns ==
In April 2025, independent testing platform Trustified published a report on Country Delight Desi Danedar Ghee that indicated 0.015 mg/kg of Novaluron, which was higher than the FSSAI Contaminants Regulations limit of 0.01 mg/kg.
