= Nadcap =

Global accreditation program

Nadcap (formerly NADCAP, the National Aerospace and Defense Contractors Accreditation Program) is a global cooperative accreditation program for aerospace engineering, defense and related industries.

== History of Nadcap ==
The Nadcap program is administered by the Performance Review Institute (PRI). Nadcap was established in 1990 by SAE International. Nadcap's membership consists of "prime contractors" who coordinate with aerospace accredited suppliers to develop industry-wide audit criteria for special processes and products. Through PRI, Nadcap provides independent certification of manufacturing processes for the industry. PRI has its headquarters in Warrendale, Pennsylvania with branch offices for Nadcap located in London, Beijing, and Nagoya.

== Fields of Nadcap activities ==
The Nadcap program provides accreditation for special processes in the aerospace and defense industry.

These include:

- Aerospace Quality Systems (AQS)
- Aero Structure Assembly (ASA)
- Aernnova Mexico
- Chemical Processing (CP)
- Coatings (CT)
- Composites (COMP)
- Conventional Machining as a Special Process (CMSP)
- Elastomer Seals (SEAL)
- Electronics (ETG)
- Fluids Distribution (FLU)
- Heat Treating (HT)
- Materials Testing Laboratories (MTL)
- Measurement & Inspection (M&I)
- Metallic Materials Manufacturing (MMM)
- Nonconventional Machining and Surface Enhancement (NMSE)
- Nondestructive Testing (NDT)
- Non Metallic Materials Manufacturing (NMMM)
- Non Metallic Materials Testing (NMMT)
- Sealants (SLT)
- Welding (WLD)

== The Nadcap program and industry ==
PRI schedules an audit and assigns an industry approved auditor who will conduct the audit using an industry agreed checklist. At the end of the audit, any non-conformity issues will be raised through a non-conformance report. PRI will administer and close out the non-conformance reports with the Supplier. Upon completion PRI will present the audit pack to a 'special process Task Group’ made up of members from industry who will review it and vote on its acceptability for approval.

The Nadcap subscribers include:

- 309th Maintenance Wing-Hill AFB
- Aerojet Rocketdyne
- Airbus Group - Airbus
- Airbus Group - Airbus Defence and Space
- Airbus Group - Airbus Helicopters
- Airbus Group - Premium AEROTEC GmbH
- Airbus Group - Stelia Aerospace
- Air Force
- BAE Systems Military Air Information (MAI)
- BAE Systems
- The Boeing Company
- Bombardier Inc.
- COMAC
- Defense Contract Management Agency (DCMA)
- Eaton, Aerospace Group
- Embraer S.A.
- GARDNER AEROSPACE Group
- GE Aviation
- GE Aviation - GE Avio S.r.l.
- General Dynamics - Gulfstream
- GKN Aerospace
- GKN Aerospace Sweden AB
- Harris Corporation
- Heroux-Devtek Landing Gear Division Inc.
- Honeywell Aerospace
- Howmet Aerospace
- Israel Aerospace Industries
- Latécoère
- Leonardo S.p.A. Divisione Velivoli
- Leonardo S.p.A. – Helicopter Division
- Liebherr-Aerospace SAS
- Lockheed Martin Corporation
- Lockheed Martin - Sikorsky Aircraft
- Mitsubishi Aircraft Corporation
- Mitsubishi Heavy Industries LTD
- MTU Aero Engines AG
- NASA
- Northrop Grumman Corporation
- Parker Aerospace Group
- Raytheon Company
- Raytheon Technologies - Goodrich
- Raytheon Technologies - Collins Aerospace (Hamilton Sundstrand)
- Raytheon Technologies - Pratt & Whitney
- Raytheon Technologies - Pratt & Whitney Canada
- Raytheon Technologies - Collins Aerospace (Rockwell Collins)
- Rolls-Royce
- SAFRAN Group
- Singapore Technologies Aerospace
- Sonaca
- Spirit AeroSystems
- Swift Engineering
- Textron Inc. - Textron Aviation
- Textron Inc. - Bell Helicopter
- Thales Group
- Triumph Group Inc.
- Zodiac Aerospace (SAFRAN)

== Nadcap Meetings ==
Nadcap meetings are held several times a year in different locations worldwide. For example, the 2017 meetings were held in New Orleans, LA, USA in February, Berlin (Germany) in June; and Pittsburgh (Pennsylvania). During these meetings there are open Task Group meetings and other workshops (with participation of Primes, Suppliers, and PRI staff). These meetings are used to discuss the program development and changes to audit criteria among other topics. Agendas and minutes are posted on the PRI website.

== Nadcap Training ==
During the Nadcap meetings, training classes are provided on different topics such as:

- Root Cause Corrective Action - RCCA
- Special processes, such as, NDT, chemical processing, etc.
- Internal auditing
- AS/EN/JISQ 9100
- Problem Solving Tools
- Nadcap Audit Preparation – Chemical Processing
- Nadcap Audit Preparation – Heat Treating
- Nadcap Audit Preparation – Metallic Material Testing Laboratories
- Nadcap Audit Preparation – Non-Destructive Testing
- Nadcap Audit Preparation – Welding
