= Pimpaka Towira =

Thai independent film director, screenwriter and film producer

Pimpaka Towira (Thai: พิมพกา โตวิระ) is a Thai independent film director, screenwriter and film producer. Her films include One Night Husband, The Truth Be Told: The Cases Against Supinya Klangnarong and The Island Funeral.

== Career ==
Pimpaka Towira studied film at Thammasat University. After graduating, she worked on one film production, but, in her words, "found it disappointing and dropped out". She went to work as a film critic and writer for The Nation newspaper in Bangkok, and was programming director for 2001 Bangkok Film Festival, which was sponsored by The Nation.

She also made experimental short films. Among her early works was a short called Mae Nak (1997), a deconstruction of the Mae Nak Phra Khanong ghost legend.

Her feature film debut came in 2003 with One Night Husband, a romantic-thriller film that she co-wrote with Prabda Yoon and Laddawan Ratanadilokchai. Co-produced by Mingmongkol Sonakul, the film starred Nicole Theriault and Siriyakorn Pukkavesh. It premiered at the Berlin International Film Festival, and was screened at several other film festivals.

In 2005, Pimpaka was featured in Worldly Desires, portraying a film director in a short film by Apichatpong Weerasethakul. The film was commissioned as part of the Digital Short Films by Three Directors project of the Jeonju International Film Festival.

Meanwhile, Pimpaka had started on her next feature, a documentary on Supinya Klangnarong, profiling the Thai media activist and her legal fight against defamation lawsuits brought against her by the Shin Corporation, at the time owned by the family of Prime Minister Thaksin Shinawatra. Filmed over the course of nearly three years, The Truth Be Told: The Cases Against Supinya Klangnarong covers the political scene in Thailand in the last days of the Thaksin administration, the controversial sale of his family's assets to Singapore's Temasek Holdings, demonstrations against Thaksin, the 2006 Thai coup d'état and the post-coup atmosphere.

The film premiered in September 2007 during the Digital Forum in Bangkok.

Also in 2007, she directed a series of short films for the Free Thai Cinema Movement, which featured interviews with Thai film directors and artists opposed to censorship of films by the government.

In 2010, her short film, My Father, won the Special Jury Award at International Film Festival of Asian-Pacific countries in Vladivostok, after which she made three acclaimed shorts, Terribly Happy (2010), Mother (2012) and Prelude To The General (2016)

Her second feature, The Island Funeral (2015), won the Best Asian Future Film Award at Tokyo International Film Festival 2015, FIPRESCI Award at the Hong Kong International Film Festival 2016 and received the Silver Hanoman Award at Jogja-NETPAC Asian Film Festival 2016

== See also ==
- Women's cinema
