= Economic consequences of the 2006 Thai coup d'état =

The 2006 Thailand coup d'état took place on Tuesday 19 September 2006, when the Royal Thai Army staged a coup against the government of Prime Minister Thaksin Shinawatra. The short-term economic consequences were relatively minor, resulting in stock fluctuations and possible credit rating changes. However, long-term economic consequences of the military government included several radical policy changes, including a drive to a self-sufficiency economy and economic protectionism.

== Day 1 (Wednesday) ==
=== Stock Exchange ===
The nation's stock exchange, government departments, banks and schools were ordered to close on Sept. 20 in the wake of a coup, according to a statement broadcast on Thai television. The Thai stock exchange will be closed, and it is "following the situation," said Ladawan Kantawong, a spokeswoman. She earlier said it would open today. Trading of Thai bonds in Bangkok was also suspended, according to the Thai Bond Market Association. Military leaders later said all would reopen tomorrow. It was the first time the exchange shuttered operations for a day other than a holiday since the terror attacks in the U.S. on Sept. 12, 2001.

Shares of mutual funds that invest in Thailand led declines in the region's U.S.-traded stocks after the military seized control of Bangkok and Prime Minister Thaksin Shinawatra declared a state of emergency. Both Thai Fund Inc., Inc. and Thai Capital Fund Inc. had their biggest losses in more than two months. The Bank of New York Co.'s Asia ADR Index, which tracks the region's American depositary receipts, dropped 1.1 percent to 139.15 in New York.

Thai Fund Inc., a closed-end fund managed by Morgan Stanley, fell 3.8 percent to $8.65 after tumbling as much as 7.1 percent earlier, the steepest drop since July 17. Thai Capital Fund, another closed-end fund run by SCB Asset Management Co., slumped 4.4 percent to $9.70 for its largest decline since May 17. It's a provoking speculation on how Thailand's stock market would react. Shin Corporation's ADRs, each of which represents four ordinary shares, was unchanged at $3.15 as 4,000 shares changed hands. The ADRs of Advanced Info Service Pcl, a unit of Shin, fell 2 cents to $2.45 with 300 shares changing hands. Each Advanced Info ADR represents one ordinary share.

"We will see some selling pressure in the next few days," Marc Faber, founder and managing director of Marc Faber Ltd., said from Chiang Mai, Thailand. "The implications are obviously not overtly favorable because it creates a lot of uncertainty."

World Stock Exchange

Dow Jones Industrial Average and Nasdaq composite trimmed losses by the close Tuesday after a tough session hurt by discouraging comments from Yahoo! and revived worries about the economy following a big drop in housing starts. Also pressuring markets: An apparent coup attempt in Thailand that led that country's prime minister to declare a state of emergency and prepare to abruptly leave a United Nations summit in New York. Thailand is an economic cornerstone of Southeast Asia.

Asian stocks fell by the most in more than a week after the military seized power in Thailand. Honda Motor Co. and SingTel paced declines among companies with investments in the country. The Morgan Stanley Capital International Asia Pacific Index dropped 1.2 percent to 126.49 at 7:03 p.m. in Tokyo, its biggest slide since Sept. 11. All 10 industry groups declined.

Tokyo's Nikkei 225 average fell 1.12 percent by midday on Wednesday, after hitting a one-month low, The market took news of a military coup in Thailand in its stride and also as a profit warning from Yahoo hit Internet stocks. The Nikkei was down 177.78 points at 15,696.50 after falling as low as 15,666.04, its lowest intraday since Aug. 14. "The political uncertainty affects the sentiment for the region as a whole," said Teo Chon Kiat, who helps oversee $1.4 billion at DBS Asset Management in Singapore. Asian economies are so "inter-related" and the political instability "may affect liquidity flow to the region."

Southeast Asian stocks opened lower after Thai armed forces seized control of Bangkok in a coup, but falls were capped by strong economies and the view that political uncertainties in Thailand are unlikely to spread across borders. The main Singapore stock index was down nearly 1 percent in early trade, while Malaysian shares were off 0.2 percent. Philippine shares, which rose to near 5-month highs on Tuesday, opened 0.5 percent down."You get a knee-jerk reaction, which is to sell, but I would be very surprised if the Thai problem spreads to other countries in the region," Malcolm Wood, regional strategist at Morgan Stanley in Hong Kong, told Reuters. "The fundamentals for regional economies and markets look pretty solid to us."

Honda, Japan's No. 3 automaker, lost 0.8 percent to 3,830 yen. The Tokyo-based company, which has two factories in Thailand, would not operate its auto plant there for today's day shift, said spokeswoman Yuriko Yabe. Its motorcycle unit would operate normally. Nissan, Japan's second-largest automaker, lost 0.6 percent to 1,311 yen. The company closed its two factories in Thailand today following "advice" from the Thai government, according to spokeswoman Mihoko Takeda.

SingTel, Southeast Asia's largest phone company, lost 1.7 percent to S$2.38. It owns about a fifth of Advanced Info Service Pcl, Thailand's biggest mobile-phone operator. Thai Beverages, the nation's biggest brewer, declined 1.7 percent to 28.5 Singapore cents in Singapore trading. Hutchison Telecommunications International Ltd., which has a stake in a mobile-phone venture in Thailand, fell 2.1 percent to HK$12.92.

Travel-related stocks declined on concern tourists may be deterred from visiting Thailand. AirAsia Bhd., Southeast Asia's biggest discount airline, fell 0.6 percent to 1.55 ringgit. The company owns a 49 percent stake in Thai AirAsia Co. Singapore Airlines, the world's No. 2 carrier by market value, lost 0.7 percent to S$14.60. Singapore Air and its SilkAir unit operate 71 flights a week to destinations in Thailand. "Budget airlines may be more affected," said DBS Asset Management's Teo Chon Kiat. "Tourists will try to avoid the country as a destination. Tourism makes up quite a substantial portion of the economy."

Hana Tour Service Inc., the No. 1 South Korean travel company by sales, dropped 2 percent to 63,900 won. One in 10 South Korean holiday makers going abroad went to Thailand in 2005, according to Mirae Asset Securities Co. Singapore-based Banyan Tree Holdings, an operator of luxury hotels that owns properties in Bangkok and Phuket, dropped 2.8 percent to 85.5 Singapore cents.

=== Currency ===
The Thai baht encountered its largest loss in almost three years after the military seized control of Bangkok and Prime Minister Thaksin Shinawatra declared a state of emergency, sparking a broad decline in a number of Asian currencies.

The baht fell 1.3 percent to 37.77 per dollar at 5:06 p.m. in New York, from 37.29 late on Sept. 18, the biggest decline since Oct. 14, 2003. The baht trimmed losses after falling by as much as 1.8 percent on speculation King Bhumibol Adulyadej will resolve the crisis. The baht is still up 8.5 percent against the dollar this year, beating the Indonesian rupiah for the biggest advance among 15 Asian currencies tracked by Bloomberg, as record exports spurred a trade surplus.

"The baht will come under more pressure," said Marios Maratheftis, a currency strategist at Standard Chartered Plc in London. "There's been an immediate reaction and people will move to the sidelines to see how it all unfolds, but what we'll see will probably be a short-term disruption," said Upadhyaya, currency analyst at Putnam Investments in Boston.

The yen retained most of the day's gains against the euro after a European official said markets had yet to digest policy-makers' remarks calling for the yen to rise against the euro. But the Japanese currency eased around half a yen from session highs against the dollar after the Thai news, tracking a sharp decline in the baht. Developments in Thailand overshadowed U.S. data earlier that showed a surprisingly large fall in housing starts and the rate of wholesale inflation that weighed on the dollar. The dollar had edged lower against the yen before the news of the Thai emergency and ended at ¥117.59, down from the previous session.

Some strategists viewed the move as a simple knee-jerk reaction, as the more-liquid Japanese currency sometimes trades as a proxy for less flexible Asian currencies. "The yen was swept up in by a bit of guilt by association. It's the most liquid Asian currency, and clearly the coup did halt the negative momentum in dollar-yen, which fell sharply after the inflation and housing numbers," said Upadhyaya.

Emerging currencies

Emerging Asian currencies were hit harder. Against the Singapore dollar, the U.S. currency was up 0.3 percent at 1.5906 Singapore dollars and against the Philippine peso, the dollar was up 0.1 percent at 50.030 pesos. Some other emerging market currencies fell, including the Brazilian real, which lost 0.8 percent, and the Indonesian rupiah, which dropped 0.6 percent.

Looking ahead, the market will watch to see whether the Thai crisis prompts investors to abandon other risky emerging market trades. In 1997, the currency's devaluation set off collapses in bonds and stocks from South Korea to Indonesia.and then grew into an international economic slowdown. The Asian financial crisis last decade was triggered in part because of the economies' dependence on short-term private capital from overseas, which poured into the region throughout the 1990s. Capital suddenly fled those countries, causing their currencies to plunge and making it harder for the countries to repay their foreign debt. As international investors shunned short-term government bonds, Russia could no longer finance its budget and defaulted on $40 billion of debt in August 1998.

Investors said the coup is unlikely to trigger another financial crisis in the region. "The situation is very different than it was in 1997 and 1998, when you had large current account deficits in the region and large vulnerability because of borrowing," said Michael Mussa, the International Monetary Fund's research director in 1997 and 1998 who is now an economist at the Institute for International Economics in Washington. "It is a purely domestic political event and when the smoke clears, it may be a good time to buy," said Kevin Hebner, global investment strategist at Greenwich, Connecticut-based Third Wave Global Investors LLC, which manages over $400 million.

Bonds

The perceived risk of owning bonds based on Thailand's debt rose today, according to data compiled by Credit Derivatives Research LLC. The cost of buying credit-default swaps based on Thailand's bonds jumped as high as $75,000 from $36,000 yesterday, said Tim Backshall, a strategist at Credit Derivatives Research in Walnut Creek, California. The price was $54,000 this afternoon, he said. Credit- default swaps are financial instruments based on bonds and loans that are used to speculate on an increase or decrease in indebtedness. The contracts pay an investor $10 million in the event of a default during the next five years. Yield premiums on Thailand's 7.75 percent bond due in April 2007 compared with benchmark Treasuries rose 2 basis points to 60 basis points, the highest in a month, HSBC prices show.

"We don't have financial contagion of the irrational type anymore," said Jerome Booth, who helps manage $23 billion in emerging market debt at Ashmore Investment Management in London. "Emerging markets are dominated now by long institutional investors like pension funds and there is no massive short squeezing where problems occur." "It's going to be quite localized," said James Barrineau, an asset manager at Alliance Bernstein in New York who helps manage $9 billion in emerging market bonds.

== Day 2 (Thursday) ==
=== Stock Exchange ===
Thai stocks fell to two-month lows before recovering in the first day of trading since a military coup ousted Prime Minister Thaksin Shinawatra. Shares of Shin Corp., linked to Thaksin, and its units declined. The SET Index dropped 9.99, or 1.4 percent, to 692.57 at the 4:30 p.m. close in Bangkok. The SET Index fell 29.64 points, or 4.2% to 702.63 in the first minutes of trading Thursday to its lowest intraday level since July 21. But quickly bounced back, suggesting the coup would do no greater damage. After the previous coup, in February 1991, the SET Index tumbled 7.3% on the first day of trading before rallying 24% in the next two months.

About six stocks fell for every one that rose at the exchange, with 43 billion baht ($1.1 billion) changing hands. That was the most since 51 billion baht in shares traded on April 5, the day after Thaksin said he would step down to end a political crisis. The SET rose 3.1 percent that day.

"The initial reaction was kind of a knee-jerk reaction," said Adithep Vanabriksha, who helps manage $1.6 billion at Aberdeen Asset Management Co. in Bangkok. "Coups aren't viewed positively in the first instance, at least. Still, we wouldn't recommend investors sell. Valuations are still quite cheap."

Shin Corporation, which owns Thailand's largest mobile-phone operator, fell 1.75 baht, or 5.7 percent, to 29.25. Thaksin's family sold its stake in the company to a group of investors led by Singapore's state-run Temasek Holdings Pte. The family didn't pay tax on the $1.9 billion deal, sparking protests and a political crisis that culminated in this week's coup. Shin's Advanced Info Service Pcl unit, which is the country's biggest mobile-phone operator, lost 2.50 baht, or 2.7 percent, to 90.50. Shin Satellite Pcl, the country's only satellite operator, plunged 1.20 baht, or 13 percent, to 7.85. ITV Pcl, a television network operator controlled by Shin, tumbled 0.46 baht, or 13 percent, to 2.98.

"It's a knee-jerk reaction," said Patipat Pattaphongse, director of research at KGI Securities (Thailand) Pcl in Bangkok. "People still tend to affiliate Thaksin with Shin but he's out of the loop. The sell-off is a little misguided."

PTT Pcl, the country's biggest publicly traded company and its largest energy provider, fell 6 baht, or 2.8 percent, to 212. PTT Exploration & Production Pcl, the second-biggest listed company and its largest explorer, dropped 2 baht, or 1.9 percent, to 105. The two stocks accounted for 33 percent of the SET's decline.

Siam Cement Pcl, the country's biggest cement and petrochemical company, rose 2 baht, or 0.8 percent, to 244, after losing up to 2.5 percent in early trading.Bangkok Bank Pcl, the No. 1 lender by assets, added 1 baht, or 0.9 percent, to 114, after falling as much 2.7 percent. Banks as a group gained 0.8 percent, one of two industry indexes advancing within the SET.

Elsewhere Italian-Thai Development Pcl, the No. 1 construction company, tumbled 0.95 baht, or 14 percent, to 6. Bangkok Metro Pcl, operator of the capital's subway, plunged 0.06 baht, or 4.6 percent, to 1.25. The stock was the first to debut after the coup. The company earlier this month raised 3.6 billion baht in its initial public offering.

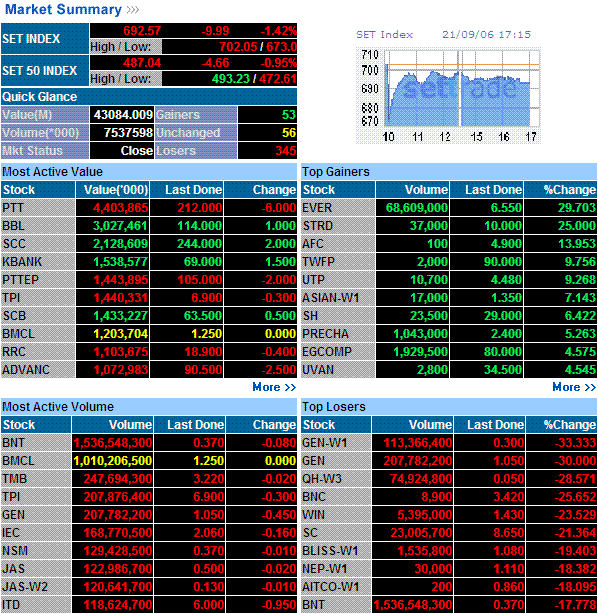

Buying opportunity

Further declines may be limited because the coup helped resolve a political deadlock, analysts said. The end of the stalemate will enable an interim government to quickly draft a new government budget, central bank Governor Pridiyathorn Devakula said.

"Political volatility, including coups, are nothing new for Thailand," Merrill Lynch & Co.'s strategists Spencer White, Willie Chan and Stephen A. Corry said in a note to investors dated yesterday. "This time investors should be encouraged by the fact that the uncertainty surrounding Thaksin's tenure has been removed." Merrill Lynch kept its "overweight" rating on Thai stocks.

Threadneedle Investments, a London-based money manager owned by American Express Co. that oversees more than 70.4 billion pounds ($133 billion) of assets, said it may add Thai stocks. "Without the removal of Thaksin, the instability could have dragged on for a long time and there could have been an escalation in protests and violence," said Maxine Cuffe, an emerging markets fund manager at the group. "Ideally, the military will transfer power quickly."

"This provides a tactical buying opportunity," Christopher Wood, global equities strategist at CLSA Ltd. in Jakarta, wrote in a report published yesterday. Wood recommended investors buy more Thai stocks and suggested the coup will help resolve a political standoff that hurt the economy. "The key point for the stock market is that the months-long stalemate had to be broken," he wrote. "The political impasse was clearly impacting both business and consumer confidence."

"If prices come down substantially, we would be buyers." Mark Mobius, who oversees about $30 billion in emerging market equities at Templeton Asset Management, said in an interview from Shanghai."We're not that concerned because we've seen this before" In a written note this morning, Mobius said "We remain of the view that the long-term outlook for Thailand is good." He said if prices drop, he would look to buy shares in bank, natural resource and real estate companies.

Ian Beattie, who oversees more than $1 billion in Asian equities at New Star Asset Management Ltd. in London, said the coup is "good news" as long as the next developments are peaceful. "From a purely monetary point of view, it's good news," Beattie said. "It's removed the sort of impasse that Thailand reached politically."

"Some of the short-term investors may take this opportunity to exit," said Hiroshi Yoh, who helps oversee $500 million at Tokio Marine Asset Management International Pte. in Singapore. "But we, as a long-term investor, we are going to stay. We're not going to panic sell Thai stocks."

Michael Kurtz, a strategist at Bear Stearns Asia Ltd. in Hong Kong, took a more optimistic view. He upgraded Thailand to "overweight," calling for a greater investment than indicated by benchmarks. "The latest developments in Thailand set up a net reduction in political uncertainty and could speed a resumption of decisive governance that boosts already sagging business and consumer confidence," Relatively low valuations also justify investing in the country, he wrote. The Thai measure is valued at 10.7 times estimated earnings, the lowest among indexes for 14 regional markets tracked by Bloomberg. he wrote in a report.

"The best case is that the army succeeds in its goal to stabilize politics, we get a reasonable and responsible interim government, elections that finally end this crazy political impasse we've had through 2006, and investors can enjoy predictable and rational policy making," John Green, head of Asia practice at Eurasia Group in New York, said in an interview. Leading Assets' Depew also said it may be time to buy. "I would not be surprised to see the market move higher in coming months," he said. "Valuations are already reflecting a lot of negative news."

Foreign institutions, with JPM leading, were net buyers of 7,393 million baht ($200 million) on this day, while local institutions and retail investors were net sellers.

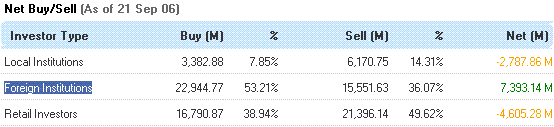

=== Currency ===
Thailand's baht rebounded from its biggest loss in three years as investors bet this week's coup will break a political deadlock that has stalled public works spending. The currency rose the most in more than eight months after army chief Sondhi Boonyarataklin took power without bloodshed and pledged to hold elections in October 2007. Parliament has been suspended since February amid an election dispute, blocking 1.7 trillion baht ($45 billion) in spending on roads, bridges and power plants. The baht rose 1 percent to 37.38 per dollar at 2:30 p.m. in Bangkok, after yesterday dropping 1.3 percent, the biggest loss since October 2003.

"This represents a buying opportunity as it removes the political roadblock from the economy," said Richard Yetsenga, a currency strategist at HSBC Holdings Plc in Hong Kong. "The coup is as calm as you could possibly expect." HSBC expects the currency to reach 37 by year-end, Yetsenga said.

"Political uncertainty was one of the main things that prevented people from going into the Thai market," said Uwe Parpart, head of fixed income and currency research for Asia at Cantor Fitzgerald in Hong Kong. "With that removed, it certainly is a buying opportunity." The baht may rise beyond 37.20 in a few days, he said.

The coup in Thailand is unlikely to affect markets like in 1997, said Malaysian central bank Governor Zeti Akhtar Aziz. The devaluation of the baht in 1997 triggered a collapse in currencies and stock markets across the region, resulting in the Asian financial crisis.

According to Bandid Nijathaworn, a deputy central bank governor of the Bank of Thailand, the baht and financial markets suffered limited impacts from the coup. The baht was volatile last Tuesday night and Wednesday in offshore trade but stabilised within normal trading ranges late. Dr Bandid said foreign investors had remained confident in the country's economic fundamentals in the medium and long terms, and in the reasonable price level of Thai stocks.

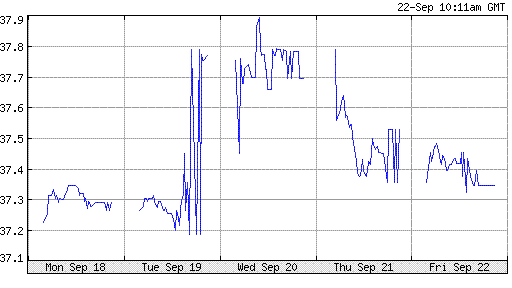

== National and international trade and business ==
The coup's impact on negotiations for a US-Thailand Free Trade Agreement (FTA) with the United States are not immediately clear, but Washington still hopes to secure a pact when democracy is restored, a top US trade official said yesterday.US Trade Representative Susan Schwab said "Formal negotiations were suspended pending the elections that had been anticipated later this year and we had assumed that the formal negotiations would resume in December". Controversy surrounding the bilateral trade talks with the US may have contributed to the downfall of the government of Thaksin Shinawatra.

Robert Collins, managing director of the UK-based property agency Savills (Thailand) Ltd. said that foreign buyers will have more confidence in a solid economy in Thailand in the aftermath of the coup.

== Credit ratings ==
Thailand's bond ratings are currently unchanged, but credit rating agencies have announced that they may downgrade them depending on future developments.

Standard & Poor's Ratings Services said that it would place its 'BBB+' long-term foreign, 'A' long-term local, 'A2' short-term foreign, and 'A1' short-term local currency sovereign credit ratings for Thailand on CreditWatch, which reflected the possibility of sustained deterioration in national credit worthiness. A S&P analyst noted that "A fairly rapid return to civilian rule in accordance with the country's constitution and renewed commitment to macroeconomic stability and needed reform likely would lead to the affirmation of existing ratings."

Fitch Ratings put its sovereign credit ratings for Thailand on Rating Watch Negative, but noted that the coup might have a positive effect if it leads to a resolution of the country's long running political crisis.

Moody's Investors Service has reaffirmed Thailand's ratings and stable outlook two days after a military coup, saying the country's fundamentals were strong enough to weather the instability. "The country's financial and external payments positions should be strong enough to withstand temporary disturbances caused by Tuesday's military coup," Moody's said. None of Moody's ratings or guidelines for Thailand were changed, including the Baa1 foreign and local currency ratings of the government, the A3 foreign currency ceiling for bonds, and the Baa1 foreign currency ceiling for bank deposits.

== See also ==
- Economy of Thailand
- Stock Exchange of Thailand
- Thai baht
