= Sarath Ratanavadi =

Thai engineer and businessman

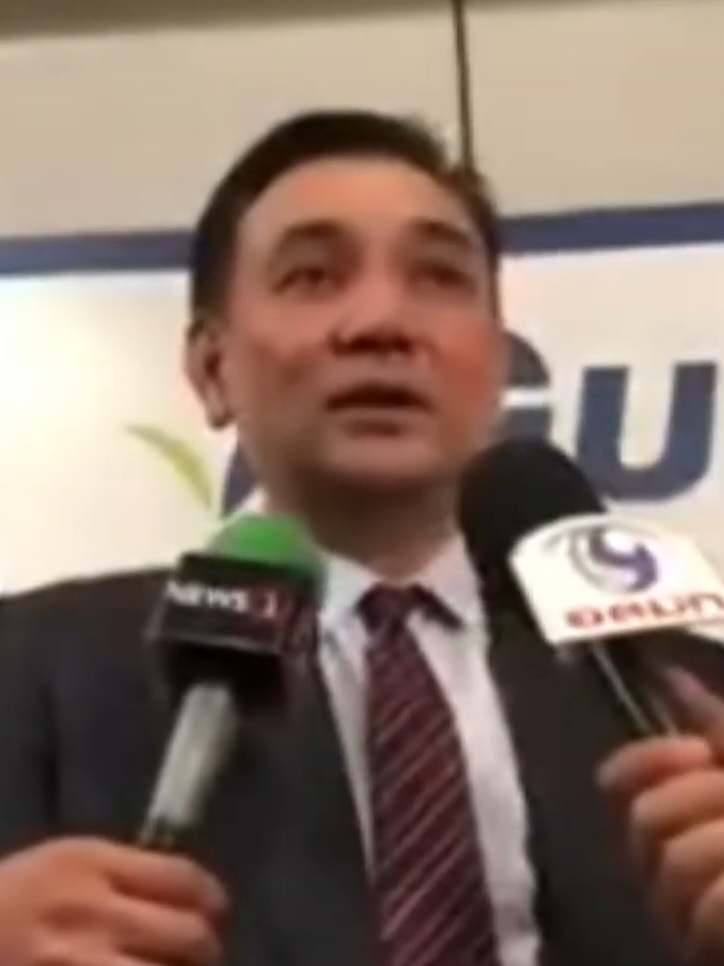
- Born: 12 July 1965 (age 60); Thailand
- Education: Chulalongkorn University, University of Southern California
- Occupations: Businessman; engineer; investor; philanthropist
- Years active: 1994–present
- Known for: Leadership of Gulf Energy Development

Sarath Ratanavadi (Thai: สารัชถ์ รัตนาวะดี, RTGS: Sarat Rattanawadee) is a Thai engineer and billionaire businessman who is the founder and chief executive officer of Gulf Development, which operates in sectors such as power generation, telecommunications, and digital infrastructure. He is often referred to as Thailand's "energy king".

As of 2026, Ratanavadi's net worth was estimated at around US$16 billion.

== Early life and education ==
Sarath Ratanavadi was born in Bangkok on July 12, 1965, into a military family. His father, General Thavorn Ratanavadi, served as chief of staff of the Royal Thai Armed Forces, and his grandfather, Sod, was a member of the 1932 People’s Party revolutionary movement.

Ratanavadi attended Vajiravudh College for his secondary education and went on to study engineering at Chulalongkorn University, where he received a bachelor’s degree in civil engineering. He later obtained a Master of Science in Engineering management from the University of Southern California (USC) in the United States.

== Career ==
In 1994, Ratanavadi founded Gulf Electric Company Limited as his first venture in Thailand’s newly liberalizing power sector. Over the next decade, he expanded Gulf Electric by establishing several affiliated power companies, founding Gulf Power Generation and Gulf Cogeneration in 1996, Gulf Yala Green in 1997, and Gulf IPP in 2004. These companies were later merged to create Gulf Energy Development Company Limited in 2007 as the holding company. During his tenure, the Gulf group grew into one of Thailand’s major independent power producers, with power plants across Thailand and Southeast Asia reaching a combined capacity of over 12,000 MW by the 2020s.

From 2008 to 2016, Ratanavadi served as chairman of the NIST International School’s executive board. He subsequently became chairman of NIST’s governing foundation board, overseeing the institute’s endowment and development.

In 2017, Ratanavadi took Gulf Energy Development public on the Stock Exchange of Thailand, raising over 25 billion baht in the country’s biggest initial public offering in a decade. In the following years, he pursued diversification beyond conventional energy. In 2021, Gulf acquired a stake in Intouch Holdings and its mobile telecom subsidiary, Advanced Info Service (AIS). Later, Gulf formed a joint venture with Singtel to develop data centers in Thailand, and in early 2022 Gulf and Binance launched a cryptocurrency trading platform in Thailand.

In 2022, Ratanavadi opened Stonehill, a private golf club in Thailand. The course spans more than 340 acres and was designed by the well-known golf course architect Kyle Phillips.

In 2025, Ratanavadi merged Gulf Energy Development with Intouch Holdings to form Gulf Development, valued at $25 billion. That same year, Gulf expanded its operations into finance and acquired a stake in Kasikornbank, the third-largest bank of Thailand.

== Philanthropy ==
Ratanavadi has supported numerous charitable initiatives in healthcare and community development. In 2015, he donated $3 million to the USC golf program. Following the donation, his son was admitted to the university as a walk-on golfer, prompting donor-influence and conflicts-of-interest investigation. Ratanavadi also serves on USC’s Board of Councilors of the Annenberg School for Communication and Journalism.

== Personal life ==
Sarath Ratanavadi is married to Nalinee Tantisoonthorn. The couple have two sons, Saris and Sitamon Ratanavadi. He resides primarily in Bangkok.

== Recognition ==
In February 2021, he was awarded the Knight Grand Cross (First class) of the Order of the Crown of Thailand.

In 2025, Ratanavadi was recognized by Bangkok Post in its CEO of the Year 2025 feature as "CEO of the Year: Industrial Growth Pioneer".

== See also ==
- Gulf Development
