= Gulf Development =

Thai energy and infrastructure holding company

- Logo used since 2024
- Trade name: GULF
- Native name: บริษัท กัลฟ์ ดีเวลลอปเมนท์ จำกัด (มหาชน)
- Formerly: Gulf Energy Development Public Company Limited (2011–2024)
- Company type: Public
- Traded as: SET: GULF
- ISIN: TH8319010006
- Industry: Conglomerate
- Predecessor: Gulf Energy Development Public Company Limited
- Founded: August 19, 2011; 14 years ago
- Founder: Sarath Ratanavadi
- Headquarters: 87 M Thai Tower Building, All Seasons Place, Bangkok, Thailand
- Area served: Thailand, Vietnam, United States, United Kingdom
- Key people: Sarath Ratanavadi (CEO)
- Products: Electricity, natural gas, renewable energy
- Services: Telecommunications, cloud computing, crypto exchange
- Divisions: Energy; Infrastructure; Digital
- Subsidiaries: Gulf Energy Generation; Gulf MP; Jackson Generation; Outer Dowsing Wind Farm; Advanced Info Service; Thaicom; Gulf Edge; Gulf Binance
- Website: gulf.co.th

Gulf Development Public Company Limited (Thai: กัลฟ์ ดีเวลลอปเมนท์) is a holding company based in Bangkok, Thailand. It owns businesses that operate in electricity generation, telecommunications, and infrastructure development.

== History ==
Gulf Energy Development was founded on August 19, 2011, by Sarath Ratanavadi to consolidate the power generation operations of Gulf Electric Co. and Gulf Holdings Co. It initially focused on developing independent power producer projects in partnership with foreign companies.

In 2017, Gulf was listed on the Stock Exchange of Thailand (SET). The initial public offering raised approximately THB 24 billion (US$736 million).

In 2021, Gulf acquired a controlling interest in Intouch Holdings PCL, the parent company of Advanced Info Service (AIS).

In 2022, Gulf expanded into the United States and acquired a 49% stake in Jackson Generation, a gas-fired power plant in Illinois, for approximately US$409 million. A year later, in 2023, Gulf formed a joint venture with Binance to establish a digital asset exchange.

In July 2024, Gulf Energy Development announced a merger with its subsidiary Intouch Holdings and was renamed as Gulf Development Public Company Limited.

In August 2025, Gulf filed a 300-million-baht defamation lawsuit against People’s Party leader Natthaphong Ruengpanyawut and MPs Woraphop Viriyaroj and Supachot Chaiyasat, following their criticism of government energy procurement transparency and petitions to the National Anti-Corruption Commission (NACC) to investigate state energy purchases.

== Operations ==
Gulf Development's primary business is power generation and operates natural gas-fired and renewable energy plants in Thailand, Vietnam, the United States, and the United Kingdom. As of 2025, its total domestic and international capacity exceeded 23 GW, with assets including solar farms in Thailand and wind power projects in Vietnam and the North Sea.

In the telecommunications sector, Gulf Development holds a stake in AIS and a controlling interest in Thaicom Plc, a satellite operator. Its infrastructure division has formed multiple public-private partnerships, including the expansion of the Laem Chabang and Map Ta Phut ports, the development of an LNG import terminal, and the operation of intercity motorways. Additionally, Gulf Development provides digital services through its subsidiary Gulf Edge, which provides sovereign cloud services in partnership with Google and develops data centers.

== Subsidiaries and investments ==
Major subsidiaries and affiliates include:

- Gulf Energy Generation: Oversees power generation assets, including joint ventures with J-Power and Mitsui & Co.
- Gulf MP Co. / Gulf TP: Operates small power producer plants.
- Jackson Generation LLC (USA): A 49% stake in a gas-fired power plant in Illinois.
- Outer Dowsing Wind Farm Ltd. (UK): A 24.99% stake in an offshore wind project.
- Advanced Info Service (AIS): An affiliate mobile network operator (approx. 40.4% stake).
- Thaicom PCL: A satellite service provider (approx. 40% stake).
- Gulf Edge Ltd.: Focuses on cloud computing and data centers.
- Gulf Binance: A joint venture operating a digital asset exchange.
- Gulf Innova: Focuses on digital investments and emerging technologies.
