= 2005–2006 Thai political crisis =

2005-06 period of political and civil unrest in Thailand culminating in a military coup

In 2005 and 2006, a series of events occurred in Thailand as a result of public anger with Prime Minister Thaksin Shinawatra, who was opposed by Sondhi Limthongkul and his coalitions. These events culminated in a September 2006 military coup that overthrew the Thai Rak Thai government. This led to Thaksin's departure from Thailand and the establishment of a military government led by Surayud Chulanont, who was closely associated with senior statesman Prem Tinsulanonda.

The crisis, resulting coup, and post-coup military government called into question issues of media freedom, the role of the Constitution in breaking a political deadlock, and the existence of political stability in Thailand. It also reflected the long-term and significant disparity between urban and rural political orientation, abuses of power, and conflicts of interest within democratically elected leaders, issues that have long plagued the Thai political landscape.

Sondhi Limthongkul, a media mogul who was previously a staunch supporter of Thaksin, played a leading role in the crisis through the establishment of the anti-Thaksin People's Alliance for Democracy (PAD). The PAD aligned itself with several state-enterprise unions (who were against Thaksin's privatisation plans for state enterprises), human rights and civil politics activists who charged Thaksin's rule as "undemocratic", monopoly of power, human rights abuse, suppressing the freedom of press and extrajudicial killings of drug traffickers, a main concern among several human right groups.

Key anti-Thaksin coalitions also expressed support for the controversial monk Ajahn Maha Bua. These groups opposed the Thaksin government's decision to appoint Somdet Phra Buddhacharya as acting Supreme Patriarch while Somdet Phra Yanasangworn was critically ill, and accused the government of improperly interfering in monastic affairs.

Significant supporters of the PAD included prominent socialists, scholars, and "royalists" (who claimed that Thaksin frequently insulted King Bhumibol Adulyadej), various factions in the Thai military (who claimed that Thaksin promoted only those who were loyal to him), and various civil groups, who criticised Thaksin for not paying taxes during the sale of Shin Corporation to Temasek Holdings, although the capital gains from the transaction were legally exempt from taxation. The movement was seen highly controversial and complicated.

In February 2006, Thaksin dissolved Parliament and called a general legislative election for the House of Representatives in April 2006. Most major opposition parties boycotted the election, led by the Democrat Party. After the elections, King Bhumibol requested that the courts resolve the crisis. Soon afterwards, the Constitutional Court invalidated the elections based on the positioning of voting booths, and the Criminal Court later jailed members of the Election Commission that did not obey the Court's request to resign.

New elections were scheduled for 15 October 2006. This time, the opposition announced it was contesting the election, and numerous newly founded parties actively campaigned. The election was canceled following the military coup on September 19, 2006, which occurred while Thaksin was attending a United Nations summit in New York. Thaksin has since been in exile. The PAD dissolved itself 2 days after the coup, after announcing that their goal had been accomplished. Since then (February 2008), the PAD has vowed to resume protests if pro-Thaksin practices and policies of the Samak government were to become evident.

Apparently, critiques on Thaksin Shinawatra took place even before the Sondhi's movement. Severe critiques occurred around the Thaksin case of hidden assets, filed to the Constitutional Court. Thaksin escaped a guilty verdict with an 8-7 judicial vote.

Human rights abuses were also the cause of criticism. Thaksin's war on drugs became controversial when thousands of killings and murder cases were explained by the authority as "extrajudicial" and "revenge" on drug traffickers.

Besides the removal and a threat on Sondhi's program, freedom of the press became the focus. Sutthichai Yoon, another major critic, was filed a case against. In early 2006, the supporters of Thaksin Shinawatra, claiming to be supported by the premier himself and his close figures, blockaded the entry of the Nation Group building, threatening to "burn" the building. Possibly the movement rallied by Sondhi, then became the focus of several anti-Thaksin groups.

== Origins of the crisis ==
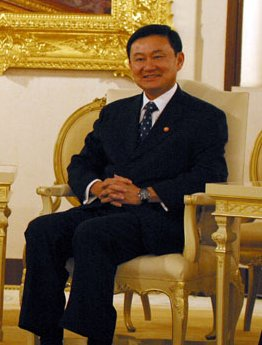
Thaksin Shinawatra

=== Context ===
Prime Minister Thaksin Shinawatra was embroiled in several controversies after assuming power following the 2001 election. These controversies included alleged conflicts of interest due to his family's holdings in the Shin Corporation and a violent crackdown on drug dealers. None of these controversies significantly impacted his popularity; he became the first elected prime minister to serve a full term and was re-elected in January 2005

=== Viroj Nualkhair controversy ===
The origins of the crisis can be traced to the controversy surrounding Viroj Nualkhair, CEO of state-owned Krung Thai Bank (KTB). Viroj faced pressure to leave his position after KTB reported higher than expected levels of non-performing loans in 2004. Viroj was vigorously defended by Sondhi Limthongkul, a media tycoon who had previously been a staunch Thaksin supporter. As KTB CEO, Viroj had forgiven Sondhi's personal debts by 1.6 billion baht and arranged for further rounds of debt forgiveness. When Viroj was forced out of his position, Sondhi's public criticism of Thaksin started to increase.

=== The conflict escalates ===
The Sondhi-Thaksin conflict escalated when Sondhi's Channel 11/1 was temporarily ordered to stop broadcasting due to a contract dispute between cable operator UBC and the government regulator.

In September 2005, Sondhi made several on-air references to King Bhumibol Adulyadej that were characterized as disrespectful by the government and royalists. Among these references was a claim that the government's 2004 appointment of Somdet Phra Buddhacharya as acting Supreme Patriarch in place of the critically ill Somdet Phra Yanasangworn contravened the prerogative of the king. According to Thai ecclesiastic law, the Supreme Patriarch is nominated by the Sangha Supreme Council and formally appointed by the King. Somdet Phra Phuthacharn's appointment was vehemently opposed by Luang Ta Maha Bua, an influential monk with close affiliations to Sondhi. After discussions with the King's principal private secretary, Arsa Sarasin, MCOT executive, removed the program.

=== The Judiciary under the 1997 Constitution ===
The Administrative and Constitutional Courts (the first in Thai history) were based on the French and Italian judicial systems, where the judge has direct authority and supervises the investigation into the facts of the case. This is in contrast to the civil and criminal justice systems in Thailand and most other countries, where the role of a judge is to examine the case based solely on the arguments of the prosecution and defense attorneys. The administrative court was set up to resolve complaints against misconduct, neglect, or outright abuse by bureaucratic and government agencies; the constitutional court, on the other hand, was set up to resolve conflicts regarding unconstitutional legislation.

The drafters of the 1997 Constitution, one of the most "democratic" constitutions, were quite farsighted by putting in a mechanism to resolve abuses and misconduct by people in authority. The Constitutional Court was not initially seen as important, and few anticipated that the nature of potential conflicts in legislation could be critical. As a result, more experienced judges did not see any prestige in taking a position within that judiciary.

Their oversight became glaring when Thaksin's 1st Asset Concealment case was brought to the Constitutional Court. His TRT party had just won the popular vote by a historic majority, but he had not completely disclosed his assets as required by the law. A false asset disclosure would normally disqualify someone from taking up any political post for five years, but Thaksin pleaded that it was just a clerical error. The judges voted narrowly, by a 7–8 margin, allowing Thaksin to take up the office of Prime Minister. Thaksin himself claimed that people had overwhelmingly voted for his party and his that wealth was diversified across many assets, and that the clerical error could probably be an "honest mistake".

== Luang Ta Maha Bua incident ==
On 27 September 2005, Manager Daily published a sermon by Luang Ta Maha Bua, a popular but controversial monk. Luang Ta Maha Bua, a former Thaksin supporter, delivered a sermon that was highly critical of the Prime Minister. The issue was controversial, in large part because it came from a monk who was one of Thailand's most revered temple abbots (who are above criticism in Buddhist Thailand) and who had organised several huge donations of solid gold to the Thai Treasury after the previous financial crisis. Especially controversial were the following quotes:

"They complained to me about PM Thaksin and Mr. Visanu and two other people that I don't remember. This is the big ogre [Thai: ตัวยักษ์ใหญ่], big power. Atrocious power will swallow our country, bite liver and lungs and aim for the presidency....He will put a torch to the country. He will never listen....This savagery and atrocity appear in every aspect of him.... All he has are things to be used for burning."

"He is clearly aiming for the presidency now. The monarch trampled, the religion trampled, the country trampled, by this savage and atrocious power in a few people in the government circle. That is the circle of ogres, of ghosts, of trolls, of demons [Thai:ยักษ์วงผีวงเปรตวงมาร], all in there....So even Devadatta saw the harm he caused, and he was rewarded for his good deed. He would attain Buddhahood [Thai:พระปัจเจกพุทธเจ้า]. For those who have made mistakes, if we see the harm we cause, we can still get by. But what is it with Thailand? What kind of governance?"

"They even dare to accuse Luangta Maha Bua of playing politics. Politics, dog shit [Thai:การบ้านการเมืองขี้หมาอะไร]. There's only shit all over the country. I brought Buddha's dharma to cleanse in order for them to repent and recognise good and evil. Because they're the government. The world flatters them as smart people, but don't be smart down the toilet [Thai:แต่อย่าฉลาดลงส้วมลงถาน]. Don't be smart about putting a torch to the head of everyone in the country, from Nation, Religion, and Monarchy on down. These guys will get burned unless they recognise the truth. I'm saddened by all this. How does this come about?"

On 11 October 2005, Thaksin sued Manager Daily for THB 500 million. As monks have traditionally been above criticism, Thaksin did not sue Luang Ta Maha Bua. "This is an exercise of an individual's right to protect his reputation and privacy. The newspaper did not criticise the prime minister fairly as a public official, but rather it took him to task personally, using harsh words, which was damaging to him," Thana Benjathikul, Thaksin's lawyer, said.

Thaksin was immediately attacked by critics and accused of gagging the press. Manager Daily owner Sondhi Limthongkul's lawyer, Suwat Apaipakdi, claimed that "every newspaper reproduced his [Luang Ta Maha Bua] comments. Why did Thaksin not sue him [Luang Ta Maha Bua]? He chose to sue only the Manager Media Group because it's linked to Khun Sondhi". Thaksin's legal team noted that other newspapers only published selected passages of the sermon, and furthermore, that a slanderous headline was used. Respected civil rights lawyer Thongbai Thongpao noted that Thaksin's lawsuit did have merit. He added that the lawsuits "do not constitute an attack on freedom of the press".

As recently as 14 March 2006, Luang Ta Maha Bua has asked Thaksin to resign. In a sermon that the monk called the "most vehement since the temple was set up", he said it was time for Thaksin to abandon the "rotten system he is presiding over". He described the government as "wicked, corrupt, power-hungry and greedy".

== Temple of the Emerald Buddha incident ==
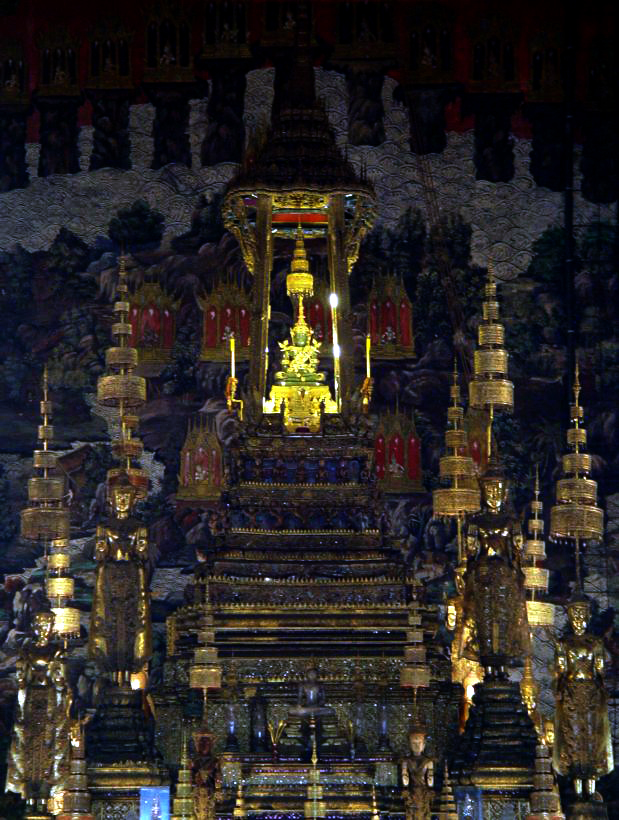
The Emerald Buddha

On 10 April 2005, Thaksin Shinawatra presided over a "secret" and "private" merit-making ceremony at the Temple of the Emerald Buddha, the holiest site in Thai Buddhism.

Starting October 2005, the website of the Phoochatkarn newspaper ran an article alleging that the Prime Minister had usurped the royal powers of the king by presiding over the ceremony. This blast, referring to a photo printed in The Nation Multimedia newspaper, led Sondhi Limthongkul, the owner of Phoochatkarn, to start using "We Love the King", "We Will Fight for the King", and "Return Power to the King" as his key anti-Thaksin rallying slogans. This allegation has been repeated in Sondhi's "Thailand Weekly" live tapings. It also became a staple of the Thailand-insider.com website of Akeyuth Anchanbutr, a notable critic of Thaksin. A widely circulated spam email showed a picture of Thaksin sitting on a chair normally used by the king and said, "People are familiar with images only of the King and members of the Royal Family, all dressed in royal uniforms and decorated with full regalia, presiding over grand ceremonies in the temple's main chapel. Yet this picture makes me think: What has happened to our country?".

On 9 November 2005, Cabinet secretary-general Bovornsak Uwanno claimed that King Bhumibol Adulyadej granted permission to Prime Minister Thaksin Shinawatra to preside over a grand merit-making ceremony. This was corroborated by Chaktham Thammasak, who was director-general of the Bureau of National Buddhism during the time of the incident. Chaktham claims that the Royal Household Bureau designed every aspect of the ceremony, including the positioning of the chairs.

On 17 November 2005, the Civil Court issued a gag order on Sondhi to prevent him from making further allegations. This immediately prompted academics and intellectuals to attack Thaksin and accuse him of restricting press freedom. In November 2005, General Kittisak Ratprasert, former chief aide-de-camp to King Bhumibol Adulyadej, filed a complaint at Phra Ratchawang police station alleging that Thaksin and his deputy Visanu Krue-ngarm committed lèse majesté at the Temple.

These charges have apparently been quietly dropped after King Bhumibol Adulyadej's birthday speech where he claimed he didn't take lèse majesté charges seriously. However, Sondhi still uses "We Will Fight for the King" and "Return Power to the King" as rallying cries in his anti-Thaksin protests.

== Phra Phrom Erawan Shrine incident ==
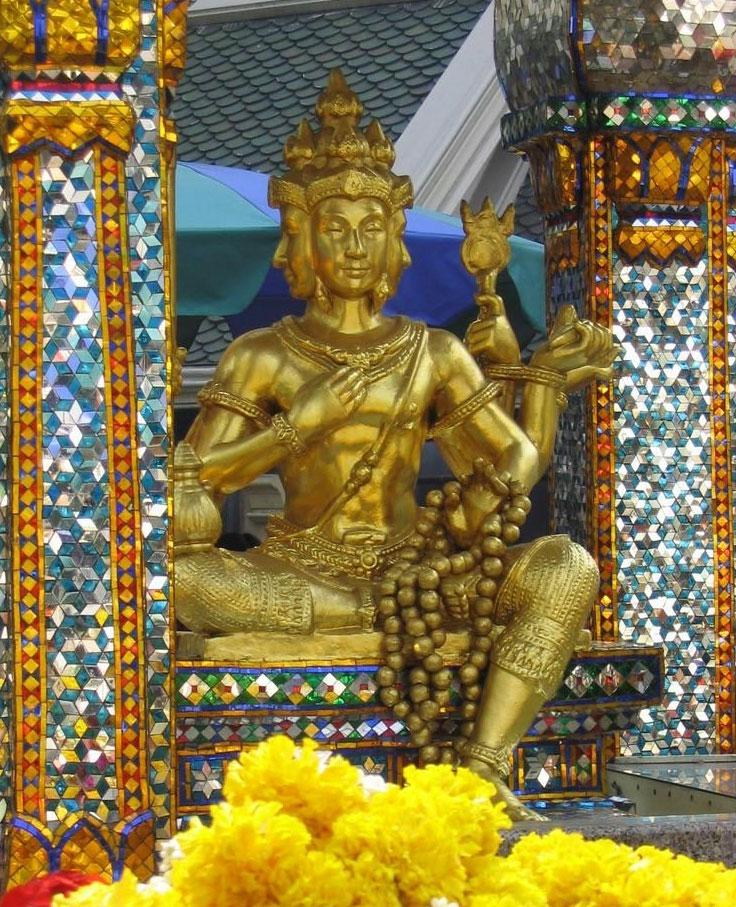
The Erawan shrine's Brahma (Phra Phrom) statue

In the early hours of 21 March 2006, Thanakorn Pakdeepol, 27, broke into the Phra Phrom Erawan Shrine in central Bangkok and attacked the statue of the god Brahma with a hammer. After destroying the statue, he was attacked and beaten to death by several people in the vicinity. Thanakorn Pakdeepol had a history of mental illness and depression. Thai police are still investigating the case, but it was complicated by the fact that the wrongdoer was beaten to death.

At an anti-Thaksin rally on 22 March, protest-leader Sondhi Limthongkul claimed that Thaksin Shinawatra masterminded the destruction of the idol to replace Brahma with a "dark force" aligned to Thaksin. Sondhi claimed that Thaksin hired Thanakorn through a Khmer black magic shaman. Sondhi also questioned "why was the man stomped to death after he smashed the statue? I have in-depth information about someone who is deeply obsessed with superstition [referring to Thaksin]. He wants to destroy Thao Maha Phrom so that he can rebuild it by himself and then bury "his stuff" in the statue. This is a way to avert ill omens."

The vandal's father, Sayant Pakdeepol, called Sondhi "the biggest liar I have ever seen". Thaksin called Sondhi's accusations "insane". To date, Sondhi has refused to make public any details about his "in-depth information" regarding his accusations.

== Personal attacks ==
Protesters made many personal attacks against Thaksin Shinawatra. It is debatable whether such attacks had any significant role in his downfall. Among them:

- Senator Karoon Sai-ngam of Buriram Province told women to pass photos of Thaksin between their legs and curse Thaksin three times to leave Thailand and flee to Singapore.
- Controversial social critic and winner of the Right Livelihood Award Sulak Sivaraksa claimed that Thaksin Shinawatra had committed adultery: "As for breaking the Third Precept, I don't have hard evidence. But there are lots of rumors that Thaksin and his cabinet ministers have engaged in many illicit sexual reveries—that Thaksin has been unfaithful to his wife. There is even a toddler who looks astonishingly like Thaksin. All these still cannot be proven. So we may have to give him the benefit of the doubt. But truths about Thaksin's notorious sexual life will surely surface after his fall from power—like those of the dictator Sarit Thanarat."

== $1.88 billion Shin Corporation transaction ==
On Monday, 23 of January 2006, three days after the Thai Telecommunication Act (2006) was passed on Friday, 20 of January, Thaksin's family sold all stake in the Shin Corporation, a leading communication company located in Thailand, to Temasek Holdings with tax liability exemption. The families of Thaksin and his wife netted about 73 billion baht (about US$1.88 billion) tax-free from the buyout, using a regulation that states that individuals (as opposed to corporations) who sell shares on the stock exchange pay no capital gains tax.

The Thailand Securities and Exchange Commission investigated the transaction. "The investigation concluded that Prime Minister Thaksin Shinawatra and his daughter Pinthongta are clear from all wrongdoing," said SEC secretary-general Thirachai Phuvanatnaranubala on 23 of February 2006. However, the SEC did find that Thaksin's son, Panthongtae, violated rules regarding information disclosure and public tender offers in transactions between 2000 and 2002. He was fined 6 million THB (about US$150,000). "The case is not severe because Panthongtae did inform the SEC but his report was not totally correct" said the SEC's deputy chief Prasong Vinaiphat.

Allegations of insider trading by the Shinawatras, executives, and major shareholders were also investigated. No irregularities were found. The military junta later reopened the investigations.

The transactions have made the Prime Minister the target of accusations that he was selling an asset of national importance to a foreign entity, and hence selling out his nation. The democrat party spokesman said that Thaksin was worse than Saddam Hussein for not protecting the Thai economy from foreigners: "Dictator Saddam, though a brutal tyrant, still fought the superpower for the Iraqi motherland". Supporters however, counter that Thailand's mobile phone industry is highly competitive, and that little criticism was raised when the Norwegian firm Telenor acquired Total Access Communication, the country's second largest operator. Democrat party leader Abhisit Vejjajiva had already criticised Thaksin earlier for not sufficiently opening up the Thai telecom sector to foreigners.

Supporters further counter that the complete sale of the Shin Corporation by the Shinawatra family has been a long-standing demand of some public groups, as it would allow Thaksin to undertake his duties as Prime Minister without any accusations of conflicts of interest.

== Anti-Thaksin and pro-Thaksin demonstrations ==
=== Genesis of the demonstrations ===
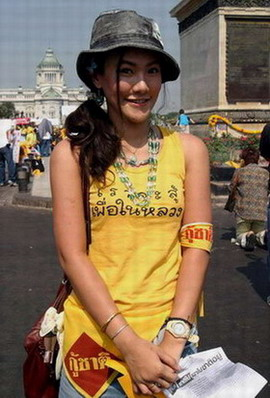
An anti-Thaksin protester wearing the anti-Thaksin slogan "Fight for the King." Her shirt is royal yellow, the official colour of the PAD.

The prime minister faced growing pressure to resign following the sale of his family's controlling stake in Shin Corporation to Temasek Holdings, the Singapore government's investment agency. Although the SEC's investigation of the transaction cleared Thaksin of all wrongdoing, critics have still accused him of insider trading, use of tax law loopholes, selling out the nation, and other offences.

Anti-Thaksin protesters are largely composed of urban upper/middle class royalist Bangkokians, dubbed the "Blue Blood Jet Set" by the Bangkok Post. They have been joined by supporters of the controversial Santi Asoke Buddhist sect, followers of the controversial monk Luang Ta Maha Bua, and state enterprises employees who oppose privatisation. Some academics and intellectuals have also joined the protests.

However, the protests have been divisive. Many urban upper/middle class Bangkokians have expressed frustration at the protesters. Early in 2005, a majority of the employees at state-owned Electricity Generating Authority of Thailand supported privatisation. The popular but controversial Dharmakaya Buddhist sect has come out in support of Thaksin. Several members of King Bhumibol Adulyadej's Privy Council have asked protesters to seek a peaceful resolution to the situation. Supreme Commander General Ruengroj Mahasaranond said "I should like to direct my message at a certain person who resorts to self-promotion by invoking the name of His Majesty...Rivals should not involve the monarch in their quarrels". Many academics have urged the protesters to adhere to the constitution and not pressure the king to appoint a replacement prime minister. Many also note that the majority of Thailand's population, particularly the rural poor, are strong supporters of Thaksin.

On 14 January 2006, hundreds of protestors headed by Sondhi Limthongkul, former senator Pratin Santiprapop, Klanarong Chantik, and Democrat MP Kalaya Sophonpanich stormed into Government House at half past midnight, overwhelming security forces. They occupied the building for twenty minutes before regrouping outside and continuing their protest.

An anti-Thaksin rally on 4 February 2006 at the Royal Plaza drew a very large crowd. Police and foreign media estimated the turnout to be 40,000 – 50,000. Some local newspapers estimated that up to 100,000 attended. Afterwards, protests waned, with fewer protesters showing up at the Royal Plaza the next weekend. Most Thai newspapers estimated the turnout at 30,000 – 50,000 people. Phoochatkarn Raiwan (owned by Sondhi Limthongkul, the leader of the protest) estimated an attendance of 100,000 people. The BBC, Reuters, and AFP estimated an attendance 5,000 – 15,000.

The PAD's protests took on an increasingly critical tone in February. In a single protest on 26 February 2006, Buddhist leader Sulak Sivaraksa called Thaksin a pitiful dog, and the chairman of the northeastern teachers' group, Auychai Watha, called for Thaksin's children to "become whores infected with venereal disease". The behaviour of the protesters was condemned by the Chairperson of Amnesty International Thailand. Protestors often harassed journalists and news crews.

=== Pro-Thaksin demonstrations ===
On 3 March 2006, a pro-Thaksin rally at Sanam Luang arranged by the TRT party was attended by a massive crowd. Local media reported that up to 200,000 people attended. Some foreign media reported up to 150,000 attended. In this rally, Thaksin promised that "If my party receive less votes than the number of people abstaining combined with votes for smaller parties, I will not accept the premiership...I beg the three opposition parties, Democrat, Chat Thai and Mahachon, to join the contest. If they really insist on a boycott, they can campaign for voters to mark "abstention" to reject me". He also promised to amend Article 313 of the Constitution to allow representatives of the people to draft a new charter, as had occurred in 1974 after the 1973 bloodshed. Some additional laws would be amended later, he said. The whole political reform would take about one year, before a referendum to endorse the new charter and another parliament dissolution before a new election. Anti-Thaksin protesters have claimed that most of the attendants were uneducated people who were paid to attend.

=== Demonstrations before the April election ===
On 5 March 2006, while Thaksin was campaigning for the April 2006 elections in the rural areas, tens of thousands of protesters in Bangkok, shouting "Thaksin Get Out" and "Restore Power to the King", demanded the resignation of the Prime Minister. The anti-Thaksin rally included the burning of an effigy of him in a mock funeral to cries of "Thaksin out! Thaksin out!" It was described as "the biggest anti-government demonstration in Thailand since 1992" in some news reports. The protest also included a satirical Chinese opera and performances of anti-Thaksin Lam tad singing.

Starting 13 March 2006, anti-Thaksin protests moved to permanent tents and stands outside Government House at the Miskawan Intersection, leading to massive traffic jams in that area. According to Thairath, by 5.30 pm on 18 March 2006, approximately 3,000 people were protesting at Government House.

On 18 March 2006, Nuansri Rodkhrut, a representative of the Thai Red Cross, met protest-leader Chamlong Srimuang to inform him that protest tents were in space reserved for the 2006 Red Cross Fair. She was roundly booed by protesters. The Red Cross Fair is held annually at the Royal Plaza, Amphorn Gardens, Sri Ayuthaya Road, and the Miskawan Intersection from the end of March to early April. The fair is hosted by the Thai Red Cross Society and was to be attended by Princess Sirindhorn.

Chamlong responded "The protest area does not belong to any individual. Our move from Sanam Luang to Government House to kick out PM Thaksin is our job. I have been to the Red Cross Fair since I was a kid, and I don't want to disrupt it. In fact, it is good that the protesters can visit the fair and raise its attendance. Few Fair attendees will visit the area used by the protesters." He suggested to Nuansri that the entrance booth of the Fair be moved 10 meters behind the main stage of the protests. Nuansri responded that she would seek further guidance from her superiors. On the same day, Traffic Police Commander Phanu Kerdlabphon warned that any disruption of Princess Sirindhorn's visit to the Fair would "surely lead to trouble". Chamlong was quoted as saying "If the officers consider it is against the law, then, come and arrest all 100,000 of us here".

Starting 15 March 2006, Thaksin supporters moved en-masse to Bangkok from the North and Northeast in a caravan of Ee Taen (slow-moving diesel-engine powered farming vehicles), Thai: อีแต๋น). The "Mob Ee Taen" (so called by the Thai press), as of 18 March 2006, numbered thousands of demonstrators in several hundred Ee Taen and had chosen Chatuchak Park, in the north of Bangkok, as its demonstration site.

The farmers were joined by 400 motorcycle taxi drivers, who claim that a Thaksin-initiated crackdown has eliminated the need to make payments to corrupt police and underworld elements.

On 19 March 2006, a group of Thaksin supporters burned a coffin of Apirak Kosayothin, Democrat governor of Bangkok, claiming that the Bangkok Metropolitan Administration was trying to force the protesters out of Chatuchak Park, that the BMA would not provide any water, and provided only two mobile toilet buses. Anti-Thaksin protesters have claimed that the Thaksin supporters are uneducated and had been paid to come support Thaksin. They have also claimed that it is illegal to drive Ee Taen on city streets.

In the week before the 2006 election, the anti-Thaksin rally moved to Bangkok's shopping districts, with rallies at Bumrungrad International Hospital, The Emporium, and Siam Square. Siam Centre, Siam Discovery, Siam Paragon, and many other businesses and office buildings in the protest area were closed, causing up to 1.2 billion baht in losses. On 29 March, the BTS Skytrain had to shut down service at the Siam intersection station, though the service also reported record ridership as a result of the protest rallies. The protests also caused major traffic jams throughout Bangkok, especially at Sukhumvit Road and Silom Road, both major Bangkok arteries. The local press estimated 50,000 protesters, although foreign press and independent observers noted only 5,000 – 30,000.

The anti-Thaksin protesters were harshly criticised, with 50,000 complaints being made to the FM91 traffic radio station. A poll showed that 71% of Bangkokians disagreed with the protests being moved into the city centre. An opinion poll showed that 26% of Bangkok people supported the resignation of Thaksin, compared to 48% three weeks previously. Protest leader Chamlong Srimuang defended the protesters, saying "Two days of traffic jams is a minor matter, but the nation remaining jammed up was a big problem."

== Planning for the coup ==
Planning for the coup started in approximately February 2006 and continued in secret during the subsequent crisis. Rumours about unrest in the armed forces and possible coup plots unfurled for months leading to the coup. In May 2006, General Sonthi Boonyaratglin issued assurances that the military would not seize power. On 20 July 2006, around one hundred middle-ranking army officers said to be supporters of Thaksin were reassigned by the army high command, fueling rumours that the army was divided between supporters and opponents of the prime minister.

In July 2006, 3rd Army Area Commander Saprang Kalayanamitr gave an interview where he stated that Thai politics were below standard and that the Kingdom's leadership was weak. He also claimed that Thailand had a false democracy. In August 2006, there were reports of tank movements near Bangkok, but the military attributed these to a scheduled exercise. In early September, Thai police arrested five army officers, all members of Thailand's counter-insurgency command, after intercepting one of the officers with a bomb in a car allegedly targeting the prime minister's residence. Three of the suspects were released after the coup.

In December 2006, former National Security Council head Prasong Soonsiri claimed that he and five other senior military figures had been planning a coup as early as July. He claimed that Sonthi was one of those figures, but that Surayud and Prem were not involved at the time.

== Impeachment attempts ==
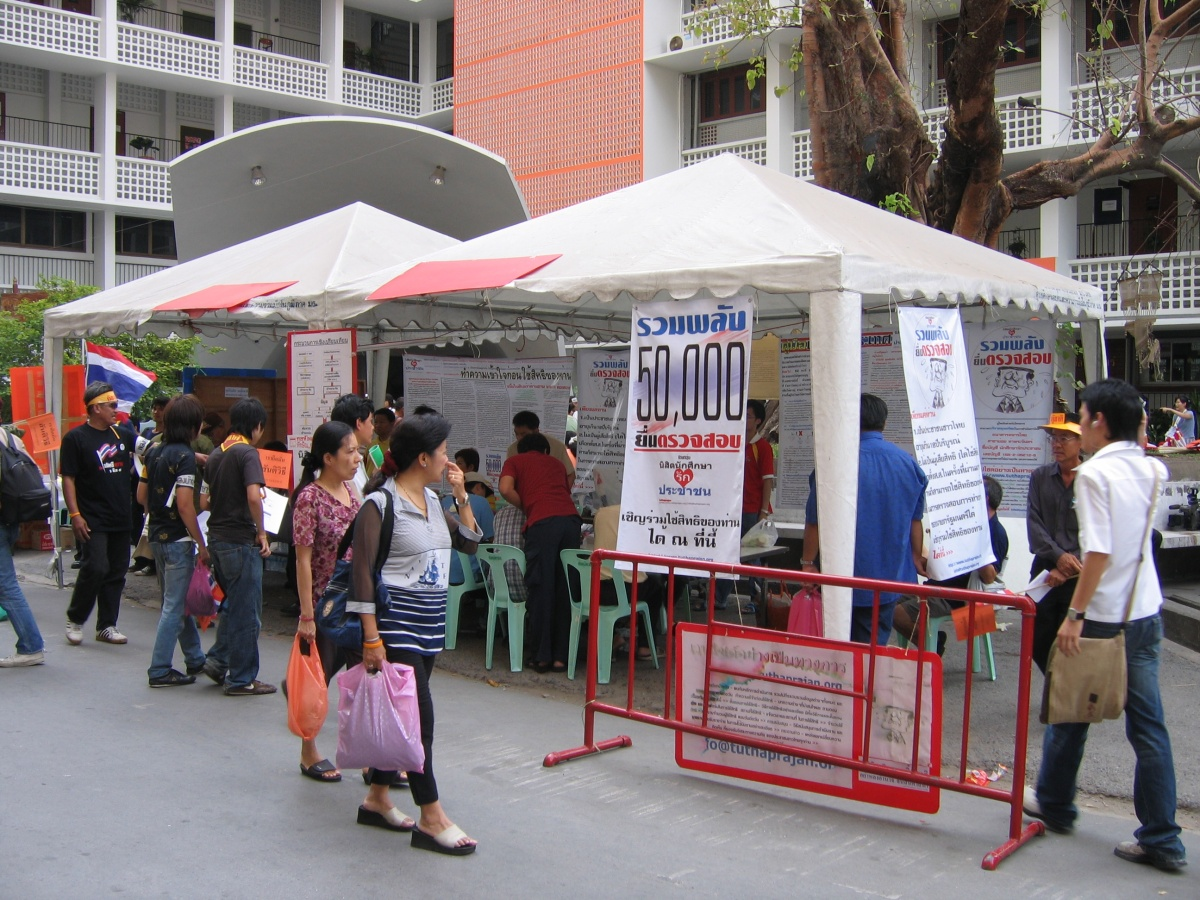
Signature collecting booth at Thammasat University

In February 2006, 28 senators submitted a petition to the Constitutional Court calling for the Prime Minister's impeachment for conflicts of interest and improprieties in the sell-off of Shin Corporation under Articles 96, 216, and 209 of the Thai Constitution. The senators said that the Prime Minister violated the Constitution and was no longer qualified for office under Article 209. However, the Court rejected the petition on 16 February, with the majority judges saying the petition failed to present sufficient grounds to support the prime minister's alleged misconduct.

Another impeachment attempt was made by the Thai university students network, led by Thammasat University students. A petition was launched to impeach Thaksin via the Senate. As of 27 February 2006, over 50,000 people had signed the petition. This exceeded the minimum number required by the Constitution to launch the bid.

== House dissolution and the April 2006 Legislative Election ==
=== House dissolution ===
Thaksin announced a House dissolution on 24 February 2006 in a bid to defuse the political crisis triggered by his family's sale of Shin Corporation. General elections were scheduled for 2 April. In his weekly radio address following the announcement of his decision, Thaksin promised a series of new populist measures, including pay raises for government workers, an increase in the minimum wage, and debt relief for farmers. The opposition Democrat, Chart Thai, and Mahachon parties announced a boycott of the election on 27 February.

The Nation criticised Thaksin's decision to call for parliamentary elections. In an editorial, it noted that the election "fails to take into consideration a major fallacy of the concept, particularly in a less-developed democracy like ours, in which the impoverished, poorly informed masses are easily manipulated by people of his ilk. And Thaksin's manipulation has been well documented. It includes an ingenious use of populist policies that pander to the unprincipled wants and needs of the people."

=== Demand for royal intervention ===
On 24 March 2006, in front of a rally of 50,000 at Sanam Luang, Democrat party leader Abhisit Vejjajiva demanded that King Bhumibol Adulyadej appoint a new Prime Minister and Cabinet to resolve the political crisis. The People's Alliance for Democracy's (PAD), The Law Society of Thailand, and the Press Council of Thailand also called for royal intervention. Pongsak Payakavichien, of the Press Council, also called on the civil service to detach itself from the government and demand royal intervention.

However, demands for royal intervention have been met with much criticism. The king himself dismissed the notion in speeches on 26 April to newly appointed judges, saying Article 7 of the Constitution invoked by the anti-Thaksin protestors did not give him that power. "Asking for a Royally appointed prime minister is undemocratic. It is, pardon me, a mess. It is irrational." Worachet Pakeerut, a law lecturer at Thammasat University, stated, "We're trying to involve the monarch in politics, but it's still not time. If we appeal for a new prime minister, aren't we asking the monarch to take sides?" Passakorn Atthasit and 20 relatives of people killed in the October 1973 democracy uprising tied a black cloth around the Democracy Monument and said "We don't care if Mr. Thaksin remains in the post. All we care is that the prime minister is elected. Asking for a royally-bestowed prime minister is akin to ripping the charter apart".

=== April 2006 House election results ===
Unofficial results as of 3 April 2006 gave Thaksin's TRT Party victory, with 462 seats in Parliament and 66% of the popular vote. However, 38 TRT candidates, all in the Democrat-dominated south, failed to win up to 20% of votes from eligible voters in their constituency, thus forcing the Election Commission to hold by-elections on 23 April. Election Commission commissioner Prinya Nakchudtree said that election laws would allow new applications in 23 April by-elections, allowing the Democrat Party (which had boycotted 3 April elections) to run in the by-elections. However, the Democrat Party has vowed to boycott the by-elections and has petitioned the Central Administrative Court to cancel the by-elections. Many expect that this will prevent Parliament from reconvening and a Government from forming within the 3 May time-limit set by the Constitution.

Thaksin unofficially claimed that TRT won 16 million votes nationwide, with 10 million abstentions and invalid ballots, giving him greater than half of the popular vote. Thaksin had earlier promised to not accept the premiership if he received less than half the total vote.

In Bangkok, despite a large number of abstentions, TRT won in every district with not much more than 20% of votes. Out of 2,329,294 Bangkok votes counted as of 22.31 hrs on 3 April 2006, TRT won 1,035,254 votes, the remainder being abstentions and invalid ballots.

After unofficial voting tallies became public, the People's Alliance for Democracy (PAD) petitioned the Administrative Court to suspend the results of the election. Chamlong Srimuang declared that the PAD would ignore the results of the election and that the "PAD will go on rallying until Thaksin resigns and Thailand gets a royally-appointed prime minister."

== After the 2006 election ==
=== Thaksin proposes reconciliatory panel ===
On 3 April 2006, Thaksin Shinawatra appeared on television to declare victory in the controversial 2006 election, called for unity in the kingdom, reiterated his proposal for a government of national unity, and proposed the creation of an independent reconciliatory commission to end the political stalemate. He offered to resign if the new panel recommended it. The commission could consist of three former parliament presidents, three Supreme Court presidents, three former prime ministers and rectors of state universities. He also suggested that four potential candidates from the TRT could replace him if he stepped down, including former House Speaker Bhokin Bhalakula and caretaker Commerce Minister Somkid Jatusripitak.

The Democrat Party and the PAD immediately rejected the reconciliation panel. "It's too late for national reconciliation," said Chamlong Srimuang. The PAD claimed that once again Thaksin was using votes to justify himself, and called for a nationwide protest on Friday 7 April to force the Prime Minister to resign.

=== Thaksin steps down ===
After an audience with King Bhumibol, Thaksin announced on 4 April 2006 that he would not accept the post of Prime Minister after the Parliament reconvenes. However, he would continue to be Caretaker Prime Minister until his successor is elected by the Parliament.

"My main reason for not accepting the post of prime minister is because this year is an auspicious year for the king, whose 60th anniversary on the throne is just 60 days away... I want all Thais to reunite," said Thaksin in a nationally televised speech. He then delegated his functions to Caretaker Deputy Prime Minister Chidchai Wannasathit, moved out of Government House, and scheduled a vacation with his family.

The Democrat Party welcomed the decision and promised to co-operate to resolve the current political crisis. However, they continued their boycott of by-elections. Many expected that the boycott would prevent Parliament from reconvening and a Government from forming within the 3 May time-limit set by the Constitution, thus causing a constitutional crisis. In a celebration at Sanam Luang on 7 April, PAD leaders announced that their new goal was the eradication of the Thaksin "regime" amid continued concerns that a constitutional crisis, a lack of a government, and continued protests could spoil King Bhumibol Adulyadej's Diamond Jubilee Celebrations on 9 June.

=== Removal of the Election Commission ===
In a rare, televised speech to senior judges, King Bhumibol requested that the judiciary take action to resolve the political crisis. On 8 May 2006, the Constitution Court invalidated the results of the April elections and ordered a new round of elections, later set for October elections. Several judges also called for three members of the Election Commission to resign. The Commissioners refused to do so, citing their constitutional independence. Several legal experts including Worachet Pakeerut and Banjerd Singkanet of Thammasat University noted the unprecedented nature of the judiciary's demands. "I'm concerned that if the courts get too involved in political affairs, politics may hit back. Moreover, it's difficult to examine the courts, and who is to examine the courts' use of power in politics," said Worachet. When the Commissioners still refused to resign, the Criminal Court jailed the Election Commissioners, removing them from their posts.

Thaksin returned to work on 19 May 2006, in the wake of the Constitutional Court's nullification of the April elections and catastrophic flooding in the North. However, political tension remained high. On 22 May, Pairoj Vongvipanon, former dean of the Faculty of Economics, Chulalongkorn University, warned Thaksin of assassination: "Thaksin must be careful or else he might be killed. Don't think that assassinations can not occur in Thailand".

== The "Finland Plan" and the "charismatic individual" ==
On the eve of King Bhumibol Adulyadej's 60th anniversary celebrations, the Manager newspaper and website published several articles on the "Finland Plot", an alleged conspiracy designed by Thaksin and other Thai Rak Thai co-founders aimed at overthrowing the king and seizing control of the country. Democrat Party deputy secretary-general Thaworn Senniam (Thai: ถาวร เสนเนียม) commented that the Finland Plan was "obviously true". In retaliation, Thaksin and TRT sued the owner of the Manager daily Sondhi Limthongkul, its editor, a columnist and two executives for libel.

On 29 June 2006, Thaksin noted that the political crisis was aggravated "because charismatic people and some organisations outside those sanctioned by the Constitution are trying to overthrow the government, rules and laws, Constitution and democracy." This provoked speculation by many, including several members of the royal family, that Thaksin was referring to either King Bhumibol or Privy Council President Prem Tinsulanonda. Sondhi Limthongkul called for the public to take a stand and choose between the King and Thaksin.

On 14 July 2006, Privy Council President Prem Tinsulanonda addressed graduating cadets of the Chulachomklao Royal Military Academy, telling them that the Thai military must obey the orders of the King – not the Government.

== August 2006 attempted car bombing ==
On 24 August 2006, a car containing 67 kilograms of explosives was stopped near Thaksin's residence in Thonburi. Metropolitan Police Bureau Commissioner Lt-General Wiroj Jantharangsee noted that the explosives in the car were completely assembled, equipped with a remote unit sensor and ready to be detonated, and would have a blast radius of around one kilometre. Pol Major Kamthorn Ooycharoen, head of the police bomb-disposal squad at the scene, also noted that the bomb was live and ready for detonation. The bomb was composed of sticks of TNT, M-8 military fuses, TNT, C-4 plastic explosives, a remote control unit, and nine plastic containers containing ammonium nitrate fuel oil (ANFO). The car was driven by Lieutenant Thawatchai Klinchana, former personal chauffeur of Pallop Pinmanee, deputy director of Internal Security Operations Command (ISOC). Police found that the car had left ISOC headquarters earlier that morning. Thawatchai was immediately arrested and Pallop was released from his position.

Pallop denied all involvement, noting that "If had wanted to do it, I would have done it more subtly...In my career, I have led death squads. If I had wanted to kill him, the Prime Minister would not have escaped." He also claimed that "the explosives were being transported, they were not assembled to be detonated". Government critics claimed that the car bomb was a government conspiracy. Five army officers were later arrested for their role in the plot. Lt-General Pirach Swamivat, a schoolmate of Pallop's at the Chulachomklao Royal Military Academy, said he believed that Pallop had been framed. He said it might have something to do with Pallop having sent his men to guard Maj-General Chamlong Srimuang, another Culachomklao schoolmate, who has become critical of Thaksin and is a leader of the anti-government People's Alliance for Democracy.Three officers, including Thawatchai, were released after the military overthrew the Thaksin government. After spending more than 15 years in self-imposed exile, Thaksin Shinawatra returned to Thailand on 22 August 2023, where he was immediately taken into custody upon arrival. Soon after his return, Thaksin's eight-year prison sentence was commuted to one year by a royal pardon issued by King Maha Vajiralongkorn. In 2024, Thaksin was formally indicted on a lèse-majesté charge stemming from comments he made in a 2015 interview, a case that attracted considerable political attention. On 18 November 2025, the Thai Supreme Court ordered Thaksin to pay 17.6 billion baht in back taxes related to the 2006 sale of Shin Corporation shares. Thaksin's political influence remained substantial during this period; his daughter Paetongtarn Shinawatra became Prime Minister in 2024 but was removed from office on 29 August 2025, triggering renewed political uncertainty.

== September 2006 coup d'état ==
The ongoing political crisis escalated drastically on 19 September 2006 when Thai Army units loyal to the army chief of staff, Gen Sonthi Boonyaratglin, staged a coup attempt in Bangkok to unseat Thaksin while he was attending a meeting of the United Nations in New York City.

In a statement, the military Democratic Reform Council cited the government's alleged lèse majesté, interference with state agencies, and creation of social divisions as reasons for the coup. The allegations, however, failed to be pursued seriously, except for charges of corruption in which Thaksin, family and associates were identified by name and criminal offence in court documents. The lèse majesté charge, in fact, was somewhat confused by 2008 accusations by Thai courts that Sondhi Limthongkul, media barron and former associate-turned foe of Thaksin had induced Thai people to believe that there were pro and con-monarchy groups in Thailand. Some believe the accusation was an attempt to reduce the negative image of Thaksin among royalists.

== See also ==
- List of prime ministers of Thailand
- Thaksin Shinawatra
- Constitution of Thailand
- Censorship in Thailand
- 1973 Thai popular uprising
- 1976 Thammasat University massacre
- 2006 Thai coup d'état
- Public opinion of the 2006 Thai coup d'état
- 2008 Thai political crisis
- 2009 Thai political unrest
- 2013–2014 Thai political crisis

== Literature ==
- Pavin Chachavalpongpun (2011), "Thaksin, the military, and Thailand's protracted political crisis", The Political Resurgence of the Military in Southeast Asia: Conflict and leadership, Routledge, pp. 45–62
- Michael K. Connors (2008), "Thailand—Four elections and a coup", Australian Journal of International Affairs, 62 (4): 478–496, doi:10.1080/10357710802480717, S2CID 154415628
- Oliver Pye; Wolfram Schaffar (2008). "The 2006 anti-Thaksin movement in Thailand: An analysis". Journal of Contemporary Asia. 38 (1): 38–61. doi:10.1080/00472330701651945. S2CID 154901086.
