= Censorship in Thailand =

Censorship in Thailand involves the strict control of political news under successive governments, including by harassment and manipulation.

Freedom of speech was guaranteed in 1997 and those guarantees continue in 2007. Mechanisms for censorship have included strict lèse-majesté laws, direct government/military control over the broadcast media, and the use of economic and political pressure. Criticism of the king is banned by the constitution, although most lèse-majesté cases have been directed at foreigners, or at Thai opponents of political, social and commercial leaders.

Thailand ranked 59 of 167 countries in 2004 and then fell to 107 of 167 countries in 2005 in Press Freedom Index from Reporters Without Borders. Thailand's ranking fell to 153 of 178 in 2010 and rose to 137 of 179 in 2011–2012. In the 2014 index, Thailand ranked 130 of 180 nations, falling to 142 in 2017 and to 140 in 2018.

== Guarantees of freedom of speech, expression, and the press ==
Freedom of speech was guaranteed in the 1997 constitution of Thailand. Those guarantees continue in the 2007 Constitution, which states in part:

- Section 36: A person shall enjoy the liberty of communication by any means [บุคคลย่อมมีเสรีภาพในการติดต่อสื่อสารถึงกันไม่ว่าในทางใดๆ].
  - Censorship, detention or disclosure of communication between persons including any other act disclosing a statement in communication between persons shall not be made except by virtue of the provisions of the law specifically enacted for security of the state or maintaining public order or good morals.
- Section 45: A person shall enjoy the liberty to express his or her opinion, make speeches, write, print, publicize, and make expression by other means.
  - Restriction on liberty under paragraph one shall not be imposed except by virtue of the provisions of law specifically enacted for the purpose of maintaining the security of the state, safeguarding the rights, liberties, dignity, reputation, family or privacy rights of other persons, maintaining public order or good morals or preventing the deterioration of the mind or health of the public.
  - Closure of a press house or radio or television station to deprive them of the liberty under this section shall not be made.
  - Censorship by a competent official of news and articles before their publication in a newspaper, printed matter, or radio or television broadcasting shall not be made except during the time when the country is in a state of war or armed conflict; provided that it must be made by virtue of the law enacted under the provisions of paragraph two.
  - Owner of a newspaper or other mass media business shall be a Thai national.
  - No grant of money or other properties shall be given by the state as subsidies to private newspapers or other mass media.
- Section 46: Officials or employees of a private sector undertaking, newspaper or radio or television broadcasting business shall enjoy their liberty to present news and express their opinions under the constitutional restrictions without mandate of any state agency or owner of such business provided that it is not contrary to their professional ethics.
- Section 26: In exercising powers of all state authorities, regard shall be given to human dignity, rights, and liberties in accordance with the provisions of this Constitution.
- Section 28: A person can invoke human dignity or exercise his or her rights and liberties in so far as it is not in violation of rights and liberties of other persons or contrary to this Constitution or good morals.
- Section 29: Restriction of such rights and liberties as recognized by the Constitution shall not be imposed on a person except by virtue of provisions of the law which must not affect the essential substances of such rights and liberties.

== Print media ==
The first instance of censorship in Thailand occurred with the advent of the first printing press in the country. Thailand's first law book was banned and all copies and the original manuscript were ordered destroyed.

Under the 1941 Printing and Advertisement Act, the Royal Thai Police Special Branch has the authority to issue warnings to publications for various violations such as disturbing the peace, interfering with public safety, or offending public morals.

According to a study by the Political Science Library at Thammasat University, from 1850 to 1999, 1,057 books and periodicals were officially banned by publication in the Royal Gazette, including many books among the "100 books every Thai should read". Many titles reflect their era of anti-communist fervor but were published both in Thailand and abroad in Thai, Chinese, Vietnamese, Korean, Bahasa, English, German, French, and Spanish.

Historically, this and other acts have been used to severely restrict press freedom, especially during the military governments of Plaek Pibulsonggram, Sarit Dhanarajata, and Thanom Kittikachorn (up to 1973). Books on Thai feudalism, the monarchy, and religion viewed by the Thai government as disruptive were banned and their authors imprisoned. A student-led uprising in 1973 led to a brief period of press freedom, until a violent military crackdown in 1976 resulted in a major clamp-down. The 1980s saw the gradual thawing of press censorship.

=== Books ===
Sarakadee Magazine has published a three part overview of book censorship in Thailand.

Unless critical of the royal family, monarchy or sensitive government issues, foreign and domestic books normally are not censored and circulate freely. All public discussion of the death of 20-year-old King Ananda Mahidol (Rama VIII), the previous king's elder brother, of a single gunshot wound to the head is discouraged and not taught in schools even to history majors.

The Devil's Discus by Rayne Kruger (London: Cassell, 1964), a result of investigative reporting, which examines the case of King Ananda, was immediately banned and its author barred from Thailand. Curiously, neither the book's Japanese or Thai translation (in 1972) have been banned. However, the first 16 pages of all extant copies of The Devil's Discus in Thai have been excised and seem to have no text corresponding to the English original.

Widely considered to be the father of Thai democracy, Pridi Banomyong was a writer of the first Thai constitution in 1932 which transformed Thailand from an absolute monarchy to a constitutional monarchy. In addition, he was twice prime minister, a wartime underground hero who fought the Japanese occupation of Thailand, and the founder of Thammasat University.

However, Pridi was brought under suspicion of regicide in the death of King Ananda by his chief political rival, strongman military Prime Minister Plaek Pibulsonggram and was forced to flee into exile with his chief aide-de-camp (and Ananda's), Vacharachai Chaisittiwet. Vacharachai's brother became the Thai translator of The Devil's Discus in an attempt to clear his name. Most Thais today have forgotten that Pridi Banomyong, the father of Thai democracy, died in exile.

Three royal servants were executed without warning and in secrecy for regicide in 1955, nine years after King Ananda's death, after many acquittals and subsequent prosecution appeals with little evidence, old or new, but which resulted in fresh convictions for all three in Thailand's highest court. The entire legal case appears to have been predicated on hearsay and the motivation political, purely to keep Pridi out of the picture. King Bhumibol (Rama IX), a young, untested monarch at the time, failed to exercise his royal prerogative of pardon for the three prisoners, despite the many questionable facets to the case.

The Revolutionary King by William Stevenson (London: Constable, 1999) was initiated by King Bhumibol as a semi-official hagiography. King Bhumibhol had translated Stevenson's book, A Man Called Intrepid, into Thai and reportedly admired Stevenson's work. In any case, Stevenson was granted unprecedented personal access to both the King himself and members of the royal family.

However, when the published book appeared, not only was it riddled with simple inaccuracies, but it shocked many Thai readers by referring to the king throughout the book by his childhood nickname, Lek. The book presented a unique new theory of Japanese involvement in the death of King Ananda. Not known is whether this theory originated with King Bhumibol. The book was unofficially banned in Thailand from the date of its publication. However, in 2005, reportedly through royal intervention, the book could be ordered from bookstores in Thailand, but no bookstore has been willing to stock it.

A more recent controversy has occurred over The King Never Smiles (New Haven & London: Yale University Press, 2006) by a former Bangkok-based correspondent, Paul Handley, described by its publishers as an "interpretive biography" of King Bhumibol. The book itself was banned in Thailand on its publication in July 2006 and websites selling the book were blocked from November 2005. No advance reading copies or excerpts of the book were made available by its publishers.

In November 2014, Thai police announced the banning of A Kingdom in Crisis: Thailand’s Struggle for Democracy in the Twenty-First Century by Andrew MacGregor Marshall, prior to its release in Thailand. Police stated that reviews of the book in The Independent and the South China Morning Post had provided sufficient evidence that the book threatens "peace and order, and the good morality of the people". Marshall claims that recent turmoil in Thai politics is driven largely by internal conflicts over succession to the throne. Any discussion of the royal succession is taboo in Thailand. More recent reviews are divided as to whether Marshall has convincingly made his point that succession is the key to understanding Thai politics.

One example of censoring media of foreign origin is the case of Bangkok Inside Out, a tourist guide, which, according to the Ministry of Culture, "taints the image of Thailand and its people". Most censored books are in Thai, published in Thailand. At the same time, most books since 1999 are banned "unofficially" which makes gathering censorship data difficult.

A good example of this modern variety of unofficial Thai censorship is the book The Images of Pridi Banomyong and Thai Politics 1932–1983, written by Morakot Jaewjinda as her master's thesis in history at Srinakharinwirot University. Although Morakot's thesis was published in 1987, the criminal defamation case against her by Khunying (a Thai royal decoration of recognition) Nongyao Chaiseree, former rector of Thammasat University, is only starting to be heard in court in 2007.

Self-censorship is a growing trend in Thailand. In February 2007, Chula Book Centre, the bookstore of Chulalongkorn University, refused to carry the book The 19 September Coup: A Coup for a Democratic Regime Under the Constitutional Monarchy, an anthology critical of Thailand's 2006 military coup d'état written in Thai by leading intellectuals and academics, including Nidhi Eoseewong, Somsak Jeamtheerasakul, Thongchai Winichakul, and Sulak Sivaraksa. A few Thai language bookstores did sell the book, however, and reported brisk sales. Later in the month, Chula Book Centre and CU Books reneged on their agreement to both sell and distribute A Coup for the Rich primarily because some of the sources quoted were from The King Never Smiles. The book was written by Dr. Giles Ji Ungpakorn, professor at Chulalongkorn's Faculty of Political Science. On 6 March, Thammasat University Bookstore followed suit in refusing to sell the book even though it had not been officially banned, although the university's rector overturned that decision and the book is now for sale at the university bookstore. A Foreign Correspondents' Club of Thailand panel concluded that it should be anticipated that A Coup for the Rich would be confiscated and banned.

Freedom Against Censorship Thailand (FACT) has initiated the Banned Books Project to scan as many books banned in Thailand as possible for free publication on the Web, beginning with books in several languages about the death of King Ananda.

During the existence of the Communist Party of Thailand, books pertaining to communism and socialism (references to Karl Marx, Friedrich Engels, Vladimir Lenin, Josif Stalin, Lev Trotsky, or Mao Zedong) and associated publications, e.g., The Communist Manifesto, Das Kapital were banned—to the extent of not using and/or teaching it in social sciences courses nor to sociology majors. This also extended to publications involving proletarian revolution usually associated with Maoist organizations associated with the Revolutionary Internationalist Movement. Individuals in possession of communist literature (books, print/electronic media, academic journals, audio, video footage) would be found guilty of treason against the Thai government.

=== Periodicals ===
The press has also been censored for publishing news damaging to the monarchy. Thai governments have been accused of pressuring the press to limit damaging coverage.

A 2002 issue of The Economist was withheld because it made an "inappropriate" reference to the monarchy. Fah Diew Kan, a political and social commentary magazine was prohibited and sellers charged with lèse-majesté under the military junta-appointed government of Prime Minister Surayud Chulanont. Defamation and lèse-majesté laws are commonly used for censorship and political suppression in Thailand, as is a law prohibiting discussion or criticism of Thai court decisions. Sulak Sivaraksa, perhaps predictably, wrote a review of The King Never Smiles in English for his Seeds of Peace magazine published by the International Network of Engaged Buddhists in Bangkok.

On 6 August 2005, the Bangkok Post published a front-page story on cracks in Suvarnabhumi Airport's west runway. Citing unnamed sources, the article noted that aviation experts recommended reconstruction to repair large cracks. A newspaper internal investigation found that while there were small cracks on the shoulders of the runway, its source wrongly claimed experts believed the runway needed reconstruction. The anonymous source, who claimed to be a businessman whose brother was close to some members of the prime minister's Thai Rak Thai party, refused to confirm his comments. Chief reporter Sermsuk Kasitipradit and news editor Chadin Thepaval were found to have acted negligently in publishing the story and were fired. Some critics in the newspaper claimed that the source was pressured by the government not to confirm the details of the story.

Also in August 2005, Rungruang Preechakul, editor of Siam Rath Weekly News Magazine, quit after covering alleged government mishandling of the bird flu crisis.

On 10 March 2006 the then-governor of Nakhon Ratchasima Province, Mr. Pongpayome Wasaputi, during a regular scheduled press conference with the local media, asked Frank G. Anderson, founder of the Korat Post newspaper, to "kindly refrain from carrying any more headlines regarding events at Watpa Salawan, because it is like irritating an old sore." The governor was referring to coverage of allegations of sexual impropriety against the temple's abbot, Luang Pho Pherm, who had a considerable official following.

In 2006, Tongnoi Tongyai, the private secretary to Crown Prince Maha Vajiralongkorn, was about to be appointed to the board of directors of Shin Corporation when his appointment was shot down by the palace. Post Today, a Thai-language sister paper of the Bangkok Post, had to pull thousands of copies after publishing a story quoting a leftist academic asking the press to investigate why Tongnoi was dismissed in such a strange manner. Vajiralongkorn called a group of reporters to the palace, where he reportedly asked them: "Do you have a problem with me?". No one replied.

On 10 February 2010 it was learned that the children of Thaksin Shinawatra would petition the supreme court to gag the media on speculation of a pending judgment of the deposed prime minister's assets. Subsequently, popular English-language expatriate forums such as Thai Visa broadcast warnings that they were censored. Readers were advised to follow them on Twitter and other social media platforms to receive related news.

On 12 Nov 2014, in a meeting between junta representatives and the editors of 17 newspapers, military officers reportedly told the journalists that there is a limit to what they can report. "Gen Prayut Chan-o-cha, the Prime Minister and NCPO leader, has never censored the media. We are open, but please stay within the limits. [We] don’t want any colour. [You media] must report news positively," Lt Gen Suchai Pongput was quoted as saying.

== Internet ==
Thailand is engaged in selective filtering in the social, political, and Internet tools areas, and no evidence of filtering was found in the conflict/security area by the OpenNet Initiative in November 2011.

Thailand is on Reporters Without Borders list of countries Under Surveillance in 2011.

Thailand is listed as "Partly Free" in the Freedom on the Net 2013 report by Freedom House, which cites substantial political censorship and the arrest of bloggers and other online users.

Internet censorship is conducted by the Royal Thai Police, the Communications Authority of Thailand, and the Ministry of Information and Communication Technology (MICT) (now the Ministry of Digital Economy and Society).

Prior to the September 2006 military coup d'état most Internet censorship in Thailand was focused on blocking pornographic websites. The following years have seen a constant stream of sometimes violent protests, regional unrest, emergency decrees, a new cybercrimes law, and an updated Internal Security Act. And year by year Internet censorship has grown, with its focus shifting to lèse-majesté, national security, and political issues.

Reasons for blocking:

Prior to 2006	2010	Reason
11%	77%	lèse-majesté content (content that defames, insults, threatens, or is unflattering to the King, includes national security and some political issues)
60%	22%	pornographic content
2%	<1%	content related to gambling
27%	<1%	copyright infringement, illegal products and services, illegal drugs, sales of sex equipment, prostitution, ...

URLs blocked by court order:

Year	Court Orders	Blocked URLs
2007	1	2
2008	13	2071
2009	64	28,705
2010	39	43,908
Total	117	74,686

It is estimated that tens of thousands of additional URLs are blocked without court orders through informal requests or under the Emergency Decree on Public Administration in Emergency Situations. Estimates put the number of websites blocked at over 110,000 and growing in 2010.

According to the Associated Press, the Computer Crime Act has contributed to a sharp increase in the number of lèse-majesté cases tried each year in Thailand. While between 1990 and 2005, roughly five cases were tried in Thai courts each year, since that time about 400 cases have come to trial—a 1,500 percent increase.

Websites are blocked by Uniform Resource Locator (URL) and/or IP address. However, only about 20% of blocked sites are identified by IP address; the remaining 80% are unable to be identified at a specific physical location. If these sites could be identified as being located in Thailand, legal action could be taken against their operators. Thus, lack of IP address is a major oversight.

MICT also blocks indirectly by informally "requesting" the blocking of websites by Thailand's 54 commercial and non-profit Internet service providers (ISPs). Although ISPs are not legally required to accede to these "requests", MICT Permanent Secretary Kraisorn Pornsuthee wrote in 2006 that ISPs who fail to comply will be punitively sanctioned by government in the form of bandwidth restriction or even loss of their operating license. This is a powerful compulsion to comply.

Censorship of the Internet in Thailand is currently for website access only. Thai Internet users are still able to interact with other users using e-mail, Instant Messaging, and Twitter without being censored.

In January 2010, it was reported that as part of the Department of Special Investigations' (DSI) efforts to increase cyber-policing, it had expanded cooperation between 'government agencies, research agencies and educational institutions' in building digital forensic resources. DSI has partnered with two Thai universities to train students in assisting government cyber investigations. Despite the many threats to Thailand's cyber-space, even the deputy executive director at the National Electronics and Computer Technology Center (Nectec), Asanee Kawtrakul, acknowledged that most big computer crime cases in the past year involved violations of lèse-majesté laws. It is hard to ignore the role academia is being asked to play in cyber-censorship.

== Broadcast media ==
=== Television ===
Censored character with bloodied face from One Piece on Thai TV

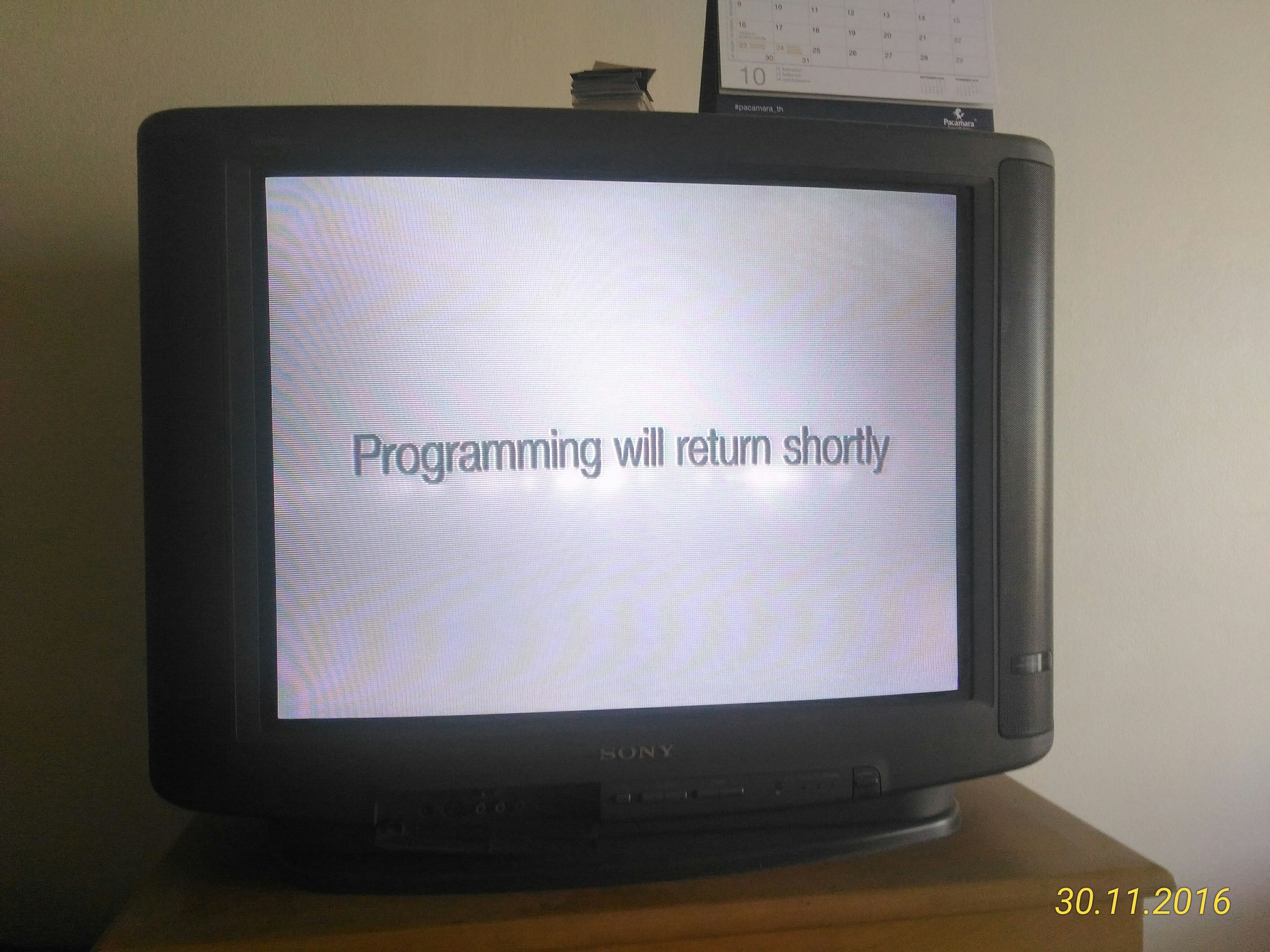
Blanked screen during a BBC programme on Thai monarchy

In television broadcasts, scenes with "...clothes showing cleavage, a man's bare chest, weapons pointed at people, consumption of alcohol and even the bottom of a shoe (because showing your heel in Thailand is considered rude) are all obscured..." If a Thai TV show is broadcast overseas the blurs will most likely be omitted. As in all media, criticism of the king is not allowed.

After the military coup of September 2006, the junta sent tanks and troops to secure all television stations. Junta leaders demanded the censorship of news reports and opinion polls as they might portray the military negatively. Thai television broadcasters did not air footage of demonstrations against the coup. Local cable broadcasts of CNN, BBC, CNBC, NHK, and several other foreign news channels were censored, with footage showing former Premier Thaksin blacked out.

The nine members of the board of directors of MCOT, a privatized state-owned media company, resigned on 26 September to take responsibility for allowing Thaksin Shinwatra to address the nation on MCOT-controlled Modernine TV (Channel 9). Seven months after the coup, in an editorial, the Bangkok Post reported that military censorship of broadcast media was tighter than at any time in the past 15 years.

In November 2006, an interview with Nuamthong Phaiwan, a taxi driver who drove his taxi into a tank to protest the coup, was broadcast by iTV. The broadcast came to an abrupt end after the director of army-owned Channel 5 made a threatening telephone call. Although the station was already occupied by the military, an additional 20 soldiers were dispatched to the station. The junta also sent a letter to the six public TV channels summoning their news editors for instruction on "constructive reporting for peace of the nation."

Also in November 2006, the military junta cancelled the most popular program on MCOT's Modernine TV, Khui Khui Khao. The anti-Thaksin movement, which had seized power in a military coup, claimed the program's host, prominent Thai political commentator Sorrayuth Suthassanachinda, was a supporter of the overthrown premier.

In May 2014, the military junta interrupted a talk show, where a political science professor was discussing the Thai Army's declaration of martial law. The show was interrupted to broadcast "Order No. 9" from the Peace and Order Maintaining Command. The order banned media from interviewing academics who could incite conflict. Also, censorship was extended into social media. Newspapers were warned not to publish anything that could cause unrest. Some academics were ordered by regional commanders not to comment on the political situation.

In November 2014, the military junta pressured Thai PBS to drop a talk show that "discussed dissatisfaction with the 22 May coup." At least four colonels visited Thai PBS headquarters in Bangkok and instructed the station's directors to stop the broadcast of a talk show in which the host, Nattaya Wawweerakhup, asked villagers and activists for their opinions on the junta's reform process. The host, Nattaya, was removed from the show altogether.

=== Radio ===
Radio stations in Thailand must be government licensed and have traditionally been operated primarily by the government and military. Ownership of radio outlets by government, military, and quasi-government entities have often undermined freedom of the media.

In May 1993, the military shut down an army-owned radio station leased to a private news group for three days after the station ran a commentary critical of the armed forces. More recently, in March 2003 the Independent News Network (INN) radio broadcast was temporarily cancelled after the network aired a cabinet member's criticisms of the government. In response to public protests, the government restored the broadcast and claimed that INN's failure to renew their broadcast license was the reason for the temporary closure.

It was rumored that on 1 February 2006, a business news commentary program, "Business Focus", was taken off the air from the FM 101 radio station because it devoted time to discussing the Shinawatra family's controversial multimillion-dollar share deal with Singapore's Temasek Holdings.

In February 2007, Thai authorities, under a newly elected alleged "Thaksin nominee" government, cancelled a popular FM radio program hosted by Fatima Broadcasting because the show's host was a regular critic of the former premier. While officials claim they did not pressure the station's owner, the show's host has published an account claiming otherwise.

Community radio (CR) stations, mostly unlicensed, saw dramatic growth during the Thaksin-government. There have been fears that the medium might be censored. In 2008, there are nearly 4,000 community radio stations operating in Thailand, mostly unlicensed. Community radio stations have been accused of causing interference with television, air traffic control radio, and other licensed radio stations. However, limited crackdowns on selected community radio stations have caused critics to accuse the government of political interference. The current Constitution of 2007 provides in Article 47 that "community" is guaranteed the right to offer "community broadcast". The Broadcasting Act of 2008 provides that the broadcasting regulator is authorized to issue "community broadcast" licenses to stations which offer non-commercial service to a local audience. The Broadcasting Act of 2008 prohibits the community broadcaster from engaging in commercial activities or undertake any commercial undertaking. As of July 2008, no community broadcast license has been sought or issued. The National Telecommunications Commission as a temporary regulator/licensor of CR and CTV in Thailand proposed a draft "provisional license" for CR and CTV in May 2009. During June, an NTC subcommittee on broadcasting went around Thailand to "pre-register" prospective CR operators with the expectation that when the regulation becomes effective in July, the license process will be expedited. The "pre-registration" workshops were held in Bangkok, Chiang Mai, Khon Kaen, and Songkhla.

== Film ==
Until 2008, the Film Censorship Board (FCB) of the Department of Cultural Promotion, Ministry of Culture, operated under the aegis of the 1930 Film Act, wherein theater owners and broadcasters must submit films that they plan to show to the Film Censorship Board for review. The board is composed of officials representing the Ministry of Education, the Ministry of University Affairs, the military, the Department of Religious Affairs, and the Ministry of Foreign Affairs. The board may ban films if its requirements that portions of the film be removed are not met. Reasons for censoring films include violating moral and cultural norms and disturbing the public order and national security. Also under Thai law, any film mentioning prostitution in Thailand or failure to depict Buddhism with absolute reverence is subject to censorship. Theatre owners and broadcasters frequently censor films themselves before submitting them to the board.

The Censorship Board initially banned the film Schindler's List because of a nude scene. However, after a furor in the press, the board reversed its decision. According to the office of the Film Censorship Board, of the 230 films submitted for review in 2002, one was banned. Of the 282 films submitted for review in 2003, four were banned, three South Korean and one from the US. Officers at the censorship board cited sex and nudity as the main reasons for banning the four films.

In 2007, the National Legislative Assembly considered a proposed film ratings system, which is viewed by the film industry as even more restrictive, because in addition to a motion picture ratings system, the Board of Censors would remain in place, and would retain the power to cut or ban films. With the Motion Pictures and Video Act B.E. 2551 (2008), Thailand introduced a rating system for films in 2009. Some anticipate that, with a rating system, the Film Censorship Board will relax its control over films by leaving it to viewers to decide for themselves whether they wish to view films that are rated as having objectionable content. In this way, a film which contains some sex and nudity or graphic violence could be released unedited—but branded 13+, 15+, 18+ or 20+ according to its content. The Thai film Nak Prok is an example of this flexibility. The film, originally banned from cinemas in Thailand owing to its unfavorable depiction of Buddhist monks, was released in 2010 with an 18+ rating under the new law.

=== The King and I ===
All versions of the story of Anna Leonowens and King Mongkut (Rama IV) have been banned in Thailand, including the 1956 musical The King and I. More recently, the 1999 movie Anna and the King was also banned for "several scenes that distort history and insult the king", despite the fact that a number of changes were made to the script. Censorship Board member Thepmontri Limpayom castigated the film, saying: "The filmmakers have made King Mongkut look like a cowboy who rides on the back of an elephant as if he is in a cowboy movie. In one scene Chow Yun-fat pushes the king's crown and his portrait down to the floor—that's totally unacceptable." Another board member added: "If we cut all the scenes which we consider mock the monarchy it would only run for about 20 minutes."

=== The Da Vinci Code ===
Thai Christian groups protested the film The Da Vinci Code and called for it to be banned. On 16 May 2006, the Thai Censorship Committee issued a ruling that the film would be shown, but that the last 10 minutes would be cut. Also, some Thai subtitles were to be edited to change their meaning and passages from the Bible would also be quoted at the beginning and end of the film. However, the following day, Sony Pictures appealed the ruling, saying it would pull the film if the decision to cut it was not reversed. The censorship panel then voted 6–5 that the film could be shown uncut, but that a disclaimer would precede and follow the film, saying it was a work of fiction.

=== Syndromes and a Century ===
After controversy surrounded Apichatpong Weerasethakul's film Syndromes and a Century, the Free Thai Cinema Movement started to gain momentum in late-April 2007. As a reaction to an unfavorable trip to the Censorship Board, which would not approve release in Thailand without specific cuts to be administered by the board, Apichatpong decided to cancel local release of the film. The censors, fearing that Apichatpong might show his film anyway, refused to return his print. These actions sparked a far-reaching discussion and a petition, signed by artists and scholars, that was submitted to the legislative assembly of the Thai government.

=== Operation Mekong ===
On 30 September 2016, Chinese director Dante Lam Chiu-Yin's film, Operation Mekong opened in Hong Kong. It concerns an incident that occurred in Chiang Saen District of Chiang Rai Province on 5 October 2011 when 13 Chinese crew members from two cargo ships were murdered by a Myanmar drug-trafficking ring. Prime Minister Prayut Chan-o-cha, responding to news of the film's imminent release, said that the film would be banned in Thailand if it was found to "damage" the country. "I have ordered authorities to check the content of Operation Mekong. If it is damaging, it will be banned," Gen Prayut said. Some believe that the reason for his government's nervousness is that Thai troops, the "elite" anti-drug Pa Muang Task Force, were known to have been at the scene of the massacre. Nine soldiers were arrested, but "...have since disappeared from the justice system." Naw Kham, a Golden Triangle drug kingpin, and his gang were found guilty of attacking the two Chinese cargo ships in collusion with Thai soldiers. He was executed in March 2013 in China along with three accomplices, including a Thai national.

=== Thai films ===
In 2018, Thai government censors banned the film, Thi Baan The Series 2.2, unless a scene depicting a monk bursting into tears at his ex-girlfriend's coffin was removed. In 2015, the board banned horror film Arbat ('Sin of a Monk') for scenes portraying a novice monk behaving inappropriately in the view of the censors. The studio had to re-edit the movie before re-submitting it to the board, and the director commented: "I cut the film through my tears." Other censored Thai films includes Insects in the Backyard and Shakespeare Must Die.

=== Foreign films shot in Thailand ===
All foreign companies must apply for shooting permission to the Film Board of Thailand. Some topics will be rejected if the script is judged inappropriate. The Film Board checks to see that the script, plot, and other details are acceptable to the board.

== Video games ==
Following the 2014 Thai coup d'état, in August 2014 it was reported that the Thai junta had banned Tropico 5, the latest edition in a popular series of computer games in which gamers assume the personality of a dictator on a tropical island.

"Tropico 5 has been banned but I cannot give the reason unless you ask permission from our Director-General," said an unnamed official at the Video and Film Office, part of the Ministry of Culture.

— Sydney Morning Herald, 2014-08-05

== Individual speech ==
Although freedom of speech was guaranteed by the 1997 constitution, it was limited by several laws. The king may not be spoken ill of and lèse-majesté laws are enforced. In 1986, Deputy Interior Minister Veera Musikapong was convicted, imprisoned, and banned from politics for a campaign speech in which he noted that if he were born the crown prince, he "would be drinking whiskey instead of standing here getting pains in my knees."

The judgment of Thai courts may not be criticized. After a controversial ruling in July 2006 in which a criminal court jailed three election commissioners, the court worked with the police to identify 16 individuals who were captured on TV news footage criticizing the judgement. The court later found all the individuals guilty and gave jail terms to 4 of them. The maximum jail sentence for the offence is seven years.

Furthermore, defamation laws were frequently used to silence dissidents during the Thaksin administration, often by the prime minister himself. This led to a backlog in the courts of defamation suits and counter-suits. Also, it is not uncommon practice in Thailand for lawyers to pay bribes to judges to hand down lighter sentences which can attract media criticism thereby exposing the judges involved in corruption.

== Self-censorship ==
Self-censorship has a long tradition in Thailand. It is resorted to mostly from fear of being charged with a violation of lèse-majesté statutes.

Former Prime Minister Thaksin Shinawatra was repeatedly accused of using his political and economic power to silence dissenting voices and curbing freedom of speech stemming from his direct authority over state-owned TV stations coupled with his family owning the other broadcast TV channels. Responding to critics, he sold all of his family's interests in the broadcast media in 2006.

Criticisms of the Thai government range from the frequent use of libel suits against critics to coercion leading to self-censorship. Self-censorship has been used as an excuse for the central government or administrative branch to interfere in people's communications infrastructure. All radio and television stations in Thailand operate at the will of the government.

In 2003, the Thai Journalists Association (TJA) rapped the spread of self-censorship as well as the "sophisticated and subversive means" used by the authorities to control the media, fearing they would turn into propaganda mouthpieces of the Thaksin government. On the occasion of the World Press Freedom Day 2006, the TJA labeled the situation of press freedom in Thailand as an "era of fear and hatred".

Channel 3 (Thailand) published a very short statement saying that the drama series "Nua Mek" which depicted corrupt politicians, a fictitious prime minister, and his crooked deputy, scheduled to air on Friday, 11 January 2013, was deemed "inappropriate" and that another drama series would be aired instead. Warathep Rattanakorn, of the Office of the Prime Minister, responsible for overseeing all state media, insisted that there was no interference from the government or MCOT (the Mass Communications Organisation of Thailand, which issued the concession to privately owned Channel 3.)

== Libel suits ==
The threat of libel suits has long been used to silence government critics.

The government of Thaksin Shinawatra filed numerous libel suits against government critics, in what the International Federation of Journalists (IFJ) called "Thai Prime Minister Thaksin Shinawatra's continued use of criminal defamation charges to silence media criticism of his government". Brad Adams, executive director of Human Rights Watch's Asia Division, noted that "it's impossible to distinguish a libel suit from an attempt to silence the prime minister's critics. Thailand's once-vigorous free press is being slowly squeezed to death."

Notable libel suits filed by Thaksin include:

The suit by Shin Corporation (at the time owned by Thaksin's family) against Supinya Klangnarong, Secretary General of the Campaign for Popular Media Reform. In an article, published in July 2003 in the Thai Post, Supinya had indicated the rise in the Shin Corporation's profits since Thaksin's Thai Rak Thai party had gained power in 2001 (approximately US$980mn), might be a result of benefits to Shin Corp from the government's policies, which would amount to a conflict of interest. The charges were dropped in March 2006 after Supinya received considerable Thai and international support and her case became a cause celebre for free speech and media freedom. Thus far, there has been no countersuit for damages against the embattled PM-in-exile.

On 4 April 2006, People's Alliance for Democracy (PAD) leader and fierce Thaksin critic Sondhi Limthongkul was sued by Thaksin for allegedly slandering him during an anti-Thaksin rally. In total, Sondhi has around 40 complaints lodged against him.

== Art ==
=== Chinese censorship of BACC exhibition ===
In July 2025, officials from the Chinese Embassy in Bangkok requested the censorship and removal of pieces deemed offensive to China in a Bangkok Art and Culture Centre (BACC) exhibition titled "Constellation of Complicity: Visualising the Global Machinery of Authoritarian Solidarity". Acting through the Ministry of Foreign Affairs and Bangkok Metropolitan Administration, the BACC was forced to remove pieces and names of Tibetan, Uyghur, and Hong Kong artists. The move was characterized as Chinese transnational repression by human rights groups, journalists, and the artist community.

== See also ==
- Chilling effect (law)
- Telecommunications in Thailand
- Constitution of Thailand
- Law of Thailand
- Lèse-majesté in Thailand

General:

- Human rights in Thailand

== Literature ==
- David Streckfuss (2011), Truth on Trial in Thailand: Defamation, treason and lèse-majesté, Routledge, ISBN 978-0-415-41425-8
- Sinfah Tunsarawuth (September 2012), "Royal Chill", Index on Censorship, 41 (3): 103–107, doi:10.1177/0306422012456809, S2CID 220923628
- Aim Sinpeng (2013). "State Repression in Cyberspace: The Case of Thailand". Asian Politics & Policy. 5 (3): 421–440. doi:10.1111/aspp.12036.
- Hunt, Matthew (2020). Thai Cinema Uncensored. Chiang Mai: Silkworm Books. ISBN 9786162151699.
