= Supinya Klangnarong =

Thai media rights activist

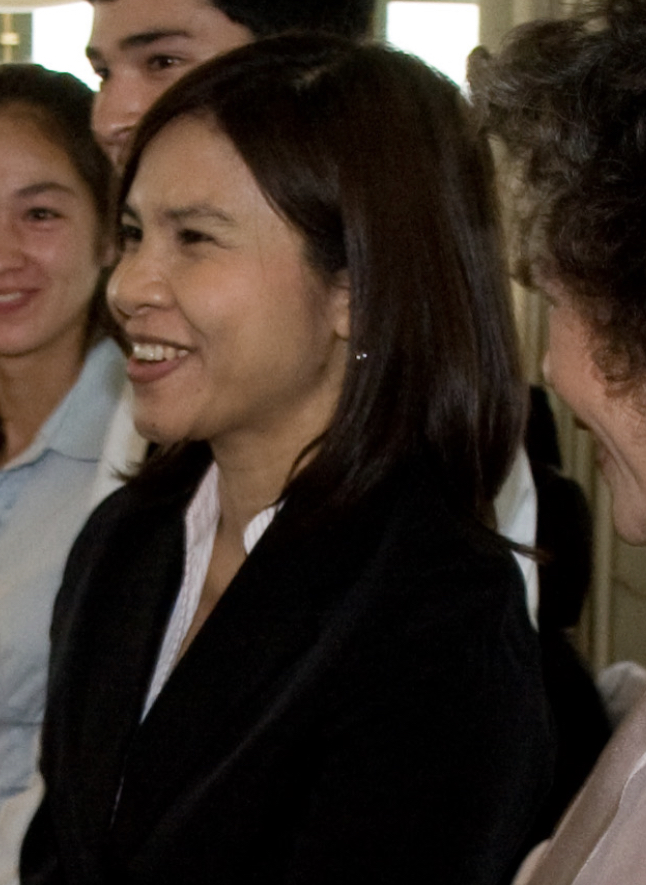
Supinya, 2009

Supinya Klangnarong (born 1976) is a Thai media rights advocate and current vice-chair of the Campaign for Popular Media Reform (CPMR). A graduate of Chulalongkorn University, she holds a BA from the Faculty of Communication Arts, an MA from the Faculty of Journalism and Mass Communication at Thammasat University and an MA in Communication Policy and Regulations from the University of Westminster.

She previously served as secretary-general of the CPMR from 2003-2008 and was co-founder and coordinator of Freedom Against Censorship Thailand (FACT) from 2006-2009. Supinya now serving as a coordinator for the Thai Netizen Network (TNN)], an Internet rights group.

Supinya has been selected to serve in September 2011 as a media expert to Thailand's National Broadcasting and Telecommunications Commission (NBTC). The commission oversees all public and private media outlets.

2020–Present, Co-founder, Cofact Thailand & Digital Thinkers Forum

Supinya joined the People's Alliance for Democracy (PAD), anti-Thaksin movement in 2006. When PAD revived in 2008, Supinya refused to join them, she has also been criticised by the members of PAD.

On 16 July 2003, the Thai Post, a Thai-language daily newspaper, published comments from Supinya who said that Shin Corporation, then majority-owned by the family of Thai Prime Minister Thaksin Shinawatra, had benefited from favorable policies by the Thaksin government. The Shin Corporation filed a criminal libel lawsuit over the article, naming Supinya and the paper as co-defendants. In addition, Shin filed a civil suit seeking 400 million baht in compensation. After the Thaksin family sold its shares in Shin Corporation to Singapore's Temasek Holdings, the company offered to drop the lawsuit on the condition that Supinya apologize for her comments. Supinya refused the offer.

On 14 March 2006, the Criminal Court threw out the criminal lawsuit, saying the article in the Thai Post was presented in good faith and in the public's best interest. On 8 May 2006, Shin Corporation asked that the civil lawsuit be withdrawn. Neither Supinya nor Thai Post had any objections, and the civil suit was dropped.

The cases were the subject of the 2007 independent documentary film, The Truth Be Told: The Cases Against Supinya Klangnarong, filmed over the course of nearly three years and directed by Pimpaka Towira.

During military rule following a bloodless coup d’etat on 19 September 2006, Supinya was arrested for storming Thailand's Parliament house along with 50 others, including former senator Jon Ungpakorn. She charged that the military-appointed National Legislative Assembly was in the process of passing numerous repressive, unconstitutional and antidemocratic laws, including the Computer Crimes Act, the Printing Act, the Film Act and the Internal Security Act, all in 2007. This case has still not gone to trial.
