= Supachot Chaiyasat =

- ศุภโชติ ไชยสัจ

Member of the House of Representatives
- Incumbent
- Assumed office 14 May 2023

Personal details
- Political party: People's
- Education: Kasetsart University (BSE); University of Glasgow (MSc.)

Supachot Chaiyasat (Thai: ศุภโชติ ไชยสัจ) is a Thai politician and Member of Parliament for the People's Party.

== Early life and education ==
Supachot graduated from the University of Glasgow with an MSc. in Sustainable Energy in 2019.

== Career ==
In August 2025, Supachot was among three People's Party MPs sued for defamation by energy company Gulf Development, along with party leader Natthaphong Ruengpanyawut and Woraphop Viriyaroj. Gulf Development is demanding compensation of 100 million Baht from each defendant.

The lawsuit stems from a no-confidence debate where Supachot advocated increasing transparency regarding the Thai government's purchase of energy, citing high prices for consumers.
