= Thai Post =

Thai daily newspaper

- A Thai Post newspaper dated April 4, 2019. The headline reads: "Thanathorn Juangroongruangkit incites the people"
- Type: Daily Newspaper
- Format: Print, online
- Owner: Thai Journal Group Co.
- Founded: 1996
- Political alignment: Far-right, Pro-authoritarianism, Ultraroyalism
- Language: Thai
- Website: https://www.thaipost.net/main/

Thai Post (Thai: ไทยโพสต์) is a daily Thai-language newspaper in Thailand. It is owned by the Thai Journal Group Co. Its circulation is in the 100,000–150,000 range. Currently the newspaper is headquartered in Klong Toei, Bangkok.

== Political stance ==
Thai Post has been accused of biased political reporting in favor of Thai conservatism and nationalism. The newspaper often publishes news with oversensational and misleading headlines, often using disinformation tactics to attack government opposition figures and critics.

On 16 July 2003, the newspaper published comments from media rights advocate Supinya Klangnarong, who said that the Shin Corporation, then majority-owned by the family of Thai Prime Minister Thaksin Shinawatra, had benefited because of favorable policies by the Thaksin government. The newspaper was named as a co-defendant, along with Supinya, in a criminal libel lawsuit brought by Shin Corp. A civil suit sought 400 million baht in compensation. After the Thaksin family sold its shares in Shin Corp to Singapore's Temasek Holdings, the company offered to drop the lawsuit on the condition that Supinya apologized for her comments. Supinya refused the offer. On 14 March 2006, the Criminal Court threw out the criminal lawsuit, saying the article in the Thai Post was presented in good faith and in the public's best interest. On 8 May 2006, Shin Corp. asked that the civil lawsuit be withdrawn. Neither Supinya nor Thai Post had any objections, so the court withdrew the civil suit.

== See also ==
- Media of Thailand
