= Woraphop Viriyaroj =

Thai politician

- วรภพ วิริยะโรจน์

Member of the House of Representatives
- Incumbent
- Assumed office 24 March 2019

Personal details
- Party: People's

Woraphop Viriyaroj (Thai: วรภพ วิริยะโรจน์) is a Thai politician and Member of Parliament for the People's Party.

== Career ==
In 2023, Woraphop submitted a proposed amendment to Section 69 the Fisheries Executive Decree of 2015, which would allow the usage of fishing nets with a mesh smaller than 2.5 centimeters during night time within 12 nautical miles of the short.

In 2025, Woraphop was critical of the Thai government's digital wallet scheme as a waste of taxpayer funds.

In August 2025, Woraphop was among three People's Party MPs sued for defamation by energy company Gulf Development, along with party leader Natthaphong Ruengpanyawut and Supachot Chaiyasat. Gulf Development is demanding compensation of 100 million Baht from each defendant.
