= Advanced Info Service =

Thai telecommunications company

Advanced Info Service Co., Ltd.
- Type: Public
- Traded as: SET: ADVANC
- ISIN: TH0268010Z03
- Industry: Telecommunications
- Founded: 24 April 1986; 40 years ago
- Founder: Thaksin Shinawatra
- Headquarters: Phaya Thai, Bangkok, Thailand
- Area served: Thailand
- Key people: Kan Trakulhoon (Chairman); Pratthana Leelapanang (CEO)
- Products: Mobile network, Internet service provider, Internet TV
- Services: Mobile telephony, Internet
- Revenue: ▲180.89 billion baht (2019)
- Operating income: ▲37.40 billion baht (2019)
- Net income: ▲31.19 billion baht (2019)
- Total assets: ▼289.67 billion baht (2019)
- Total equity: ▲69.39 billion baht (2019)
- Number of employees: 10,586+ (2013)
- Parent: Intouch Holdings
- Subsidiaries: Triple T Broadband (3BB); JASIF (Jasmine Broadband Internet Infrastructure Fund) (19%)
- Website: www.ais.th/en/

Advanced Info Service Co., Ltd. (AIS) is Thailand's largest GSM mobile phone operator with 39.87 million customers as of Q3 2016. Founded in April 1986, AIS started off as a computer rental business. In October 1990, it launched analog 900 MHz mobile phone services with a 20-year monopoly concession from the Telephone Organization of Thailand (TOT), and later became the first company allowed to operate on the GSM-900 frequency. It acquired Shinawatra Paging in June 1992.

The company is controlled by the Intouch Holdings (formerly Shin Corporation), headed by Temasek Holdings, a Singapore government-owned agency. AIS listed on the Stock Exchange of Thailand on 5 November 1991. As of 23 December 2011, Intouch holds 40.45 percent of the shares of the company and Singapore Telecommunications (also majority-held by Temasek) together with Thai Trust Fund and OCBC Nominees holds a 23.32 percent stake.

Temasek bought the AIS brand through the 2006 acquisition of the Shin Corporation from ousted former Prime Minister Thaksin Shinawatra.

In February 2014, in a conflict between the People's Democratic Reform Committee (PRDC) and Shinawatra, the PDRC called for a boycott of AIS, wrongly believing it to be owned by the Shinawatra family.

== Subsidiaries ==
- Advanced Contact Center Company Limited (ACC) – operate AIS Call Center 1175 and 1148
- Advanced Datanetwork Communications Company Limited (ADC) – provide online data communication service via telephone lines under the name "Datanet", licensed by TOT
- DataNetwork Solutions Company Limited (DNS) – provide online data communication service via telephone lines under the name "Datanet" in the provincial area
- mPay – payment processing and e-wallet service

=== mPay ===
mPay, an AIS subsidiary, is a payment processor and one of Thailand's three major payment service providers. Its partners include CIMB and 2C2P.

According to a 2014 article in The Nation, mPay has around 1.6 million registered users, of which roughly 1.2 million are end-users and 400,000 are mPay agents. 150,000 of mPay's end-users use the service monthly, spending on average 30,000 baht. In November 2015, four million people in Thailand used mPay, and in August 2013, mPay had around 700 merchant partners.

=== AIS Cloud ===
On 27 June 2025, AIS announced the launch of "AIS Cloud," a hyperscale cloud service, in Thailand, following a 4 billion baht investment. This service will utilize local data centers within Thailand and operates under Thai law. AIS Cloud is powered by Oracle Cloud Infrastructure and is noted as the first of its kind to be operated entirely by a Thai company. The Digital Economy Promotion Agency (depa) has awarded AIS Cloud the "dSURE 3-Star certification," the highest level of cloud service accreditation in the country. Corporate customers using AIS Cloud are expected to be eligible for tax incentives.

== Services and coverage ==
As of August 2019, AIS is the largest network in Thailand, with 40.1 million subscribers. In addition to post pay services, AIS offers prepaid services under the 1-2-Call brand.

Currently (2020) data is sold in time-based, volume-based and unlimited packages.

AIS operates 2G, 3G WCDMA/HSPA+, LTE, 5G NR, NB-IoT, and eMTC networks.

Frequencies used by AIS's Network in Thailand
| Frequency | Frequency band | Frequency width (MHz) | Generation | Radio interface | Notes |
|---|---|---|---|---|---|
| 700 MHz | 28/n28 | 20 | 4G & 5G | LTE & NR | |
| 900 MHz | | GiLTE | 2G | GSM/GPRS/EDGE | |
| 900 MHz | 8 | 10 | 3G | UMTS/HSPA | |
| 900 MHz | 8 | 10 | 4G | LTE | |
| 1800 MHz | 3 | 20 | 4G | LTE | (main frequency) |
| 2100 MHz | 1 | 10 | 3G | UMTS/HSPA | |
| 2100 MHz | 1 | 20 | 4G | LTE | |
| 2600 MHz | 41/n41 | 100 (TDD) | 4G & 5G | LTE & NR | dynamic spectrum sharing |
| 26 GHz | n258 | 1200 | 5G | NR | |

=== Wi-Fi hotspots ===
AIS owns and operates more than 100,000 Wi-Fi hotspots under the name "AIS SUPER WIFI."

=== Next G ===
In 2017 AIS announced it has teamed up with Samsung Electronics to combine Wi-Fi and LTE in a gigabit-speed mobile service called AIS Next G. The new network is estimated to be 15 times faster than the existing LTE and four times faster than the tri-band LTE-A, the fastest wireless network currently available in Thailand.

=== AIS Play ===
AIS Play was launched on 1 February 2017, serving as Thai's first OTT platform with 4K resolution and VOD, which featured AIS Play Originals (most of which are Boys Love series, such as Oh! My Sunshine Night, I'm Tee, Me Too, War of Y, Not Me and even Thai adaptation of Love Stage!!).

There are over 100 free-to-air channels, including some local channels, available to stream. There is also premium channels included with their Play Premium or Play Premium Plus subscription, such as HBO Asia, Discovery Channel Asia, Bein Sports, Nickelodeon, among others. They also provide streaming app, such as Disney+, Netflix, Prime Video, Viu, WeTV, iQiyi and many more.

In 2021, AIS partnered with Thai League 1, Thailand's top-tier football league, to broadcast their matches through their AIS Play application. The deal covered the whole 2021–2022 season and also included matches played in Thai League 2 and Thai League 3. Additionally, the Thai FA CUP was also broadcast on AIS Play.
