= Intouch Holdings =

Thai holding company

- Company type: Holding company (Public)
- Traded as: SET: INTUCH
- Industry: Technology
- Founded: 21 June 1983; 42 years ago
- Founder: Thaksin Shinawatra
- Headquarters: Chatuchak, Bangkok
- Key people: Phillip Tan Chen Chong (president)
- Revenue: ▲25.26 billion baht (2014)
- Net income: ▲14.76 billion baht (2014)
- Total assets: ▲54.69 billion baht (2014)
- Parent: Gulf Energy Development (42.25%)
- Subsidiaries: Advanced Info Service; Thaicom; ITAS; Intouch Media; ITV; Matchbox
- Website: intouchcompany.com

Intouch Holdings PCL (Thai: บริษัท อินทัช โฮลดิ้งส์ จำกัด (มหาชน); formerly Shin Corporation) is a Thai holding company which focuses on the telecommunication industry. It is the parent company of Advanced Info Service (AIS), the largest mobile phone operator in Thailand, and Thaicom, Thailand's satellite operator. It is listed in the Stock Exchange of Thailand and is part of SET50 index.

The company was founded as "Shinawatra Computer Service and Investment" by Thaksin Shinawatra, who later became the Prime Minister of Thailand. The sale of Shinawatra family's stake in Shin Corporation to Singapore's Temasek Holdings in 2006 sparked controversy, which intensified the anti-Thaksin movement.

Shin Corporation rebranded itself to Intouch in 2011, including its new stock symbol, but did not officially change its registered name until March 2014.

== History ==
=== The early years, 1983–2006 ===
The company was founded in 1983 as Shinawatra Computer by Thaksin Shinawatra, future Prime Minister of Thailand. The company changed its name in 1999, drawing the name "Shin" from the first four letters of Shinawatra's last name.

For its services it received the Royal Warrant on 11 June 2004, which gave it permission to display the royal Garuda emblem.

=== Divestment and transition to InTouch PCL, 2006–2011 ===
On 23 January 2006, the Shinawatra family sold its 49.6 percent stake in the company to nominees of Temasek Holdings, the Singapore government's investment arm, for US$1.88 billion. The 2006 sale of the Shinawatra family's share caused controversy in Thailand. The sale was in response to long-standing criticisms that the Shinawatra family's holdings created a conflict of interest for Thai Prime Minister Thaksin Shinawatra. Critics of the sale focused on allegations directed toward Thaksin and a compliant government that the transaction was exempt from capital gains tax, the fact that the Thai company was sold to a Singaporean company, and the fact that the Thai law regarding foreign investments in the telecom sector had been amended just prior to the sale.

The company is linked by stock control to companies including Shin Satellite and Advanced Info Service. It also holds stakes in Thai AirAsia, a consumer finance company, and ITV, a local television station.

The company's operations are divided into four lines of business: wireless telecommunications; satellite and international business; media and advertising; E-business.

=== InTouch PCL, 2011–present ===
On 1 April 2011 the company changed its logo and symbol on Stock Exchange of Thailand to (SET: INTUCH). On 5 August 2021 Gulf Energy Development has made a conditional voluntary tender offer of Intouch Holdings or INTUCH at a price of 65 baht per share. When combined with INTUCH shares that GULF already holds 606,878,314 shares or 18.93% share, Gulf Energy Development becomes INTUCH shareholder totaling 1,354,752,952 shares, becoming the major shareholder with 42.25% of issued and paid-up shares then all.

== Wireless telecommunications ==
=== Advanced Info Services PCL (SET:ADVANC, common name: AIS) ===
Thailand's largest mobile operator, AIS was originally granted a 20-year mobile concession by the Telephone Organization of Thailand (TOT) on 27 March 1990. On 26 September 1996, an additional five years were granted whereby extending the concession life to 25 years, expiring in the year 2016. The memorandum of agreements attached thereto is based on the "build-transfer-operate" (BTO) principle. Products: GSM Advanced Evolution (Postpaid, 900 MHz), GSM 1800 (Postpaid, 1800 MHz), One-2-Call (Prepaid, 900 MHz), Swasdee (Prepaid, 900 MHz) and Mobilelife (mobile content services)

== Satellite and international business ==
=== Thaicom PCL ===
Thaicom (SET: THCOM) was originally called Shinawatra Satellite. It was founded in 1991 after it was granted a license from Thailand's Ministry of Transport and Communications permitting it to launch and operate satellites. It was the first company in Thailand to be allowed to do this, and the first privately owned satellite company in Asia. King Bhumibol Adulyadej provided a name for the satellite series name, "Thaicom" (it comes from "Thai Communications"), symbolising the link between Thailand and modern communications technology. Shin Satellite has five satellites in geostationary orbit: Thaicom 1, Thaicom 2, Thaicom 3, Thaicom 4 or IPSTAR, and Thaicom 5, with corresponding Thai-based customer service facilities.

== Media and advertising ==
=== ITV Public Company Limited (SET:ITV) ===
Formerly named "Siam Infotainment Company Limited". ITV was granted a 30-year concession by the Office of the Permanent Secretary to the Prime Minister's Office in 1995 to operate a free-to-air television station in the ultra high frequency (UHF) spectrum at 510–790 MHz.

=== SC Matchbox Company Limited (SMB) ===
Established in April 1991, SMB is an advertising agency.

== E-business and others ==
=== IT Applications and Services Company Limited (ITAS) ===
ITAS was first established in January 2000 to provide application services for SHIN and its subsidiaries. After certifying as SAP National Implementation Partner, ITAS has offered its services to external customers and from then on ITAS has added more to its E-business products and services.

=== Teleinfo Media Company Limited (TMC) ===
Formerly known as "Shinawatra Directories Co., Ltd.", TMC is the only printer and publisher of both "white pages" and "Yellow Pages" telephone directories in Thailand.

=== AD Venture Company Limited (ADV) ===
ADV engages in developing Internet-related services, such as Internet service via mobile phones, satellites, and digital TV.

=== Shineedotcom Company Limited (Shinee) ===
Shinee is a service provider of content and application development for wireless communications.

=== Merry International Investment Corporation (MERRY STAKE) ===
MERRY is a holding company, registered in the Republic of Mauritius with registered capital of US$100,000, with a paid-up capital of US$1.

=== Capital OK Company Limited ===
Capital OK provides financial services such as personal loan, credit cards, and digital cash card via its subsidiary, Payment Solution Company Limited.

=== Thai AirAsia Company Limited ===
Shin Corporation holds a 49 percent share in a company called Asia Aviation, which in turn holds a 50 percent stake in the low-cost airline Thai AirAsia, a joint venture with AirAsia Berhad from Malaysia.

== Lawsuit ==
On 16 July 2003, the Thai Post published comments from media rights advocate Supinya Klangnarong, who said that the Shin Corporation, at the time majority owned by the family of Thai Prime Minister Thaksin Shinawatra, had benefited because of favourable policies by the Thaksin government. Shin Corporation sued for libel in criminal court and sought 400 million baht in compensation in a civil lawsuit. Supinya and the Thai Post were named as co-defendants. After the Thaksin family sold its shares in Shin Corp to Singapore's Temasek Holdings, the company offered to drop the lawsuit on the condition that Supinya apologise for her comments. Supinya refused the offer.

On 14 March 2006, the Criminal Court threw out the criminal lawsuit, saying the article in the Thai Post was presented in good faith and in the public's best interest. On 8 May 2006, Shin Corp. asked that the civil lawsuit be withdrawn. Neither Supinya nor Thai Post had any objections, so the court withdrew the civil suit.

== Company logo ==
Previous Logo

Current Logo, changed on

== See also ==
- 2006 sale of the Shinawatra family's share
