= Sale of Shin Corporation to Temasek Holdings =

2006 controversy in Thailand

The 2006 sale of the Shinawatra family's share of Shin Corporation (ShinCorp) to Temasek Holdings caused great controversy in Thailand. The sale was in response to long-standing criticisms that the Shinawatra family's holdings created a conflict of interest for Thai Prime Minister Thaksin Shinawatra. Criticisms of the sale focused on the insistence by Thaksin and a compliant government that the transaction was exempt from capital gains tax (as per Revenue Department and Stock Exchange of Thailand regulations, later determined by Thai courts not to be legal), the fact that the Thai company was sold to a Singaporean company, and the fact that the Thai law regarding foreign investments in the telecom sector had been amended just prior to the sale (although the amendment had been proposed since 2001). Thaksin's sale also impacted holdings, among other parties, of the Crown Property Bureau that had an investment in Siam Commercial Bank that held ShinCorp stock.

== The sale of Shin Corporation to Temasek Holdings ==
On 23 January 2006, the Thai Telecommunication Act (2006) became effective, raising the limit on foreign holdings in telecom companies to 49 percent. The act replaced the Telecom Business Law, which took effect in November 2001, that put the foreign investment cap at 25 percent. At the time, AIS was 49 percent owned by the Shinawatra family. Competitors DTAC and TA Orange were 40 percent owned by Norway's Telenor and 49 percent owned by France's Orange. The law was not retroactive, thus DTAC and TA Orange criticised the government for discriminating against foreign investors and urged it to increase the cap.

On Monday, 23 January 2006, the Shinawatra family sold its remaining 49.6 percent stake in Shin Corporation to two nominees of Temasek Holdings (Cedar Holdings and Aspen Holdings). The Shinawatra and Damapong (Potjaman's maiden name) families netted about 73 billion baht (about US$1.88 billion). In accordance with Thai tax laws, they did not have to pay capital gains tax.

In an unrelated transaction, the two families had earlier not paid taxes when Thaksin transferred shares to his sister Yingluck Shinawatra and his wife, Potjaman Shinawatra, transferred shares to her brother Bannapoj Damapong. The tax exemption was granted on grounds that the transfer, at a par value of 10 baht, took place through the stock market.

Although the tax exemption was legal, the sale drew heavy criticism over Thaksin's ethics on the grounds that Shin Corp, a dominant player in Thailand's information technology sector, would be sold to an investment arm of the Government of Singapore.

The transaction was conducted via several holding companies, including Cypress Holdings, Kularb Kaew, and Cedar Holdings. Cypress Holdings, a unit of Temasek, owned 49 percent of the shares of Kularb Kaew, but had 90 percent of the voting rights. Kularb Kaew owned 41.1 percent of Cedar Holdings. Cedar Holdings held a 54.54 percent stake in Shin Corp. Indirectly, Kularb Kaew also directly owned another 22.4 percent of Shin Corp.

== Investigation ==
The Thailand Securities and Exchange Commission (SEC) investigated the transaction. "The investigation concluded that Prime Minister Thaksin Shinawatra and his daughter Pinthongta are clear from all wrongdoing," said SEC secretary-general Thirachai Phuvanatnaranubala on 23 February 2006. However, the SEC did find that Thaksin's son, Panthongtae, violated rules with regard to information disclosure and public tender offers in transactions between 2000 and 2002. He was fined six million baht (about US$150,000). "The case is not severe because Panthongtae did inform the SEC but his report was not totally correct" said the SEC's deputy chief Prasong Vinaiphat.

Allegations of insider trading by the Shinawatra family, Shin Corporation Corp executives, and major shareholders were also investigated. No irregularities were found.

== Controversy ==
The transaction made the prime minister the target of accusations that he was selling an asset of national importance to a foreign entity, and hence selling out his nation. The Democrat Party spokesman called Thaksin worse than Saddam Hussian for not protecting the Thai economy from foreigners: "Dictator Saddam, though a brutal tyrant, still fought the superpower for the Iraqi motherland." Supporters, however, counter that Thailand's mobile phone industry is highly competitive, and that little criticism was raised when the Norwegian firm Telenor acquired Total Access Communications, the country's second largest operator. Democrat Party leader Abhisit Vejjajiva had criticised Thaksin earlier for not sufficiently opening up the Thai telecom sector to foreigners. Supporters further counter that the complete sale of Shin Corporation by the Shinawatra-Damapong families had been a long-standing demand of some public groups, as it would allow Thaksin to undertake his duties as prime minister without accusation of conflicts of interest.

The controversy surrounding the sale gave additional momentum to an already-planned anti-Thaksin rally, which took place on 4–5 February at the Royal Plaza, near the parliament building and the royal palace. At least 20,000 protesters, led by media figure Sondhi Limthongkul, gathered demanding the resignation of the prime minister, and submitted a petition to the Privy Council chairman General Prem Tinsulanonda and the Office of His Majesty's Principal Private Secretary, intended for King Bhumibol Adulyadej. Rallies also took place in several southern provinces.

The resulting political turmoil forced Thaksin to order the dissolution of the lower house on 24 February 2006.

== Use of nominees ==
Kularb Kaew and Cedar Holdings were holding companies used to acquire Shin Corp. Kularb Kaew was, in turn, owned by a small group of Thai nominee shareholders, including Pong Sarasin, a son of the former Thai prime minister and the brother of Arsa Sarasin, King Bhumibol's principal private secretary. Other owners of Cedar are Temasek and Siam Commercial Bank, in which King Bhumibol's Crown Property Bureau has a controlling stake. SCB also played a crucial role advising and providing financial support for the deal.

This use of local nominees of foreign owners was attacked by some anti-Thaksin groups as a method to get around laws limiting foreign ownership of Thai companies. Subsequent investigations found that Thai nominees owned 24.1 percent of all shares on the Thai stock exchange, and up to 36 percent of all shares in the technology sector. Efforts to clamp down on use of Thai nominees could potentially cause a significant outflow of capital from Thailand.

== After the coup ==
On 16 October 2006, nearly a month after a military junta overthrew the government of Thaksin Shinawatra in a coup, Temasek issued a statement to signal the eventual reduction in its holding in Shin Corp. However, the government said that it would continue with its legal action to follow up on its investigation of whether Kularb Kaew is a nominee of Temasek.

Chairman Pong Sarasin was later removed from the board of directors, and replaced by Tongnoi Tongyai, the private secretary of Crown Prince Maha Vajiralongkorn. The Crown Prince's office later declared that Tongyai had never been the secretary of the crown prince, but was only a low ranking officer in the office.

The junta's interpretation of the Foreign Business Act of 1999, which defines nominees and limits foreign investment in Thai companies, could have far reaching consequences for foreign investment in Thailand.

=== 5th arrest warrant ===
Supreme Court Criminal Division for Holders of Political Positions Judge Pongphet Vichitchonchai (of a nine-judge panel, with the concurrence of Justice Pornpetch), on 15 October 2008, issued a fifth arrest warrant against Thaksin, for failure to appear at the hearing of his "Sale of Shin Corporation to Temasek Holdings" case, due to self-imposed exile in London.
