= The Diamond of Umadevi =

Novel by Phanomthian, serialised 1964–1990

The Diamond of Umadevi (Thai: เพชรพระอุมา) is the longest adventure novel in Thailand, and is considered to be the longest novel in the world. Written by Phanomthian, the pen name of Chatchai Wisetsuwannaphum, the story was originally serialized in weekly magazines and later ran continuously in daily newspapers, spanning a writing period of over 25 years. Phanomthian began writing the novel on November 19, 1964, and completed the entire story on June 21, 1990, making the total writing duration 25 years, 7 months, and 2 days.

The novel has been reprinted multiple times as a 48-volume paperback collection by Na Baan Wannagarm Publishing, with the copyright retained by Phanomthian. Originally, it was published as a 53-volume hardcover edition, with each volume averaging 33 printer’s sheets (octavo format, or 16 pages per sheet), totaling approximately 1,749 sheets. This original edition was divided into three parts: Part One (24 volumes), Part Two (15 volumes), and Part Three (14 volumes). However, the contents were later consolidated, reducing the total to the current 48 volumes. The current edition is divided into two parts: Part One (24 volumes, 6 episodes) and the Complete Part (24 volumes, 6 episodes). This consolidated paperback collection was first published in 1995, the second edition released in 1998. The original manuscript was later revised for the third edition, which was published in 2001, and the fourth edition, which is the most recent, was published in 2004. Additionally, an eBook version was released by Amarin Publishing in 2013.

Phanomthian drew the plot outline of the novel from King Solomon's Mines, an adventure novel by Sir H. Rider Haggard set in the mysterious jungles of the African continent.

== Origins ==
Phanomthian began writing the novel in 1964 under a contract with Phanfah Pitaya Publishing (which has since ceased operations) to produce a single jungle adventure story with a strict length constraint of only 8 volumes. However, due to its overwhelming popularity, he had to extend the story to 10 volumes before attempting to conclude it as initially contracted. However, Phanfah Pitaya Publishing refused to let him stop and requested an additional 5 volumes, citing the story's surging popularity. By the time the 10th volume neared completion, reader demand had grown so rapidly that multiple reprints were required to keep up. Consequently, the novel's publication and distribution statistics soared. It received a warm reception from multiple generations of readers, who actively helped refine the narrative by notifying Phanomthian of any continuity errors regarding character names or locations.

The Diamond of Umadevi was then released in a pocketbook format every 10 days. The narrative continued past the 40th volume and eventually extended to 98 volumes, yet the story was still unable to reach its conclusion. Upon the release of the 99th pocketbook volume on February 11, 1970, the story transitioned to a continuous serialization in Chakrawan Weekly for 5 years starting in 1970, followed by another 6-year run in the Daily News starting in 1975. Despite this, Phanomthian was still unable to conclude the jungle adventure. The novel was subsequently serialized in Chakrawan Puen for another 8 years starting in 1982, until the entire story finally reached its conclusion in 1990.

=== Length ===
The composition of the novel spanned a period of over 25 years. This extensive timeframe stemmed from Phanomthian’s career as a professional writer who prioritized the readers above all else in his work. For Phanomthian, nothing brought greater professional fulfillment than knowing his work remained popular and eagerly followed by readers. Consequently, the narrative of The Diamond of Umadevi was crafted through a blend of vivid imagination and detailed, firsthand jungle experience, resulting in the massive lengths of both Part One and the Complete Part. His ultimate goal was to allow readers to immerse themselves in the events, easily visualize the text, and emotionally connect with the characters and the progression of the story.
