= Siam Weekly Monitor =

Defunct newspaper in Bangkok, Thailand

- Type: Weekly newspaper
- Publisher: E. D'Encourt
- Editor: E. D'Encourt
- Founded: 22 May 1867
- Language: English
- Ceased publication: 29 August 1868
- Headquarters: Bangkok, Thailand

The Siam Weekly Monitor was an English-language weekly newspaper whose first issue was published in Thailand on 22 May 1867. The American national E. D'Encourt was its editor, proprietor and editor until it ceased publication on 29 August 1868.

== See also ==
- Timeline of English-language newspapers published in Thailand
- List of online newspaper archives - Thailand
