= Chiang Rai (disambiguation) =

Chiang Rai may refer to these places in Thailand:

- Chiang Rai, a town
- Chiang Rai province
- Mueang Chiang Rai district
- Chiangrai Prachanukroh Hospital
- Chiang Mai University
- Chiang Rai International Airport
- Chiang Rai Witthayakhom School
- Chiang Rai Times
- Chiangrai United F.C.
- Chiangrai Lanna F.C.
- Chiangrai City F.C.
- Chiangrai TSC F.C.
- Chiangrai Province Stadium
- Chiang Rai subdistrict
