= Siam Free Press =

Defunct newspaper in Bangkok, Thailand

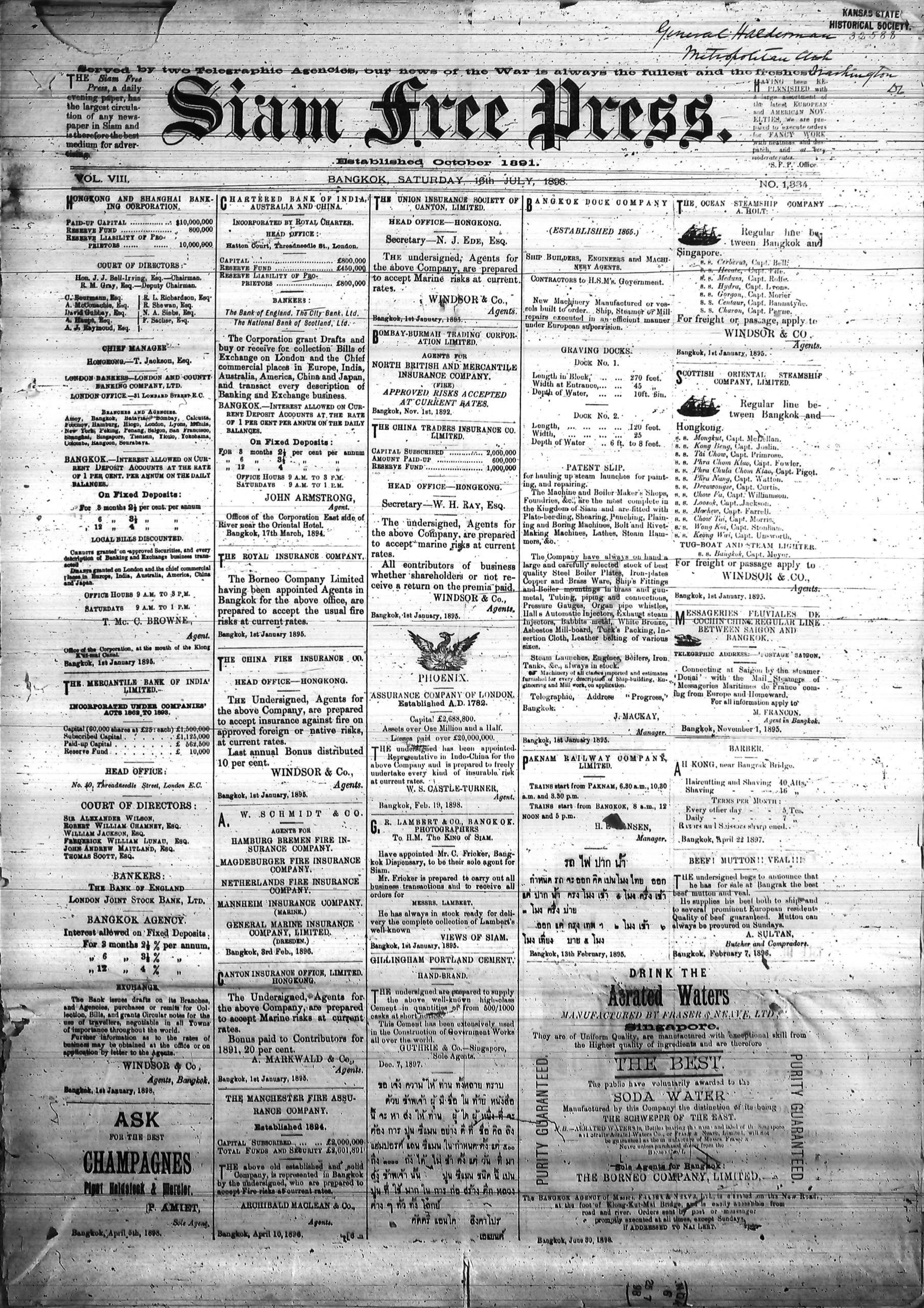
- 16 July 1898 issue of Siam Free Press
- Type: Daily (except Sunday) newspaper
- Editor: Michael O'Leary Dempsey
- Founded: October 1891
- Language: English
- Ceased publication: 10 January 1910
- Headquarters: Bangkok, Thailand

The Siam Free Press was an English-language daily newspaper in Thailand founded in 1891 by Mr. John Joseph Lillie. The Siam Free Press was preceded by The Siam Mercantile Gazette. Due to a hostile attitude towards the Siamese Government and the Monarchy taken by the Siam Free Press, Mr. J.J. Lillie was expelled from the country by order of King Chulalongkorn by a decree dated 12 March 1898. The newspaper was then sold by public auction and bought by Mr. Chalant, a Frenchman. In June 1901, the editor of the Siam Free Press was Mr. Michael O'Leary Dempsey.

Having been bought by a new company, the Siam Free Press altered its name to the Bangkok Daily Mail at the beginning of January 1910.

== See also ==
- Timeline of English-language newspapers published in Thailand
- List of online newspaper archives - Thailand
- Mass media in Thailand
