= The Bangkok Tribune =

Defunct newspaper in Bangkok, Thailand

- 22 February 1955 issue of The Bangkok Tribune
- Type: Daily newspaper (except Sunday until 1954 then except Monday from 1955 onwards)
- Editor: Plang Phloyphrom
- Founded: 21 September 1950
- Political alignment: pro-government
- Language: English
- Ceased publication: 1958
- Headquarters: Bangkok, Thailand

The Bangkok Tribune was an English-language daily newspaper in Thailand founded on 21 September 1950. Its editor from December 1950 until June 29, 1951, was Ms Christine Diemer. Mr Plang Ployphrom who was until then Associate editor became the new editor.^{[a]}The Bangkok Tribune was a pro-government newspaper and was owned by Plaek Phibunsongkhram, who at the time of publication, was serving his second term as Prime Minister of Thailand from 8 April 1948 until 16 September 1957. According to Ms Christine Diemer: "The Bangkok Tribune had two policies - to oppose Communism and to cement relations between Siam and the democracies."The Bangkok Tribune likely ceased publication in January 1958. The newspaper measured 391 mm x 545 mm and was eight pages long as of 1951.^{[b]}

== See also ==
- Timeline of English-language newspapers published in Thailand
- List of online newspaper archives - Thailand

== Notes ==
^{a} As mentioned on page 4 of The Bangkok Tribune published on Wednesday 4 July 1951. ^{b} Measurements were made on the issue of the Bangkok Tribune published on Friday 1 June 1951. The definite article "The" was not included in the title as of 1951.
