= The Siam Mercantile Gazette =

Defunct newspaper in Bangkok, Thailand

Siam Mercantile Gazette
- Type: Weekly newspaper
- Editor: John Marshall
- Founded: 6 October 1888
- Ceased publication: November 1891
- Language: English
- Headquarters: Bangkok, Thailand

The Siam Mercantile Gazette was an English-language weekly newspaper published in Thailand from 6 October 1888 until November 1891. Its proprietor and manager was Mr. Richard Götte and its editor was Mr. John Marshall. On 1 October 1891, Mr. J.J. Lillie became editor of the newspaper. On 19 November 1891, Mr. Richard Götte was found guilty of disseminating a libel upon Mr. Bethge, the Director-General of Siamese Railways, by means of two articles which appeared in the issue published on 24 October 1891. The Siam Mercantile Gazette was succeeded by the Siam Free Press.

== See also ==
- Timeline of English-language newspapers published in Thailand
- List of online newspaper archives - Thailand
