= Public holidays in Thailand =

Public holidays in Thailand are regulated by the government, and most are observed by both the public and private sectors. There are usually nineteen public holidays in a year, but more may be declared by the cabinet. Other observances, both official and non-official, local and international, are observed to varying degrees throughout the country.

All public holidays are observed by government agencies, while the Bank of Thailand regulates bank holidays, which differ slightly from those observed by the government. Private businesses are required by the Labour Protection Act to observe at least 13 holidays per year, including National Labour Day, but may choose the other observances they follow. If a holiday falls on a weekend, one following workday is observed by the government as a compensatory holiday.

== Public holidays ==
As of May 2019, there are 19 annual public holidays adopted by the cabinet:

Date	Name	Local name	Remarks
1 January	New Year's Day	วันขึ้นปีใหม่ (Wan Khuen Pi Mai)	Celebrates the start of the solar and Gregorian year. From 1889 to 1941, this was held on 1 April.
Full moon, 3rd Thai lunar month (February)^{a}	Magha Puja^{b}	วันมาฆบูชา (Wan Makhabucha)	Buddhist observance commemorating the Buddha's teaching of Ovada Patimokkha.
6 April	Chakri Memorial Day	วันจักรี (Wan Chakri)	Commemorates the establishment of the Chakri Dynasty and the founding of Bangkok by King Phutthayotfa Chulalok in 1782. Officially known as King Phutthayotfa Chulalok the Great Day and Chakri Dynasty Memorial Day (วันพระบาทสมเด็จพระพุทธยอดฟ้าจุฬาโลกมหาราชและวันที่ระลึกมหาจักรีบรมราชวงศ์).
13–15 April	Songkran Festival	วันสงกรานต์ (Wan Songkran)	Traditional Thai new year, and the major holiday of the year. Many people return home for family reunions during this period. The first day is known as วันมหาสงกรานต์ (Wan Maha Songkran), the second as วันเนา (Wan Nao), and the third as วันเถลิงศก (Wan Thaloeng Sok). The 14th is also observed as Family Day.
4 May	Coronation Day	วันฉัตรมงคล (Wan Chattramongkhon)	Commemorates the coronation of King Maha Vajiralongkorn in 2019 and of his father, King Bhumibol Adulyadej, in 1950. Previously held on 5 May; cancelled in 2017 and re-established on 4 May in 2019 (beginning 2020).
May, arbitrary date	Royal Ploughing Ceremony and Farmer's Day^{c}	วันพืชมงคล (Wan Phuetchamongkhon)	Ceremony giving blessing to the country's farmers. Officially known as วันพระราชพิธีพืชมงคลจรดพระนังคัลแรกนาขวัญ (Wan Phra Ratcha Phithi Phuetcha Monkhon Lae Charot Phra Nangkhan Raek Na Khwan). Also observed as Farmer's Day. Each year's date is astrologically determined and announced by the Bureau of the Royal Household.
Full moon, 6th Thai lunar month (May)^{a}	Vesak^{b}	วันวิสาขบูชา (Wan Wisakhabucha)	Buddhist observance commemorating the birth, enlightenment and passing of the Buddha. Also observed as National Tree Day.
3 June	Queen Suthida's Birthday	วันเฉลิมพระชนมพรรษาสมเด็จพระนางเจ้าสุทิดา พัชรสุธาพิมลลักษณ พระบรมราชินี (Wan Chaloem Phra Chonmaphansa Somdet Phra Nang Chao Suthida Phatcharasutha Phimon Lak Phra Borommarachini)	Commemorates the birth of Queen Suthida in 1978
28 July	King's Vajiralongkorn Birthday	วันเฉลิมพระชนมพรรษาพระบาทสมเด็จพระวชิรเกล้าเจ้าอยู่หัว (Wan Chaloem Phra Chonmaphansa Phrabat Somdet Phra Vajira Klao Chao Yu Hua)	Commemorates the birth of King Maha Vajiralongkorn in 1952
Full moon, 8th Thai lunar month (July)^{a}	Asalha Puja^{b}	วันอาสาฬหบูชา (Wan Asanhabucha)	Buddhist observance commemorating the Buddha's first discourse, the Dhammacakkappavattana Sutta
First waning moon, 8th Thai lunar month (July)^{a}	Beginning of Vassa^{b}^{c}	วันเข้าพรรษา (Wan Khao Phansa)	Buddhist observance marking the beginning of Vassa, also known as Buddhist Lent
12 August	The Queen Mother's Birthday	วันเฉลิมพระชนมพรรษาสมเด็จพระนางเจ้าสิริกิติ์ พระบรมราชินีนาถ พระบรมราชชนนีพันปีหลวง (Wan Chaloem Phra Chonmaphansa Somdet Phra Nang Chao Sirikit Phra Borommarachininat Phra Borommaracha Chanini Phanpi Luang)	Commemorates the birth of Queen Mother Sirikit in 1932; also observed as National Mother's Day (วันแม่แห่งชาติ; Wan Mae Haeng Chat).
13 October	Navamindra Maharaj Day	วันนวมินทรมหาราช (Wan Nawaminthara Maharaj)	Commemorates the passing of King Bhumibol Adulyadej in 2016. Formerly known as King Bhumibol Adulyadej The Great Memorial Day
23 October	King Chulalongkorn Day	วันปิยมหาราช (Wan Piyamaharat)	Commemorates the passing of King Chulalongkorn in 1910.
5 December	King Bhumibol Adulyadej's Birthday	วันคล้ายวันพระบรมราชสมภพ พระบาทสมเด็จพระบรมชนกาธิเบศร มหาภูมิพลอดุลยเดชมหาราช บรมนาถบพิตร (Wan Khlai Wan Phra Boromracha Somphop Phrabat Somdet Phra Boromchanakathibet Maha Bhumibol Adulyadej Maharaj Borommanatbophit)	Commemorates the birth of King Bhumibol Adulyadej in 1927. Also observed as National Day and National Father's Day. The United Nations honoured the king for his work in soil science by naming his birthdate as World Soil Day.
10 December	Constitution Day	วันรัฐธรรมนูญ (Wan Ratthathammanun)	Commemorates the promulgation of the first permanent constitution in 1932.
31 December	New Year's Eve	วันสิ้นปี (Wan Sin Pi)	Final day of the solar year.

- ^aHolidays regulated by the Thai lunar calendar—the usual Gregorian months in which the dates fall are indicated in parentheses. In lunar leap years, these take place one month later.
- ^bAlcohol sales are prohibited on Buddhist holidays except in international airport duty-free shops.
- ^cNot observed by the Bank of Thailand and usually not observed by the private sector.

Prior to 2016, there were 16 annual public holidays. With the passing of King Bhumibol Adulyadej, the list of annual public holidays for 2017 was revised by the cabinet in April 2017. Coronation Day, which was previously observed on 5 May, was temporarily removed, but will be observed from 2020 onwards, with the new date of 4 May, which will be a double anniversary of the coronations of Kings Bhumibol Adulyadej (1950) and Vajiralongkorn (2019).

Two new public holidays from 2017 onwards are:

- 28 July: King Maha Vajiralongkorn's Birthday
- 13 October: Anniversary for the death of King Bhumibol Adulyadej

Chinese New Year, Eid ul-Fitr and Eid al-Adha are also observed as public holidays by government agencies in Narathiwat, Pattani, Yala and Satun Provinces (see below under § Other observances). Government offices under the Ministry of Defence and Ministry of Education may also observe the Thai Armed Forces Day (18 January) and Teachers' Day (16 January), respectively (see § National observances below).

== Bank holidays ==
Holidays observed by financial institutions (not to be confused with bank holidays in the United Kingdom) are regulated by the Bank of Thailand. These usually differ from government holidays in that banks do not observe the Royal Ploughing Ceremony day (Phuetchamongkhon) and the beginning of Vassa (Khao Phansa), but instead do observe 1 May as National Labour Day (see below under § National observances). Up until 2018, a mid-year bank holiday was also observed on 1 July (if that date did not fall on a weekend). (Prior to 2007, the beginning of Vassa was observed as a holiday rather than Asalha Puja.) Chinese New Year, Eid ul-Fitr and Eid al-Adha are also designated as holidays for financial institutions in Narathiwat, Pattani, Yala and Satun Provinces if they do not already fall on a weekend or holiday.

== National observances ==
These observances are regulated by the government, but are not observed as holidays. Actual observance varies, and some are only observed by specific sectors.

Date	Observance	Local name	Observed since	Remarks
2nd Saturday of January	National Children's Day	วันเด็กแห่งชาติ (Wan Dek Haeng Chat)	1966	Widely celebrated, especially by governmental agencies, with many activities for children. Observed on this day since 1965; was observed on the first Monday of October from 1955 to 1964.
13 January	National Aviation Day	วันการบินแห่งชาติ (Wan Kanbin Haeng Chat)	1995	Adopted 31 May 1994.
14 January	National Forest Conservation Day	วันอนุรักษ์ทรัพยากรป่าไม้ของชาติ (Wan Anurak Sapphayakon Pamai Khong Chat)	1990	Observance promoting the conservation of the nation's forests and the work against deforestation. Adopted 9 January 1990.
16 January	Teacher's Day	วันครู (Wan Khru)	1957	Honours teachers countrywide. Schools may observe this day as a holiday, especially those under the authority of the Office of the Basic Education Commission. Adopted 1 December 1956.
17 January	Ram Khamhaeng Day	วันพ่อขุนรามคำแหงมหาราช (Wan Pho Khun Ram Khamhaeng Maharat)	1989	Commemorates the day King Mongkut found Ram Khamhaeng Inscription in 1833, originally held on November 17, which was the day King Vajiralongkorn opened King Ramkhamhaeng the Great monument at Sukhothai Historical Park in 1983.
18 January	Royal Thai Armed Forces Day	วันกองทัพไทย (Wan Kongthap Thai)	1960	Commemorates King Naresuan's victorious elephant duel against the Burmese Uparaja, calculated to be in 1593. Observed on this date since 2007. Observed on 8 April from 1960 to 1980 (now observed as the foundation anniversary of the Ministry of Defense); observed on 25 January from 1981 to 2006.
2 February	Inventor's Day	วันนักประดิษฐ์ (Wan Nakpradit)	1995	Commemorates the patent registration of King Bhumibol's Chai Phatthana paddle wheel aerator in 1993. Adopted 10 May 1994.
3 February	Veterans' Day	วันทหารผ่านศึก (Wan Thahan Phan Suek)	1958	Commemorates the founding of the War Veterans Organization of Thailand. Remembrance ceremonies are held at Victory Monument. Adopted 13 February 1957.
6 February	Muay Thai's Day	วันมวยไทย (Wan Muay Thai)	2011	In honor of King Suriyentrathibodi. His talent in Muay Thai was evident This day celebrated on the day of his accession to the throne in 1703, with Muay Thai being glorified.
24 February	National Artist Day	วันศิลปินแห่งชาติ (Wan Sinlapin Haeng Chat)		National Artists are honoured on this day, which commemorates King Rama II's birth.
26 February	Cooperatives Day	วันสหกรณ์ (Wan Sahakon)	1967	Adopted 14 February 1967.
13 March	National Elephant Day	วันช้างไทย (Wan Chang Thai)	1999	The observance was suggested by the Asian Elephant Foundation of Thailand and submitted to the Coordinating Subcommittee for the Conservation of Thai Elephants. The date was chosen because the Royal Forest Department designated the white elephant as the national animal of Thailand on 13 March 1963. Adopted 26 May 1998.
31 March	King Nangklao Memorial Day	"วันที่ระลึกพระบาทสมเด็จพระนั่งเกล้าเจ้าอยู่หัว พระมหาเจษฎาราชเจ้า (Wan Thi Raluek Phra Bat Somdet Phra Nang Klao Chao Yu Hua Phra Maha Chetsadaratchao)"	1993	Commemorates the birth anniversary of King Rama III. Adopted 1 September 1992.
1 April	Civil Service Day	วันข้าราชการพลเรือน (Wan Kharatchakan Phonlaruean)	1979	Commemorates the enactment of the first Civil Service Act in 1928.
2 April	Thai Heritage Conservation Day	วันอนุรักษ์มรดกไทย (Wan Anurak Moradok Thai)	1995	Commemorates the birthday of Princess Sirindhorn.
2 April	National Children's Book Day	วันหนังสือเด็กแห่งชาติ	2005	Adopted 22 February 2005.
2 April	Reading Day	วันรักการอ่าน (Wan Rak Karn Arn)	2009	Commemorates the birthday of Princess Sirindhorn.
8 April	Anniversary of the Ministry of Defense	วันสถาปนากระทรวงกลาโหม	1981	Adopted 13 June 1980.
9 April	Royal Thai Air Force Day	วันกองทัพอากาศ (Wan Kongthap Akat)	1998	Foundation day of Royal Thai Air Force in 1937. Adopted 24 March 1998.
10 April	National Rubber Day	วันยางพาราแห่งชาติ	2005	Adopted 21 December 2004.
25 April	King Naresuan Day	วันสมเด็จพระนเรศวรมหาราช (Wan Somdet Phra Naresuan Maharat)	2005	State ceremony. Naresuan died in 1605. Adopted 29 November 2005.
30 April	Consumer Protection Day	วันคุ้มครองผู้บริโภค (Wan Khumkhrong Phuboriphok)		Observed since 1980.
1 May	National Labour Day	วันแรงงานแห่งชาติ (Wan Raeng-ngan Haeng Chat)	1972	Coincides with International Workers' Day. Observed as a holiday by the Bank of Thailand and the private sector. Adopted 16 April 1972.
10 May	Work Safety Day	วันความปลอดภัยในการทำงานแห่งชาติ (Wan Khwam Plod Bhai Nai Karn Tham Ngarn Haeng Chat)	1997	Commemorates Kader Toy Factory fire in 1993 by reminding the safety in work.
10 May	National Mangrove Forest Day	วันป่าชายเลนแห่งชาติ (Wan Pa Chai Len Haeng Chat)	2020	Remembering the day that His Majesty King Bhumibol Adulyadej gave a royal speech related to mangrove forests for the first time in 1991 and resulted in all sectors continually conserving mangrove forests.
14 May	Thai Buffalo Conservation Day	วันอนุรักษ์ควายไทย	2017	Adopted 7 March 2017.
30 May	King Prajadhipok Day	วันพระบาทสมเด็จพระปกเกล้าเจ้าอยู่หัว	2002	State ceremony. Adopted 7 May 2002.
9 June	Ananda Mahidol Day	วันที่ระลึกคล้ายวันสวรรคตพระบาทสมเด็จพระปรเมนทรมหาอานันทมหิดล พระอัฐมรามาธิบดินทร (Wan Thi Raluek Khlai Wan Sawankhot Phra Bat Somdet Phra Poramen Maha Ananthamahidon Phra Atthamaramathibodin)	2015	King Ananda Mahidol died in 1946. Adopted 12 May 2015.
25 June	National Iodine Day	วันไอโอดีนแห่งชาติ	2003	Commemorates the awarding of the ICCIDD Gold Medal to King Bhumibol Adulyadej in 1997. Adopted 27 August 2002.
26 June	Sunthorn Phu Day	วันสุนทรภู่ (Wan Sunthon Phu)		Commemorates the birth of Sunthorn Phu in 1786.
29 July	National Thai Language Day	วันภาษาไทยแห่งชาติ (Wan Phasa Thai Haeng Chat)	1999	King Bhumibol's public discorse with the Thai Language Club of the Faculty of Arts, Chulalongkorn University on 29 July 1962
1 August	Thai Women's Day	วันสตรีไทย (Wan Satri Thai)	2003	Honors Queen Mother Sirikit. Adopted 29 July 2003.
12 August	National Thai Textile Day	วันผ้าไทยแห่งชาติ (Wan Pha Thai Haeng Chat)	2022	In honor of Her Majesty Queen Mother Sirikit to promote and conserve Thai fabrics to become popular again And help promote career creation and generate income for people in the Thai fabric industry.
16 August	Thai Peace Day	วันสันติภาพไทย (Wan Santiphap Thai)	1995	Memorial Day honoring the anniversary since the conclusion of hostilities in World War II. Adopted 8 August 1995.
18 August	National Science Day	วันวิทยาศาสตร์แห่งชาติ (Wan Witthayasat Haeng Chat)	1982	Commemorates King Mongkut's prediction and observation of a total solar eclipse in 1868. Adopted 14 April 1982.
9 September	Huai Kha Khaeng Thung Yai Naresuan Wildlife Sanctuaries World Heritage Day	วันเขตรักษาพันธุ์สัตว์ป่าห้วยขาแข้ง ทุ่งใหญ่นเรศวร มรดกโลก	1995	Adopted 4 July 1995.
19 September	Thai Museum Day	วันพิพิธภัณฑ์ไทย	1995	Adopted 16 May 1995.
20 September	National Youth Day	วันเยาวชนแห่งชาติ (Wan Yaowachon Haeng Chat)		Commemorates the birth dates of Kings Chulalongkorn and Ananda Mahidol.
20 September	National Canal Conservation Day	วันอนุรักษ์รักษาดูคลองแห่งชาติ	1995	Adopted 29 August 1995.
21 September	National Fishing Day	วันประมงแห่งชาติ (Wan Pramong Haeng Chat)	1982	Coinciding with the establishment of the Department of Fisheries (Thailand) in 1926 by glorifying the fishery profession. Originally held on April 13.
24 September	Mahidol Day	วันมหิดล (Wan Mahidon)		Commemorates the passing of Prince Father Mahidol Adulyadej, the "Father of Thai Modern Medicine".
28 September	Thai National Flag Day	วันพระราชทานธงชาติไทย (Wan Phraratchathan Thongchat Thai)	2017	King Vajiravudh officially gave sanction to the current flag of Thailand in 1917. Adopted 20 September 2016.
1 October	King Rama IV Memorial Day	วันรัฐพิธีที่ระลึกพระบาทสมเด็จพระจอมเกล้าเจ้าอยู่หัว	2014	State ceremony. Adopted 22 July 2014. Observed on 18 October from 2011 to 2013.
14 October	14 October Democracy Day	วัน 14 ตุลา ประชาธิปไตย	2003	Commemorates the 14 October 1973 uprising. Adopted 26 August 2003.
17 October	National Police Day	วันตำรวจ (Wan Tamruat)	2017	Former 13 October (Since 1915–2016)
19 October	Thailand Technology Day	วันเทคโนโลยีของไทย (Wan Teknoloyi Khong Thai)	2001	Commemorating the day King Bhumibol Adulyadej conducted a demonstration of a new formula of artificial rain in 1972 by promoting the development of Thai technology.
21 October	National Social Work Day	วันสังคมสงเคราะห์แห่งชาติ (Wan Sangkhom Songkro Haeng Chat)	1985	Commemorates the birth of Srinagarindra the Princess Mother.
21 October	National Nurses' Day	วันพยาบาลแห่งชาติ (Wan Phayaban Haeng Chat)	1990	Commemorates the birth of Srinagarindra the Princess Mother. Adopted 4 April 1990.
21 October	National Annual Tree Loving Day	วันรักต้นไม้ประจำปีของชาติ	1990	Adopted 15 October 1990.
21 October	National Dental Hygiene Day	วันทันตสาธารณสุขแห่งชาติ	1989	Adopted 4 July 1989.
3rd Sunday of November	World Day of Remembrance for Road Traffic Victims	วันรำลึกผู้สูญเสียจากอุบัติเหตุทางถนนโลก	2013	Adopted 15 January 2013.
20 November	Royal Thai Navy Day	วันกองทัพเรือ (Wan Kong Thap Ruea)		Commemorates the opening of the Naval Academy at the former Royal Palace in 1906, marking the beginning of the modern navy.
25 November	King Vajiravudh Memorial Day	วันสมเด็จพระมหาธีรราชเจ้า (Wan Somdet Phra Maha Thirarat Chao)	2003	Commemorates the passing of King Vajiravudh in 1925. Adopted 2 September 2003.
25 November	Primary Education Day	วันประถมศึกษาแห่งชาติ (Wan Prathom Seuksa Haeng Chat)		In honor of King Vajiravudh who supported primary education. It was originally held on October 1 in the name of Public Education Day. which was the promulgation of the First Elementary Education Act in 1921.
27 November	National Health-Building Day	วันสร้างสุขภาพแห่งชาติ	2002	Adopted 19 November 2002.
1 December	Damrong Rajanubhab Day	วันดำรงราชานุภาพ (Wan Damrongrachanuphap)	2001	Commemorates the passing of Prince Damrong Rajanubhab. Adopted 27 November 2001.
4 December	Thai Environment Day	วันสิ่งแวดล้อมไทย (Wan Singwaetlom Thai)	1991	Adopted 12 November 1991.
16 December	National Sports Day	วันกีฬาแห่งชาติ (Wan Kila Haeng Chat)	1986	Commemorates King Bhumibol's gold medal in sailing at the 1967 Southeast Asian Peninsular Games.
28 December	King Taksin Memorial Day	วันที่ระลึกสมเด็จพระเจ้าตากสินมหาราช (Wan Thi Raluek Somdet Phra Chao Tak Sin Maharat)		Commemorates the accession of King Taksin in 1768.

== Other observances ==
Other observances, traditional and modern, are observed by various groups and communities throughout the country.

Date	Observance	Local name	Remarks
4 January	Cavalry and Armor Day	วันทหารม้า (Wan Thahan Ma)	Commemorates the bravery of King Taksin the Great, then Phraya Wachiraprakan, in the Battle of Ban Phran Nok in the Ayutthaya period, and the role of the Cavalry Branch of the Royal Thai Army in Thai military history.
17 January	National Dairy Day	วันโคนมแห่งชาติ (Wan Khonom Haeng Chat)	Marking the inauguration of the Thai-Danish Dairy Farming and Training Center on 16 January 1962 by King Bhumibol Adulyadej and King Frederik IX of Denmark. Observed since 1987.
1st day of the Chinese calendar (January, February)	Chinese New Year	วันตรุษจีน (Wan Trut Chin)	Observed by Thai Chinese and parts of the private sector. Usually celebrated for three days starting on the day before the Chinese New Year's Eve. Chinese New Year is observed as a public holiday in Narathiwat, Pattani, Yala, Satun and Songkhla Provinces.
2 February	National Agriculture Day	วันเกษตรแห่งชาติ (Wan Kaset Haeng Chat)	
10 February	Volunteer Defense's Day	วันอาสารักษาดินแดน (Wan Asa Raksa Dindaen)	Foundation day of Volunteer Defense Corps.
14 February	Valentine's Day	วันวาเลนไทน์	Western holiday devoted to romance and love, imported in recent decades. A popular day for weddings.
25 February	National Radio Day	วันวิทยุกระจายเสียงแห่งชาติ (Wan Witthayu Krachai Siang Haeng Chat)	Marking the foundation of State Radio Station Radio Thailand, then known as Radio Bangkok of Phaya Thai on 25 February 1930.
5 March	Journalist's Day	วันนักข่าว (Wan Nakkhao)	
8th waning moon, 6th Thai lunar month (May–June)^{a}	Atthami Puja	วันอัฐมีบูชา (Wan Atthamibucha)	Buddhist observance commemorating the Buddha's cremation.
5th day, 5th Chinese lunar month	Duanwu Festival	วันไหว้ขนมจ้าง (Wan Wai Khanom Chang)	Chinese festival
1 July	National Scout Organization Day	วันสถาปนาลูกเสือแห่งชาติ (Wan Sathapana Luksuea Haeng Chat)	King Vajiravudh founded the National Scout Organization of Thailand on this day in 1911.
15th day, 7th Chinese lunar month (August)^{a}	Ghost Festival	วันสารทจีน (Wan Sat Chin)	Known as Sat Chin to differentiate from Sat Thai (see below)
4 September	Royal Thai Navy Submarine Memorial Day	วันเรือดำน้ำไทย (Wan Ruea Dam Nam Thai)	
15 September	Silpa Bhirasri Day	วันศิลป์ พีระศรี (Wan Sin Phirasi)	
15th day, 8th Chinese lunar month (September)^{a}	Moon Festival	วันไหว้พระจันทร์ (Wan Wai Phrachan)	Chinese festival
New moon, 10th Thai lunar month (September–October)^{a}	Sat Thai Day	วันสารทไทย (Wan Sat Thai)	Traditional mid-year festival, now celebrated mostly in Nakhon Si Thammarat
1st–9th days, 9th Chinese lunar month (September–October)^{a}	Vegetarian Festival	เทศกาลกินเจ (Thetsakan Kin Che)	Usually corresponds with Sat Thai Day, depending on the differences between the Thai and Chinese lunar calendars.
Full moon, 11th Thai lunar month (October)^{a}	Pavarana/Wan Ok Phansa^{b}	วันออกพรรษา	Marks the end of the three-month Vassa and the beginning of the Kathina period the following day.
Full moon, 12th Thai lunar month (November)^{a}	Loy Krathong	วันลอยกระทง (Wan Loi Krathong)	Observed as Yi Peng festival (ยี่เป็ง) in Chiangmai.
20 November	Royal Thai Navy Day	วันกองทัพเรือ (Wan Kongthap Ruea)	Foundation day of Royal Thai Navy in 1906.
25 December	Christmas	วันคริสต์มาส	Christian holiday celebrating the birth of Jesus Christ. Religious for Christians and widely observed commercially.
1 Shawwal in the Islamic calendar	Eid al-Fitr	วันตรุษอีดิ้ลฟิตรี (วันรายอปอซอ)	Muslim holiday celebrating the end of the fasting month of Ramadan. Observed as a public holiday in Narathiwat, Pattani, Yala, Satun and Songkhla Provinces.
10 Dhu al-Hijjah in the Islamic calendar	Eid al-Adha	วันตรุษอีดิ้ลอัฎฮา (วันรายอฮัจยี)	Muslim holiday commemorating the willingness of Ibrahim to sacrifice his son Ismael as an act of obedience to Allah. Observed as a public holiday in Narathiwat, Pattani, Yala, Satun and Songkhla Provinces.

- ^aObservances regulated by the Thai or Chinese lunar calendars—the usual Gregorian months in which the dates fall are indicated in parentheses.
- ^bAlcohol sales are prohibited on Buddhist holidays except in international airport duty-free shops.

== See also ==
- Thai lunar calendar
- Thai solar calendar
