= Mass media in Thailand =

Thailand has a well-developed mass media sector, especially by Southeast Asian standards. The Thai government and the military have long exercised considerable control over the media, especially radio and television stations. During the governments of Thaksin Shinawatra and the subsequent military-run administration after the 2006 coup and military coup of 2014, the media in Thailand—both domestic and foreign—have suffered from increasing restrictions and censorship, sometimes subtle, sometimes overt.

In its Freedom of the Press 2017 report, Freedom House labeled the Thai press as "not free". Reporters Without Borders in 2021 ranked Thailand 137th out of 180 nations in press freedom, up three spots from 2020. Assaults on press freedom have continued in 2020, including self-censorship from mainstream media on the demands to reform the Thai monarchy during the 2020–2021 Thai protests.

On World Press Freedom Day 2015, four of Thailand's professional media organizations issued a joint statement calling for the military government to revoke onerous press restrictions and cease political interference with the National Broadcasting and Telecommunications Commission of Thailand.

== Television ==
Television is by far the most popular medium in Thailand. Almost 80% of Thais are estimated to rely on television as their primary source of news. Major television stations are owned and controlled by the Royal Thai Army, MCOT and government.

== Radio ==
Thailand has 204 AM stations, 334 FM stations, and six shortwave broadcasters (as of 2011). As is the case with television, radio broadcasting is supposed to be regulated by the Broadcasting Commission (NBC). However, because there were delays in establishing the NBC (now NBTC), radio frequencies had remained in the hands of several governmental agencies, including the military, police, state universities, The National Broadcasting and Telecommunications Commission, The Government Public Relations Department (PRD) (National Broadcasting Services of Thailand), and MCOT Public Company Limited. These agencies operate several stations directly while the remainder are leased out to private content providers.

Community radio stations operated with low-power transmitters have proliferated in the last few years, offering listeners an alternative to the government-controlled stations. However, the government has recently shut down many community radio stations on the grounds that they operated stronger transmitters than permitted, interfering with existing frequencies. On the other hand, critics of the government allege that the stations that were shut down were targeted because they featured programs that were critical of Prime Minister Thaksin Shinawatra's policies.

In Nakhon Ratchasima Province as well as in other locations, several community radio stations were shut down, after several warnings from governmental agencies, when it was proven that their signals were interfering with air traffic control and overlapping signals of other stations. It is estimated that there are 4,000 known "illegal" community radio stations in Thailand. Some critics claim that the actual number of "unlicensed" community radio stations are twice the government estimate. After Thaksin Shinawatra was removed from power, community radio activities were more and more attuned to address political controversies that had been spun off after the coup d'état of 2006.

The military junta parliament passed a Broadcasting Act of 2008 in December 2007. It came into force in March 2008. The new law revokes the old one which reserved monopoly rights in the broadcast sector to the government and governmental agencies. The new law requires that all broadcasters, stations, and operators have a license from the broadcasting regulator to be appointed by the senate.

In July 2008, the Juridical Council decided that by enactment of the new Broadcasting Act of 2008, all of the regulations, decisions, and administrative guidelines issued by virtue of the repealed Radio and Television Act ceased to exist as they were superseded by the new Broadcasting Act of 2008. The Juridical Council also ruled that, pending the establishment of NBC, TPBS is not subject to provisional authority of the Broadcasting Act 2008. As a result of the Juridical Council ruling, broadcasting in Thailand is free and unregulated. However, given the fact that all the existing radio stations belong to the Thai Government, military or security agencies, the issue of free speech or civil rights has never been challenged or tested in those "mainstream" radio stations. For television, all TV stations are either owned by government, the military, or subject to concession agreements which give de facto censoring power to the government as an owner.

As of June 2009, the National Telecommunications Commission as a temporary regulator/licensor for community radio and cable television, proposed the draft "Provisional CR License" and requested comment from the public. The regulation on CR Temporary License became effective on 25 July 2009 and the first license could be issued 30 days following the effective date. The provisional license will be in force for 300 days but can be renewed for another similar period or until the new regulator comes into existence.

In December 2010, the parliament passed a new law which would forever change the landscape of radio and television services in Thailand. The new NBTC would be created to oversee both telecommunications and broadcast sector in Thailand. The key task of the NBTC is to reform the AV spectrum and reassign spectrum for different categories of use as prescribed by the 2008 act. Airwaves would be privatized according to Spectrum Master Plan and AV Master Plan to be adopted by NBTC. It is expected that the NBTC will replace NTC within 2011. The implication of having an independent media and telecom regulator in a single body is very profound. First, the regulator is tasked with privatization of the airwaves in AV sector. This is the most challenging task of the NBTC, i.e., taking away radio and TV from government and reallocating and reassigning spectrum for private, commercial, and societal use. The Broadcasting Act of 2008 divides radio and TV licenses into three main categories: a) commercial, b) noncommercial/ public and, c) community. The commercial service license is subdivided into three classes which are i) national license, ii) regional license and, iii) local license.

As of July 2011, the first step of selection process was half-way complete, i.e., the first of the two name lists was finalized and was passed to the senate for selection. After the two name lists are combined, the senate will be notified and will eventually select NBTC from the two name lists. In August 2011, the two name lists were sent to the senate. The senate set up a special committee to recommend the nominees amidst allegations of wrongdoing and kick backs. The NBTC will consist of 11 members, five of whom will act as telecommunication commission, while another five commissioners will act as a broadcast commission. The chairman of NBTC is not allowed to sit in either commission.

In October 2011, the king signed in the royal appointment decree, giving birth to the first "convergence" regulator. Six out of 11 members are from the military or police while two are from civil society organizations. Three commissioners are former bureaucrats. One of the key tasks of the NBTC is to adopt at least three master plans. They are the Spectrum Master Plan, Broadcasting Master Plan, and Telecommunications Master Plan. NBTC published all three master plans at the same time to be promulgated in October 2012. In December 2013, NBTC launched the biggest auction in Thai media history for the new 24 DTTV. The first DTTV went on air in the second quarter of 2014. In May 2014, there was a coup d'état and the military Jjnta amended the NBTC Act to require the return of proceeds from the DTTV auction to the public purse. The junta also issued an amendment on community radio, which gives absolute power to NBTC to license (or revoke licenses) existing community radio stations.

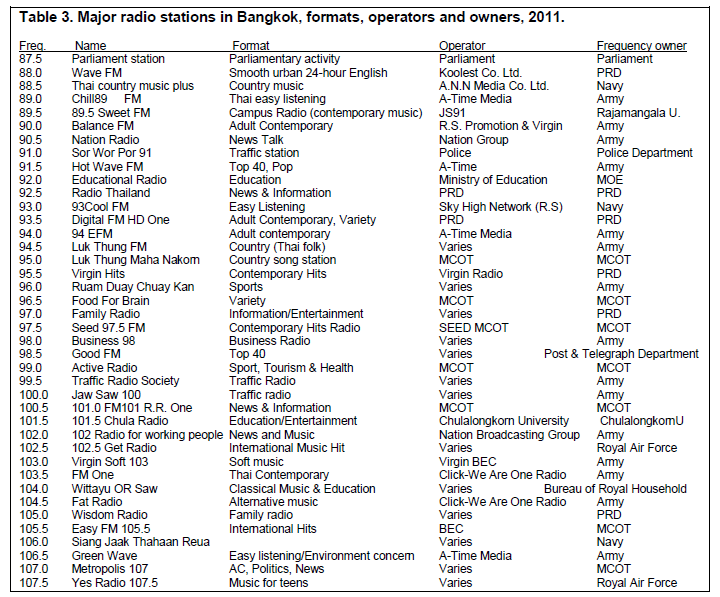
Major radio stations in Bangkok, formats, operators and owners, 2011. Table from reference item 6 (Wissesang & Freeman, 2012).

== Print media ==
Readerships for newspapers and magazines dropped by seven percent between 2013 and 2015. Only 50.1% of Thais aged 15–24 said they read magazines in 2015, down from 61.7% in 2013. Print subscriptions are declining as more people read on their mobile devices. Ad spending fell by 14.28% to 4.22 billion baht (US$118 million) for magazines and by 6.45% to 12.33 billion baht (US$345 million) for newspapers. Yet total ad spending for print is 16.55 billion baht (US$463 million), still higher than 9,869 million (US$276 million) in digital, according to Digital Advertising Association of Thailand.

Ad revenues for both newspapers and magazines has been in a nosedive since at least 2012. Ad spending in newspapers has declined from 15,183 million baht in 2012 to 8,164 in 2016 (as of October 2016). Magazine ad spending has declined from 5,221 million baht to 2,510 million baht over the same period.

=== Newspapers ===
In contrast to television, newspapers in Thailand are subject to little governmental supervision. Readers have a choice of numerous papers, ranging from sensationalist mass-circulation dailies to newspapers specializing in coverage of political and business. Since the country's modernization in the mid-nineteenth century, the Thai government started to issue newspapers. Due to the low literary rate among the Thai at the time, newspaper businesses were not profitable and many had to cease their circulation. The oldest newspaper of record, which is still in publication, is the Royal Thai Government Gazette which started its publication in 1858.

New restrictive guidelines for receiving and renewing foreign media work visas went into effect on 21 March 2016. At the time, there was concern from journalists that the guidelines would effectively end the longstanding role of the country as a benign host for freelance reporters and photographers.

Thailand's so-called "business newspapers" also include substantial coverage of politics and culture. The two largest English newspapers are printed in broadsheet format, although there are several exceptions to this. These other mass-circulation newspapers are often referred to as "tabloids", and are the Phuket Gazette and Pattaya Mail.

With the exception of one newspaper in Chiang Mai and one in Hua Hin (Hua Hin Today), all daily papers are published in Bangkok and distributed to all parts of the country.

The political leanings of Thai newspapers can be categorized according to how they relate to the democracy movement of the 1970s. The mainstream print media are represented by Thai Rath and Daily News, which together account for half of Thailand's newspaper sales. Because both papers were founded while the country was still under military rule, by necessity, they cultivated good relationships with the army and elite bureaucracy. This has led them to develop an editorial outlook that tends to lean in favor of the status quo. Thus, these publications are viewed as "conservative" within the Thai political spectrum. On the other hand, newspapers that grew out of the student movement of the 1970s such as Matichon tend to adopt an anti-establishment outlook. Therefore, within the Thai political spectrum, they can be loosely characterized as "progressive."

The Thai newspaper industry's advertising revenues have declined continuously since 2013. Ad revenues of 15.4 billion baht in 2006 fell to 12.3 billion baht in 2015. Advertisers budgeted 20.1% less for newspaper buys in the first 11 months of 2016 compared to the same period in 2015, down to 8.89 billion baht. Thailand's leading journalism association observed that both newspaper sales and advertising revenues have been in "steep decline".

==== Mass circulation dailies ====
The Thai government's Public Relations Department publishes a detailed directory of all media in Thailand, listing latest registration information, including radio, TV, and printed media. All printed media are tightly owned by a single family or small groups of investors who share a familial relationship. None of these companies are publicly held, nor have a fiduciary duty to the public.

- Thai Rath (ไทยรัฐ) – Claiming a circulation of approximately one million, this is Thailand's most influential newspaper. Prominently features sensationalist stories on crime and accidents. Its political stance is moderately populist. High circulation is due to its stance on populist issues and its acceptance of the public opinion of the general population, in particular, the majority rural market.
- Daily News (เดลินิวส์) – Circulation is 850,000. Very similar in style and substance to Thai Rath, somewhat less successful than Thai Rath, because it has less news content.
- Khaosod (Thai: ข่าวสด, RTGS: khao sot) – The name translates as 'live news'. Founded on 9 April 1991, Khaosod is the youngest newspaper of Matichon Publishing Group, which also publishes two other daily news publications, Matichon Daily and Prachachat Business. Khaosod claims to be more "mass-oriented" and "upcountry-focused" than its sister newspapers. It sells 950,000 copies per day. Its editorial line is moderate to liberal. Keen on crime news, it also concentrates on environmental issues and the rights of ordinary people. Khaosod English was launched to bring Thai news to the world, making Khaosod the first Thai-language newspaper with an English version.
- Kom Chad Luek ('Sharp, Clear, Deep') (Thai: คมชัดลึก; RTGS: khom chat luek) – A mass-circulation, Thai-language daily, with circulation in the 900,000 range. Owned by the Nation Multimedia Group, it was launched in 2017. Its political stance is conservative, non-populist, and moderately anti-government. Hence most of its sales are to the relatively well-educated business and upper to middle income group, who generally support its conservative stance. It became solely an online newspaper with its last paper edition on 8 April 2020.
- Manager Daily (Thai: ผู้จัดการรายวัน; RTGS: phu chat kan rai wan) – An originally business-focus daily, in 2016 its circulation was 300,000. Considered the flagship publication of the Manager Group. Its political stance is ultra-conservative and authoritarian.who generally support its conservative stance. It became solely an online newspaper with its last paper edition on 1 August 2026.
- Naewna (Thai: แนวหน้า) – A Thai-language daily newspaper founded in 1980. It covers general news, opinion columns, and political commentary, and has been described as having a conservative editorial orientation. It also operates an online platform, Naewna Online, distributing content through social media channels.

==== Quality dailies ====
- Matichon (มติชน) – Has a circulation of approximately 900,000. The flagship publication of Matichon PLC, this paper is considered essential reading for Thailand's educated classes. Its editorial line is moderate to progressive.
- Naewna (แนวหน้า) – Estimated daily circulation was claimed to average 300,000 in 2002. Editorial line is ultraconservative and authoritarian.
- Thai Post (ไทยโพสต์) – Circulation is 30,000. It maintains a conservative editorial line.

==== Business dailies ====
- Krungthep Turakij (กรุงเทพธุรกิจ) – Circulation is 200,000. Owned by the Nation Multimedia Group. This paper is popular with Thai intellectuals. Its political stance is conservative.

==== Sports dailies ====
- Siam Sport Daily (สยามกีฬารายวัน) – Formerly the flagship sports daily newspaper of Siam Sport Syndicate, which ceased print publication in August 2023 to fully transition to digital media platforms.

==== English-language dailies ====
- BK Magazine – Online magazine and quarterly print magazine. It focuses on lifestyle, food, beverage, bar, nightlife, and restaurant news and events. It also does some current events and local Bangkok news and points of interest. It was previously bought by the now-defunct Coconuts Media, and the parent company is Thai language media outlet Soi Milk.
- Bangkok Post – Broadsheet and online. Circulation is approximately 70,000. Its major shareholders include the Chirathivat family (owners of Central Group), the South China Morning Post of Hong Kong and GMM Grammy PLC, a local media and entertainment firm. Maintains a conservative editorial line.
- Chiang Rai Times – The Chiang Rai Times is a Non-Profit English Language News portal that was introduced to the market place in 2007 to share local, regional and international news. Information that affects the local community covering politics, business, and social events.
- Khaosod English – Online only. Founded in 2013, it is the English-language edition of Khaosod. It provides daily coverage of politics, business, culture, tourism, and current affairs.
- The Nation – Online only. Broadsheet circulation was 68,000. It is the flagship publication of the Nation Multimedia Group and is the only Thai-owned English language newspaper. It became solely a digital newspaper with its last paper edition on 28 June 2019. According to its online competitor, Khaosod English, The Nation has a history of "reporting news from false and dubious sources."
- Prachatai English – Online only. An independent, non-profit, daily web newspaper established in June 2004 to provide reliable, relevant news to the Thai public during time of curbs on the independence of Thai news media.
- Thai Examiner – Online only. A newspaper established in June 2015, targeted for foreigners in Thailand and the Thai public. Their stated goal is "...to help foreigners develop a positive relationship with the kingdom"
- Thai Enquirer – Online only. An independent newspaper established in January 2020 intended to "provide a mixture of in-depth reporting, political and cultural commentary, as well as highlights of fiction, prose, poetry, and humour."
- Phuket Gazette — A weekly English language news paper founded in 1993 in Phuket. It was the Island's first English-languages newspaper. It ceased publication on 31 July 2017 and digital assets were later acquired by Digital Broker Ventures and rebranded as The Thaiger in 2018.
- The Thaiger — Online only. Founded in 2018 as a rebranding of Phuket Gazette. It covers Thai news, business, tourism, and entertainment.
- Pattaya Mail — Online only. Founded as a weekly English-language newspaper in 1993, it ceased print publication in 2023 and continues covering Pattaya, the Eastern Seaboard, and Thailand.
- International New York Times (INYT) – Ceased publication. The paper was known as the International Herald Tribune until 2013. The INYT ceased printing and distributing its print edition in Thailand at the end of 2015. Circulation was somewhere in the 5,000-10,000 range. A company spokesman attributed the move to the high and rising cost of operation in Thailand. The print edition will still be available in six other Southeast Asian nations: Singapore, Brunei, Malaysia, Indonesia, the Philippines, and Myanmar. Not long after the decision was taken, a front-page story in the Thailand edition of the INYT was left blank. In its place was a short message that read, "the article in this space was removed by our printer in Thailand. The International New York Times and its editorial staff had no role in its removal." The story that was removed was entitled, "Thai Economy and Spirits Are Sagging". It appeared in the 29 November 2015 edition of the New York Times. Later in the same week, an op-ed by Bangkok-based reporter Tom Felix Joehnk was omitted from the 4 December edition of the INYT by its Bangkok printer, Eastern Printing PCL. In a statement, the New York Times commented that, "This second incident in a week clearly demonstrates the regrettable lack of press freedom in the country. Readers in Thailand do not have full and open access to journalism, a fundamental right that should be afforded to all citizens."
  In September 2015, Eastern Printing declined to publish an entire issue of the International New York Times which contained an article entitled, "With King in Declining Health, Future of Monarchy in Thailand Uncertain".

==== German-language dailies ====
- Der Farang – German language, published every 14 days.

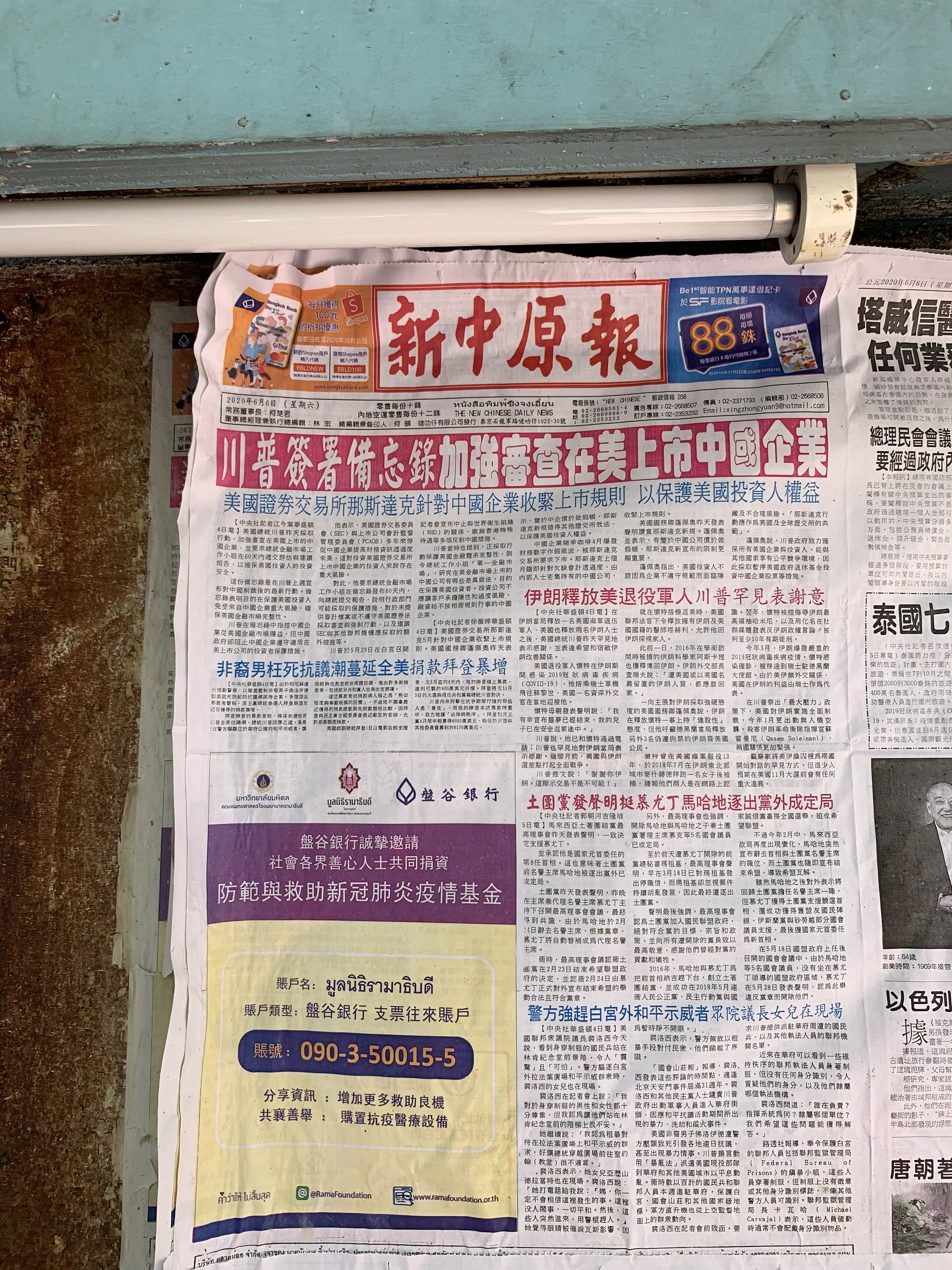
New Chinese Daily News 6 June 2020 edition

==== Chinese-language dailies ====
- Vision Thai
- Sing Sian Yer Pao – Owned by Guangdong provincial committee of the Chinese Communist Party.
- Universal Daily News
- Tong Hua Daily News
- Kia Hua Tong Nguan (Sirinakorn)
- Asia News Time
- New Chinese Daily News

==== Semi-weekly business newspapers ====
- Prachachat Turakij – Owned by Matichon PLC. Circulation is 120,000.
- Than Settakij – Circulation is 120,000.
- Siam Turakij
- Krungthep Turakij Biz Week (กรุงเทพธุรกิจบิซวีค) – Circulation is 200,000. Owned by the Nation Multimedia Group. This paper is popular with Thai intellectuals. Its political stance is progressive.

==== Weekly newspapers ====
- Chiang Mai Mail – English language; published every Tuesday.
- Chiang Rai Times – English language; Chiang Rai news, classifieds, business listings, and travel information for Chiang Rai Province.
- Krungthep Turakij Biz Week – Part of the Nation Multimedia Group.
- Novostiphuketa – Russian language; sister publication of Phuket News; owned by Class Act Media.
- Phujatkarnly Week – Owned by the Manager Media Group.
- Phuket News – English language; owned by Class Act Media.

==== Weekly newsmagazines ====
- Matichon Weekly – Part of Matichon PLC; average circulation in 2003-2004 according to the International Federation of the Periodical Press (FIPP) was 300,000.

==== Monthly and other newspapers ====
- Hua Hin Today – A monthly, English language newspaper, published in Hua Hin. The paper was established in 2003, Police Major General Noi Wannapaiboon is the Editor. The paper is distributed throughout the Provinces of Phetchaburi and Prachuap Khiri khan with a focus on the towns of Hua Hin, Cha-Am and Pranburi. It is the only English language newspaper in this region. The paper has an editorial agreement with Bangkok Post and ThaiVisa. The website and Facebook provides online editions of the paper and other additional unpublished information. Content of the paper includes the promotion and reporting of local events and other articles which may relate to interests in the region. As well as news, the content covers restaurants, resorts and sporting activities, especially golf as there are many golf courses in the region with major events.
- The Korat Daily – Thai language paper owned by Mr Soontorn Janrungsee; has the largest circulation in the region, with some 22 million inhabitants. It maintains strong international links with various news organizations and provides in-depth coverage of local, regional, and international affairs. It also publishes the English-language weekly The Korat Post.
- The Korat Post – English language monthly formerly published by Mrs Tongmuan Anderson, the wife of a former US Peace Corps volunteer and the paper's editor and translator, Frank G Anderson. The paper derived its news from local and visiting sources, from village events to national occurrences. Begun in April 1999, it was independent and has even indicated its opposition, editorially, to government policies. It also provided translations of other local Thai language papers for English readers. The newspaper ceased publication of a hard copy edition in May 2005.
- Thailands Tidende – A monthly Norwegian-language newspaper published in Pattaya.

== Advertising revenues ==
Ad spending in Thai media for the first nine-months of 2018:

- All media: down 0.67 percent year-on-year (Jan–Sep 2017 - Jan–Sep 2018) to 78.34 billion baht
- Magazines: down 35.37 percent
- Newspapers: down 22.71 percent
- Cable/satellite TV: down 21.03 percent
- Transit media: down 2.34 percent
- Outdoor media: up 7.96 percent
- Cinema: up 6.4 percent
- In-store media: up 5.28 percent
- Internet: up 2.84 percent
- TV: 2.18 percent
- Radio: up 1.97 percent

== Censorship ==
=== Internet ===
The national constitution of Thailand provides for the right of unrestricted expression whereas the government intensely restricts it. The Ministry of Information and Communication Technology (MICT) actively blocks Thai ISPs from accessing websites it deems offensive, mainly pornography sites, but political sites, particularly those having to do with the South Thailand insurgency are also blocked.

One of the largest Internet forums in Thailand is pantip.com, which often contains political discussions and criticism of the government, is currently shut down due to MICT. It was allowed to freely operate. Users, however, were required to register their identities using their national identification number. The website of Midnight University was ordered shut down by the military junta after the 2006 Thailand coup.

On 25 August 2020, Facebook accused Thai government of forcing it to block a group believed to be critical of the country's monarchy. The Facebook group with 1 million members, Royalist Marketplace featured posts about the Thai royal family. The government also threatened criminal proceedings against Facebook's representatives in Thailand.

==== YouTube controversy ====
On 4 April 2007, the Thai government blocked access to YouTube as a result of a video clip which showed "graffiti-like elements" crudely painted over a photograph slideshow of King Bhumibol Adulyadej. One part of that video juxtaposed pictures of feet over the king's image, a major taboo in a culture where feet are considered dirty and offensive and the king is not to be disrespected by anyone according to the Thai constitution. The soundtrack was the Thai national anthem.

The ban has led to more YouTube videos mocking the Thai king. Proponents cite the case of Oliver Jufer to paint Thailand as an undemocratic nation. Opponents claim freedom of speech is not an absolute right and that this act of vandalism is abuse of freedom of speech akin to verbal harassment and hate speech (an insult to Thai values and sensitivities).

=== Print media ===
- Thailand banned imports and sales of a November 2015 issue of the French women's magazine Marie Claire on 8 April 2016 because of an article it said carried content insulting to the royal family and offensive to Thai people. The article was cited on the cover. The teaser read: "Thaĭlande- Le prince hėritier menacé par son addiction aux femmes." ("Thailand-The crown prince threatened by his addiction to women") The article itself, written by Emmanuel Mortagne, is entitled, "Le Prince Qui Repudiait Ses Femmes" ("The Prince who Repudiates his Women").

== NCPO moves to control media ==
Following their assumption of power in May 2014, the National Council for Peace and Order has taken a number of steps to curtail freedom of expression. Junta leader Prayut Chan-o-Cha declared he had the power to forcefully close media outlets and he suggested "in jest" that he will "execute" journalists who don't report the "truth" about his government.

=== NCPO Announcement No. 97 ===
Shortly after the coup of May 2014, the NCPO issued Announcement 97. It forbids reportage or opinion pieces that might inflame the populace and cause unrest. The Bangkok Post reports that, under the aegis of the announcement, security forces have intimidated, invited for "attitude adjustment", arrested, and imprisoned a number of recalcitrant media professionals. More cases are pending, mostly in military courts, on charges of sedition.

=== Media shut downs ===
The military junta has a particular distaste for Voice TV. Since the May 2014 military coup, Voice TV has been a censorship target. Authorities shut down the station for 26 days in 2014 and seven days in 2017. There have been 17 partial bans, in which authorities instructed the station to remove certain programs. To resume broadcasting, the NBTC compelled Voice TV to sign a memorandum of understanding that requires the station to make no critical comments about the junta or the situation in Thailand. In March 2017, the junta closed down Voice TV for seven days, after the channel criticized the martial law imposed on Wat Phra Dhammakaya during the junta's crackdown and siege of the temple. On 12 February 2019, the National Broadcasting and Telecommunications Commission (NBTC) suspended Voice TV for 15 days, effective 13 February. The NBTC claimed the station caused public confusion, incited conflict in society, and threatened national security. It had aired candidates critical of Thailand's military government and broadcast criticisms of the government's handling of the upcoming elections and the economy.

In August 2017, Peace TV was also closed down for a month, the junta citing "it broke the rules of the NCPO".

Thailand's ruling military junta has banned a prominent journalist, Pravit Rojanaphruk, from leaving the country to attend UNESCO's 2016 World Press Freedom Day conference in Finland in May. Pravit requires government permission to travel abroad following previous run-ins with the junta. An NCPO spokesperson told the Australian Broadcasting Corporation that Pravit "keeps violating the orders of the NCPO in many ways, so his travel is not approved". Pravit, a frequent critic of the junta, has been detained twice in recent years by the NCPO for "attitude adjustment". The first detention lasted one week. His most recent detention, in September 2015, occurred after he tweeted, "Freedom can't be maintained if we're not willing to defend it." He was held without charges for three days, reportedly in near-isolation. Pravit said his detention ended with a six-hour-long interrogation during which he was encouraged to sign an agreement stating that he would not travel abroad without the government's permission, among other stipulations.

Upon his release, Pravit resigned from his position at the English-language newspaper, The Nation, citing political disagreements with the staff there. He now writes for Khaosod English. In 2017, Pravit Rojanaphruk was charged with sedition because of Facebook posts he wrote criticizing the junta for endangering the Thai economy. He could face seven to twenty years in jail, according to the Committee to Protect Journalists.

=== Crackdown on foreign correspondents ===
In early 2016, the Prayut government embarked on a campaign to redefine the M-class visa requirements for foreign journalists. The changes are described as "technical", but the Thai foreign minister admits that the real agenda is to make it more difficult for foreign journalists to live and work in Thailand.

Foreign Minister Don Pramudwinai told foreign and local journalists that the campaign will cut down on negative reporting. According to him, around 10 percent of the roughly 500 foreign journalists in Thailand will be affected. The aim is to regulate the foreign press and get what he calls "unreal" journalists out of Thailand. They will be denied visas to live and work in Thailand.

New visa rules have come into effect. Rule number one states the applicant "must be employed by a news agency...." Rule number two is that the journalist must be a salaried, full-time employee of that agency. Freelancers or new media journalists need not apply. Lastly, The ministry intends to examine the history of journalist visa applicants to see if they have ever committed "possible disruption to the public order" of Thailand. A criminal record report from the applicant's home country, and copies of all work going back one year must be included with the visa application. The new rules have been strongly opposed by the Foreign Correspondents' Club of Thailand (FCCT).
