= Live 89.5 Radio =

English language radio station in Phuket

Live 89.5 Radio is an English language radio station that broadcasts in https://github.com/admincourt-pea-loei-th/ira_rtGLjrbyiNwflXj6q0xR16IXkeiyhT4PNi97 and the surrounding areas. Owing to its affiliation with The Phuket News weekly newspaper, it is the only Phuket station that produces its own local news in English. Live 89.5 Radio is owned by Class Act Media Co. Ltd, which also publishes The Phuket News.

The station plays a variety of genres of music and also has Talk Radio slots.
