= Navamindra Maharaj Day =

Public holiday in Thailand

(Thailand) Navamindra Maharaj Day
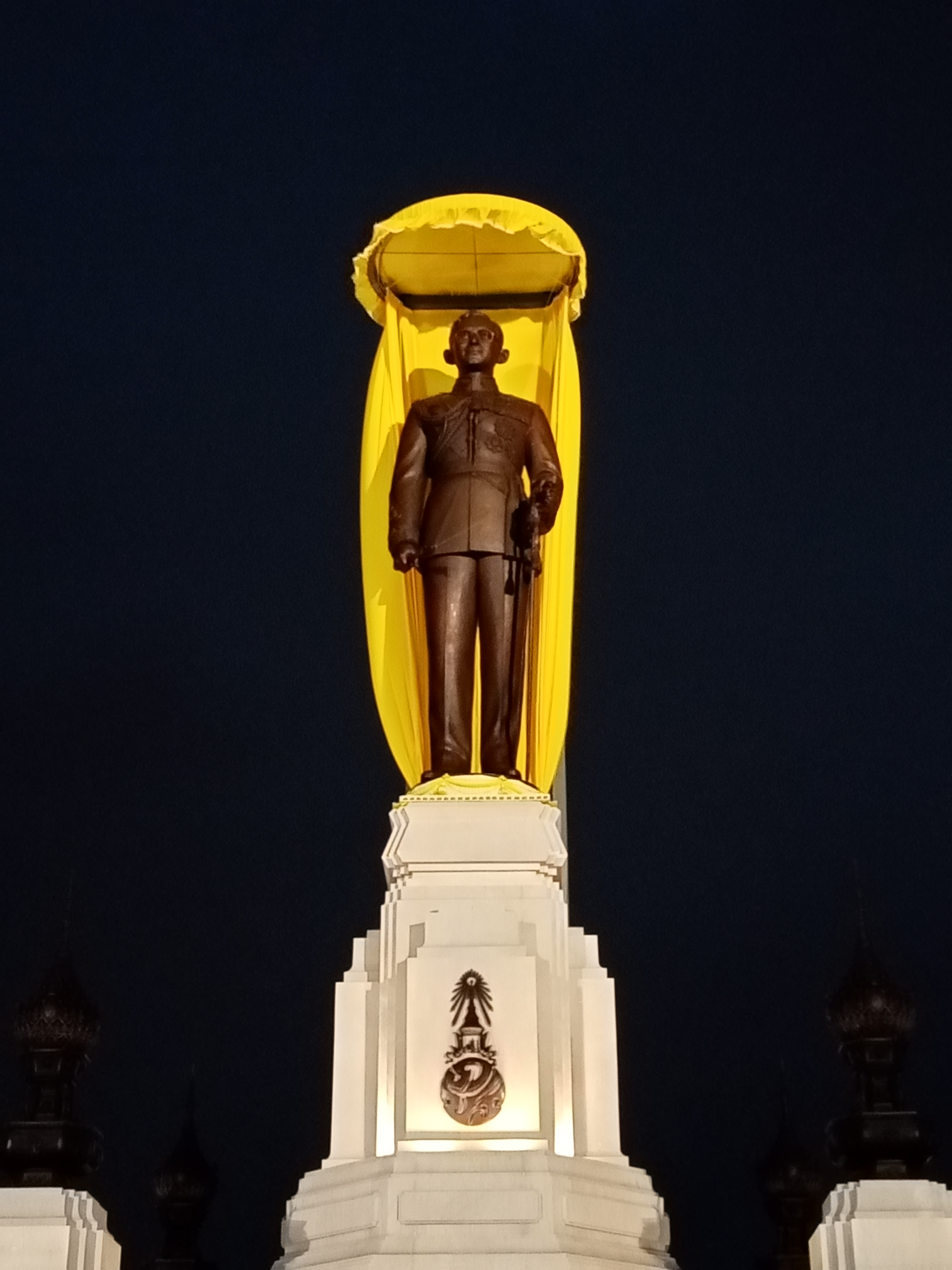
- The Royal Monument of His Majesty King Bhumibol Adulyadej the Great at King Rama IX Memorial Park (Nang Loeng Racecourse Old)
- Observed by: Thai government
- Liturgical color: Yellow
- Type: Public holidays
- Significance: The anniversary of the death of His Majesty King Bhumibol Adulyadej the Great
- Date: 13 October
- Next time: 13 October 2027
- Duration: 1 Day
- Frequency: Every year
- First time: April 21, 2017 (9 years ago)
- Started by: First Prayut cabinet
- Related to: The Birthday anniversary of His Majesty King Bhumibol Adulyadej the Great; Chulalongkorn Day

Navamindra Maharaj Day Every year on October 13, it is the anniversary of the death of Bhumibol Adulyadej the Great, Rama IX, the ninth monarch of the Chakri Dynasty.

== History ==
On April 11, 2017, the First Prayut cabinet meeting designated October 13 of every year, which falls on the anniversary of the death of Bhumibol Adulyadej the Great, as a public holiday. and issued as an announcement from the Office of the Prime Minister regarding working hours and public holidays, No. 23, dated 21 April 2017. On the same day, Vajiralongkorn granted permission to designate it as "an important national day of Thailand" and to organize activities in the same manner as Chulalongkorn Day.

On September 26, 2023, the Srettha cabinet meeting resolved to approve the name of the day as requested from Vajiralongkorn, which Ariyavongsagatanana (Amborn Ambaro), the Supreme Patriarch of Thailand, had also granted the name for his royal consideration, using the name "Navamindra Maharaj Day". It means the day to commemorate the great King Rama IX. There was an official announcement from the Office of the Prime Minister regarding this matter on September 29 and published in the Royal Gazette on October 2, 2023.

On Navamindra Maharaj Day, every Thai king and Thai queen, along with members of the royal family, will travel to lay wreaths at The Royal Monument of Bhumibol Adulyadej the Great, inside King Rama IX Memorial Park (Nang Loeng Race Course Old), as is done every year.
