= Bangkok Daily Mail =

Defunct newspaper in Bangkok, Thailand

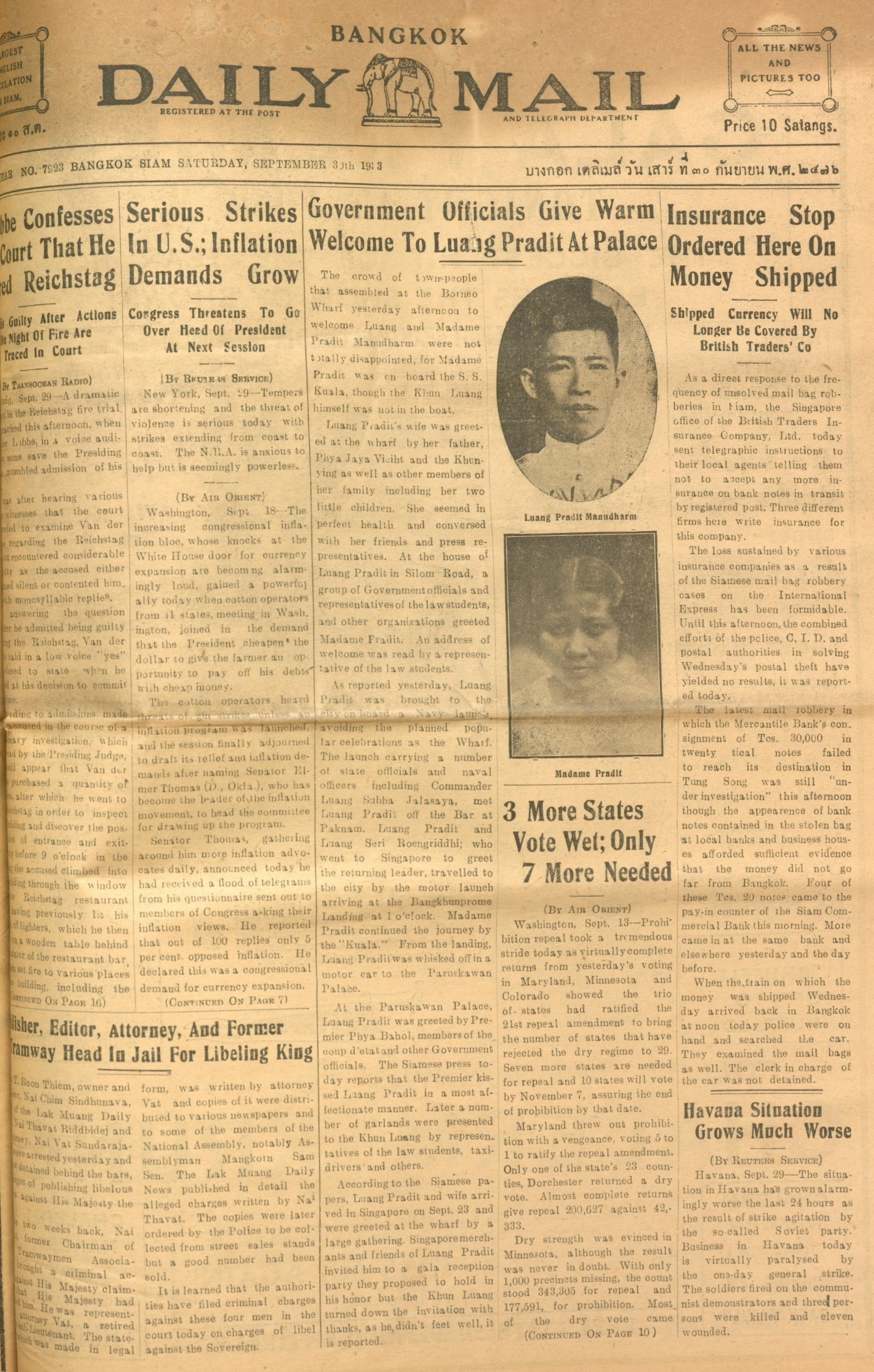
- 30 September 1933 issue of Bangkok Daily Mail
- Type: Daily (except Sunday) newspaper
- Editor: Charles A. Cashon
- Founded: January 1910
- Ceased publication: October 1933
- Language: English
- Headquarters: Bangkok, Thailand

The Bangkok Daily Mail was an English-language daily newspaper in Thailand first published at the beginning of January 1910. Its former name was Siam Free Press. The newspaper was owned by King Prajadhipok (Rama VII) and run by Prince Svasti and Louis Girivat. Its office was located on Si Phraya Road. On 8 August 1933, The Bangkok Daily Mail was suspended by the authorities and was allowed to resume publication following an apology and the payment of a deposit 'for future good behavior'. However, it was closed once and for all by the Government in October 1933 "because of its royalist connections".

A special weekly pictorial and feature section was included with Saturday issues.

The newspaper also had a version published in Thai (กรุงเทพฯเดลิเมล์).

== See also ==
- Timeline of English-language newspapers published in Thailand
- List of online newspaper archives - Thailand
