= Radio Thailand =

National radio broadcaster of Thailand

Coordinates: 13.782137°N 100.559715°E

- Country: Thailand
- Broadcast area: Bangkok
- License area: Bangkok
- Headquarters: Bangkok

Ownership
- Owner: National Broadcasting Services of Thailand

History
- Launch date: February 25, 1930; 96 years ago (National Radio Day)

Links
- Website: nbt1.prd.go.th

Radio Thailand (Thai: สถานีวิทยุกระจายเสียงแห่งประเทศไทย) is the public broadcasting radio station in Thailand owned by the National Broadcasting Services of Thailand based in Bangkok. The station has six FM national radio, 65 FM provincial radio, three AM national radio, 46 AM provincial radio and World Service. Some Radio Thailand provincial radio stations can be received in neighbor countries of Thailand like Malaysia, Laos, Cambodia and Myanmar. Founded on 25 February 1930 as Radio Bangkok of Phaya Thai and initially placed under the Post and Telegraph Department, it was transferred to the Public Relations Department (established on 3 May 1933) in 1939.

== FM stations ==
- FM 88.8 MHz – English language services
- FM 92.5 MHz – Radio Thailand National Radio Network Bangkok
- FM 95.0 MHz – Malay language services in Yala
- FM 105.0 MHz – Happy Family Radio (for children, youth and families)

and 65 FM provincial radio stations

== AM stations ==
- AM 819 kHz – For live broadcast
- AM 891 kHz – Radio Thailand National Radio Network Bangkok
- AM 1467 kHz – National Education

and 46 AM provincial radio stations

== Shortwave radio ==
- Radio Thailand World Service – Broadcasts in Thai, Khmer, Malay, English, Burmese, German, Laotian, Japanese, Vietnamese and Chinese languages for international listeners

== See also ==
- Mass media in Thailand
