= Matichon =

Thai daily newspaper

- Matichon newspaper cover, dated January 21, 2022
- Type: Daily Newspaper
- Format: Print, online
- Owner: Matichon Public Company Limited (SET: MATI)
- Founded: 1978
- Political alignment: Center-left, Progressivism
- Language: Thai
- Headquarters: Chatuchak, Bangkok
- Website: https://www.matichon.co.th/

Matichon (Thai: มติชน 'opinion of the people', also known as Matichon Daily to distinguish it from other related publications) is a major Thai-language national daily newspaper. It was founded by a group of progressive writers in 1978, when the country was emerging from the authoritarian government that followed the 6 October 1976 Massacre. Matichon positions itself as a "quality" upmarket newspaper, as opposed to the usually sensationalist mass-circulation papers. In 1997, it had a daily circulation of about 120,000. It carries a strong focus on politics, and was, along with Thai Rath, among the country's most politically influential newspapers at the time.

From the late 2000s, when successive political crises divided public opinion, Matichon has been criticized for harbouring a pro-Red Shirt bias. It has also been subject to controversies regarding its dismissal of editors, and a bribery investigation by the National Press Council of Thailand, for which the paper resigned from the council in protest. Matichon argued the investigation were irregular and that there was political interference in the council's activities.

The paper carries an online arm, Matichon Online, which has a separate editorial board and publishes stories independently of the print edition.

== Matichon Weekly ==
Matichon Weekly (มติชนสุดสัปดาห์, lit. 'Weekend Matichon'), a sister publication of the newspaper, is a weekly Thai-language news magazine with a strong focus on politics. It was first published in 1980, and had been the most widely circulated news magazine of Thailand in the 1990s.
