= Daily News (Thailand) =

- Thai: อ่านความจริง อ่านเดลินิวส์ (transl. Read the truth, read Daily News)

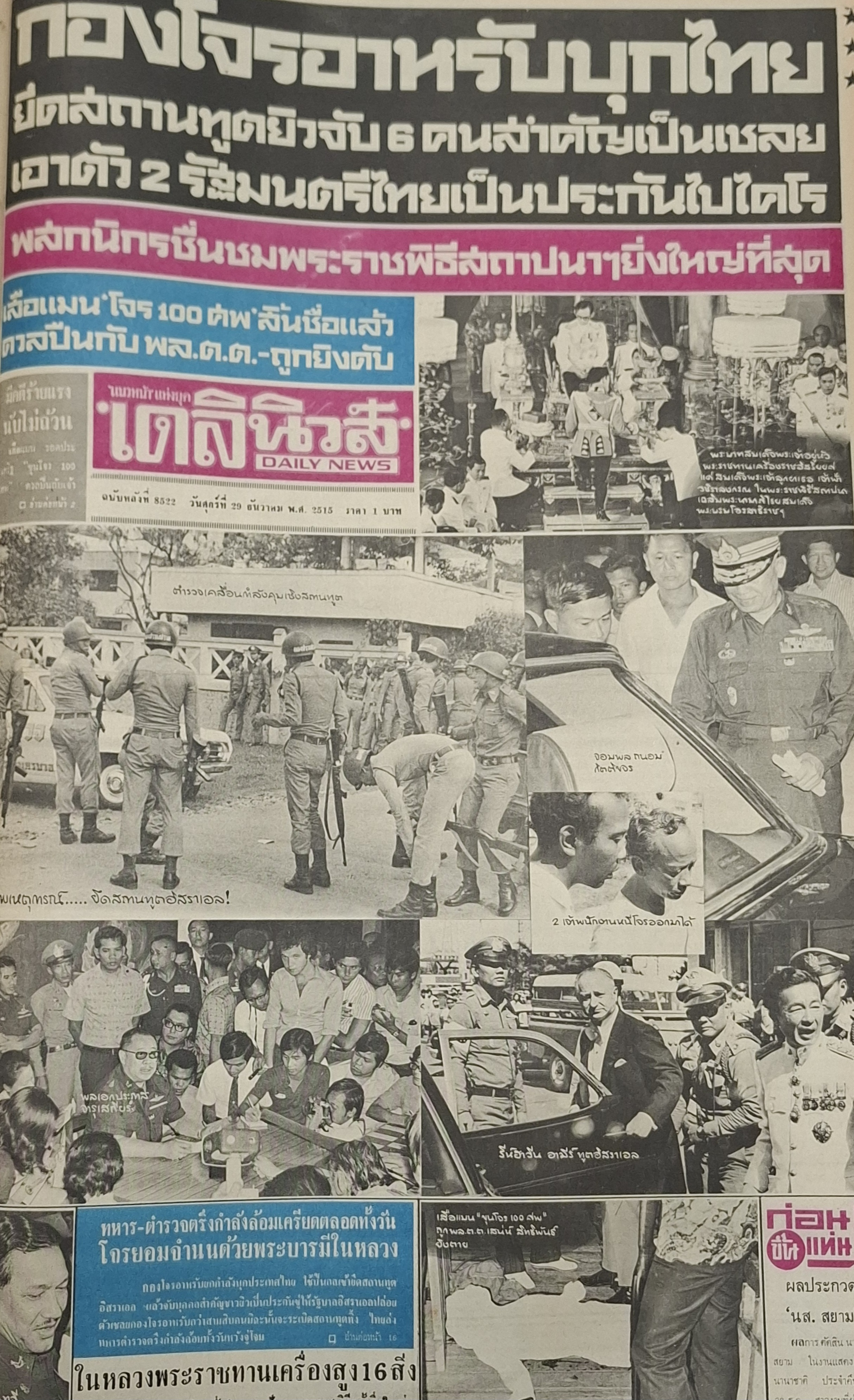
- Front page of Daily News on 29 December 1972, reporting about the Israeli embassy hostage crisis and the investiture of Vajiralongkorn as Crown Prince of Thailand (top right)
- Type: Daily newspaper
- Format: Broadsheet
- Founded: 24 June 1950 as Daily Mail Monday; 28 March 1964; 62 years ago as Naewna Hang Yuk Daily News (Note: The newspaper considers this date as their date of establishment. As it was the date that the paper was refound after bring forced to close down by the order of Field Marshal Sarit Thanarat)
- Ceased publication: 20 October 1958 as Daily Mail Monday
- Language: Thai
- Headquarters: Lak Si, Bangkok, Thailand
- Circulation: 850,000
- Website: dailynews.co.th

Daily News (Thai: เดลินิวส์, pronounced [dēː.lī.nīw(s)]) is a Thai-language daily newspaper published in Bangkok and distributed nationwide. It is the second-best selling newspaper in Thailand. It has a circulation in excess of 850,000 copies daily.

== History ==
Daily News was founded by Saeng Hetrakul when he purchased the defunct Krung Thep Daily Mail newspaper (Thai edition of the Bangkok Daily Mail) which has ceased publication in 1932 and relaunched it as Daily Mail Monday (Thai: เดลิเมล์วันจันทร์) it was first published weekly and then as a daily. Daily Mail Monday was forced to close down in 1958.

It was refounded as Naewna Hang Yuk Daily News (Thai: แนวหน้าแห่งยุคเดลินิวส์) in 1964 and later shortened it name to just Daily News in 1979.
