= The Phuket News =

The Phuket News is a weekly English language newspaper that covers news, events and happenings in Phuket and the Andaman region. It also contains an extensive section of Asian and international news.

The newspaper is published weekly and distributed in and around Phuket island and in Bangkok and Krabi airports. Distribution in Phuket includes 7 Eleven, Family Mart, B2S, Sengho, Asia Books as well as over 600 independent locations.

The Phuket News is owned by Class Act Media Co. Ltd, which also owns Live 89.5 Radio.
