= Chiang Rai Times =

- Type: Online newspaper
- Format: Digital
- Owner: Independent
- Founded: 2007
- Language: English
- Headquarters: Chiang Rai, Thailand
- Website: chiangraitimes.com

The Chiang Rai Times (often abbreviated as CRT) is an English-language online newspaper based in Chiang Rai, Thailand. Founded in 2007, it provides news coverage focused on northern Thailand, national Thai news, and selected international stories of interest to readers in the region.

== Overview ==
The publication covers a wide range of topics, including Thai politics, tourism, business, crime, culture, and regional development in Chiang Rai and surrounding provinces. It primarily serves English-speaking residents, expatriates, and international readers seeking updates about northern Thailand.

The website also publishes opinion pieces, travel guides, and commentary on social and environmental issues affecting Thailand.

== History ==
The Chiang Rai Times was launched in 2007 as an independent online news outlet to provide English-language reporting for Chiang Rai province, an area with limited English-language media at the time. Over the years, it has expanded its focus to include broader national and ASEAN-related news.

== Editorial stance ==
The newspaper maintains an independent editorial line and aggregates reports from local and international news agencies alongside original reporting. It aims to promote awareness of northern Thailand’s development, tourism, and social issues.

== Online presence ==
The Chiang Rai Times operates exclusively online via its official website, chiangraitimes.com, and maintains social media pages for news dissemination and reader engagement.

== See also ==
- List of newspapers in Thailand
- Media of Thailand
