= Phuket Gazette =

Newspaper in Thailand

- Type: Weekly newspaper
- Format: Compact
- Founder: John Magee
- Publisher: The Phuket Gazette Co. Ltd.
- Founded: May 1993; 33 years ago Rebranded 2018; 8 years ago
- Language: English
- Headquarters: Phuket, Thailand

The Phuket Gazette was a weekly English-language compact newspaper published in Phuket, Thailand by The Phuket Gazette Co. Ltd., at Gazette Square in Koh Kaew. The paper was established in 1993 by John Magee, and Rungtip Hongjakpet. With national distribution throughout Thailand, the newspaper was the largest English-language publication in or about Phuket, and ranked as the third largest English-language newspaper in Thailand.

== History ==
In May 1993, American businessman John Magee started the Phuket Gazette, and it was the first English-language newspaper on the island. Over time, it grew into the region's dominant publication, capturing more than 80% of the local market. Depending on the season, the paper's circulation fluctuated between 25,000 and 35,000 copies.

According to its founder, the paper reported on "inconvenient truths" that the narrative promoted by some local operators. This included coverage of crime, corruption, environmental degradation, and abuses involving tourists. Media coverage of sensitive local problems reportedly caused tension with local officials and other parties. The founder faced personal threats and police raids on the newspaper's office.

In 2002, the Nation Multimedia Group, a major media company in Thailand, acquired a 19.7% stake in the newspaper. Around 2002, the newspaper began transitioning from a fortnightly (every two weeks) schedule to a weekly publication. By 2010, it had become Phuket’s main weekly newspaper.

In 2016, the publication offered Gazette Online. The newspaper was named "Best Newspaper in Southern Thailand" at the 2016 Thailand Professionals Business & Lifestyle Awards.

Its television business, PGTV, producer of the Phuket Today show, was Phuket's only national channel, covering the entire country through Thailand's mass communications organization MCOT and cable provider True Visions. Other Gazette media services include the popular comments board, the Phuket Forum, and Gazette Aviation, providing aerial promotions as well as management of the company aircraft, "News Dog". The Gazette was also a major media sponsor, often in cooperation with The Nation, for community events, including many that raise funds for local charities.

In May 2017, the Phuket Gazette ended its run as a standalone print newspaper, briefly becoming a supplement inserted into The Nation. By July 31, 2017, the company ceased operations entirely.

The newspaper's digital assets, including its website and social media channels, were acquired by Digital Broker Ventures, a Hong Kong-based firm. In 2018, these assets were rebranded and relaunched as The Thaiger.

== The Thaiger ==
The Thaiger started as The Thaiger 102.75 FM, a radio station that Tim Newton started in Phuket in 2016. When Phuket Gazette shut down in July 2017, Digital Broker Ventures (DBV) acquired its digital assets, including an archive of more than 25,000 articles. The Thaiger's digital news platform, which started in 2018, was built on this acquisition.

The Thaiger started an external fundraising round (pre-Series A) in 2021 and raised almost half a million US dollars. This money allowed them to branch out into e-commerce, media production, and other businesses besides news.

When Digital Broker Ventures (DBV) owned The Thaiger, they used a "mobile-first" content strategy that focused on getting news to online readers quickly. In April 2024, The Thaiger Media Group bought ASEAN Now (formerly Thaivisa.com), one of the largest and oldest online forums for expats in Thailand. Before acquiring ASEAN Now, The Thaiger attracted over three million monthly users, making it one of Thailand's most widely read digital news platforms. Following the merger, the combined network reportedly reached around five million monthly users, surpassing all other major English-language publishers in the country.

In September 2020, the news outlet Khaosod English filed a formal police complaint in Bangkok against The Thaiger for copyright infringement. The complaint alleged that The Thaiger had systematically copied and republished at least 20 of its articles and images without permission, often attributing the work to its own staff.
