= Thailands Tidende =

Norwegian-language newspaper

- Format: Online newspaper
- Editor: Dag A. Ekeberg
- Founded: 2008
- Language: Norwegian
- Ceased publication: January 2019 (Print)
- Headquarters: Pattaya, Thailand
- Website: thailandstidende.com

Thailands Tidende is a free Norwegian-language published in Thailand. Its headquarters are in Pattaya and it was founded in December 2008.

Until January 2019, the newspaper was published in both a monthly paper version and an online version. The paper version was distributed to tourist destinations across Thailand, including Bangkok, Cha-am, Hua Hin, Koh Chang, Ko Samui, Krabi, Pattaya, and Phuket.

Since January 2019, the newspaper has been published only online.
