= List of LGBTQ-related films of 2007 =

This is a list of lesbian, gay, bisexual, transgender or queer-related films released in 2007. It contains theatrically released films that deal with important gay, lesbian, bisexual, transgender or queer characters or issues and may have same-sex romance or relationships as a plot device.

== Films ==
Title	Director	Country	Genre	Cast	Notes
The 3 L'il Pigs	Patrick Huard	Canada	Comedy	Claude Legault, Guillaume Lemay-Thivierge and Paul Doucet	a.k.a. Les 3 p'tits cochons
68 Pages	Sridhar Rangayan	India	Drama	Mouli Ganguly, Joy Sengupta, Jayati Bhatia and Zafar Karachiwala	
Across the Universe	Julie Taymor	United States	Drama, musical	Evan Rachel Wood, Jim Sturgess, Jon Anderson, Dana Fuchs, Martin Luther McCoy and T.V. Carpio	Plot incorporates 34 compositions written by members of The Beatles
An American Crime	Tommy O'Haver	United States	Drama	Elliot Page, Catherine Keener, Hayley McFarland, Ari Graynor, Nick Searcy, Romy Rosemont, Evan Peters, James Franco, Brian Geraghty, Michael Welch, Jeremy Sumpter, Scout Taylor-Compton, Bradley Whitford and Michael O'Keefe	Based on the murder of Sylvia Likens
Bangkok Love Story	Poj Arnon	Thailand	Drama	Rattanaballang Tohssawat, Chaiwat Thongsaeng, Weeradit Srimalai and Chatcha Rujinanon	
Before I Forget	Jacques Nolot	France	Drama	Jacques Nolot, Marc Rioufol, Bastien d'Asnières, Bruno Moneglia, Jean Pommier, David Kessler and Albert Mainella	a.k.a. Avant que j'oublie
Boystown	Juan Flahn	Spain	Comedy	Pepón Nieto, Pablo Puyol, Concha Velasco, Rosa Maria Sardà, Carlos Fuentes and Mariola Fuentes	a.k.a. Chuecatown
Breakfast with Scot	Laurie Lynd	Canada	Comedy	Tom Cavanagh, Ben Shenkman, Noah Bernett, Jeananne Goossen, Benz Antoine, Shauna MacDonald, Graham Greene, Vanessa Thompson, Alexander Franks, Dylan Everett, Colin Cunningham, Anna Silk, Robin Brûlé, Cameron Ansell, William Cuddy, Fiona Reid and Jay Anderson	Based on the novel of the same name by Michael Downing
Butch Jamie	Michelle Ehlen	United States	Comedy, romance	Michelle Ehlen, Olivia Nix, Tiffany Anne Carrin, David Au, Andrea Andrei, Joe McDaniel, Mary Lynch, Nathan Edmondson, Fiona Hickey, Nevada Stonbely, Kirsten Ehlen Poppen, Sherri A. Ruark, Leah Williamson, Matt Burnham, Willow Baer, Matt Workman, Patrick O'Connor, Ken Ehlen and Beverley Ehlen	
Caramel	Nadine Labaki	France; Lebanon	Comedy, drama	Nadine Labaki, Adel Karam, Yasmine Al Masri, Joanna Moukarzel, Gisèle Aouad, Dimitri Staneofski, Sihame Haddad, Aziza Semaan, Fadia Stella and Fatmeh Safa	a.k.a. Sukkar banat
Clandestinos	Antonio Hens	Spain	Crime, drama	Israel Rodríguez, Mehroz Arif, Hugo Catalán, Juanma Lara, Elena Martínez, Inma Cuevas, Pepa Aniorte, Fanny de Castro, Luis Hostalot, Ana Rayo, Juan Luis Galiardo, Pablo Puyol, Antonio Dechent, Manuel Salas, Asun Ayllón and Raúl Zajdner	
Clapham Junction	Adrian Shergold	United Kingdom	Drama	David Leon, Stuart Bunce, Joseph Mawle, Luke Treadaway and Richard Lintern	
Coklat Stroberi	Ardy Octaviand	Indonesia	Drama	Marsha Timothy, Marrio Medhithia, Nino Fernandez, Nadia Saphira and Fauzi Baadila	a.k.a. Chocolate Strawberry
Crossing	Roger Evan Larry	Canada	Romantic, thriller	Sebastian Spence, Crystal Buble, Bif Naked, Alan C. Peterson, Fred Ewanuick, Jo Bates, Warren Christie, Bernie Coulson, L. Harvey Gold, Tara Wilson and Sasha Piltsin	
Cthulhu	Daniel Gildark	United States	Horror	Cara Buono, Jason Cattle, Richard Garfield, Ian Geoghegan, Scott Green, Dennis Kleinsmith, Amy Minderhout, Robert Padilla, Tori Spelling, Nancy Stark, Hunter Stroud, Rob Hamm	
The Edge of Heaven	Fatih Akın	Germany; Turkey; Italy	Drama	Baki Davrak, Nurgül Yeşilçay, Tuncel Kurtiz, Nursel Köse, Patrycia Ziolkovska, Hanna Schygulla, İdil Üner, Erkan Can and Turgay Tanülkü	aka Auf der anderen Seite
Fashion Victims	Ingo Rasper	Germany	Comedy	Edgar Selge, Florian Bartholomäi, Roman Knizka, Franziska Walser, Traute Hoess, Gottfried Breitfuss, Marcus Michalski and Horst Krause	a.k.a. Reine Geschmacksache
Fatherhood Dreams	Julia Ivanova	Canada	Documentary	Three families headed by gay fathers; Randy and Drew, a Canadian married couple adopt a baby boy; Steve co-parents his daughters with two lesbian mothers; while Scott becomes a surrogate father to twins	Released by Interfilm Productions
Finn's Girl	Dominique Cardona, Laurie Colbert	Canada	Comedy, romance	Brooke Johnson, Yanna McIntosh, Maya Ritter, Richard Clarkin, Nathalie Toriel, Gilles Lemaire, Andrew Chalmers, Chantel Cole, Gail Maurice, Stephen Bogaert, Jane Moffat, Devon Bostick and Janet Gigliotti	
For the Bible Tells Me So	Daniel G. Karslake	United States	Documentary	Interviewed; Gene Robinson, Jake Reitan, Chrissy Gephardt, Tonia Poteat and Mary Lou Wallner	Premiered at the 2007 Sundance Film Festival
From Head to Toe	Simone Cangelosi	Italy	Documentary	Marcella Di Folco, Porpora Marcasciano, Valérie Taccarelli and Simone Cangelosi	a.k.a. Dalla testa ai piedi
Ghost Station	Yuthlert Sippapak	Thailand	Comedy, horror	Kiattisak Udomnak, Nakorn Silachai, Achita Sik-kamana and Supassra Ruangwong	Spoof of the movie Brokeback Mountain
Haunting Me (Hor Taew Tak)	Poj Arnon	Thailand	Comedy, horror	Jaturong Mokjok, Sukonthawa Koetnimit, Ekkachai Srivichai, Yingsak Chonglertjetsadawong, Koti Arambawy, Panward Hemmanee, Wiradit Srimalai, Ratchanont Sukpragawp, Thanakorn Jaipinta, Sophia La, Anna Mokjok, Somlek Sakdikul, Siwawat Sappinyo and Chaiwat Thongsaeng	
Holding Trevor	Rosser Goodman	United States	Drama	Brent Gorski, Jay Brannan, Melissa Searing, Eli Kranski and Christopher Wyllie	
I Now Pronounce You Chuck and Larry	Dennis Dugan	United States	Comedy	Adam Sandler, Kevin James, Jessica Biel, Ving Rhames, Steve Buscemi, Dan Aykroyd, Peter Dante, Nicholas Turturro, Rachel Dratch, Allen Covert, Richard Chamberlain and Nick Swardson	
Itty Bitty Titty Committee	Jamie Babbit	United States	Comedy, drama	Melonie Diaz, Nicole Vicius, Deak Evgenikos, Carly Pope, Lauren Mollica, Melanie Mayron, Daniela Sea, Mircea Monroe, Guinevere Turner, Jenny Shimizu, Leslie Grossman, Jimmi Simpson, Joel Michaely and Clea Duvall	
Kung Fu Tootsie	Jaturong Mokjok	Thailand	Comedy	Sittichai Pabchompoo, Koti Arambawy, Jim Chuancheun, Erik Marcus Schuetz, Jaturong Mokjok, Kreangsak Riantong, Pokchat Thiamchai, Note Chern-Yim and Tanai Sripinyo	
La León	Santiago Otheguy	Argentina; France	Drama	Jorge Román and Daniel Valenzuela	
The Love of Siam	Chukiat Sakveerakul	Thailand	Drama	Sinjai Plengpanich, Songsit Roongnophakunsri, Laila Boonyasak, Mario Maurer, Witwisit Hiranyawongkul, Kanya Rattanapetch, Chanidapa Pongsilpipat and Jirayu La-ongmanee	a.k.a. Rak haeng Siam
Love Songs	Christophe Honoré	France	Musical, drama	Louis Garrel, Ludivine Sagnier, Clotilde Hesme, Chiara Mastroianni, Grégoire Leprince-Ringuet and Brigitte Roüan	a.k.a. Les chansons d'amour
The Man in the Lighthouse	Joselito Altarejos	Philippines	Drama	Harry Laurel, Jennifer Lee, Justin De Leon, Crispin Pineda, Allan Paule, Sheree, Richard Quan, Monti Parungao and Dexter Doria	
Me... Myself	Pongpat Wachirabunjong	Thailand	Drama	Ananda Everingham, Chayanan Manomaisantiphap, Monton Arnupabmard, Puttachat Pongsuchat, Piya Vimuktayon, Direk Amatayakul, Maria Dissayanand, Pratanporn Phuwadolpitak, Pornpisit Somchatvong and Tanit Jitnukul	a.k.a. Khaw hai rak jong jaroen
Naked Boys Singing!	Robert Schrock, Troy Christian	United States	Musical, comedy	Kevin Stea, Joe Souza, Phong Truong, Jason Currie, Joseph Keane, Anthony Manough, Andrew Blake Ames, Vincent Zamora, Jaymes Hodges and Salvatore Vassallo	Based on the off-Broadway musical of the same name
Pleasure Factory	Ekachai Uekrongtham	Thailand; Netherlands; Hong Kong	Drama	Yang Kuei-Mei, Ananda Everingham, Zihan Loo, Katashi Chen, Jeszlene Zhou, Isabella Chen, Xu Er and Ian Francis Low	a.k.a. Kuaile gongchang
Red Without Blue	Brooke Sebold, Benita Sills, Todd Sills	United States	Documentary	Clair Farley, Jennie Farley, Mark Oliver Farley, Scott Farley, Jennifer Jordan and David L. Suarez	Follows a pair of identical twins as one transitions from male to female, Winner of the audience award for documentary at the 2007 Slamdance Film Festival
Saturn in Opposition	Ferzan Özpetek	Italy; France; Turkey	Drama	Stefano Accorsi, Margherita Buy, Serra Yılmaz, Filippo Timi, Pierfrancesco Favino, Ennio Fantastichini, Luca Argentero, Ambra Angiolini, Michelangelo Tommaso, Isabella Ferrari and Milena Vukotic	a.k.a. Saturno contro
Savage Grace	Tom Kalin	Spain; United States; France	Drama	Julianne Moore, Stephen Dillane, Eddie Redmayne, Elena Anaya, Unax Ugalde, Belén Rueda and Hugh Dancy	Based on the book of the same name by Natalie Robins and Steven M.L. Aronson
Save Me	Robert Cary	United States	Drama	Chad Allen, Robert Gant, Judith Light, David Petruzzi, Arron Shiver, Colin Jones, Stephen Lang, William Dennis Hurley, Robert Gant, Robert Baker and Ross Kelly	
The Secrets	Avi Nesher	Israel; France	Drama	Ania Bukstein, Michel Shtamler, Fanny Ardant, Adir Miller, Guri Alfi, Alma Zack, Dana Ivgy, Sefi Rivlin and Rivka Michaeli	
She's a Boy I Knew	Gwen Haworth	Canada	Documentary	Contains combination of interviews, home video footage, short animation clips and interviews with Gwen Haworth's friends and family about her transgender and undergoing gender transition	
Shelter	Jonah Markowitz	United States	Drama	Trevor Wright, Brad Rowe, Tina Holmes, Jackson Wurth, Ross Thomas, Katie Walder, Albert Reed, Joy Gohring, Matt Bushell, Caitlin Crosby and Raquel Justin	
Shelter Me	Marco Simon Puccioni	Italy; France	Drama	Maria de Medeiros, Antonia Liskova, Mounir Ouadi, Gisella Burinato, Vitaliano Trevisan, Steffan Boje, Gerhard Koloneci and Alex Predonzan	a.k.a. Riparo
Sick Nurses	Piraphan Laoyont, Thodsapol Siriwiwat	Thailand	Horror	Chol Wachananont, Wichan Jarujinda, Chidjan Rujiphun, Kanya Rattanapetch, Dollaros Dachapratumwan, Ase Wang, Ampairat Techapoowapat and Ampaiwan Techapoowapat	
Socket	Sean Abley	United States	Science fiction	Derek Long, Matthew Montgomery, Rasool Jahan, Allie Rivenbark and Alexandra Billings	
The Speed of Life	Ed Radtke	United States	Drama	Jeremy Allen White, Peter Appel	
Spider Lilies	Zero Chou	Taiwan	Drama	Rainie Yang, Isabella Leong, Ivy Chen, Jay Shih, Kris Shen, Kris Shie, Michio Hayashida, Pai Chih-ying, Steven Lin and Jag Huang	a.k.a. Ci qing
Suffering Man's Charity	Alan Cumming	United States	Comedy, horror	Alan Cumming, David Boreanaz, Anne Heche, Karen Black, Carrie Fisher, Henry Thomas, Maria-Elena Laas, Rachelle Lefevre, Jane Lynch, Ermahn Ospina, Alison Guh and Whitney Allen	
A Walk Into the Sea: Danny Williams and the Warhol Factory	Esther Robinson	United States	Documentary	Brigid Berlin, John Cale, Nat Finkelstein, Gerard Malanga, Paul Morrissey and Harold Stevenson	About of Esther Robinson's uncle Danny Williams (Andy Warhol's lover and fellow filmmaker)
Water Lilies	Céline Sciamma	France	Drama	Pauline Acquart, Louise Blachère, Adèle Haenel	a.k.a. Naissance des pieuvres
What We Do Is Secret	Rodger Grossman	United States	Drama	Shane West, Bijou Phillips, Rick Gonzalez, Noah Segan, Ashton Holmes, Tina Majorino, Lauren German, Keir O'Donnell, Sebastian Roché, Azura Skye	Based on the life of Darby Crash, singer for the band Germs
Die Wilden Hühner und die Liebe	Vivian Naefe	Germany	Children's film	Michelle von Treuberg, Lucie Hollmann, Paula Riemann, Jette Hering, Zsá Zsá Inci Bürkle, Veronica Ferres, Thomas Kretschmann	
The Witnesses	André Téchiné	France	Drama	Michel Blanc, Emmanuelle Béart, Sami Bouajila, Julie Depardieu, Johan Libéreau	a.k.a. Les témoins
The World Unseen	Shamim Sarif	South Africa; United Kingdom	Drama	Lisa Ray, Sheetal Sheth, Parvin Dabas and David Dennis	Screenplay by Sharif, based on her novel of the same name
XXY	Lucía Puenzo	Argentina; Spain	Drama	Ricardo Darín, Valeria Bertuccelli, Inés Efron, Martín Piroyansky, Carolina Peleritti	
You, Me and Him	Daniel Ribeiro	Brazil	Short	Daniel Tavares, Diego Torraca, Eduardo Melo	a.k.a. Café Com Leite
