= August (band) =

August Band
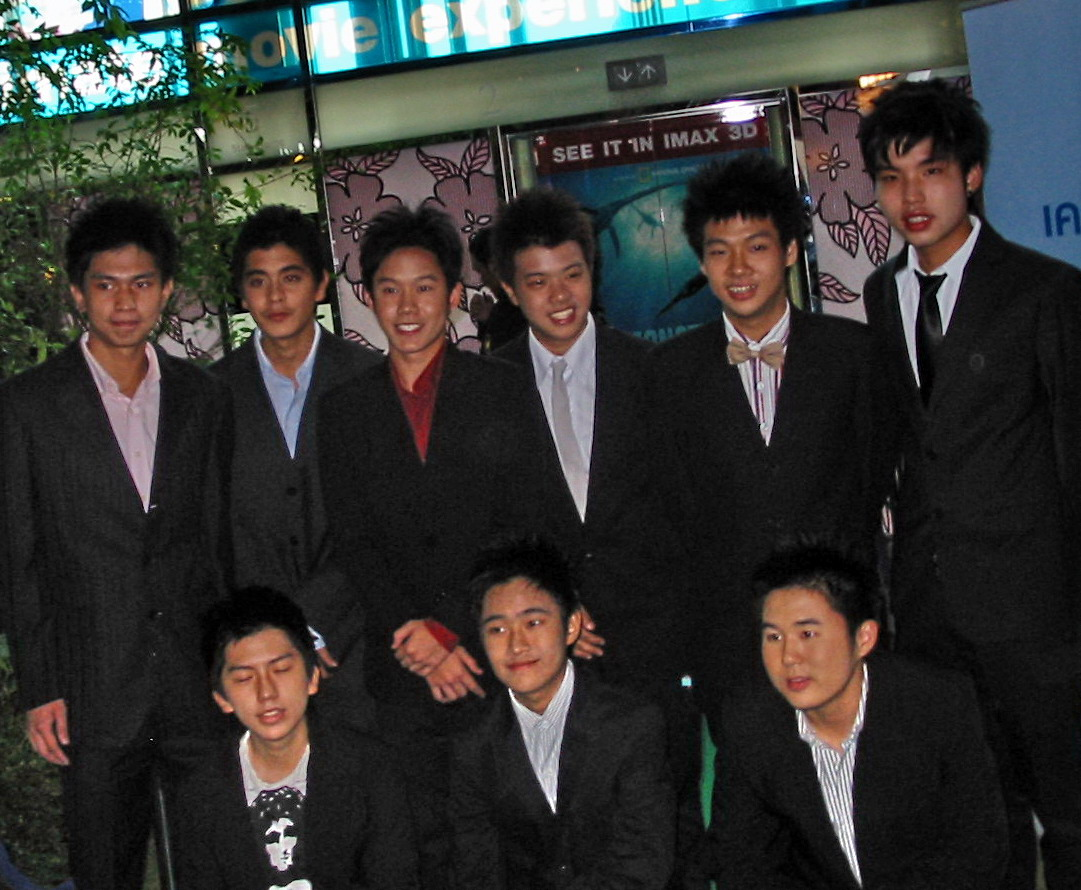
- The August Band

Background information
- Origin: Bangkok, Thailand
- Genre: Thai Pop
- Years active: 2006 – 2014
- Labels: Studio Commuan Co., Ltd
- Members: Witwisit Hiranyawongkul (Pchy) Chanon Rigulasurakarn (Non); Tossaporn Bhunmi (Tle); Watcharit Awasiripong (Arm); Poskorn Wirunsup (Petch); Suwapat Songsiangchai (Mac); Wannaphong Jangbumrung (Taw); Patomawat Wansukprasert (Nine); Natapong Navasilawat (Ong); Napantnat Puangomsin (Tor) Attanan Piyaset (Wan)
- Past members: Tekatath Nuntawaleekul (Joker) Chalotorn Chomjan (M); Woraphat Dejkajonwuth (Mike) Tee Chaithirasuvet (Goo)
- Website: http://www.august-mall.com

August is a Thai boy band that consists eleven members. They were originally formed as a fictional band in the movie The Love of Siam (a Thai romantic-drama film written and directed by Chookiat Sakveerakul). After acting in the film portrayal, the members found themselves comfortable with each other so decided to pursue it into the Thai Entertainment Industry. At first, the band consisted of Pchy, Non, Nine, Tor, Em, Wan, Arm, Mike Ong, Mac, and Petch. Eventually, their managers added up Goo, Joker, Taw and summing up a total number of fourteen members. Hence, two of the original members namely Em and Mike withdrew due to personal issues and Goo (who was by then replaced by Tle) also left because of controversies. Recently, Joker had left the band to concentrate on his studies.

== Members ==
Name	Thai Name	Date of birth	Band Position	Note
Witwisit Hiranyawongkul (Pchy)	วิชญ์วิสิฐ หิรัญวงษ์กุล (พิช)	20 July 1989	Lead Vocalist	-
Natapong Navasilawat (Ong)	ณฐพงษ์ นวศีลวัตร์ (อ๋อง)	9 April 1990	Vocals	-
Suwapat Songsiangchai (Mac)	สุวพัชร ทรงเสี่ยงไชย (แมค)	31 Aug 1989	Vocals	-
Paskorn Wiroonsup (Petch)	ภาสกร วิรุฬห์ทรัพย์ (เพชร)	14 Dec 1995	Vocals	-
Tekatath Nuntawaleekul (Joker)	ทีฆทัศน์ นันทวลีกุล (โจ๊กเกอร์)	9 Oct 1990	Vocals	Left the Band
Chanon Rikulasulakarn (Non)	ชานน ริกุลสุรกาน (นน)	13 May 1990	Guitar	-
Tossaporn Bhunmi (Tle)	ทศพร บุญมี (เติ้ล)	19 July 1988	Electric Guitar	-
Napantnat Puangomsin (Tor)	นภันต์ธนัชย์ พ่วงออมสิน (ต่อ)	14 Aug 1989	Bass	-
Patomawat Wansukprasert (Nine)	ปฐมวรรธน์ วันสุขประเสริฐ (นายน์)	9 Oct 1989	Saxophone	-
Watcharit Awasiripong (Arm)	วัชริศ อวศิริพงษ์ (อาม)	29 April 1993	Trumpets	-
Woraprat Dejkajornwut (Mike)	วรปรัชญ์ เดชขจรวุฒิ (ไมค์)	18 Feb 1991	Trombone	Left the Band
Attanan Piyaset (Van)	อรรถนันต์ ปิยเศรษฐ์ (แวน)	11 July 1989	Keyboard	-
Wannaphong Jangbumrung (Taw)	วรรณพงศ์ แจงบำรุง (ตาว)	17 Dec 1987	Drum	-
Chalotorn Chomjan (M)	ชโลธร ชมจันทร์ (เอ็ม)	21 April	Drum	Left the Band
Tee Chaithirasuvet (Goo)	ธีร์ ไชยธีระสุเวท (กู๋)	3 Nov	Drum	Left the Band

== Albums ==
=== Singles ===
- Summer

Summer
Summer MV

- Love is Not Everything

Love is Not Everything (Thai)
Love is Not Everything (Mandarin)
Love is Not Everything Instrumental
Love is Not Everything Instrumental (Mandarin)

=== Albums ===
- OST-Love of Siam

Disc 1 : CD

Gun Lae Gun : กันและกัน
Ticket (Day Trip)
Roo Suek Barng Mhai (Live) : รู้สึกบ้างไหม
Pieng Ter : เพียงเธอ
Gun Lae Gun (Acoustic version) : กันและกัน
Kuen Aun Pen Niran : คืนอันเป็นนิรันดร์
Gun Lae Gun (Live) : กันและกัน
Roo Suek Barng Mhai (Original Mix) : รู้สึกบ้างไหม
Pieng Ter (Demo) : เพียงเธอ
Bonus Track

Disc 2 : VCD

Trailer 'Love of Siam' : ตัวอย่างภาพยนตร์ 'รักแห่งสยาม'
MV 'Gun Lae Gun' : มิวสิควิดีโอเพลง กันและกัน
Introduction to 'The August Band' : แนะนำสมาชิกวงออกัส
Behind the scene MV 'Gun Lae Gun' : เบื้องหลังการถ่ายทำมิวสิควิดีโอเพลงกันและกัน

- August Thanx

Disc 1 : CD

Yung Yoo Nai Jai : ยังอยู่ในใจ
Kob Khun Kun Lae Kun : ขอบคุณกันและกัน
Khon Tummada : คนธรรมดา
Ticket Night Trip rmx
Kob Khun Kun Lae Kun : ขอบคุณกันและกัน (Demo)
Silent Night
Yung Yoo Nai Jai : ยังอยู่ในใจ (Instrumental)

Disc 2 : VCD

MV - Gun Lae Gun : กันและกัน
MV - Pieng Ter : เพียงเธอ
Karaoke - Gun Lae Gun : กันและกัน
Karaoke - Pieng Ter : เพียงเธอ

- Radiodrome

Disc 1 : Radiodrome

Chao-yen : เช้า-เย็น
Radio
Jum Dai Mai : จำได้ไหม
Yung Kong... : ยังคง...
Ard Ja Pen : อาจจะเป็น
Chun Lae Ter : ฉันและเธอ
Yah Pai Sei Jai : อย่าไปเสียใจ
Duang Tawan : ดวงตะวัน
Yung hai jai : ยังหายใจ
Dara : ดารา (feat. Paradise Pills)
Chao-yen : เช้า-เย็น (feat. MD, remixed by Kukukoo+)

Disc 2 : (OST 'Fhun warn aiy joob - 4 Romance')

Fhun Warn Aiy Joob : ฝัน-หวาน-อาย-จูบ (feat. Ploy Natcha)
Lhub Tha : หลับตา
Pleng Nueng : เพลงหนึ่ง

- Light in the Dark Vol. 1 -The Traveler

Summer
Love Confession : Kum Bork Rak
My Princess : Jao Ying
Love is Not Everything (Thai version)
The Light : Saeng Sawang
Far Away : Klai
The Journey : Tasanajorn
The Traveller : Nakdernthang
Old Pals (feat. JuiJuis)
The Light : Saeng Sawang (acoustic version)
Love is Not Everything (Mandarin version)

== Appearances ==
=== Love of Siam ===
Two young men go from friends to lovers as one stands on the verge of stardom in this drama from Thailand. Mew and Tong were best friends as children, and Tong's sister Tang was a close confidant to them both. Years later, Mew (Witwisit Hiranyawongkul) has become a professional musician, and he's the lead singer and songwriter with a pop group, August, who are poised to achieve major commercial success. One day, Mew happens to meet Tong (Mario Maurer) for the first time in years, and the two waste no time getting reacquainted; while Tong have a girlfriend, it becomes clear that there's a bond between them that they've never felt with other people, and their friendship begins to grow into something deeper. Meanwhile, Tong's family is still reeling from Tang's mysterious disappearance several years before, and her father, Korn (Songsit Roongnophakunsri), has become a hopeless alcoholic. When Tong meets June (Chermarn Boonyasak), a personal assistant for August, he's struck by her uncanny resemblance to Tang, and asks her to pose as his sister in hopes her presence will help his father snap out of his depression. Rak Hang Siam (a.k.a. Love of Siam) was written and directed by Chookiat Sakveerakul, who also had a hand in writing the songs for the film.

=== Dream (4Romances) ===
The story was about a little girl named Ton Kheaw who is so obsessed with the August Band. She entered the magical land of the dream world where she partakes in an adventure with the band. The August Band -to be led by Pchy- has made a deal with "Mr. Bird", unknowingly selling their souls to him(Like Robert Johnson at the Crossroads). The band wanted to end the deal but the only key for them to survive is if Tong Khaew will wake up. Mr. Bird transformed into a Devil Black Cat searching for Tong Khaew and the August Band members to kill them. The band members transformed into cartoon forms to gain powers while Tong Khaew became a wide-eyed anime little girl. They'd tried to escape and protect each other from the Black Cat and eventually beat it up with the help of Boy-Tong Khaew's boyfriend. They all went back to human form and relived their normal lives.

=== Old Pals ===
เพื่อนไม่เก่า "Old Pals"
- Directed by: Kriangkrai Vachiratamporn
- Screenplay by: Kriangkrai Vachiratamporn
- Story by: Kriangkrai Vachiratamporn; Chookiat Sakveerakul
- Produced by: Somsak Techaratanaprasert; Chookiat Sakveerakul; Sukanya Vongsthapat; Prachya Pinkaew
- Starring: Nattapong Navasinlawat; Witwisit Hiranyawongkul; Chanon Rikulsuranakan; Naphanthanut Poungoomsin; Atthanan Pitaseth; Pathomwat Wansukprasert; Voraphat Dejkajonwuth; Napassorn Eiamcharoen; Jarinya Aksornnan; Alice Tsoi
- Cinematography: Pramett Chankrasae
- Edited by: Kriangkrai Vachiratamporn
- Production company: Baa-Ram-Ewe
- Distributed by: Sahamongkolfilm International
- Release date: 26 May 2011
- Running time: 89 minutes
- Country: Thailand
- Language: Thai

In this road movie, five close friends make an oath at a Buddhist temple that they will ride bicycles from Bangkok to Lampang if Nut (Nattapong Navasinlawat, "Ong") gets accepted to college in Lampang. Two years later, Nut is accepted, and the friends start the journey to fulfill the oath. A childhood friend, sullen Bas (Witwisit Hiranwongkul, "Pchy") is invited to join them since he knows the route. Stopping overnight, they meet AomAm (Napassorn Eiamcharoen, "Cream") in a massage parlor, and she joins the group also. Along the way, the friends have many experiences and encounter obstacles which make their longtime friendship even stronger. The movie is sometimes referred to with an unofficial, alternate English title "August Friends", a clever double entendre, because the word "august" can mean "venerable".
