= Matika =

Matika is a name with multiple origins. It can be a feminine given name or a surname. Notable people with this name include:

== As a given name ==
- Matika Arthakornsiripho (Thai: มาติกา อรรถกรศิริโพธิ์; born 1986), a Thai model and actress
- Matika Wilbur (born 1984), a Native American photographer and teacher

== As a surname ==
- Jeff Matika, a guitarist and vocalist from the band "Green Day"
- Mangaliso Matika, a South African politician
- Michael Matika (born 1983), a South African former cricketer
