= Montfort College =

Coordinates: 18.7725°N 99.0006°E

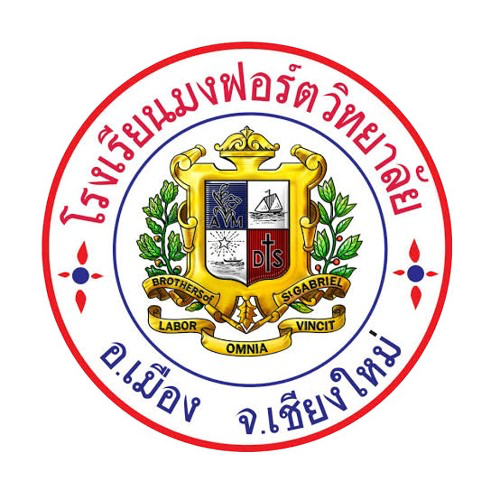

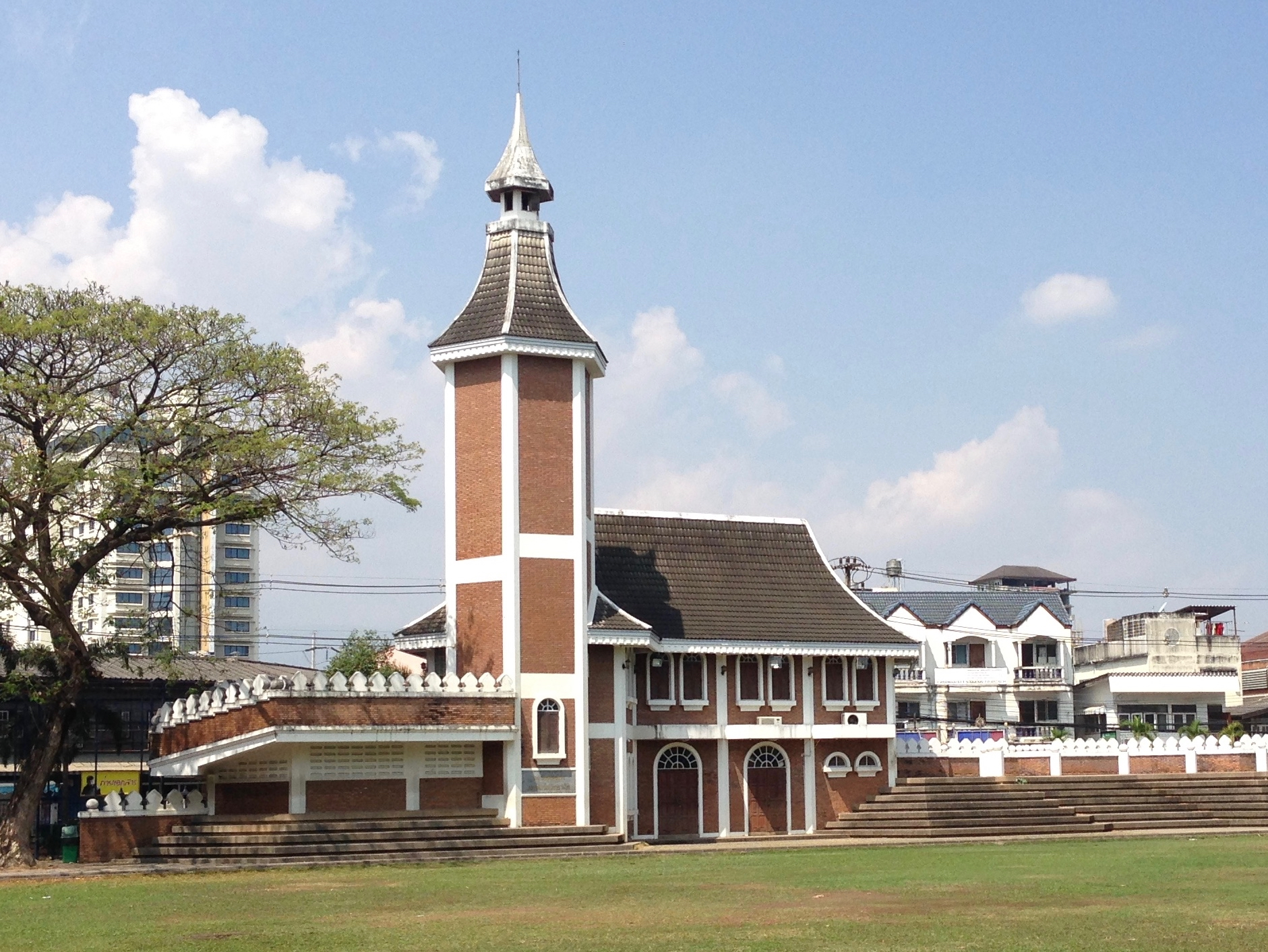
- Montfort College, Primary Section

Location
- 269 Charoenprathet Rd. Changpeuk, Muang; Northern Thailand; Chiang Mai, Chiang Mai Province, 50000; Thailand

Information
- School type: Private school
- Motto: Labor Omnia Vincit (Latin); Labor Conquers All Things
- Religious affiliations: Catholic (Gabrielite Brothers)
- Established: March 16, 1932; 94 years ago
- Founder: St. Gabriel Foundation
- Status: In Operation
- School district: Mueang Chiang Mai District
- Director: Sir.Thaksabut Kraiprasit, f.s.g. (Primary school); Sir.Chamnan Laorakphon, f.s.g. (Secondary school)
- Patron: St. Louis de Montfort
- Faculty: est. 600
- Grades: 1–12
- Enrollment: 5,600
- Language: (Thailand) Thai (United Kingdom) English (France) French (China) Mandarin Chinese (Japan) Japanese
- Colours: Red, white, blue
- Song: Thai Version: March Montfort; English Version: Come Cheer
- Sports: Track and field, futsal, football, 7-a-side football, swimming, chairball, volleyball, badminton
- Website: http://www.mcp.ac.th/ (Primary) http://www.montfort.ac.th (Secondary)

Montfort College (Thai: มงฟอร์ตวิทยาลัย) is a private Catholic school in Chiang Mai, Thailand. It was established on March 16, 1932.

Montfort College has 2 locations: One for primary students (grade 1-6) beside the Ping river, and one for secondary (grade 7-12) beside the SRT's Northern Line. It is widely regarded as one of the best schools in Northern Thailand.

== History ==
The reputation of Assumption College Bangkok attracted students from Chiang Mai to study in Bangkok since 1910. Brother F. Hilaire and Brother Michael were then invited to open a school in Chiang Mai. Archbishop of Siam at the time, René-Marie-Joseph Perrot, and Father George Mirabel agreed that opening Catholic schools in Chiang Mai would help spread Christianity. Therefore, the Ursuline Sisters and the Brothers of Saint Gabriel were invited to open a School to accept both boys and girls.

The Brothers of St. Gabriel came to Chiang Mai and established Montfort Primary School in 1932 along Charoen Prathet Road on a 5-acre (20,000 m^{2}) plot of land provided by Bishop Peross from Luang Anusarn Suntorn who gave his financial support at no interest. The land was located along the Ping River, approximately 200 meters from the Sacred Heart Church. Montfort School opened its first academic year on 16 March 1932. Fr. Reunemenier was the manager, Brother Simeon Ricole the first director, Brother Ambrosio the vice-director and Brother Louis was responsible for new construction.

Montfort College, circa 1951

Montfort College opened its secondary section in 1949, and only started to admit girls to its secondary section from levels 10–12 in 1975, and started to admit girls to its primary section in 2009.

== General Information ==
=== Montfort College Primary Section ===
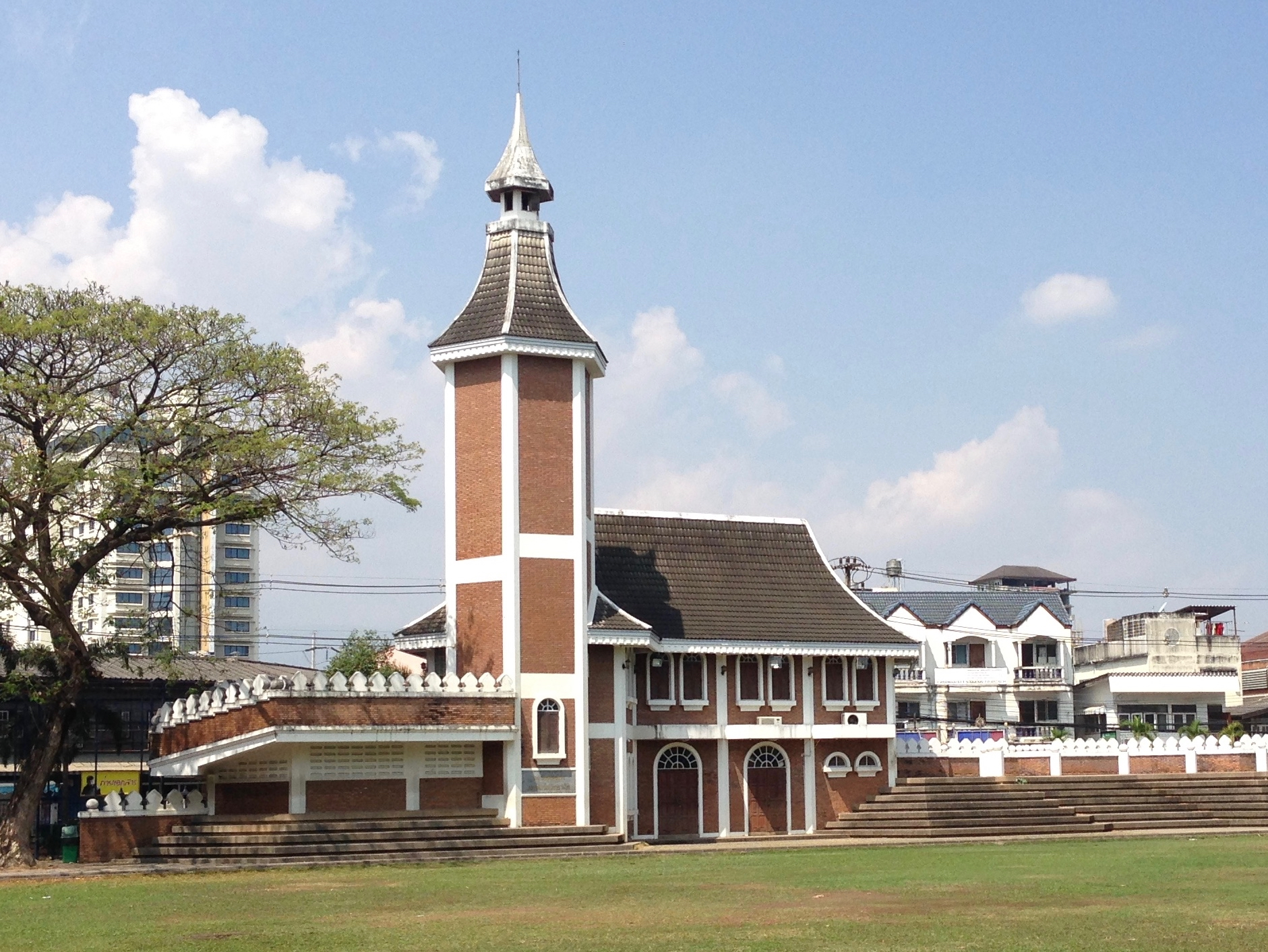
Montfort College Alumni Association building, at Montfort College Primary

Located at Charoen Prathet Road, Chang Khlan Subdistrict, Mueang Chiang Mai District, Chiang Mai Province, It includes the following buildings and facilities.

- Montfort Building
- Mary Building
- Administration Building
- Samakkee Narumit Building
- St. Louis Marie Learning Centre (Library, Computer and Robotics Room)
- The Assumption Building
- St. Gabriel Hall Building (Canteen and Auditorium)
- Mary's Pavillion (Multipurpose indoor space)
- Music Building
- Green Dome (Multipurpose outdoor space)
- Montfort College Alumni Association Building
- Facilities around the Administration Building which include a welfare office, guidance counseling office, student affairs, academic affairs, and pastoral care office.

=== Montfort College Secondary Section ===
Located at Montfort Road, Tha Sala Subdistrict, Mueang Chiang Mai District, Chiang Mai Province, It includes the following buildings and facilities.

Saint Mary building, at Montfort College Secondary Section.

- André Gueguen Building (St. Joseph Auditorium and Indoor sports)
- Administration Building
- Ambrosio Building
- André Gymnasium (Multipurpose indoor space, Canteen, Underground parking, E-sports room)
- Banyat Rojanaroon Sports Stadium (Track and Field, with planned single-tier stands)
- De Montfort Swimming Pool Building (Swimming pool and table tennis room)
- Peter Building
- Emmanuel Building
- Serafin Building
- Antonio Building
- Albert Building
- Saint Aloysius Building
- Saint Gabriel's Residence
- Saint Mary Building (Music Department)
- Montfort Arena (Multipurpose Shaded Outdoor Sports space)
- Montfort Garden (Recreational Outdoor Space, Café)]

Every building in the secondary school is air-conditioned, with the main buildings connected via skywalks on every floor.

== Offered Classes ==
Montfort College has two sections: Primary (grades 1–6) and secondary (grades 7–12). In 2013, the secondary section had 3,238 students, while the primary had approximately 2,400 students. The primary school has two teaching syllabuses: Normal Programme (Bilingual), and English Programme.

The secondary school offers classes as follows:

=== Grade 7-9 ===
- Gifted Bilingual Programme: Gifted Science-Mathematics, Gifted English, Gifted Digital and Technology
- Bilingual Programme
- English Programme: English Programme, and International Programme (Only Grade 7, 8).

=== Grade 10-12 ===
- Gifted Bilingual Programme: Gifted Mathematics-English, Gifted Chemistry, Gifted English, Gifted Biology, Gifted Thai, Gifted Physics, Gifted Mathematics, Gifted Digital and Technology
- Bilingual Programme
- Liberal Arts Programme: Music, Japanese, Mandarin, French
- English Programme: English Programme Science-Mathematics, English Programme Business Arts, and International Programme (Only Grade 10, 11).

== Notable alumni ==
- Thaksin Shinawatra – The 23rd Prime Minister of Thailand, former owner of English Premier League football club Manchester City
- Prince Wonglak na Chiangmai – Head of Northern Dynasty
- Surapong Tovichakchaikul – Deputy Prime Minister
- Tarrin Nimmanahaeminda – Minister
- Tawatwong na Chiang Mai – Minister
- Sukrit Wisetkaew – singer and actor
- Witwisit Hirunwongkul – actor and singer
- Chookiat Sakveerakul – film director
- Panupong Wongsa – footballer
- Pattadon Janngeon - actor and singer
- Thanawat Rattanakitpaisan - actor and singer
- Nalin Wangphol - singer and actress
- Landokmai Sripasang - Lead singer for LANDOKMAI
