= Phikun Thong =

- Opening theme: "Phikun Thong Sadness "
- Country of origin: Thailand
- No. of episodes: 25

Production
- Running time: approx. 40-45 minutes (per episode)

Original release
- Network: BBTV Channel 7
- Release: 2003 – 2003

Related
- Yo Phra Klin (2003)

Phikun Thong (Thai: พิกุลทอง) is a Thai Boran Lakorn which has been remade several times. It stars Matika Arthakornsiripho as Nang Pi Goun tong, and is based on Thai Mythology. Phikun (พิกุล) is a type of flower. Thong (ทอง) means gold, and is also the name of the main character.

== Plot ==
Phikun Thong is the daughter of the king, and was born with a gold flower in her mouth. A fortuneteller predicts that Phikun will bring bad luck to the kingdom, and that the king must abandon Phikun. The king follows the fortuneteller's advice and keeps Phikun away from the kingdom. A childless man finds her and cares for her, though his pregnant wife does not approve. When Phikun grows up, her adopted mother abuses her both physically and verbally. She demands that Phikun give her the gold, but Phikun, unwilling to give it to a cruel person like her, refuses. The mother refuses to feed her, though the father remains kind. Phikun runs away.

When Phikun grows up, a prince falls in love with her, but a giantess is jealous of Phikun's beauty. She transforms Phikun into a monkey and makes herself appear to be Phikun. After giantess fools the prince into thinking she is the woman he loves, Phikun finds a way to break the curse and reunites with him.
