= Landokmai =

Thai indie-pop band

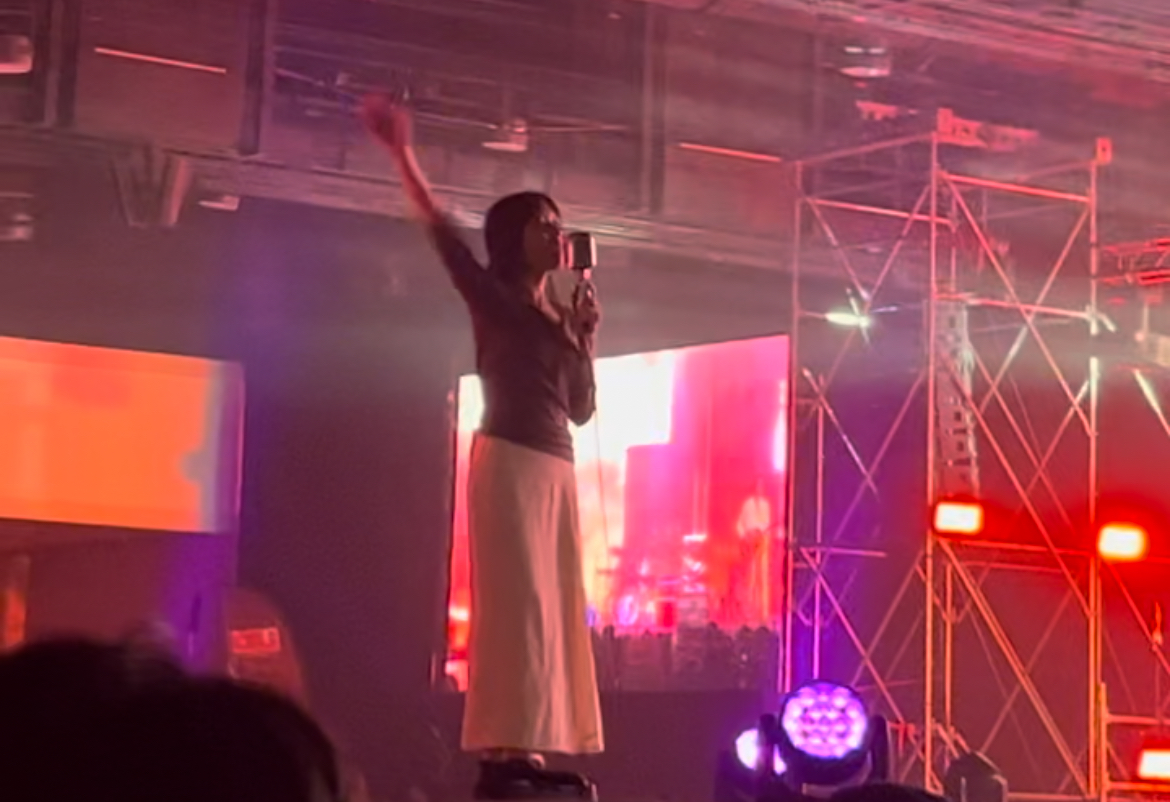
- Landokmai at the Cat T-Shirt Music Festival 2023.

Background information
- Origin: Bangkok, Thailand
- Genres: Indie pop; Dream pop
- Years active: 2018–Present
- Label: What the Duck
- Members: Landokmai Sripasang (Upim); Manassanan Kingkasem (Ant)

Landokmai (Thai: ลานดอกไม้) is a Thai indie-dream pop band. They started the band in 2018 by covering songs and uploading them on YouTube. Landokmai became known for their song "Please Be True" when they debuted under What the Duck in 2020.

== Early life ==
Upim and Ant, the two members of Landokmai, studied together at the College of Music, Mahidol University in 2018. The two formed the band by first covering Polycat's song "Aworn" and uploading it to YouTube, which received a positive response and led them to decide to write their own songs.

"Keep Dokmai" (2019) was the band's first song, created when they had to submit a song as a university assignment. Later that same year, they released "On The Train" and "The Diary". In 2020, Landokmai debuted as an artist under What the Duck with the songs "Please Be True" and "It's Me... Here I Am", both of which were influenced by the music style of The Beatles. The song was originally made as an English version for a school assignment, but they later adapted it into Thai and released their first EP album, Over The Sun, in the same year.

In 2021, the band released "Duai Jai Yindi", which focuses on conveying love stories in a more realistic way rather than through dreamy storytelling. They also released "Suksan Wan Sutthai", a collaborative song with Whal & Dolph. In 2022, Landokmai released "Tsuki (Phra Chan)", which was inspired by an ancient Japanese poem describing the wide range of human emotions. They also released "B-D-BUB-BA", whose title comes from a phrase Upim often likes to hum. In 2023, the band released "Ko Loi Fa", inspired by the animated film studio Studio Ghibli and the anime film Castle in the Sky. They also released "Taxi", Landokmai's first fully English-language song, and "Phleng Rak Phleng Raek", the first song by the band since their formation in 2018 to tell a story of fulfilled love.

== Discography ==
=== Singles ===
Years	Title	Album	Notes
2018	Kep Dokmai	Non-album Singles	
2019	On The Train	Non-album Singles	
2019	The Diary	Non-album Singles	
2020	Please Be True	Over The Sun	
2020	It's me	Over The Sun	
2021	Blur Heart (Homie Session)	Non-album Singles	
2021	Our Sunset (Homie Session)	Non-album Singles	
2021	Duay Jai Yindi	Non-album Singles	
2021	Suksan Wan Suttaai	Non-album Singles	featuring Whal & Dolph
2022	Tsuki	Non-album Singles	
2022	Tsuki (Japanese Version)	Non-album Singles	
2022	B-D-BUB-BA	All My Purple Feelings	
2023	Still	All My Purple Feelings	
2023	Taxi	All My Purple Feelings	
2023	Taxi (Acoustic Version)	Non-album Singles	
2023	Blooming	All My Purple Feelings	
2023	Echo	All My Purple Feelings	
2024	Yom (Acoustic Version)	Non-album Singles	
2024	Wishful	Non-album Singles	
2024	Blooming (Live Session)	Non-album Singles	Featuring James Alyn
2025	HEARSAY	WHAT EVE?	
2025	Finger paint	WHAT EVE?	featuring Seol Hoseung (SURL)
2025	Winter Breeze	To be announced	

=== Studio albums ===
Title	Details	Tracklist
All My Purple Feelings	Released: February 1, 2024; Format: CD, digital download, streaming; Label: What the Duck	1. Welcome to My Purple Story; 2. Muearai Thi Khitthueng Thoe; 3. Ko Loi Fa; 4. Yom; 5. Ruedu Fan; 6. Blooming; 7. B-D-BUB-BA; 8. Taxi; 9. I miss you when I'm drunk 10. Nai Wan Phrungni Kho Hai Pen Wan Thi Di; 11. I'm saying goodbye

=== Extended plays ===
Title	Details	Tracklist
Over The Sun	Released: November 19, 2020; Format: CD, digital download, streaming; Label: What the Duck	1. Please Be True; 2. It's me 3. Blur Heart; 4. Our Sunset
WHAT EVE?	Released: June 10, 2025; Format: CD, digital download, streaming; Label: What the Duck	1. Hearsay; 2. Finger paint 3. Love me still 4. Mr. Masterpiece; 5. Bye Bye Neverland

=== Soundtrack appearances ===
Years	Title	Album	Notes
2021	Friday (Acoustic Version)	Homie Acoustic	Original - Plastic Plastic
2023	home	-	featuring What The Duck artists
2024	magical moment 2584	éphémère (Original Soundtrack)	Soundtrack for the anime "éphémère"
2024	For My Brother	Back to The Bekery Vol.1	Original - Pause
2025	Yom (Valentine Version)	-	Featuring Dept

=== Guest appearances ===
Years	Title	Artist	Notes
2020	Summertime	YEW	
2020	Loved You Wrong	Rocketman	UPIM's vocal
2021	Pencil Mark	na t.	UPIM's vocal
2022	Timeless	imnutt	UPIM's vocal
2022	Long Night	Uncle Ben	ANT's vocal
2022	Lost Jigsaw	guncharlie	UPIM's vocal
2023	LOVE MOON	ELEVEN	
2023	Wind	loserpop	
2024	Birdsong	Dept	
2024	Don't Know How	Varis	
2025	Niyai Rak	Manutsawee	
