= The Toys (Thai musician) =

Thai musician (born 1995)

- ธันวา บุญสูงเนิน
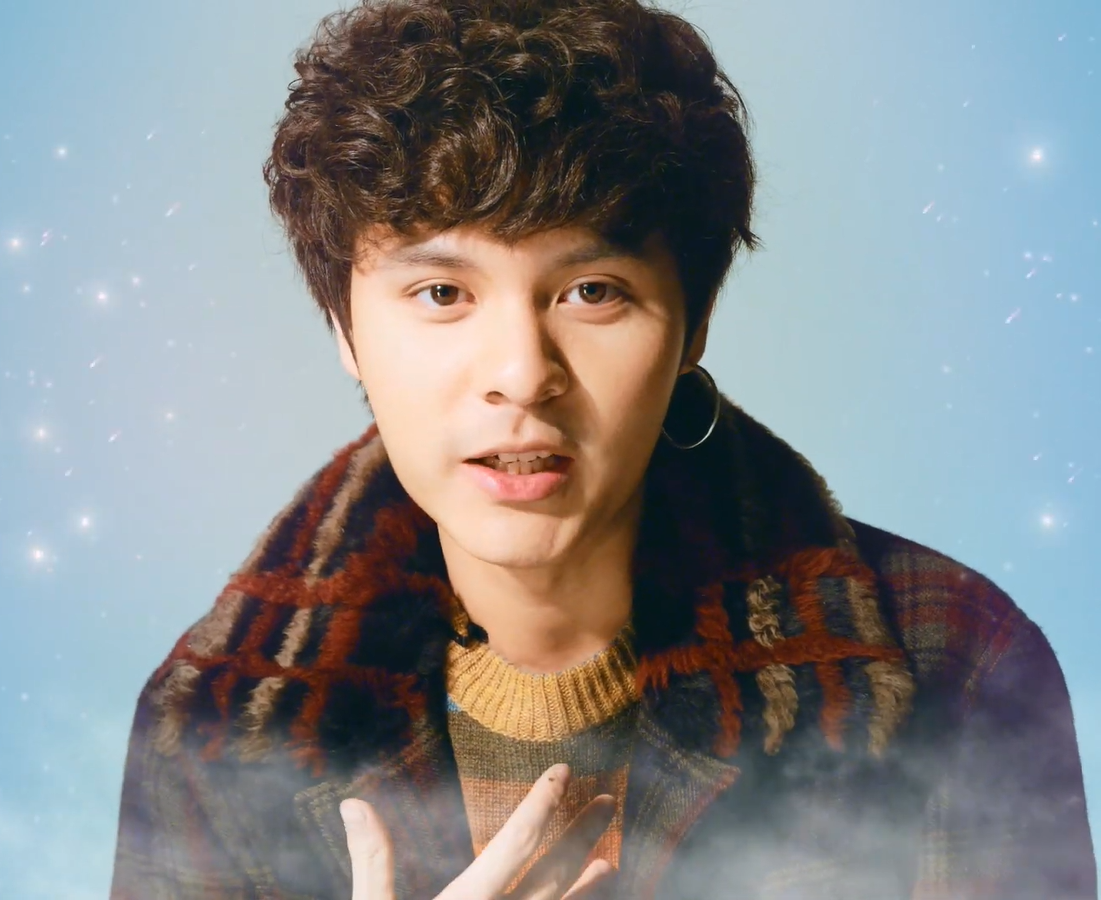
- The Toys in 2019
- Born: Thanwa Boonsoongnern; 1 December 1995 (age 30); Nakhon Ratchasima Province, Thailand
- Occupations: Singer; songwriter; record producer; guitarist
- Years active: 2015–present
- Spouse: Phantira Luesophon (m. 2026)
- Musical career
- Genres: Synth-Pop; R&B; Jazz
- Instruments: Vocals; guitar; bass; piano; synthesizer; drums
- Label: What The Duck
- Website: Official website

Thanwa Boonsoongnern (Thai: ธันวา บุญสูงเนิน; born 1 December 1995), known professionally as The Toys, is a Thai singer, rapper, songwriter, musician and record producer. His song, "Na Nao Tee Laew (Last Winter)" went viral, getting him signed to What The Duck record company soon after.

After winning the 9th Overdrive Guitar Contest when he was 18, The Toys added bass, ukulele, piano, keyboards, synthesiser and drums. He writes, arranges, and plays all the instruments, and does the mixing and mastering.

The Toys came from a music family. He is the only son of Nittaya Boonsoongnern, a Thai pop singer from the 80s-90s, and the nephew of transsexual singer, Jern Jern Boonsoongnern.

== Early life ==
Thanwa Boonsoongnern was born in Nakorn Ratchasima, Thailand. His parents are divorced and his mother is a music producer, songwriter, and musician.

He started playing guitar and drums at age seven. He entered guitar contests, including Light Ibanez Guitar Solo Competition 2014 where he placed second. He finished 5th at the Kiesel Guitars Solo Contest and won the 9th Overdrive Guitar Contest in 2016.

== Career ==
=== 2015-2016: YouTube ===
Boonsoongnern first released his song, Na Nao Tee Laew (Last Winter) on his YouTube channel, THURSDAY, in 2015 and it went viral in Thailand and got covered several times by Thai celebrities.

=== 2017-Present: First album debut, "SUN" ===
He signed to What The Duck records in April, 2017 and released his debut single, "Gon Ruedoo Fon (Before the Rain)", which received heavy airplay in Thailand.

The Toys was invited to work with older artists, including Lipta, & Boyd Kosiyabong and did soundtracks for movies and TV commercials.

In October 2018, he released his first album, "SUN".

== Personal life ==
He married his longtime girlfriend, Phantira Luesophon, in November 2026.

== Recognition ==
- 2018 : NineEntertain Awards - Solo Artist of The Year (WON)
- 2018 : OK! Awards - Male Rising Star (WON)
- 2018 : LINE TV Awards - Best Song Gon Rudoo Fon (Before The Rain) (Nominated)
- 2018 : JOOX Thailand Music Awards - Pop Song of The Year Na Nao Tee Laew (Last Winter) (WON)
- 2018 : JOOX Thailand Music Awards - Song of The Year Na Nao Tee Laew (Last Winter) (WON)
- 2018 : JOOX Thailand Music Awards - Popular Artist of The Year Na Nao Tee Laew (Last Winter) (WON)
- 2018 : MNET Asian Music Awards - Best New Asian Artist Thailand (WON)

== Discography ==
=== Studio album ===
- 2018 : SUN

=== EP ===
- 2016 : I Beg Your Pardon
