= Kriangkrai Vachiratamporn =

Thai producer, director and screenwriter

Kriangkrai "Ping" Vachiratamporn (Thai: เกรียงไกร วชิรธรรมพร (ปิง); born c. 1985) is a Thai producer, director and screenwriter.

Kriangkrai graduated from the Faculty of Communication Arts at Chulalongkorn University, and began working primarily as a screenwriter. He co-wrote the films 4 Romance (2008) and Before Valentine (2009) before directing his first solo feature August Friends, which was released in 2011. He then joined the writing team for Nadao Bangkok's 2013 hit TV series Hormones, before becoming director for its second and third seasons. He would go on to co-direct GDH 559's 2016 film A Gift, and write and co-produce multiple works with GDH and Nadao.
