= 4 Romance =

2008 Thai romantic comedy film

- Theatrical release poster
- Thai: ฝัน-หวาน-อาย-จูบ หรือ
- Directed by: Chukiat Sakveerakul; Prachya Pinkaew; Bhandit Thongdee; Rachain Limtrakul
- Written by: Rachain Limtrakul; Piyaros Thongdee; Kriangkrai Vachiratamporn; Eakasit Thairaat; Chukiat Sakveerakul
- Produced by: Prachya Pinkaew; Sukanya Vongsthapat; Sita Vosbein
- Starring: Mario Maurer; Kanya Rattanapetch; Shahkrit Yamnarm; Witwisit Hiranyawongkul
- Cinematography: Tiwa Moeithaisong; Teerawat Rujintham; Yukontorn Mingmongkon; Chitti Urnorakankij
- Edited by: Prapob Surasakulwat; Rachain Limtrakul; Wichit Wattananon; Chukiat Sakveerakul
- Music by: Nimit Jitranon; Kitti Kuremanee; Varoot Phasuthadol; Napatr Yuvachitti
- Distributed by: Sahamongkol Film International
- Release date: 25 December 2008
- Running time: 128 minutes
- Country: Thailand
- Language: Thai
- Box office: $1,424,592

4 Romance (Thai: ฝัน-หวาน-อาย-จูบ, romanized: Fan Waan Aai Joop) is a 2008 Thai romantic comedy film directed by four directors: Chukiat Sakveerakul, Prachya Pinkaew, Bhandit Thongdee, and Rachain Limtrakul.

== Plot ==
The film is a melodrama, comedy, action, time-shifting psychological mystery and a cartoon fantasy put together in one film. The film is divided into four short segments titled DREAM, SWEET, SHY, KISS (Fan Waan Aai Joop).

The first segment is titled KISS (Joop). It is a story about a guy named 'Lothario' who steals kisses from his friend's girlfriends. Now that his eyes are set on Gaga, the girlfriend of his friend Beaver, Beaver confronts Lothario at the 'boxing gym' and there they have a boxing fight and Beaver ensures that the guy won't able to kiss his girlfriend. Beaver wins and kisses Gaga.

Next is SHY (Aai), in which Tong, a rich girl from the city, goes to a remote tropical island looking for a spot to build her spa and resort. After some argument with the boatman she is left stranded on the island. There is waiting her tour guide, she is shocked to find out that the tour guide is her ex-boyfriend Durian, who left her without any words. It has been revealed that Durian left Tong because he felt embarrassed and shy about his modest upbringing background to Tong Hi-class profile. At night they drink with Durian's friend and there Tong got drunk and expresses her feelings towards Durian. After that night, Tong has been fetched in the island by one of her staff and left Durian. Then Durian noticed that Tong has forgotten her sketch Pad and there he saw sketches of the two of them. The weather is not good. Durian borrow his friend's boat and follow Tong. He saw Tong and there they hug one another with tear drops fell from Tong's face.

The third segment is SWEET (Waan), a story about a middle-aged couple, Shane and Waan. Shane, a hard-working architect, is about to go a business trip which his wife, did not want him to attend. He told Shane he better not come back if he still go to the business trip, yet Shane still go, leaving Waan alone. Gradually it becomes clear that all is not well with Waan. When Shane returns home, he finds Waan is not the same anymore. The story shows stories from their teenage years that made Waan so upset.

The last segment is DREAM (Fan). The story involves a little girl, Ton Kheaw, who is so obsessed with the boy-band August, that she becomes lost in a vivid dream world, where she takes part in a magical adventure with the band. Also August, led by Pichy, has made a deal with the Devil Black Cat. Like Robert Johnson at the Crossroads, they sold their souls. In human form, the black cat named "Mr. Bird". August wants out of the deal and the only key to survive is at Tong Khaew. The band members transform into cartoon animal beings, and Tong Khaew becomes a wide-eyed anime little girl. They'd tried to escape from the black cat and beat it up. They went back to being a human.

== Cast ==
Segment 1: KISS (Joop)

- Mario Maurer as Beaver
- Apissara Tudti as Gaga
- Nattaphong Aroonnet as Phed/Lothario
- Thanaphatrapong Piang U-Ta as Han
- Arporn Meebangyang

Segment 2: SHY (Aai)

- Kanya Rattanapetch as Thong
- Pakorn Chatborirak as Durian
- Teerawat Mulvilan as Nguk
- Rapeeporn Homnan as Nuey
- Boonkasem Saekow as Prasit
- Sophn Phoonsawat as Warnjeab

Segment 3: SWEET (Waan)

- Shahkrit Yamnarm
- Wasit Pongsopha
- Apinya Sakuljaroensuk

Segment 4: DREAM (Fan)

- Witwisit Hiranyawongkul as Pitch
- Chanon Rikulsurakarn as Non
- Jenjira Jamniansri as Tonkaw
- Pathomwat Wansukpraset as Nine
- Nattapong Navasinlawut as Ong
- Attanan Piyaseth as Wan
- Naphanthanut Poungoomisin as Tor
- Suwapat Songsiangxhai as Mac
- Voraphat Dejkajonwath as Mike
- Watcharit Avasiriphong as Arm
- Tekatath Nuntawaleekul as Jo
- Paskorn Wiroonsap as Petch
- Juruvit Laiviratana as Boy
- Teemah Kanjanapairin as Bird

== Release and reception ==
4 Romance was released in Thailand in December 2008. Its total gross was $1,424,592.

== DVD release ==
The standard DVD for 4 Romance was released on 28 February 2009, and is available in widescreen, and a Thai Dolby Digital 5.1 and Dolby 2.0 Surround track.

The film was also released in 4 VCD formats which includes the four segments of the film.
