= Thawachwong Na Chiengmai =

Thai politician (born 1945)

- ธวัชวงศ์ ณ เชียงใหม่
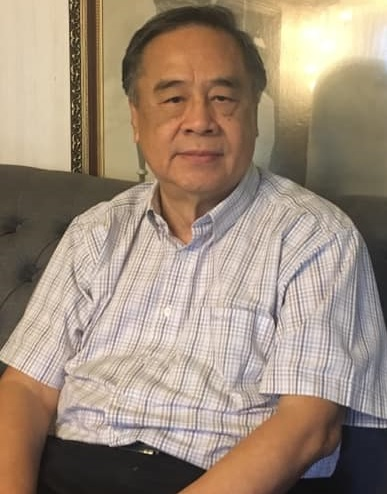

Deputy Minister of Finance
- In office 25 November 1996 – 24 October 1997
- Prime Minister: Chavalit Yongchaiyudh

Deputy Minister of Public Health
- In office 13 July 1995 – 24 October 1996
- Prime Minister: Banharn Silpa-archa

Deputy Minister of Foreign Affairs
- In office 24 October 1997 – 8 November 1997
- Prime Minister: Chavalit Yongchaiyudh

Personal details
- Born: 14 December 1945 (age 80) Chiang Mai, Thailand
- Party: Democrat Party
- Spouse: Kingkan na Chiang Mai
- Education: North Carolina State

Military service
- Allegiance: Thailand
- Branch/service: Volunteer Defense Corps
- Rank: VDC Lt.Col.

Thawachwong Na Chiengmai (Thai: ธวัชวงศ์ ณ เชียงใหม่; RTGS: Thawatwong Na Chiangmai, December 14, 1945- ) is a Thailand politician who served as Thailand's Deputy Minister of Finance from 1996 until 1997, Deputy Minister of Public Health from 1996 until 1997 and the Deputy Minister of Foreign Affairs 1997.

== History ==
Prince Thawachwong Na Chiengmai was born on December 14, 1945. He is the son of Chao Chaisuriwong Na Chiang Mai and Mae Tem. He had the nickname "Prince Nuy." In 1952 he began his studies at Montfort College in Chiang Mai and in 1965 he transferred to the North Carolina State University in North Carolina.

== Royal decorations ==
- Knight Grand Cordon (Special Class) of the Most Exalted Order of the White Elephant
- Knight Grand Cordon (Special Class) of The Most Noble Order of the Crown of Thailand
