= Chutavuth Pattarakampol =

Thai actor and host (born 1993)

- จุฑาวุฒิ ภัทรกำพล
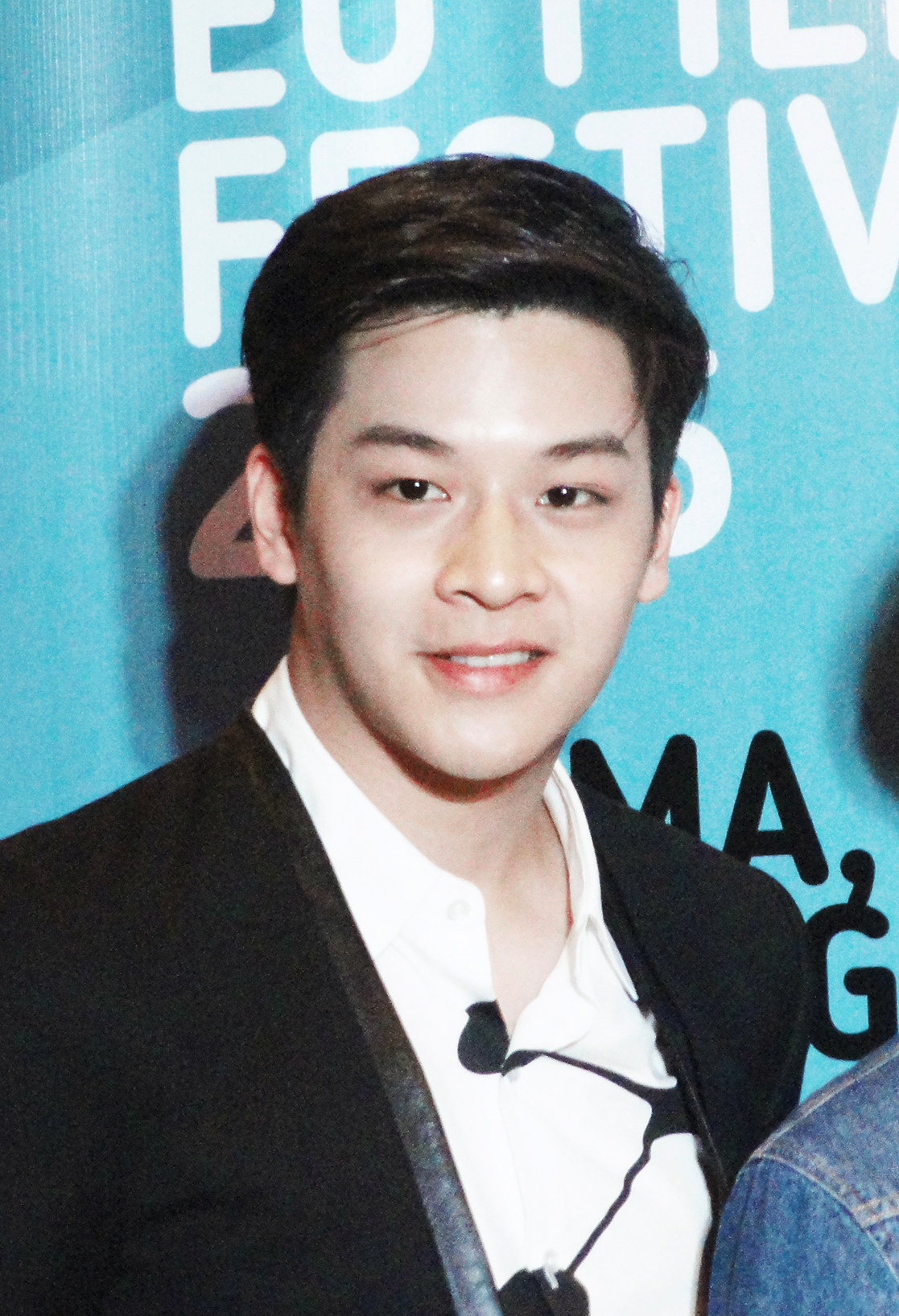
- Chutavuth Pattarakampol in 2015
- Born: 21 March 1993 (age 33); Bangkok, Thailand
- Other name: March
- Education: Faculty of Commerce and Accountancy at Chulalongkorn University
- Occupations: Actor; television host; YouTuber
- Years active: 2012 – present
- Agents: GMM Tai Hub (2012–2015); SPICY DISC; GMM Tai Hub (2016–present)
- Known for: Home; Hormones: The Series

Chutavuth Pattarakampol (Thai: จุฑาวุฒิ ภัทรกำพล, born 21 March 1993), also known as March, is a Thai actor and host. He is known for his role in Hormones: The Series.

== Early life and education ==
Chutavuth was born on 21 March 1993 in Bangkok, Thailand. He attended Saint Gabriel's College, Suankularb Wittayalai School and earned a bachelor's degree from the Faculty of Commerce and Accountancy at Chulalongkorn University in 2015.

== Personal life ==
He is fond of playing football and swimming.

== Filmography ==
=== Film ===
| Year | Title | Role | Ref. |
|---|---|---|---|
| 2012 | Home | Ne | |
| 2014 | The Swimmers | Pert | |

=== Television series ===
| Year | Series | Role | Notes | Ref. |
|---|---|---|---|---|
| 2010 | Opas | | Guest | |
| 2013–2015 | Hormones: The Series | Phubes "Phu" Pattarakamporn | Season 1-2 (main), Season 3 (guest) | |
| 2014 | ThirTEEN Terrors | Aun | Main | |
| 2015 | Ban Lang Mek | Pakorn Nateepitak | Main | |
| 2015 | Malee: The Series | Minho | Main | |
| 2015 | Love Songs Love Stories: Glup Kum Sia | Korn | Main | |
| 2016 | Lovey Dovey | Daoneu | Main | |
| 2016 | Club Friday 8 | | Main | |
| 2017 | Club Friday The Series Season 8: True Love…or Old Flame | Pong | Main | |
| 2017 | U-Prince :The Badly Politics | Brian | Supporting | |
| 2017 | Slam Dance | Singh | Main | |
| 2017 | U-Prince: The Ambitious Boss | Brian | Main | |
| 2017 | Lhong Fai | Chon Naka | Main | |
| 2018–2019 | Ban Saran Land: Suparburoot Sut Soi | Sun | Main | |
| 2018 | Kiss Me Again | R | Main | |
| 2018 | Khun Por Jorm Sa | Sinthorn | Main | |
| 2019 | Club Friday The Series 10: Khon Tee Mai Yorm Rub | Bew | Main | |
| 2019 | Sucker Kick | Note | Main | |
| 2019 | The Sand Princess | Jirapat "Ji" | Main | |
| 2019 | The Stranded | Anan | Main | |
| 2020 | Pen Tor Uncensored | | Main | |
| 2021 | Prajan Daeng | | Supporting | |
| 2025 | Dating Game | Hill | Main; Thai-Japanese drama | |

== See also ==
- List of Thai male actors
- List of YouTubers
