= Scared (film) =

- Thailand theatrical poster
- Directed by: Pakphum Wonjinda
- Written by: Pakphum Wonjinda
- Produced by: Prachya Pinkaew; Sukanya Vongsthapat; Sita Vosbein; Somsak Techaratanaprasert (Executive)
- Starring: Sumonrat Wattanaselarat; Wongthep Khunarattanrat; Kanya Rattanapetch; Amornpan Kongtrakarn
- Cinematography: Jiradech Samniangsanor
- Edited by: Tawat Siripong
- Music by: Phatai Puangjeen
- Distributed by: Sahamongkol Film International
- Release date: 10 November 2005
- Running time: 87 minutes
- Country: Thailand
- Language: Thai

Rab Nong Sayong Kwan (Thai: รับน้องสยองขวัญ), known in English as Scared, is a 2005 Thai horror film directed by Pakphum Wonjinda. In this movie, a group of freshmen on a road trip survive an accident, only to end up in an abandoned town where they are hunted down and killed one by one.

== Cast ==
- Sumonrat Wattanaselarat as Pii May
- Wongthep Khunarattantrat as Jonathan
- Kanya Rattanapetch as Tarn
- Amornpan Kongtrakarn as Mew
- Atchara Sawangwai as Awm
- Kenta Tsujiya as Kenta
- Buanphot Jaikanthaa as Mai
- Chatchawan Sida as Bawmp
- Matika Arthakornsiripho as Tan
- Thewin Khunarattanawat
- Chidjun Hung
- Kantapat Permpoonpatcharasuk
- Sirilapas Kongtrakarn
- Panthila Fuklin
- Nonthapun Jaikunta
