= Kanya Rattanapetch =

Thai actress and model (born 1989)

- กัญญา รัตนเพชร์
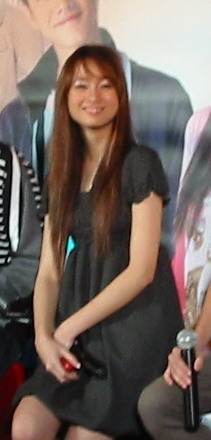
- Kanya at a press conference in 2008
- Born: Kanya Rattanapetch; 2 November 1989 (age 36); Bangkok, Thailand
- Other names: Loogtarn; Tarn
- Occupations: Actress; model
- Years active: 2003–present
- Notable work: Love of Siam
- Website: Official website

Signature
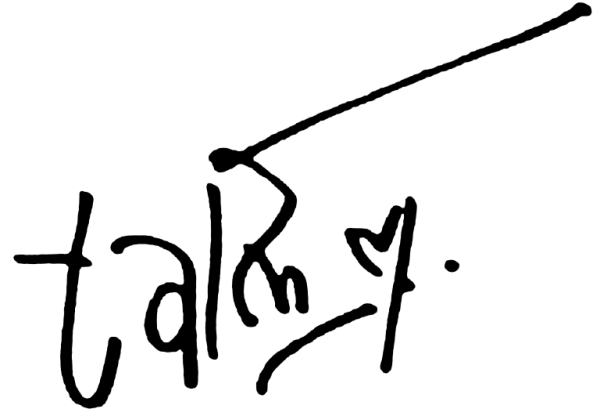

Kanya Rattanapetch (Thai: กัญญา รัตนเพชร์; RTGS: Kanya Rattanaphet, born 2 November 1989) in Thailand, is a Thai model and actress. She is best known for her role in the 2007 film, Love of Siam as Ying.

== Biography ==
Kanya Rattanapetch was born in Bangkok, Thailand. She is currently studies master's degree at Bangkok University.

== Acting career ==
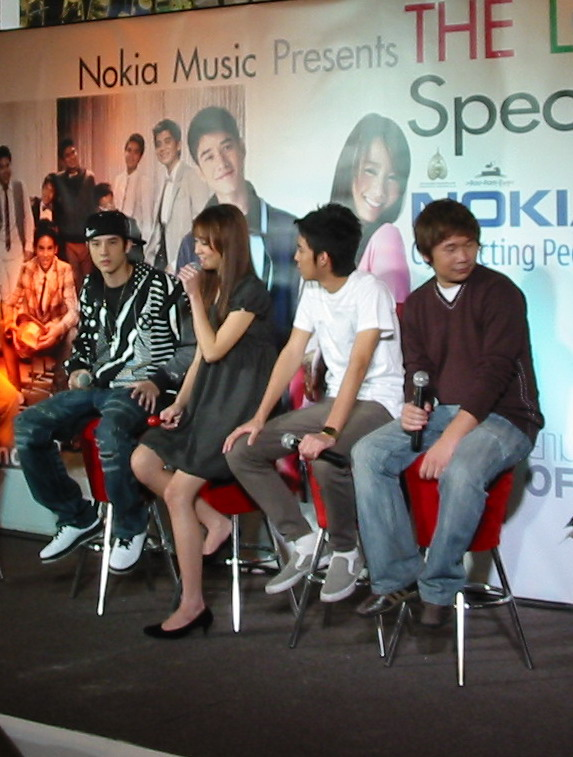
From left to right - Mario Maurer, Kanya Rattanapetch, Witwisit Hiranyawongkul and Chookiat Sakveerakul

Her acting career started when she was 13 or 14 years old, and she was seen first in 2005 Thai Horror Film Scared(Rab Nong Sayong Kwan) as Tarn. Aside from acting she was also in the field of modeling. She did two more films Mor.8 in 2006 and Sick Nurses in 2007. She rose to fame when she played the martyr girl named 'Ying' in the most acclaimed Thai film Love of Siam (Rak Haeng Sayam).

The year after she started getting supporting roles for TV Series / Lakorn from 3 major TV Station in Thailand. She was first cast in Ch.5's Sitcom Ruk Rhythm. After the sitcom she was cast at ch.3' Lakorn 'Ruk Sorn Kaen', then 2009, she got a role as Noodee in a Lakorn titled 'Mea Luang' in ch.7 (Ch.3's rival network). After that series Kanya is back at ch.3 for 'Sapai Glai Peun Tiang' which is currently airing in Thailand. She will be back in ch.7 for a Lakorn where she will play in a lead role. The tentative title of the said Lakorn is 'Coke E-Ling Hansa'.

Aside from that, after her performance in the Love of Siam, she was chosen to be WAN's leading lady for his single's music video for "Safe Distance". the song and the music video itself topped charts Thailand due to the chemistry between Kanya and Wan. It was proceeded with another music video for WAN's next single 'What the Rest'. The music video follows the story from the 1st video, yet ended in a sad end. Kanya was also featured in 2 music videos of the Thai band "AM Fine" where she acted a rocker-emo who fell in love with a guy who loves someone else.

In 2008, she made another movie titled 4 Romance alongside her fellow cast in the Love of Siam, Mario Maurer and Witwisit Hiranyawongkul. The three actors were not actually seen in a same scene because they all have their lead roles in three different segments of the film. Witwisit is in the segment 'Dream', Mario in 'Kiss' and Kanya in segment 'Shy'.

== Filmography ==
Year	Title	Role	Notes
2005	Beautiful Wonderful Perfect	Suay	
2005	Scared	Tarn	
2006	Mor.8	Petchara	
2007	Sick Nurses	Ae	
2007	Love of Siam	Ying	The Martyr
2008	4 Romance	Tong	Lead Role: Segment: Shy
2009	Pai In Love		Lead Role
2010	Who Are You?		Lead Role

== TV Series / Lakorn ==
Year	Title	Role	TV Station
2008	Ruk Rhythm	Nurse PiangOr	Ch. 5
2008	Ruk Sorn Kaen	Ploysai	Ch. 3
2009	Mea Luang	Noodee	Ch. 7
2009	Sapai Glai Peun Tiang	Nampetch	Ch. 3
TBA	Wong Wien Hua Jai		Ch. 7
TBA	Coke E-Ling Hansa		Ch. 7

== Awards and nominations ==
Year	Organization	Award	Result	Film
2008	Kom Chad Luek Award Nomination	Best Supporting Actress	Nominated	Love of Siam
2008	Thailand National Film Association Awards	Best Supporting Actress	Nominated	Love of Siam

== Other appearances ==
Kanya also did star in 2 music videos, one for the thai singer WAN and another for the Thai band AM Fine. which both was proceeded by a sequel.

Music Videos with WAN

- Safe Distance:AF2 (Wan: Soloist).
- What the Rest:AF2 (Wan: Soloist).

Music Videos for Am Fine Band

- Chan Di Mai Pho Due Thoe Mai Pho Sak Thi by Am Fine.
- Fear Night by Am Fine.

== Advertisements ==
- Heartbeat Candy
- Government Savings Bank GSB
