= Matika Arthakornsiripho =

Thai model and actress

- มาติกา อรรถกรศิริโพธิ์
- Born: 9 May 1986 (age 40); Bangkok, Thailand
- Other name: Bee (บี)
- Modeling information
- Height: 1.58 m (5 ft 2 in)
- Hair color: Black
- Eye color: Dark Brown

Matika Arthakornsiripho (Thai: มาติกา อรรถกรศิริโพธิ์; born 9 May 1986, in Bangkok, Thailand) is a Thai model and actress. Her nickname is Bee (Thai: บี). Her film roles include Nang Sib Song, Prasuton Manorah and Uttai Tawee.

At the end of 2006, Matika temporarily left the film world to participate in a photo shoot for a Thai magazine. Fans consider her one of the hottest models and actresses in Thailand. Recently she has been used in several photo shoots for Thai magazines, and she also appeared in one film, Moneah Nang Ree.

After her two most recent film releases, Nang Sib Song and Prasuton Manorah, a rumor circulated through Thailand that Matika and her co-star Sapol Chonnawee (สพล ชนวีร์) were dating. However, a TV show revealed that this film couple are truly brother and sister in reality.

== Filmography ==
Year	Title	Role
1995	Sai Lo Hid (Lineages)	young kob
2002	Nang Sib Song	Meree
2002	Prasuton Manorah	Manorah
2003	Uttai Tawee	Tawee
2003	Pi Goun Tong	Pi Goun Tong
2005	Scared	Tan
2006	Moneah Nang Ree	Nang Ree
