= Home (2012 film) =

- Film poster
- Directed by: Chookiat Sakveerakul
- Written by: Chookiat Sakveerakul; Nawapol Thamrongrattanarit
- Produced by: Somsak Techaratanaprasert
- Starring: Penpak Sirikul; Ruangsak Loychusak; Siraphan Wattanajinda; Supoj Chancharoen; Witoon Jaiprom; Puttachat Pongsuchat; Witwisit Hiranyawongkul; Jarunee Boonsake; Chutavuth Pattarakampol; Kittisak Patomburana
- Cinematography: Chukiat Narongrit
- Edited by: Chookiat Sakveerakul; Lee Chatametikool
- Music by: Thanachai Ujjin; Witwisit Hiranyawongkul; MD Sponx
- Production company: Sahamongkolfilm International
- Distributed by: Sahamongkolfilm International
- Release date: 19 April 2012 (Thailand)
- Running time: 131 minutes
- Country: Thailand
- Languages: Thai; Northern Thai
- Box office: >5.3 million baht

Home (Thai title: Home ความรัก ความสุข ความทรงจำ, RTGS: ...Khwamrak Khwamsuk Khwamsongcham, 'Home: Love, Happiness, Memories') is a Thai drama film directed by Chookiat Sakveerakul. It was produced and distributed by Sahamongkolfilm International and released in Thailand on 19 April 2012. The film, set in Chiang Mai, consists of three continuous segments, each focusing on a group of characters whose relationships are revealed in the third segment. According to Chookiat, "Unlike my previous works, Home doesn't question any social problems. It's more of a personal film that pulls together my own memories."

In the first segment, recent secondary school graduate Nae (Chutavuth Pattarakampol) is taking photographs of his school campus at night when he meets a younger student acquaintance, Beam (Kittisak Patomburana). The two talk about their experiences, relationships and plans for the future, but have to part as morning comes. The second segment tells the story of widow Buajan (Penpak Sirikul), who continues to find notes left by her late husband (Witoon Jaiprom), which keep her bonded to his memory but also prevents her from moving on. The last segment centres on the wedding of Chiang Mai native Preeya (Siraphan Wattanajinda) and Leng (Ruangsak Loychusak), a businessman from Phuket. Problems arise on the wedding day after Preeya has an encounter with her ex-boyfriend Pek (Supoj Chancharoen), although she is supported by her aunt (Puttachat Pongsuchat) and brother (Witwisit Hiranyawongkul).

Home was released on 19 April 2012, and grossed 5,346,751 baht on its opening weekend, placing it second in the Thai box office that weekend after Battleship. The film won the 22nd National Film Association Award for Best Picture, and Chookiat won the Best Director award for his direction of the film.
