= Chanidapa Pongsilpipat =

Thai actress and presenter

- ชนิดาภา พงศ์ศิลป์พิพัฒน์
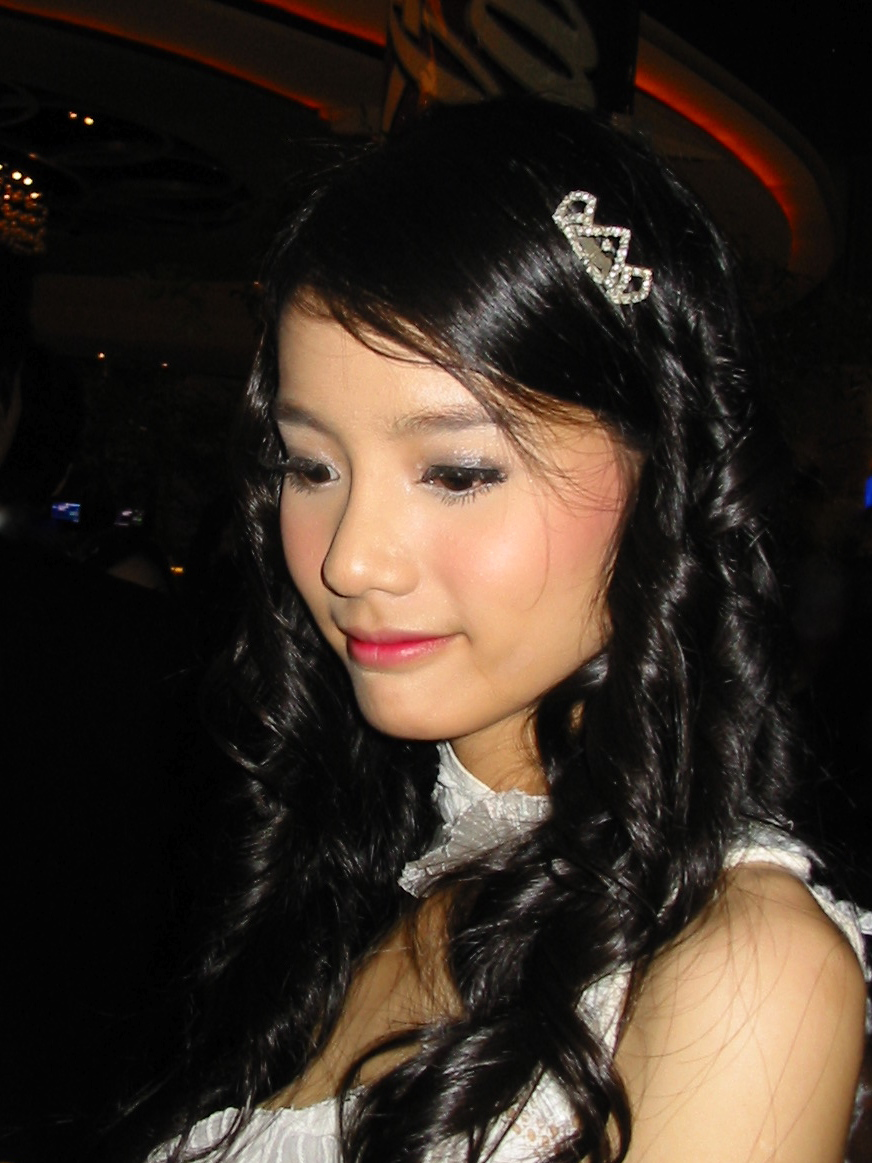
- Chanidapa at Star Entertainment Awards 2007
- Born: Aticha Pongsilpipat (อธิชา พงศ์ศิลป์พิพัฒน์); 15 July 1988 (age 37); Thailand
- Other names: Best; Xiaobu
- Occupation: Actress
- Years active: 2003–present
- Website: Official website

Signature
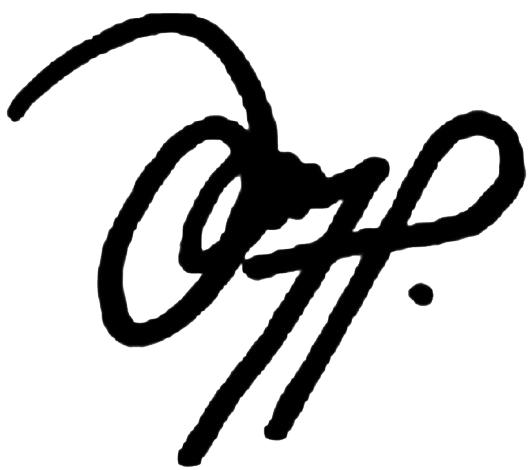

Chanidapa Pongsilpipat, (Thai: ชนิดาภา พงศ์ศิลป์พิพัฒน์; RTGS: Chanidapha Phongsinphiphat; born July 15, 1988) in Thailand, is a Thai actress and presenter. She is best known for her role in the 2007 film, The Love of Siam as Donut. She is currently signed contract actors with Channel 3 and has starred in many TV series with the TV channel since 2013. Her nickname is Best. Her other nickname known by Chinese fans is Xiaobu.

== Biography ==
Chanidapa's original name was Aticha Pongsilpipat. She entered entertainment business after winning a skin competition by Babi Mild. She then has many fashion shots with various woman and fashion magazines, TV commercials, music videos before moving to films and TV series.

In her first film, The Love of Siam (Kak Haeng Siam, รักแห่งสยาม), she appeared as one of the four main actors promoted on the film's poster. She starred as "Donut", girlfriend of "Tong", one of the two leading actors. The film won many Thailand film awards for movie showing in the year 2005.

She then signed with Exact, the television arm of GMM Grammy, during 2007—2012 and starred in several of Exact TV series (lakorn) aired on Channel 5. She changed her name to Chanidapa in this period. When the contract expired, she refused to renew contract with Exact, citing the desired to be able to freely accepting various works including advertisements and events since she had already graduated and became available 7 days a week.

She went on to become a freelance actress, starred in a Channel 9 drama Sao Noi, and Channel 3 drama Phu Dee Isan which is her first villain role. She then had comedy-villain role in her next Channel 3 drama Ruen Ritsaya. After a few TV series with Channel 3, she then signed acting contract with the channel mid-2014.

== Education ==
- Bachelor's Degree: Faculty of Fine Art, Srinakharinwirot University (Acting and Directing Major)

== Filmography ==
| Year | Title | Role | Notes |
|---|---|---|---|
| 2007 | The Love of Siam (รักแห่งสยาม) with Mario Maurer | Donut | |

== TV Series / Lakorn ==
| Year | Title | Role | TV Station |
|---|---|---|---|
| 2008 | Kwarm Lub Kaung Superstar ความลับของ Superstar | Pajaree Khanngam (B'Parn) | Ch.5 |
| 2010 | Jub Tai Wai Rai Sai Samorn จับตายวายร้ายสายสมร | lilly | Ch.5 |
| 2011 | Talad Arom ตลาดอารมณ์ | Mattanaa | Ch.5 |
| 2011 | Kohn Teun คนเถื่อน | Chaba | Ch.5 |
| 2012 | Marnya Rissaya มารยาริษยา | Faii | Ch.5 |
| 2012 | Sao Noi สาวน้อย | Kaew | Ch.9 |
| 2013 | Phu Dee Isan ผู้ดีอีสาน | Yodying | Ch.3 |
| 2014 | Cubic คิวบิก | Pailing | Ch.3 |
| 2014 | Ruen Ritsaya เรือนริษยา | Kanokkorn "Kib" | Ch.3 |
| 2014 | Malee Roeng Rabam มาลีเริงระบำ | Bussababun "Bella" | Ch.3 |
| 2015 | Bannee Phee Mai Pob บ้านนี้ผี(ไม่)ปอบ | Rarueng | Ch.3 |
| 2016 | Thanchai Kummalor ท่านชายกำมะลอ | Riza | Ch.3 |
| 2016 | Thanchai Prumruk พิรุณพร่ำรัก | Laila Lu | Ch.3 |
| 2016 | Raeng Tawan แรงตะวัน | KhaeKhai | Ch.3 |
| 2016 | Luard Ruk Torranong เลือกรักทระนง | Parichat (Poopae) | Ch.3 |
| 2016 | Saeng Tian แสงเทียน | Buaklee (Keard) | Ch.3 |
| 2017 | Funruk Funsalay ฝันรักฝันสลาย | Judy (cameo) | Ch.3 |
| 2017 | Tiang Nangmai เตียงนางไม้ | Yoghurt | Ch.3 |
| 2018 | Sapai Kafak สะใภ้กาฝาก | Marayat (May) | Ch.3 |
| 2018 | Prakasit Kammathep ประกาศิตกามเทพ | Aim | Ch.3 |
| 2019 | Dao Lhong Fah 2019 ดาวหลงฟ้า | Tibpawan (Tib) | Ch.3 |
| 2020 | Kwam Song Jum See Jang ความทรงจำสีจาง | Dao (cameo) | Ch.3 |
| 2021 | Mia Jum Pen (2021) เมียจำเป็น | Sophid (So) | Ch.3 |
| 2021 | Piphob Himmaparn พิภพหิมพานต์ | Jansuda | Ch.3 |
| 2021 | Sapai Jao Sua (2021) สะใภ้เจ้าสัว | Wanlapa Sedtakiddachakun (Wan) | Ch.3 |
| 2022 | Pom Sanaeha ปมเสน่หา | Linly | Ch.3 |
| 2022 | Ratee Luang รตีลวง | Doung Jai | Ch.3 |
| 2022 | Poot Mae Nam Khong ภูตแม่น้ำโขง | Wian-le (Lun) | Ch.3 |
| 2023 | Rak Sood Jai, Yai Tua Saeb รักสุดใจยัยตัวแสบ | Nongnat () | Ch.3 |

== Awards and nominations ==
- Milky Girl (Babi mild)
- Vita Girl (Vita)
- Miss Fresh (Ac’cess)
- Press Lover (Vivite)

== Other appearances ==
- Stage Play The Star Spangled-girl (พราวตา) Year : 2010

== Advertisements ==
Commercial

- CAMELLA
- TARO V-plus
- Magic Talker’s
- M BIKE
- TT&T

== Magazine ==
- Cleo Magazine
- Spicy Magazine
- Sweety Magazine
- Rush Magazine
- Hug Magazine
- MIX Magazine
- ISEE Magazine
