= Sick Nurses =

2007 film by Piraphan Laoyont and Thodsapol Siriwiwat

- Theatrical release poster
- Thai: สวยลากไส้
- Directed by: Piraphan Laoyont; Thodsapol Siriwiwat
- Written by: Piraphan Laoyont; Thodsapol Siriwiwat
- Produced by: Prachya Pinkaew; Sukanya Vongsthapat; Akarapol Techaratanaprasert
- Starring: Chol Wajananont
- Cinematography: Chitti Urnorakankij
- Edited by: Piraphan Laoyont; Chalerm Wongpim; Manussa Vorasingha
- Music by: Lullaby Production
- Distributed by: Sahamongkol Film International
- Release date: 14 June 2007 (Thailand)
- Running time: 83 minutes
- Country: Thailand
- Language: Thai

Sick Nurses (Thai: สวยลากไส้, romanized: Suay Laak Sai) is a 2007 Thai supernatural slasher film written and directed by Piraphan Laoyont and Thodsapol Siriwiwat.

== Plot ==
In a run-down, suburban Bangkok hospital, young Dr. Tar and seven nurses have been running a scheme to sell dead bodies on the black market. However, one nurse, Tahwaan, has found out that her boyfriend, Dr. Tar, has been having an affair with her sister, Nook. Growing tired of the body-selling scam and enraged by her sister and boyfriend's betrayal, Tahwaan threatens to call the police.

However, before Tahwaan can take action, the doctor and six resident nurses at the hospital strap Tahwaan to an operating table, kill her, and then wrap her in a black plastic garbage bag. They then dump her in the trunk of the doctor's car, where her corpse will be kept on dry ice until it can be sold.

All the women have their own obsessions and weaknesses. The spirit of Tahwaan uses these obsessions to torment and ultimately kill the other six nurses. Scenes shown toward the end of the film indicate that many of these obsessions were in part encouraged by Dr. Tar, or in some cases, used by him to seduce some of the women. For example, Aeh seems unhealthily attracted to material possession such as jewelry, dresses, and handbags. One brief scene shows Dr. Tar giving Aeh a handbag that was shown sewn to her head and neck earlier in such a manner that when Nook tries to undo the stitching, Aeh is left decapitated.

It is eventually revealed that Tahwaan was once a homosexual male, Duangwit, a former lover of Dr. Tar, who had undergone a sex change to marry Dr. Tar. She finally kills her own sister by being literally reborn through her, and as she stares at Tar, she mutters, "marry me" and the screen goes black.

== Cast ==
- Chol Wachananont as Tahwaan
- Wichan Jarujinda as Dr. Tar
- Tanapol Nimthisuk as Tuwangwit
- Chidjan Rujiphun as Nook
- Kanya Rattanapetch as Aeh
- Dollaros Dachapratumwan as Jo
- Ase Wang as Yim
- Ampairat Techapoowapat as Orn
- Ampaiwan Techapoowapat as Am

== Release and reception ==
Sick Nurses was released in Thailand cinemas on June 14, 2007, where critical and box-office response was muted and maybe due to less cinema release of 50 and runs only for 2 weeks. According to Box-officeMojo.com its total gross to date is $335,399 excluding the DVD sales worldwide.

Bangkok Post film critic Kong Rithdee characterized the film as exploitive and complained that the film's general release was allowed by the same Board of Censors that had earlier in the year banned director Apichatpong Weerasethakul's drama film, Syndromes and a Century, because of what the board said were objectionable portrayals of medical professionals. "What's more saddening than seeing bad exploitation movies is the double standards of the people who have power. Unfortunately we have both of them right here in Thailand," he wrote.

In July 2007, at a workshop discussion on censorship in Thailand, producer Prachya Pinkaew revealed that the Board of Censors had in fact called for cuts to be made in the film, asking that a scene in which a medical cross symbol falls off the hospital building and kills a character be altered to eliminate the killing, because the censors believed that was a bad association for the symbol.

The film was shown at the 2007 Hawaii International Film Festival in the "Extreme Asia" section, where it received a positive review from Variety, which called the film "slickly executed".

As of 2008, the film has been released on DVD in Thailand with no English subs and in America with English and Spanish subs and an optional English dub.

The late Brazilian Boca do Lixo director Carlos Reichenbach screened the film in one of the last sessions he used to organize, the Sessão do Comodoro, in São Paulo.

By 2018, the film was only released in Kyiv Ukraine by the title хворих медсестер or khvorykh medsester in Ukrainian transliteration.
