= What the Duck (record label) =

Thai music record label founded in 2014

- Type: Limited Company
- Founded: March 5, 2014
- Headquarters: 25/4 Soi Phahonyothin 9 Phahonyothin Road, Phaya Thai Subdistrict, Phaya Thai District , Bangkok, Thailand
- Products: Music and Entertainment
- Website: whattheduckmusic.com

What The Duck (Thai: วอท เดอะ ดัก) is a Thai record label founded in 2014, with Chichyasu Kransut serving as Executive Director, Samkwan Tansompong as Managing Director, and Torpong Janthubpha as Artist Director, overseeing artist selection and development.

== Background ==
The origins of the label trace back to when Samkwan Tansompong and Torpong Janthubpha were friends during their studies at Silpakorn University. Torpong later became an artist under the band Scrubb, while Samkwan worked in the music industry. Eventually, they met Chichyasu Kransut and decided to join forces to establish a record label, with Singto Numchok as one of the label's initial artists.

The artists who brought recognition to the label included Chati Suchart with the song "การเดินทาง" ("The Journey"). This was followed by artists like The Toys, and Bowkylion. Subsequently, sub-labels emerged, such as WHOOP, managed by The Toys, and Moonflower, co-managed by BOWKYLION and Chayapanya Chantranuson. Another initiative, MILK!, was described by the label as a platform to support emerging indie artists, though no contracts were signed.

In its early years, the label also worked with artists such as Loserpop, Quicksand Bed, and Varis. In later periods, it expanded its roster to include Aimzillow, minekuk, H I N A N O, Gencry, Fluffypak, mute, and PURPEECH.

== Artists ==
=== What The Duck ===
- The Toys
- Bowkylion
- Whal & Dolph
- Musketeers
- Chati Suchart
- Valentina Ploy
- Pae Arak
- Pangko
- Plastic Plastic
- Mints
- De Flamingo
- Lan Dok Mai

=== Whoop ===
- YourMOOD
- Marc Tatchapon
- WANWANWAN
- VVV
