= Love of Siam =

- Theatrical release poster
- Directed by: Chookiat Sakveerakul
- Written by: Chookiat Sakveerakul
- Produced by: Prachya Pinkaew; Sukanya Vongsthapat
- Starring: Sinjai Plengpanich; Songsit Roongnophakunsri; Chermarn Boonyasak; Mario Maurer; Witwisit Hiranyawongkul; Kanya Rattanapetch; Chanidapa Pongsilpipat
- Cinematography: Chitti Urnorakankij
- Edited by: Lee Chatametikool; Chookiat Sakveerakul
- Music by: Kitti Kuremanee
- Production company: Baa-Ram-Ewe
- Distributed by: Sahamongkol Film International
- Release date: November 22, 2007
- Running time: 150 minutes 170 minutes (Director's Cut); 186 minutes (Full Length Version)
- Country: Thailand
- Language: Thai
- Budget: ฿17,000,000
- Box office: ฿44,959,100 ($1,405,711)

Love of Siam (Thai: รักแห่งสยาม, RTGS: Rak Haeng Sayam, pronounced [rák hɛ̀ŋ sà.jǎːm]) is a 2007 Thai multi-layered romantic-drama film written and directed by Chookiat Sakveerakul. The film tells a story of love, friendship and family. The film was released in Thailand on November 22, 2007. The fact that the gay romance storyline was not apparent from the film's promotional material initially caused controversy, but the film was received with critical acclaim and proved financially successful. It dominated Thailand's 2007 film awards season, winning the Best Picture category in all major events.

== Plot ==
Ten-year-old Mew and Tong are neighbors. Tong wants to befriend Mew, his outgoing neighbour, but initially Mew acts cold towards him. At school, effeminate Mew is teased by several other students until Tong steps in to defend him. Tong is injured, but Mew is appreciative and they finally become friends. Mew plays on his late grandpa's piano and is joined by his grandma, who begins to play an old Chinese song. She explains that one day, Mew will understand the meaning of the song. Tong's family goes on vacation to Chiang Mai and his older sister, Tang, begs her mother to allow her to remain with friends several days longer. Tong buys Mew a present, deciding to give it to Mew piece by piece in a game similar to a treasure hunt. One by one, Mew finds all of the pieces except for the last one which is hidden in a tree that is cut down just as Mew is about to retrieve it. Tong is disappointed at their misfortune, but Mew remains grateful for Tong's efforts and gift.

Tong's parents are unable to contact Tang in Chiang Mai, and go there to look for her. Tong, devastated that his sister is missing, cries and Mew tries to comfort him. Tong's parents are unable to find Tang, and believing she is dead, the family decides to move to Bangkok. Six years later, Tong's father Korn is a severe alcoholic, due to his guilt for losing his daughter. Tong has a pretty—but uptight—girlfriend, Donut. Tong and Mew are reunited during their senior year of high school at Siam Square. The musically talented Mew is the lead singer of a boy band called August. The meeting stirs up old feelings that Mew has harbored since boyhood. The manager of Mew's band, Aod, says they must write a song about love in order to sell more records. He assigns them a new assistant manager, June, who coincidentally looks identical to Tong's missing sister. When Tong eventually meets her, he and his mother, Sunee, devise to a plan to hire June to pretend she is Tang, in hopes that it will pull Korn out of his alcoholic depression. Mew is also the object of an unrequited crush from a neighbour girl, Ying, but he is more interested in his boyhood friend Tong, who has become his inspiration for writing the new love song.

As part of the deception with "Tang", a backyard party is held in honor of her return, and Mew's band provides the entertainment. Singing the new love song for the first time in public, Mew's eyes lock intensely with Tong's. After the party, the two boys share a prolonged kiss. Unseen, Sunee accidentally witnesses their kiss. The next day, she firmly commands Mew to stay away from her son. Mew is heartbroken and loses his musical inspiration, so he quits the band. Korn's alcoholism leads to a liver condition which sends him to a hospital. June questions the effectiveness of the "Tang" ruse, noting that Korn has not reduced his alcohol consumption and she leaves. After she leaves, Korn starts eating more and begins taking his liver medication.

At Christmas time, as Tong and his mother are decorating their Christmas tree, she accepts his sexuality by allowing him to choose a male ornament over a female one. Tong goes to Siam Square for a date with Donut. Mew has rejoined the band, and they are playing nearby. Tong abandons Donut and rushes to see Mew sing and is guided there by Ying, who has accepted the fact that Mew loves Tong. After the performance, Tong gives Mew his Christmas gift, the missing nose from the wooden doll that Tong gave him when they were children. Tong then tells Mew, "I can't be your boyfriend, but that doesn't mean I don't love you."

== Cast ==
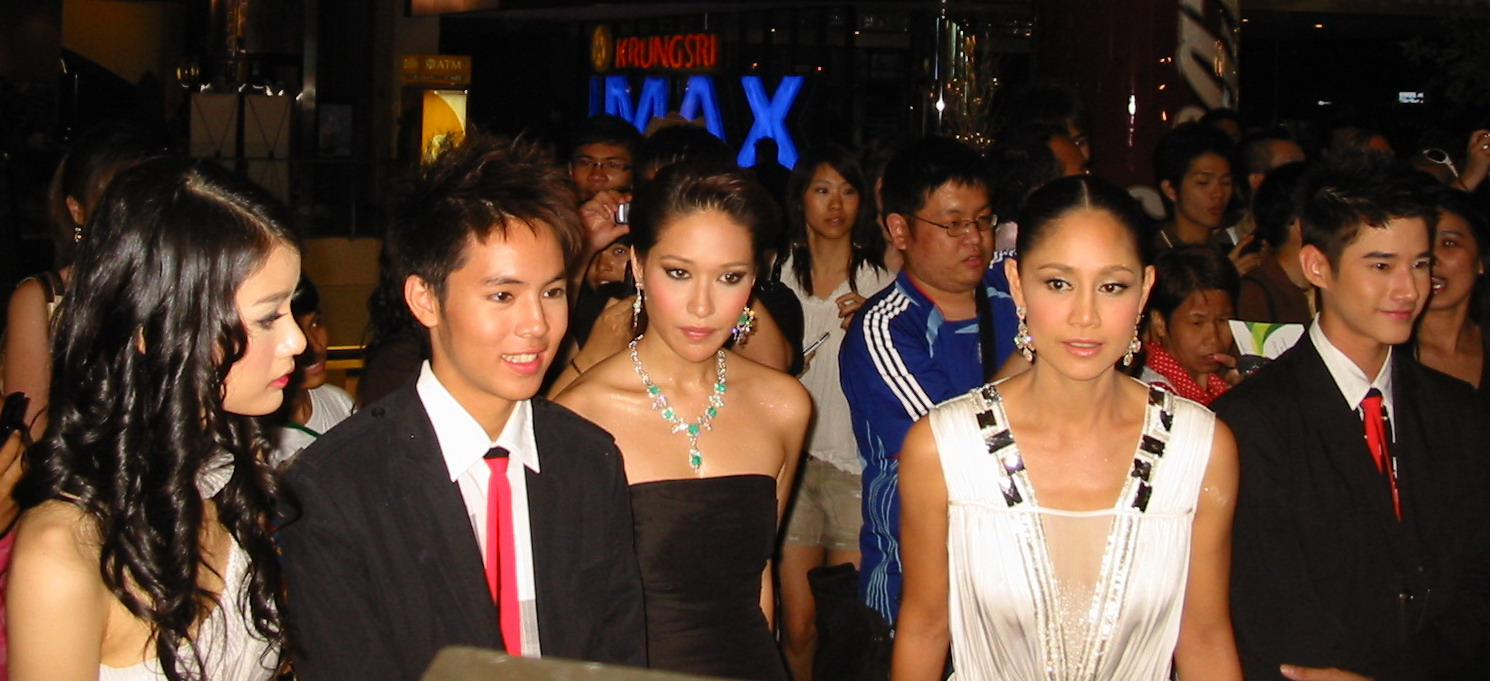
from L-R :Aticha Pongsilpipat, Witwisit Hiranyawongkul, Chermarn Boonyasak, Sinjai Plengpanich and Mario Maurer

- Sinjai Plengpanich as Sunee
- Songsit Roongnophakunsri as Korn
- Chermarn Boonyasak as Tang/June
- Pimpan Buranapim as Grandmother
- Mario Maurer as Tong
  - Jirayu La-ongmanee as Tong (young)
- Witwisit Hiranyawongkul as Mew
  - Artit Niyomkul as Mew (young)
- Kanya Rattanapetch as Ying
- Chanidapa Pongsilpipat (Aticha Pongsilpipat) as Donut

== Reception ==
=== Marketing controversy and audience response ===
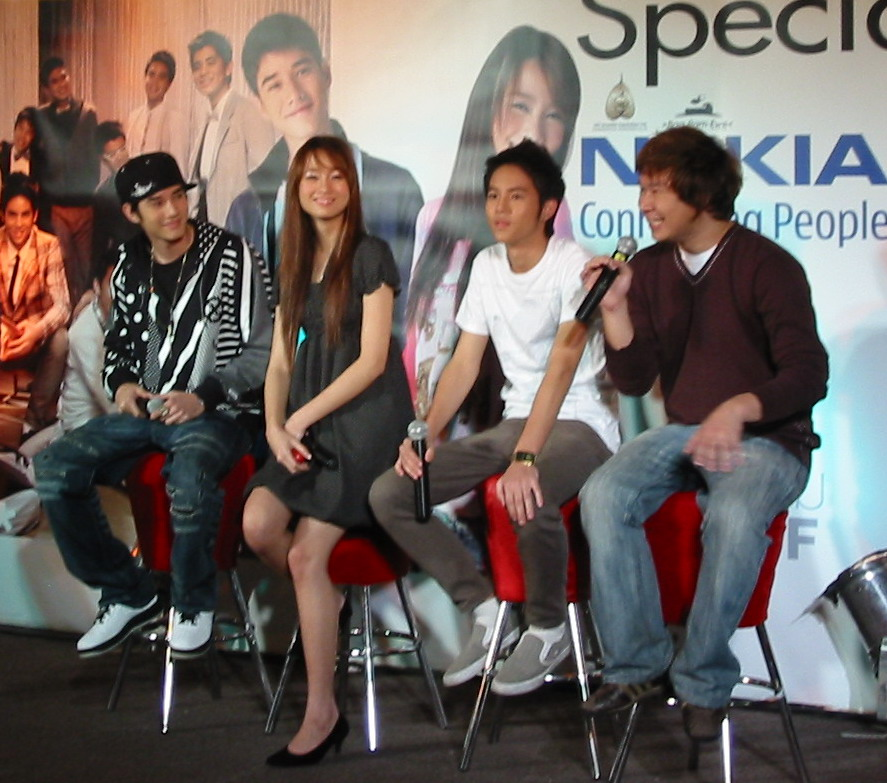
From left to right - Mario Maurer, Kanya Rattanapetch, Witwisit Hiranyawongkul and Chookiat Sakveerakul.

Marketed as a typical teen romance between boys and girls, the gay aspect of the love story was controversial. Thai-language web boards were posted with messages of support, as well as accusations by moviegoers that they were misled into watching "a gay movie." Writer/director Chookiat Sakveerakul admitted the film was marketed on the film posters and in the film's previews as a straight romance because he wanted it to reach a wider audience.

"The movie is not all about gay characters, we are not focusing on gay issues, we are not saying, 'let's come out of the closet,' so obviously, we don't want the movie to have a 'gay' label," he said in an interview. But the director confirmed the mixed reaction of audiences. "I went incognito to a movie theater and observed the audience. I didn't expect such a strong reaction. Maybe I was just too optimistic that homophobia in Thai society had subsided."

=== Commercial performance ===
Love of Siam was released in Thai cinemas on November 22, 2007, opening on 146 screens. It was the No. 1 film at the Thai box office that weekend, topping the previous No. 1 film, Beowulf. It slipped to No. 2 the following weekend, unseated by the comedy film, Ponglang Amazing Theater. In the third week of release, it had dropped to No. 5, with to-date box office takings of US$1,198,637. It has grossed a total of US$1,305,125 to date.

The film was officially released in Taiwan on September 19, 2008, Japan on May 20, 2009, and in Singapore on July 16, 2009. It reached No. 12 at the Taiwan box office in opening week.

=== Critical response ===
Love of Siam was received with critical acclaim upon its release. Bangkok Post film critic Kong Rithdee called the film "groundbreaking", in terms of being the first Thai film "to discuss teenagers' sexuality with frankness". He praised the mature, realistic family drama aspects of the film, as well as the solid performances, particularly by Sinjai Plengpanich as the mother Sunee.

Another Bangkok Post commentator, Nattakorn Devakula, said the film contained important lessons for Thai society. "The point that the film attempts to teach viewers – and a largely conservative Thai society – is that love is an evolved form of emotional attachment that transcends sexual attraction of the physical form." A reviewer for The Nation called the film "brilliantly conceived".

A few critics found fault with the film, among them Gregoire Glachant of BK magazine, who commented that "The Love of Siam isn't a very well shot movie. Chookiat's camera only records his dull play with equally dull angles and light as it wanders from homes to schools, to recording studio, and to Siam Square without sense of purpose or directions."

=== Accolades ===
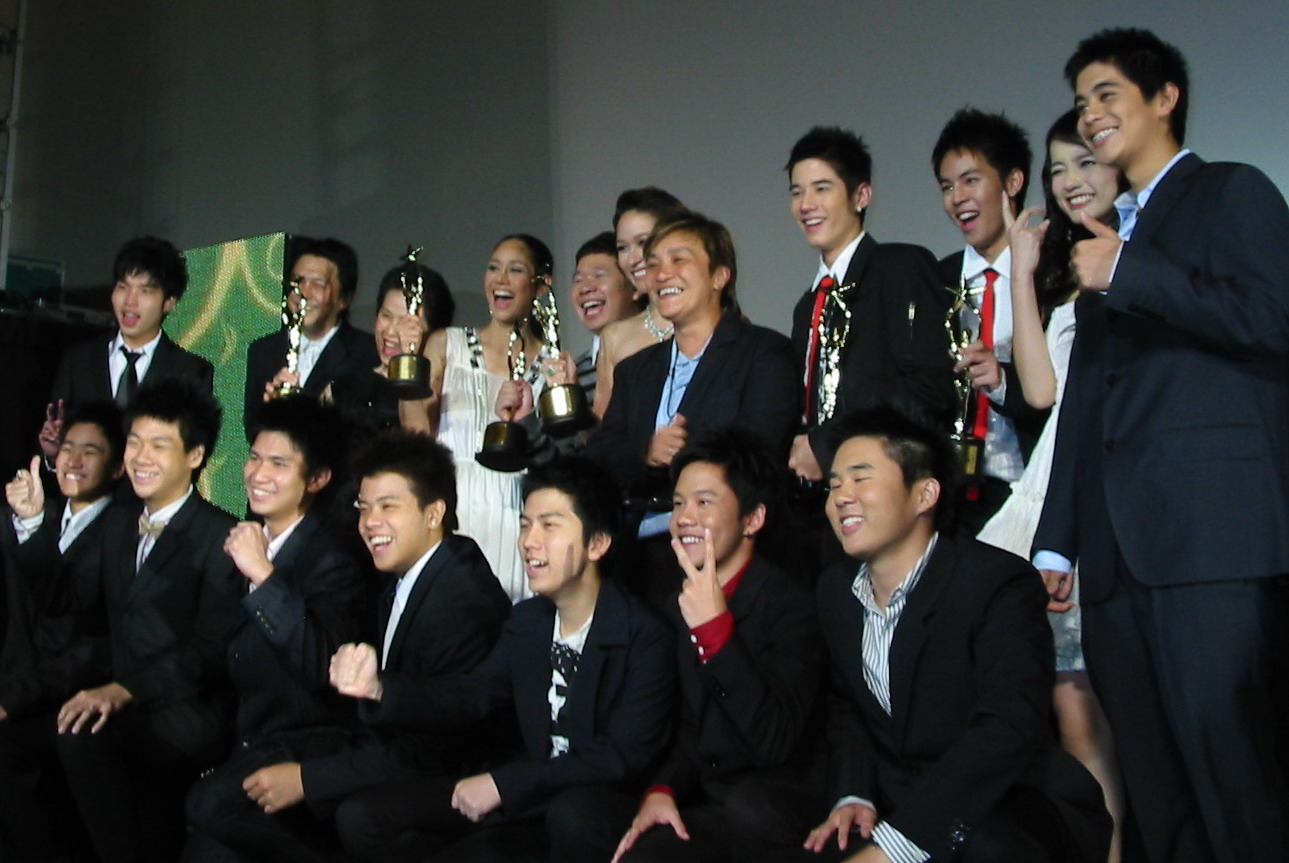
at Star Entertainment Awards 2007

Love of Siam dominated Thailand's 2007 film awards season, winning the Best Picture category in all major national film award events, including the Thailand National Film Association Awards, Starpics Magazine's Starpics Awards, the Bangkok Critics Assembly Awards, Star Entertainment Awards, and Kom Chad Luek Newspaper's Kom Chad Luek Awards. Awards won by the film include the following:

Starpics Awards
- Best Picture
- Best Director (Chookiat Sakveerakul)
- Best Actor (Mario Maurer)
- Best Actress (Sinjai Plengpanich)
- Best Supporting Actor (Songsit Rungnopakunsri)
- Best Screenplay (Chookiat Sakveerakul)
- Best Cinematography (Chitti Urnorakankij)
- Best Original Score (Kitti Kuremanee)
- Popular Film.

Kom Chad Luek Awards

- Best Picture
- Best Actress (Sinjai Plengpanich)

Thailand National Film Association Awards

- Best Picture
- Best Director (Chookiat Sakveerakul)
- Best Supporting Actress (Chermarn Boonyasak)
Bangkok Critics Assembly Awards
- Best Picture
- Best Director (Chookiat Sakveerakul)
- Best Actress (Sinjai Plengpanich)
- Best Supporting Actress (Chermarn Boonyasak)
- Best Screenplay (Chookiat Sakveerakul)
- Best Original Score (Kitti Kuremanee)

Star Entertainment Awards

- Best Picture
- Best Director (Chookiat Sakveerakul)
- Best Actress (Sinjai Plengpanich)
- Best Supporting Actress (Chermarn Boonyasak)
- Best Screenplay (Chookiat Sakveerakul)
- Best Original Song

Osaka Asian Film Festival 2009

- Audience Award

The film was also nominated for Best Supporting Actor (Mario Maurer) and Best Composer (Kitti Kuremanee) categories in the Asian Film Awards at the Hong Kong International Film Festival, but did not win.

In October 2008, Mario Maurer won the Best Actor award in Southeast Asian film category at the 10th Cinemanila International Film Festival.

Love of Siam was Thailand's submission to the 81st Academy Awards.

== Production ==
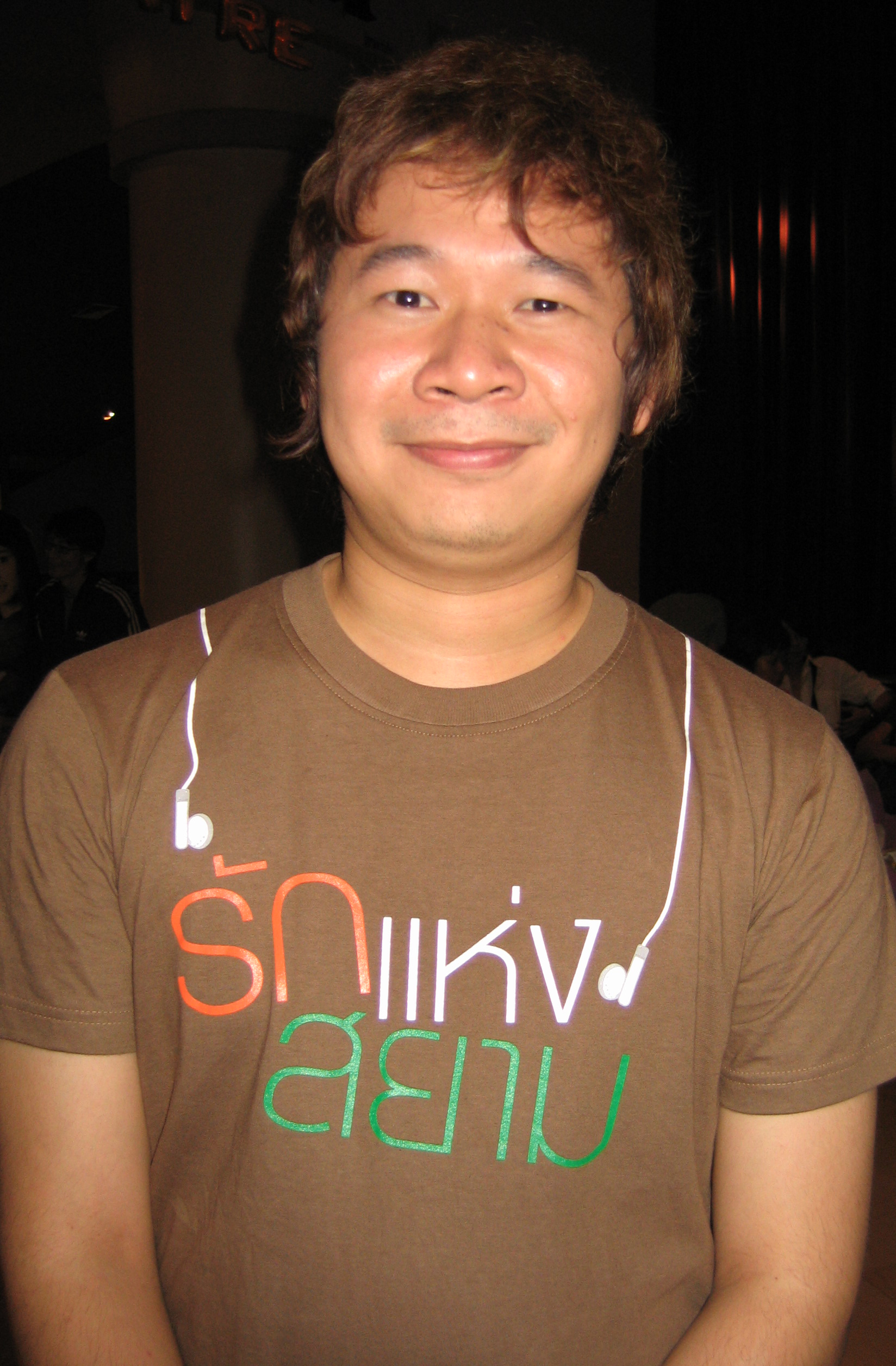
Chookiat Sakveerakul at the Thai press preview of Love of Siam on November 21, 2007.

The film was first shot on December 26, 2006, taking advantage of the Christmas lights and decorations of Siam Square and the surrounding area.

Love of Siam is unusual among Thai films in many respects. First, at 150 minutes, the film is markedly longer than most other Thai films, and second it is a drama film, which is rare in the Thai industry, which mainly produces horror, comedy, action, and (heterosexual) teen romance films. Director Sakveerakul said he felt the longer running time was needed to more fully develop all the characters and the story. He received full backing for this decision from producer Prachya Pinkaew and the production company, Sahamongkol Film International. "They liked the first cut, which was even longer, so I didn't need to convince them that much. I feel that every minute of the movie is important, and I'm glad the audience will be able to see it in full," Chookiat said in an interview before the film's release. A nearly three-hour "director's cut" was released in January 2008 exclusively at the House RCA cinema, and it played for several weeks of sold-out shows.

The film was a departure for Chookiat, who had previously directed the horror film, Pisaj and the psychological thriller, 13 Beloved.

The gay romance was also unusual, in that it involved two "straight acting" boys. In most Thai films with gay characters, gay men are coarsely depicted as trans women or transvestites with exaggerated effeminacy.

The young actors portraying Mew and Tong both had difficulties with the kissing scene. Mario Maurer, who portrayed Tong, was nervous about the role. "I've never kissed a man and kissing is not something you do every day," he said in an interview. "My father said it was just a job and not to think about it too much."

Witwisit Hiranyawongkul, who portrays Mew, accepted the role because it was challenging and because he was interested in working with the director, who was a senior classmate at Montfort College in Chiang Mai.

== Soundtrack ==
Love of Siam Original Soundtrack

Soundtrack album by Various Artists
- Released: November 12, 2007
- Genres: Thai rock Thai pop
- Length: 45:20
- Label: Sahamongkol Film International
- Producer: Chookiat Sakveerakul

Singles from Love of Siam Original Soundtrack
- 1. "Gun Lae Gun" Released: November 9, 2007; 2. "Pieng ter" Released: November 30, 2007

An original soundtrack album was released on November 12, 2007, ahead of the film's release. The two-disc package features a CD with music tracks by Chookiat Sakveerakul, Witwisit Hiranyawongkul, the August band, Passakorn Wiroonsup and Flure, and a VCD. The album proved popular, and had sold out of many shops in the weeks after its release. "Gun Lae Gun" spent seven weeks at number one on Seed 97.5 FM's charts.

Tagline: "Just ask yourself who you think of when you are listening to love song."

Disc 1 (CD)

1. "Gun lae gun" ("กันและกัน") – performed by Suweera Boonrod (Flure) – 4:34
2. "Ticket (Day Trip)" – performed by Chookiat Sakveerakul & August Band – 3:34
3. "Roo suek barng mhai" ("รู้สึกบ้างไหม") (Live) – performed by Witwisit Hiranyawongkul – 4:16
4. "Pieng ter" ("เพียงเธอ") – performed by Witwisit Hiranyawongkul – 4:12
5. "Gun lae gun" ("กันและกัน") (Acoustic version) – performed by Chookiat Sakveerakul – 6:20
6. "Kuen aun pen niran" ("คืนอันเป็นนิรันดร์") – performed by Passakorn Wiroonsup – 3:07
7. "Gun lae gun" ("กันและกัน") (Live) – performed by Witwisit Hiranyawongkul – 6:02
8. "Roo suek barng mhai" ("รู้สึกบ้างไหม ") (Original Mix) – performed by Witwisit Hiranyawongkul – 5:00
9. "Pieng ter" ("เพียงเธอ") (Demo) – performed by Chookiat Sakveerakul – 4:23
10. "Ticket (Night Trip)" (Bonus Track) – Instrumental – 3:50

Disc 2 (VCD)

1. Love of Siam trailer
2. "Gun lae gun" music video
3. Introducing the August band
4. "Gun lae gun" behind-the-scenes music video

== Home media ==
The standard DVD was released on February 19, 2008, in anamorphic widescreen format with Thai Dolby Digital 5.1 and Dolby 2.0 Surround audio tracks and a commentary by the director. The DVD includes music videos, trailer and a photo gallery.

The three-disc director's cut DVD was released on April 9, 2008. Discs 1 and 2 contain the 173 minutes director's cut of the film. Disc 3 includes a trailer, a film documentary, deleted scenes, a "Making Of", character introductions, a live concert, an interview with the songwriter and the complete theatrical version with an on-screen commentary by the director.

In addition, an audio CD, a wooden doll, postcards, the letter and a note of Gun lae gun are featured in a limited DVD Boxset.

Love of Siam was released as a Collector's Edition 3-disc set in Taiwan on January 21, 2009. This edition duplicates the Thai three-disc director's cut DVD and adds an exclusive extra of the director's and stars' reception in Taiwan. This is the only DVD of the director's cut that has English subtitles on both the film and the extras, except the Making Of which doesn't have any subtitles.

All Thailand editions mentioned above are now out of print. A budget-price one disc version was released in 2009, accompanied by a two disc version of the director's cut.

Love of Siam (theatrical version) was released in the US on October 13, 2009. The only extra is the trailer. This is the only DVD of the theatrical version that has English subtitles.

== Adaptation ==
On November 26, 2024, it was announced that Love of Siam will be adapted into a stage play under the name The Love of Siam: The Musical, which is a collaboration between Chookiat's Studio Commuan and GMMTV. In November 2025, GMMTV announced that Norawit Titicharoenrak (Gemini) and Nattawat Jirochtikul (Fourth) would play the lead roles of Tong and Mew.

== See also ==
- List of lesbian, gay, bisexual, or transgender-related films by storyline
