= Witwisit Hiranyawongkul =

Thai actor and singer

- วิชญ์วิสิฐ หิรัญวงษ์กุล
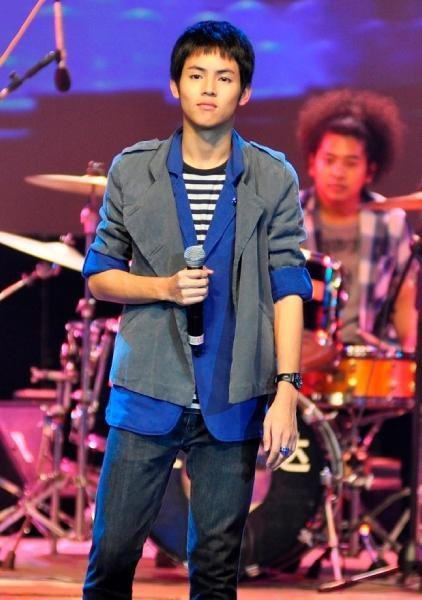
- Witwisit Hiranyawongkul in 2010.
- Born: Phit Pho-khantha (พิชญ์ โพธิ์คัณธา); 20 July 1989 (age 37); Chiang Mai, Thailand
- Other name: Pchy
- Education: Thammasat University
- Occupations: Actor; singer
- Years active: 2004–present
- Height: 1.74 m (5 ft 9 in)
- Musical career
- Genres: Thai Pop
- Instruments: Vocals; piano; guitar

Witwisit Hiranyawongkul (Thai: วิชญ์วิสิฐ หิรัญวงษ์กุล, RTGS: Witwisit Hiranyawongkun; born 20 July 1989), popularly nicknamed "Pchy" (Thai: พิช, (also written "Pitch" or "Phit"), is a Thai actor and singer. He is best known for his first leading role as Mew in the 2007 hit film Love of Siam, which won several newcomer awards and propelled him to fame in Thailand and throughout Asia.

== Early life and education ==
Witwisit Hiranyawongkul was born and raised in Chiang Mai, Thailand. He attended Montfort College in Chiang Mai. He was admitted to the Faculty of Journalism and Mass Communications, Thammasat University, Bangkok. He started his first year in 2007 and graduated in 2011.

== Career ==
=== Beginnings ===
Pchy entered the Thai entertainment business at the age of 17 while he was still in grade 12. He was discovered in his hometown by Chukiat Sakweerakul, writer and director of Love of Siam. Chukiat is an alumnus of Montfort College and met Pchy because of their common music interests.

=== 2007–2008: Acting debut and rising popularity ===
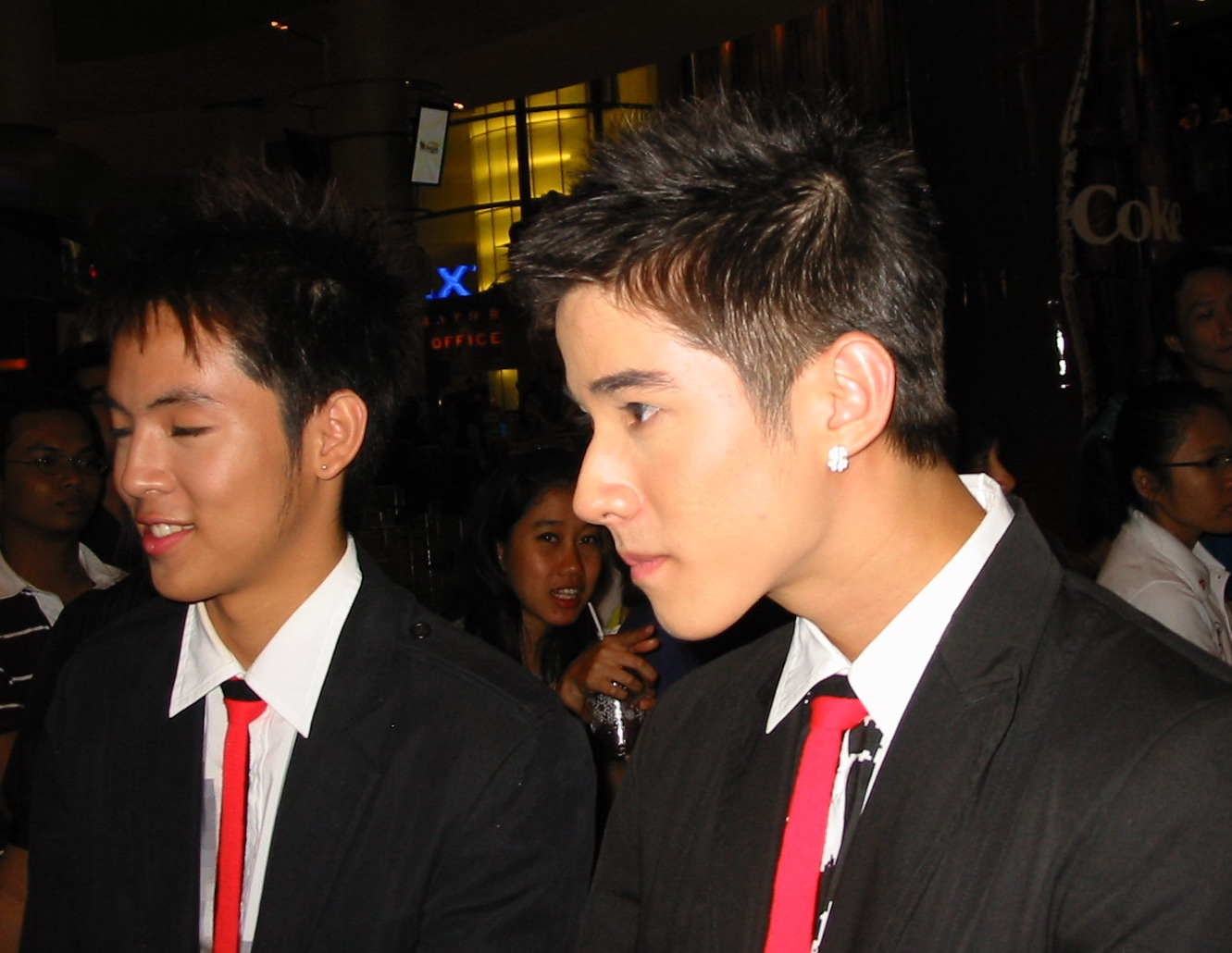
Mario Maurer and Witwisit Hiranyawongkul

Pchy make acting debut with a leading role as Mew in the 2007 Thai multi-layered romantic-drama film Love of Siam, which brought him wider recognition and several newcomer awards.

In 2008, Pchy was nominated in the Best Actor category in the Thailand National Film Association Awards for his breakthrough role in Love of Siam. He was the youngest nominee in the category. Although he eventually lost to Akara Amarttayakul, he was happy to be nominated. He was also nominated in the Best Actor category in the Critics Assembly Award. Pchy received Chalermthai award in the Lead Actor in Thai Film Category.

In the same year, Pchy appeared in Thai R&B singer Nasnan's music video "Hak Tur Mod Rak" (If You Have Lost Your Love), as the singer's love interest. In the video, Pchy plays Nasnan's boyfriend whose love starts to wane and who becomes involved with another girl. Dove invited Pchy and Chukiat Sakweerakul to compose and sing a song titled "Chao Wan Mai" (Better Morning). The CD, which is not for sale, will be given to women throughout Bangkok.

=== 2008–2014: Launched a band and activities ===
Pchy launched a band August, the boy band was made for the movie Love of Siam but, they found themselves comfortable with each other so decided to pursue it into the Thai Entertainment Industry and which began by singing and playing in Love of Siam's promotional events. The 13-member band (including Pchy) released their first album August*Thanx in February 2008. Their first full album Radiodrome was released in December 2008. On 10 January, Pchy recorded "Miss", the interlude in film Love on That Day.

Pchy's his first public work was singing the original soundtrack song for the movie Khao Niew Moo Ping. In Love of Siam soundtrack, he also contributed several songs.

== Awards and nominations ==
=== Acting ===
Year	Organisation	Award	Result	Film
2008	Suphannahong National Film Awards	Best Performance by an Actor in a Leading Role	Nominated	Love of Siam
2008	Chalermthai Awards	Lead Actor in a Thai Film	Won	Love of Siam
2008	Bangkok Critics Assembly Award	Best Actor	Nominated	Love of Siam

=== Music ===
August Band won Popular New Artist Award at Channel V Music Video Awards 2009.

- Bite of Love OST
- Love of Siam OST
- August, thanx
- Chao Wan Mai (Better Morning) Dove Campaign
- Sunshine (Single, September 2008)
- August, Radiodrome (December 2008)
- August, SUMMER (2011)
- August, Light in the Dark Volume 1: The Traveler (Single, 2011)

== Filmography ==
- Love of Siam (2007)
- Dopamine (Short movie, 2008)
- 4 Romance (2008)
- Sai Sueb Delivery (TV series on Channel 3, February–March 2009)
- Old Pals (2011)
- Home (2012)
- Grean Fictions (2013)
- Club Friday The Series 5 (TV Series on GMM CHANNEL, 2015)

== Commercial ==
- Mama (Instant noodle brand) commercial with August Band (2008)
- 1-2-Free (mobile carrier) commercial (2008)
