= Chookiat Sakveerakul =

Thai film director and screenwriter

- ชูเกียรติ ศักดิ์วีระกุล
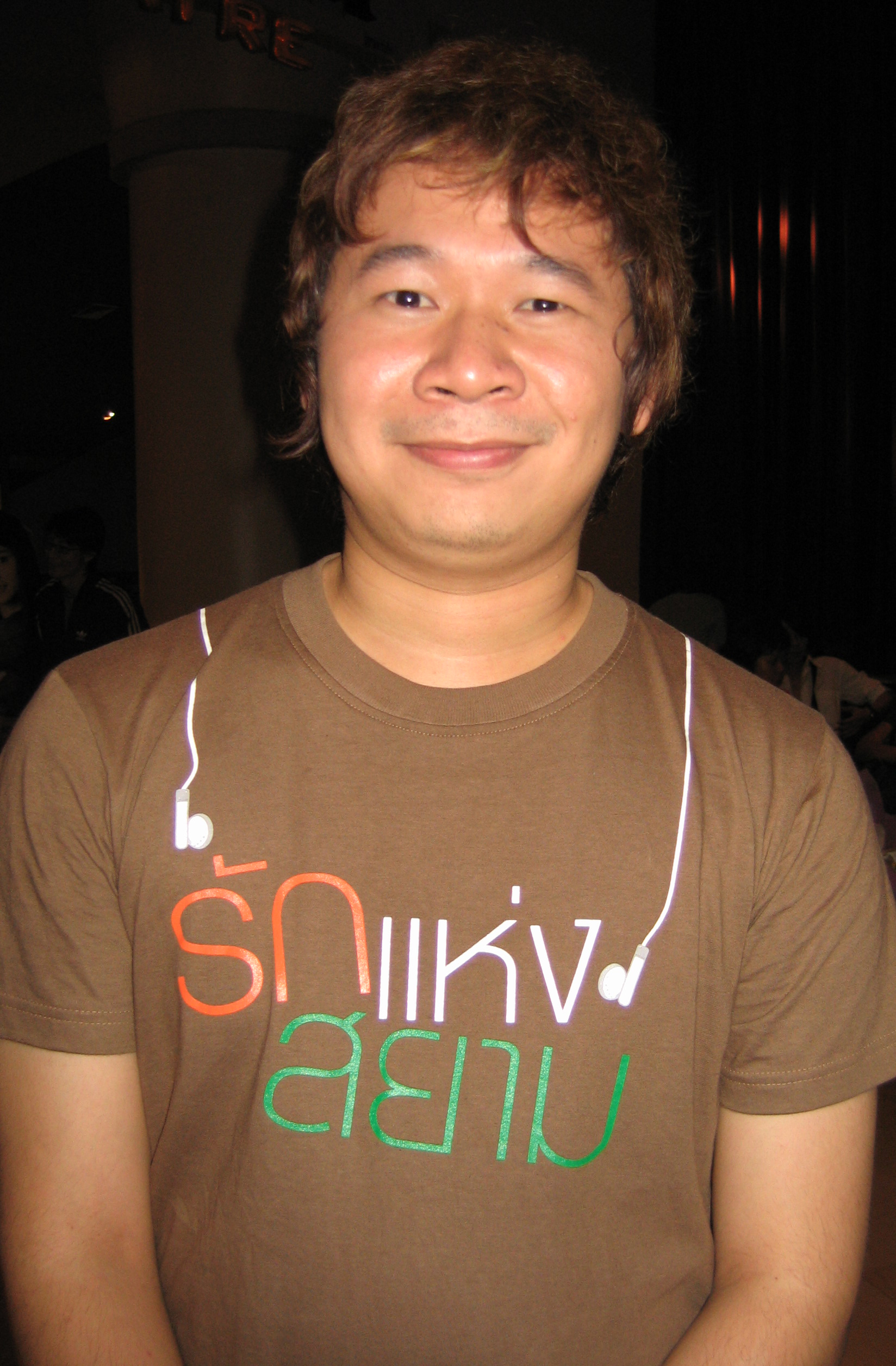
- Chookiat at the premiere of The Love of Siam in November 2007
- Born: March 15, 1981; Chiang Mai, Thailand
- Other names: Ma-Deaw; Matthew
- Occupations: Film director; screenwriter
- Notable work: Love of Siam; 13 Beloved; Pisaj

Chookiat Sakveerakul (Thai: ชูเกียรติ ศักดิ์วีระกุล, RTGS: Chukiat Sakwirakun), born 1981 in Chiang Mai, Thailand) is a Thai film director and screenwriter. He is also credited as Ma-Deaw Chukiatsakwirakul or Matthew Chukiat Sakwirakul.

Chookiat's first feature-length film was an ensemble drama, The Passenger of Li, which was an independent production. His next film Pisaj, a 2004 horror film, was produced by Sahamongkol Film International. Chookiat garnered critical acclaim for this next film, 13 Beloved, a gritty drama about a deadly underground reality-television game, which won several awards in Thailand and at film festivals. Following the success of 13 Beloved, Chookiat wrote and directed the 2007 ensemble drama The Love of Siam. The film, which explores complex themes of family dynamics and adolescent identity, is widely considered a groundbreaking work in Thai cinema for its candid and nuanced portrayal of sexuality. It dominated the 2007 Thai film awards season, winning the Best Picture category at all major national ceremonies, including the Thailand National Film Association Awards and the Bangkok Critics Assembly Awards. Chookiat’s screenplay and direction were specifically recognized with multiple honors, including Best Director and Best Screenplay awards from both the Starpics Awards and the Bangkok Critics Assembly.

He graduated from Montfort College in Chiang Mai.

== Filmography ==
=== Screenwriter ===
- Body (Co-writer with Paween Purikitpanya) (2007)
- Chocolate (Co-writer with Nepalee Sakveerakul) (2008)
- Gossip Girl: Thailand (2015)
- Slam Dance (2017)
- Inhuman Kiss (2019)
- The Fabric (2022)

=== Director ===
- Love of Siam (2007)
- 4 Romance (Segment "Dream/Fun" ) (2008)

=== Writer and director ===
- The Passenger of Li
- Pisaj (Evil) (2004)
- 13 Beloved (2006)
- The Love of Siam (2007)
- Home: Love, Happiness, Remembrance (2012)
- Grean Fictions (2013)
- The Eyes Diary (2014)
- Dew, Let's Go Together (2019)
- Triage (2022)
- Mondo (2023)
- Taklee Genesis (2024)
- Club Friday Hot Love Issue: Domestic Incident (2024)
