= Tetsuo Gotō =

Japanese actor and voice actor

- 後藤 哲夫
- Born: August 10, 1950; Gifu Prefecture, Japan
- Died: November 6, 2018 (aged 68)
- Occupations: Actor; voice actor
- Years active: 1975–2018
- Height: 166 cm (5 ft 5 in)

Tetsuo Gotō (後藤 哲夫, Gotō Tetsuo; August 10, 1950 – November 6, 2018) was a Japanese actor and voice actor from Gifu Prefecture. Gotō died on November 6, 2018, from esophageal cancer.

== Filmography ==
=== Television animation ===
- Master Keaton (1998) (Edward Langley (episode 6))
- Cyborg 009 (2001) (Sukea)
- Saikano (2002) (Kanbu)
- Planetes (2003) (Arvind "Robbie" Lavie)
- Gallery Fake (2005) (High priest)
- Kage Kara Mamoru! (2006) (Jin Pan Jii)
- Angel Heart (2006) (Chan)
- Naruto (2006) (Kanna (episode 197))
- Ōban Star-Racers (2006) (Lord Furter)
- Death Note (2006) (Deridovely)
- Zero no Tsukaima (2006) (Derflingher, Scarron)
- Ancient Ruler Dinosaur King DKidz Adventure (2007) (Dr. Sonoida)
- One Piece (2009) (Hannyabal, Saint Mjosgard, Lao G)
- Nura: Rise of the Yokai Clan (2010) (Gangi Kozō)
- Shinryaku! Ika Musume (2010) (Martin)
- Shinryaku!? Ika Musume (2011) (Martin)
- Hunter × Hunter (2013) (Bizeff)
- Dragon Ball Super (2016) (Gowasu)
- Princess Principal (2017) (Horikawa Kou (episode 4–5))
- Layton Mystery Tanteisha: Katori no Nazotoki File (2018) (Mustafa Fullhold) (first voice)

=== Film ===
- Blue Exorcist: The Movie (2012) (Hearing Officer)
- Ghost in the Shell: Arise (2013) (Kasuga)

=== Video games ===
Year	Title	Role	Console	Notes	Source
1998	Panzer Dragoon Saga	Old Ponta	Sega Saturn		
2001	Jak and Daxter: The Precursor Legacy	Boggy Billy	PlayStation 2, PlayStation 3, PlayStation Vita, PlayStation 4	Japanese dub	
2002	Ratchet & Clank	Supreme Executive Chairman Drek	PlayStation 2	Japanese dub	
2004	Crash Nitro Kart	Norm	Game Boy Advance, GameCube, PlayStation 2, Xbox, N-Gage, mobile phone	Japanese dub	
2005	Sakura Wars: So Long, My Love	Wong Xingzhi	PlayStation 2, Wii		
2005	Rogue Galaxy	Doctor Izel, Ugozi Lo Burkaqua	PlayStation 2		
2007	Dinosaur King	Dr. Sonoida	Nintendo DS		
2007	Professor Layton and the Diabolical Box	Beluga	Nintendo DS		
2012	One Piece: Pirate Warriors	Hannyabal	PlayStation 3		
2013	One Piece: Pirate Warriors 2	Hannyabal	PlayStation 3, PlayStation Vita		
2015	Dragon Ball Xenoverse	Tokitoki	Microsoft Windows, Nintendo Switch, PlayStation 3, PlayStation 4, Xbox 360, Xbox One		
2015	One Piece: Pirate Warriors 3	Hannyabal	PlayStation 3, PlayStation 4, PlayStation Vita, Microsoft Windows, Nintendo Switch		
2016	Monster Hunter Stories	Chief Omna	Nintendo 3DS, Android, iOS		
2016	Dragon Ball Xenoverse 2	Tokitoki	Microsoft Windows, PlayStation 4, Xbox One		
2017	Layton's Mystery Journey	Mustafa Fullhold	Nintendo 3DS, Android, iOS		
2019	Devil May Cry 5	King Cerberus	Microsoft Windows, PlayStation 4, Xbox One	Posthumous release	

=== Tokusatsu ===
- Shuriken Sentai Ninninger (2015) (Youkai Otoroshi (episode 18))

=== Dubbing roles ===
==== Live-action ====
- Kevin Dunn
  - Samantha Who? (Howard Newly)
  - Transformers (Ron Witwicky)
  - Transformers: Revenge of the Fallen (Ron Witwicky)
  - Transformers: Dark of the Moon (Ron Witwicky)
- Mum Jokmok
  - Ong-Bak: Muay Thai Warrior (Humlae/George)
  - The Bodyguard (Wong Kom)
  - Tom-Yum-Goong (Sergeant Mark)
  - Tom Yum Goong 2 (Sergeant Mark)
- 2 Fast 2 Furious (2006 TV Asahi edition) (Detective Whitworth (Mark Boone Junior))
- 50 First Dates (Ula (Rob Schneider))
- The 6th Day (Hank Morgan (Michael Rapaport))
- 8mm (Eddie Poole (James Gandolfini))
- Alice Through the Looking Glass (Humpty Dumpty)
- American Splendor (Harvey Pekar (Paul Giamatti))
- Atomic Blonde (Eric Gray (Toby Jones))
- Beautiful Days (Pong Da-roo)
- The Bridge on the River Kwai (Captain Kanematsu (Heihachiro Okawa))
- Casablanca (2013 Star Channel edition) (Captain Louis Renault (Claude Rains))
- Coco Before Chanel (Étienne Balsan (Benoît Poelvoorde))
- Con Air (2000 TV Asahi edition) (Mike "Baby-O" O'Dell (Mykelti Williamson))
- Cop Out (Hunsaker (Kevin Pollak))
- Crazy Heart (Wesley Barnes)
- Dead Ahead: The Exxon Valdez Disaster (Don Cornett)
- The Dictator (Mr. Lao (Bobby Lee))
- Die Hard with a Vengeance (1999 TV Asahi edition) (Charles Weiss (Kevin Chamberlin))
- Dragonheart 3: The Sorcerer's Curse (voice of Drago (Ben Kingsley)
- Elizabeth I (Robert Cecil (Toby Jones))
- End of Days (Albino (Victor Varnado))
- Fast & Furious (Arturo Braga / Ramon Campos (John Ortiz))
- Final Destination 5 (Dennis Lapman (David Koechner))
- Fred Claus (Willie (John Michael Higgins))
- The Godfather (2008 Blu-ray edition) (Peter Clemenza (Richard S. Castellano))
- Hancock (Red Parker (Eddie Marsan))
- Harry Potter and the Deathly Hallows – Part 2 (Bogrod)
- Harry's Law (Richard Cross (Jason Alexander))
- His New Job (Film Extra (Ben Turpin))
- Imagine That (Dante D'Enzo (Martin Sheen))
- Infernal Affairs III (Hon Sam (Eric Tsang))
- Joey (Howard Peckerman (Ben Falcone))
- Kung Fu Dunk (Zhen Wangli (Eric Tsang))
- A Life Less Ordinary (2001 TV Asahi edition) (Elliot Zweikel (Stanley Tucci))
- Live and Let Die (2006 Blu-ray edition) (Dr. Kananga / Mr. Big (Yaphet Kotto))
- Lock, Stock and Two Smoking Barrels (JD (Sting))
- Love & Other Drugs (Bruce Jackson (Oliver Platt))
- Machete (Padre Benicio Del Toro (Cheech Marin))
- The Machine (Thomson (Denis Lawson))
- Mad Max Beyond Thunderdome (2015 Supercharger edition) (Master (Angelo Rossitto))
- Mad Max: Fury Road (The People Eater (John Howard))
- The Man Who Invented Christmas (John Leech (Simon Callow))
- The Master (Lancaster Dodd (Philip Seymour Hoffman))
- Memento (John Edward "Teddy" Gammell (Joe Pantoliano))
- Mighty Joe Young (Garth (Peter Firth))
- The Negotiator (2001 TV Asashi edition) (Rudy Timmons (Paul Giamatti))
- Pandorum (Leland (Eddie Rouse))
- Private Practice (Nick (Michael Badalucco))
- Ready Player One (James Halliday / Anorak the All-Knowing (Mark Rylance))
- Season of the Witch (Hagamar (Stephen Graham))
- Shallow Hal (Mauricio Wilson (Jason Alexander))
- Snatch (2017 Blu-Ray edition) ("Brick Top" Pulford (Alan Ford))
- Star Wars: Episode III – Revenge of the Sith (General Grievous)
- Suits (Stan Jacobson (John Billingsley))
- The Taking of Pelham 123 (Phil Ramos (Luis Guzmán))
- The Transporter (Mr. Kwai (Ric Young))
- Year of the Dragon (1988 TBS edition) (Harry Yung (Victor Wong))

==== Animation ====
- Adventure Time (Duke of Nuts)
- Cars 2 (Tomber)
- Chuggington (Irving)
- Dr. Dolittle (Male Pigeon)
- Dr. Dolittle 2 (Possum)
- Finding Nemo (Nigel)
- The Grim Adventures of Billy & Mandy (Boogey Man)
- Billy & Mandy's Big Boogey Adventure (Boogey Man)
- Hotel Transylvania (Quasimodo)
- The Incredibles (Edna Mode)
- Incredibles 2 (Edna Mode)
- The Lion King 1½ (Doc)
- The Little Mermaid II: Return to the Sea (Scuttle)
- Planes: Fire & Rescue (Maru)
- Queer Duck: The Movie (Bi-Polar Bear)
- Ratchet & Clank (Chairman Drek)
- Robinson Crusoe (Scrubby)
- Robots (Mr. Gunk)
- Spider-Man (Mac Gargan)
- Spider-Man and His Amazing Friends (Mac Gargan)
- Star Wars: The Clone Wars (General Grievous)
- Tinker Bell and the Secret of the Wings (Dewey)
- Transformers: Animated (Dirt Boss)
- Turbo (Kim-Ly)
- Yin Yang Yo! (Carl)
- Zou (Grandpa)
