= Sisters (2019 film) =

2019 Thai horror film by Prachya Pinkaew

SisterS
- Theatrical release poster
- Thai: กระสือสยาม
- Directed by: Prachya Pinkaew
- Written by: Prachya Pinkaew; Sita Vosbein
- Produced by: Somsak Techaratanaprasert
- Starring: Nannaphas Loetnamchoetsakun; Ployyukhon Rojanakatanyoo; Rhatha Phongam; Supakorn Kitsuwon; Chinnaphat Kittichaiwarangkul; Wachirawit Ruangwiwat; Vasana Chalakorn
- Cinematography: Nattapol Niemklun
- Edited by: Prairung Bhandngam; Anan Rodprasert
- Music by: Terdsak Janpan
- Distributed by: Sahamongkol Film International; BNK48 Office
- Release date: 4 April 2019 (Thailand)
- Running time: 101 minutes
- Country: Thailand
- Language: Thai
- Box office: ฿6.9 Million

Sisters (Thai: กระสือสยาม; RTGS: Krasue Sayam; stylized as SisterS) is a 2019 Thai action horror film directed by Prachya Pinkaew. It stars Nannaphas Loetnamchoetsakun (Mewnich) and Ployyukhon Rojanakatanyoo (Jo). The story follows two sisters, Veena and Mora, whose late mother was a krasue hunter and, as a result, the queen of the krasue clan pledges vengeance on the girls.

== Cast and characters ==
=== Main ===
- Nannaphas Loetnamchoetsakun (Mewnich) as Mora
- Ployyukhon Rojanakatanyoo (Jo) as Veena

=== Supporting ===
- Rhatha Phongam (Ying) as Ratree
- Supakorn Kitsuwon (Tok) as Sing (Veena and Mora's father)
- Chinnaphat Kittichaiwarangkul (Flute) as Kong
- Wachirawit Ruangwiwat (Chimon) as Wen
- Apa Bhavilai (Maggi) as Duangdao (young)
- Vasana Chalakorn (Daeng) as Duangdao (old)

== Production ==
SisterS is the first horror movie by Prachya Pinkaew, the director of the action blockbusters Ong Bak and Tom Yum Goong. However, the idea for SisterS dates back to 1997, when Prachya was still working at GMM Grammy. At the time, it was on his list of projects to work on with Ong Bak, and he considered naming it Krasue 2000 or Krasue Y2K. He came up with the idea to make a krasue-related movie since he has been fascinated by the ghost after he watched Krasue Sao (1973) when he was a kid. After he left GMM Grammy and went to work on Ong Bak with Sahamongkol Film International, the project was put on hold until it began filming in early 2018.

== Release and reception ==
A gala premiere for SisterS was held at SF World Cinema, CentralWorld on April 2, 2019, and was attended by the entire cast and almost all of BNK48 members, since one of the main leads, Mewnich, is a part of the group. It officially released in Thai theatres on April 4, 2019. After 19 days of release, the film grossed 6.9 million baht.

On August 12, 2019, the movie was officially released on Netflix, even though it's only available in certain countries. Later it managed to gain a slot at the 2019 Tokyo International Film Festival.
