= The Kick (film) =

2011 film by Prachya Pinkaew

- Theatrical release poster
- Directed by: Prachya Pinkaew
- Screenplay by: Lee Jong-suk
- Story by: Prachya Pinkaew; Lee Jong-suk; Kiat Songsanant; Thanakorn Pongsuwan
- Produced by: Gang Seong-gyu
- Starring: Jeeja Yanin; Petchtai Wongkamlao; Cho Jae-hyun; Ye Ji-won; Na Tae-joo; Kim Kyeong-suk; Lee Gwan-hun
- Cinematography: Teerawat Rujintham
- Edited by: Saknakorn Nethan
- Music by: Terdsak Janpan
- Production companies: Baa-Ram-Ewe; Bangkok Film Studio
- Distributed by: Sahamongkol Film International; Showbox/Mediaplex (South Korea); Lionsgate (United States)
- Release date: 3 November 2011
- Running time: 94 minutes
- Countries: Thailand; South Korea
- Languages: Thai; Korean; English
- Budget: $3,500,000
- Box office: $344,288

The Kick (Korean: 더 킥; Thai: วอนโดนเตะ!!) is a 2011 Thai martial arts film, directed by Prachya Pinkaew. The film follows a Korean family of taekwondo experts who immigrate to Thailand.

== Plot ==
Mun is a Korean immigrant to Thailand and a taekwondo master running an old taekwondo gym in Bangkok. All five members of his family are also taekwondo exponents, each of whom infuses the art with a particular skill: his wife Mija in the cooking style, his son Taeyang in the dancing style, his daughter Taemi in the soccer style, and the youngest, Typhoon, in the style of brute strength; he can break anything with his strong forehead.

Mun wants his children to become taekwondo coaches and take over his gym in the future. However, Taeyang wants to be a famous pop singer, and Taemi is only interested in her classmate at school, whom she harbors a secret crush on.

One day, Taeyang foils a gang's attempt to steal a priceless antique kris. Pom, the leader of the gang, is the only one to escape and threatens revenge. Mun's family becomes more popular in the public eye, but they do not know when or where Pom will try to get his revenge and must put aside their differences to stand up for their family.

== Cast ==
- Cho Jae-hyun as Master Mun
- Ye Ji-won as Yun Mija
- Na Tae-ju as Taeyang
- Kim Gyeongsuk as Taemi
- Do Shigang as Beom
- Lee Hundon as Seokdu
- Kim Yiroo as Yiroo
- Yanin Vismitananda as Wawa
- Petchtai Wongkamlao as Uncle Mam
