= Conan Stevens =

Australian actor

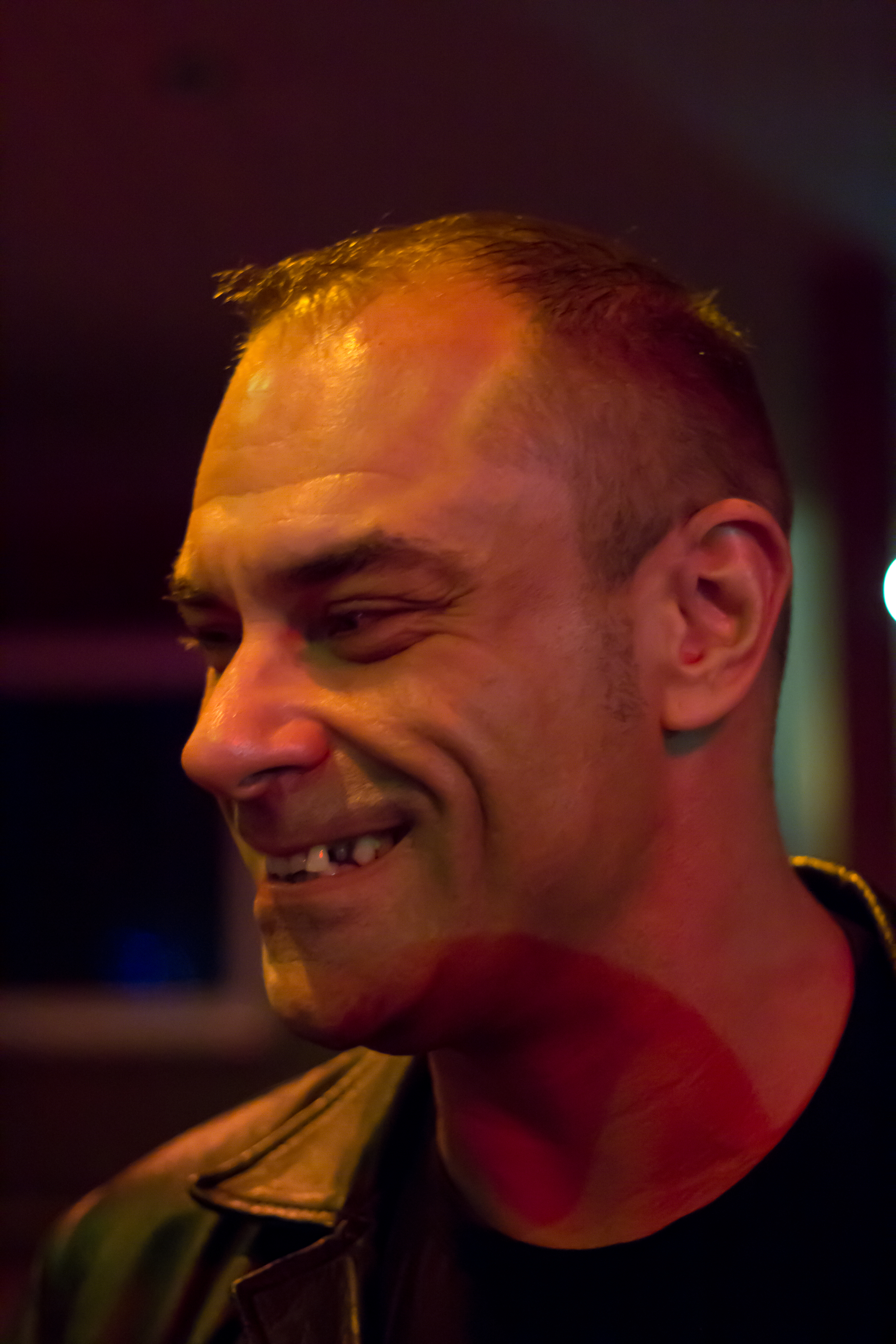
- Conan Stevens in 2012
- Born: Mark Stevens; 30 November 1969 (age 56); Newcastle, New South Wales, Australia
- Occupation: Actor
- Height: 2.13 m (7 ft 0 in)

Mark "Conan" Stevens is an Australian actor and former professional wrestler as 7 FT Thunder. He is 2.13m (7’) tall.

== Career ==
Stevens portrayed giant green swamp creature of Man-Thing in Marvel's Man-Thing film and Gregor Clegane ("The Mountain") in the first season of the HBO television series Game of Thrones. He was cast to portray Bolg, son of Azog, in Peter Jackson's Hobbit trilogy, and completed a portion of the films' photography in makeup as the character. He was subsequently replaced in the role by Lord of the Rings trilogy veteran Lawrence Makoare when Bolg was revamped into a completely CGI character. He ended up playing an unnamed Gundabad Orc, called "Keeper of the Dungeons" in The Hobbit: The Battle of the Five Armies.

Stevens co-wrote the 2009 martial arts film, Bangkok Adrenaline.

== Filmography ==
Year	Title	Role	Notes
2005	Man-Thing	Dr. Ted Sallis / Man-Thing	Main role
2007	Treasure Island	Cascadeurs	
2007	The Bodyguard 2	Big Security Guard	(uncredited)
2008	Somtum	Jo Jo	
2008	The White Monkey Warrior	Fight Club Gang Leader	(uncredited)
2008	Drona	Asura	Bollywood Movie
2008	E-Tim tai nae	Wrestler	
2009	Chandni Chowk to China	Joey	Bollywood Movie
2009	Force of Five	Ambassadors Bodyguard	
2009	Bangkok Adrenaline	Conan	
2010	True Legend	Malotoff	
2011	Largo Winch 2 - The Burma Conspiracy	Nazachov's Bodyguard	(uncredited)
2012	The Hobbit: An Unexpected Journey	Keeper of the Dungeons	Despite this, he is credited in the film as Bolg.
2013	Vikingdom	Thor	
2013	Mystic Blade	Butch	
2013	A Man Will Rise	Unknown	(uncompleted)
2014	The Hobbit: The Battle of the Five Armies	Keeper of the Dungeons (Gundabad Orc)	
2015	Skin Trade	Igor	
2015	Runestone	Rauthr Wulfgrimm	
2015	Brothers	Luca	Bollywood Movie
2016	Kumander Baltazar	Johnny	First Filipino indie movie
2017	Dead Squad	Z13	
2018	Blood Hunters: Rise of the Hybrids		Second Filipino movie

=== Television ===
Year	Title	Role	Notes
2011	Game of Thrones	"The Mountain" Gregor Clegane	(2 episodes)
2012	Spartacus: Vengeance	Sedullus	(1 episode)
2013	The Bible	Goliath	
2016; 2017	Encantadia	Vish'ka	Special participation
2017	Super Ma'am	Baraka The Tamawo	Special participation
2018	Victor Magtanggol	Thor	Special participation

== Championships and accomplishments ==
- International Wrestling Australia
  - IWA Heavyweight Championship (2 time)
