= Pumwaree Yodkamol =

Thai actress

- ภุมวารี ยอดกมล
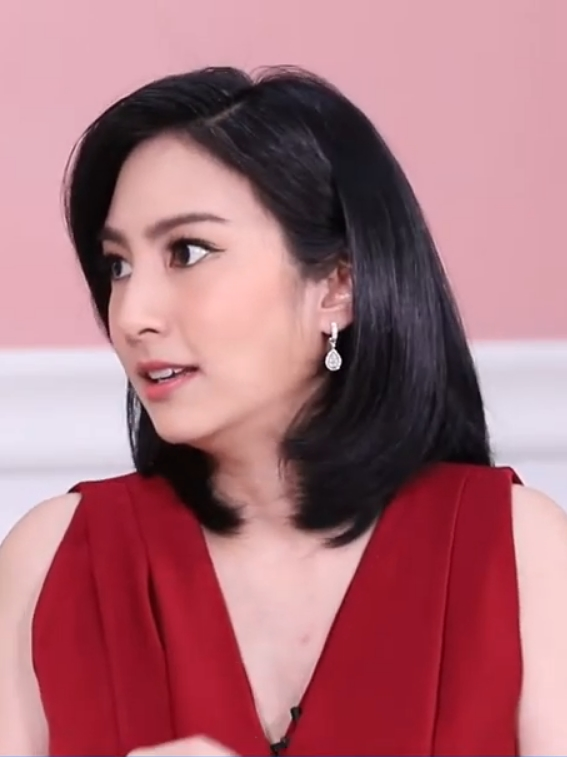
- Yodkamol in 2021
- Born: February 9, 1982 (age 43); Bangkok, Thailand
- Occupation: Actress
- Notable work: Ong-Bak
- Height: 5 ft 1 3/4 in (1.57 m)

Pumwaree Yodkamol (Thai: ภุมวารี ยอดกมล; RTGS: Phum-wari Yotkamon; born February 9, 1982, in Bangkok) is a Thai film and television actress. She co-starred in Ong-Bak, portraying Muay Lek alongside Tony Jaa. Other roles include The Bodyguard, where she played Pok, and Pisaj, in the role of Oui.

Yodkamol appears on the Channel 3 (Thailand) variety show In the Dark and other shows.

== Personal life ==
Yodkamol married Athit Punyanutrakul, nicknamed Art, on November 16, 2014, after two years of dating. The couple has one son, nicknamed "Hok," who was born on March 6, 2020.

On March 15, 2019, she ordained as a Buddhist nun at Santi Asoke to show gratitude to her parents.

== Filmography ==
=== Television series ===
Year	Title	Role
2001	Pee Liang Geung Samretroop	Aom
2003	Wimarn Din	Pimprai
2004	Khum Sab Amata Nakorn	Mamia
2004	Rak Wan La Nit	Jaravee
2005	Mong Dang	Darin
2005	Gang Suep 07	Toemrak
2007	Girl Cup Rab Huajai Sai Pratoo	Dokfai
2013	Ngoh Tae Sae Hero	Pattie
2014	Khun Chai Rakre	Natlada
2019	Abandoned	Namkang
2021	Don't Say No	Fiat's stepmother
2025	Lost in the Woods	Fifa's mother

=== Films ===
Year	Title	Role
2003	Ong-Bak	Muay Lek
2004	The Bodyguard	Pok
2004	Pisaj	Oui
2005	Tom-Yum-Goong	Girl on the street
