= Boonpitak Chitkrachang =

Thai actress and model (1973-1995)

- บุญพิทักษ์ จิตต์กระจ่าง
- Born: Boonpitak Chitkrachang; 26 June 1973; Chonburi, Thailand
- Died: October 27, 1995 (aged 22); Banglamung Hospital, Chonburi, Thailand
- Other name: Kae
- Education: Ramkhamhaeng University
- Occupations: Actress; model; television host
- Years active: 1991–1995
- Height: 1.63 m (5 ft 4 in)

Boonpitak Chitkrachang (Thai: บุญพิทักษ์ จิตต์กระจ่าง; 26 June 1973 - 27 October 1995) was a Thai actress and model who was the lead actress in many Thai series during the 1990s. She had the lead role in the 1994 romantic melodrama Eternal Love (ขอให้รักเรานั้นนิรันดร)

== Early life ==
Boonpitak Chitkrachang was born on June 26, 1973, in Si Racha, Chonburi, Thailand. She was born in a Thai Catholic household. She had one younger brother, Kriangkrai Chitkrachang. She graduated from Darasamutr School and then studied at Ramkhamhaeng University, majoring in humanities.

== Career ==
She started her career when she was 18 years old from the 1991 Pan Cosmetic pageant, which she later won in that competition. Her talent and beauty prominently made Mayurachat Muenpasitiwet, a famous Thai actress and producer, encourage her to be an actress for Thai Channel 3. In 1992, She was starring in a music video and appeared in her first television series, “See Yak Nee Ar Yu Noi (สี่แยกนี้อายุน้อย).”She went on to star in many more films and television series. Her biggest role was in Eternal Love (ขอให้รักเรานั้นนิรันดร), starring with Pongpat Wachirabunjong in 1994.

== Death ==
Boonpitak died on 27 October 1995 in a car crash at the Rong Po Market curve in Chonburi while her driver was driving at high speed. The crash also resulted in the death of her brother Kriangkrai Chitkrachang. The driver and her brother’s girlfriend survived the crash. Her public funeral was held at Wat Phra Sri Mahathat Woramahawihan in Bangkok, Thailand for 3 days and her body was later buried at the Sacred Heart Catholic Church in her hometown.

== Filmography ==
Television

Year	Title	Role	Network
1992	See Yak Ne Ar Yu Noi	Kaew	Channel 3
1993	Mae Ploy Hong	Wan	Channel 3
1994	Koh Hai Rak Rao Nan Nirandorn (Eternal Love)	Lantharima	Channel 3
1994	Tukta Manus	Paew Waew	Channel 3
1995	Kreng Kong Hua Jai	Miss Pen	Channel 3
1995	Plerng Boon	Jai Rueng	Channel 3
