= Sayew =

2003 film by Kongdej Jaturanrasamee

- Theatrical release poster
- Directed by: Kongdej Jaturanrasamee; Kiat Songsanant
- Written by: Kongdej Jaturanrasamee; Kiat Songsanant
- Produced by: Prachya Pinkaew; Siwaporn Pongsuwan; Sukanya Vongsthapat
- Starring: Pimpaporn Leenutapong
- Cinematography: Sayombhu Mukdeeprom
- Edited by: Lee Chatametikool
- Music by: Apichet Kamphu; Chaibundit Peuchponsub
- Distributed by: Sahamongkol Film International
- Release date: 28 February 2003
- Running time: 113 minutes
- Country: Thailand
- Language: Thai

Sayew (Thai: สยิว, also Spasm or X-Rated Sex Story: Fact or Fiction) is a 2003 Thai romantic comedy film about a naive female college student who works as a writer of erotic stories for a pornographic magazine.

== Plot ==
Tao is a tomboyish university student who supports her studies by writing for her uncle's racy pulp pornographic magazine Sayew, despite the fact that she has never had sex herself. The magazine is struggling financially, so Tao's uncle, Dr. Porn, tells her she needs to spice up her stories or else be sacked.

After writing fantasies about her neighbors doesn't work, Tao takes the advice of her uncle and starts reaching for first-hand experience to draw on, turning to the macho magazine photographer and writer, Young Stallion. However, the sexually uncertain Tao also has fantasies about a female classmate, Mui.

== Cast ==
- Pimpaporn Leenutapong as Tao
- Nuntawat Arsirapojcharnakul as Jon
- Anon Saisangcharn as Young Stallion
- Phintusuda Tunphairao as Mui
- Jutarat Atthakorn as Dr. Porn

== Festivals and awards ==
Sayew was screened at several film festivals in 2003, including the Deauville Asian Film Festival, the Vancouver International Film Festival and the Stockholm International Film Festival. At the Seattle International Film Festival, the film won an honorable mention for the Asian Trade Winds Award.
