= Kullasatree Siripongpreeda =

Thai actress (born 1973)

- Born: Kullasatree Siripongpreeda; 2 August 1973 (age 53); Bangkok, Thailand
- Other names: Nitchayanat, Ning
- Citizenship: Thai
- Education: Saint John's University (SJU); Ramkhamhaeng University (RU)
- Occupations: Actress; air hostess
- Years active: 1992–2006
- Spouse: Pairat Intarasak (m. 2006)

Kullasatree Siripongpreeda (Thai: กุลสตรี ศิริพงษ์ปรีชา, born 2 August 1973), nicknamed Nitchayanat (ณิชชยาณัฐ), is a Thai former actress who used to be famous and popular in the '90s.

== Early life and education ==
Kullasatree, who goes by the nickname "Ning" (นิ้ง), was born in Thai Chinese family in Bangkok. She graduated from the Faculty of Communication Arts, Saint John's University and the Faculty of Political Science, Ramkhamhaeng University.

== Career ==
Kullasatree made her first debut in Itti Balangura's MV Kid Arai Yu with Jukrit Ammarat in 1994. Afterward, she made her first appearance onscreen in TV drama Poot Pitsawat on Channel 7 in 1995 with famous singer Touch Na Takuatung, whom she dated at the time. That same year, with the popularity of the lovers, they starred together again in the supernatural fantasy film Dark Side Romance by Prachya Pinkaew.

In 1996, she starred in the period drama Yatika, the second part of Sai Lohit and was followed by Rattanakosin, another period drama with a similar theme, but not related. They both aired on Channel 7. In 1997, she received a golden doll award for "Best Actress" from Dreamers, a drama film directed by Ong-Art Singlumpong. She plays the role of Pim, a young woman with ambitions of becoming a superstar singer. Around 2006, Kullasatree left the showbiz to pursue a career that she was passionate about. She became a full-time air hostess of Thai AirAsia, and still is present.

== Personal life ==
Kullasatree married her pilot husband, Pairat Intarasak, in late 2006.
