= A Man Will Rise =

Unreleased Western film by Tony Jaa

- Jaa and Lundgren on the film set.
- Directed by: Tony Jaa; Vitidnan Rojanapanich
- Written by: David Anderson; Gabe Burnstein
- Produced by: Julaluck Ismalone
- Starring: Tony Jaa; Dolph Lundgren; Conan Stevens; Byron Gibson
- Production companies: Sahamongkol Film International; Neo Motion Films
- Distributed by: Sahamongkol Film International
- Running time: Unknown
- Country: Thailand
- Language: English
- Budget: Unknown

A Man Will Rise (originally known as Local Hero) is an incomplete comedy Western film directed by Tony Jaa and Vitidnan Rojanapanich, and starring Jaa, Dolph Lundgren, Conan Stevens, and Byron Gibson. Set in 1950s Thailand, the film follows a local gangster who terrorizes a town. When a young man opposes him, the gangster hires a group of foreign hit men to kill the rebel and silence the town.

In January 2013, Jean-Claude Van Damme was rumored to be co-starring alongside Jaa; in reality, he was never available due to scheduling issues, and as a result, Lundgren was cast as an alternative. The film entered production in April 2013, but came to an abrupt halt after three months of filming. Sahamongkol Film International filed a $49–50 million lawsuit against Jaa, Universal Pictures, and United International Pictures, claiming Jaa was in breach of his contract by accepting a role in Fast and Furious 7. After two years of legal proceedings, Sahamongkol dropped the lawsuit in July 2015. Despite this, production of A Man Will Rise has not continued, and the film remains incomplete.

== Plot ==
A gangster terrorizes a town. A local man stands up against him, so the gangster calls in foreign hitmen dressed like cowboys to assist him.

== Cast ==
- Tony Jaa as Unknown
- Dolph Lundgren as Unknown
- Conan Stevens as "Cowboy Hitman"
- David Islamone as "Cowboy Hitman"
- Byron Gibson as Diego
- Damian Mavis as Cowboy Gangster
- Russell Geoffrey Banks as Cowboy Gangster
- Manel Soler as Cowboy Gangster
- Jakkrit Kanokpodjananon as Unknown
- Leigh Barwell as Mexican Prostitute
- Alexandra Merle as Mexican Prostitute

== Production ==
=== Development ===
News of the film first emerged under the working title of Local Hero in January 2013. Jean-Claude Van Damme was rumored to be co-starring alongside Jaa, but he could not commit due to scheduling issues; he was filming Swelter at the time. Dolph Lundgren was cast as an alternative.

=== Filming ===
Filming began in April 2013; Jaa was announced as co-director the same month. After three months of filming, production came to an abrupt halt with only 20% of the film complete. Sahamongkol Film International filed a $49–50 million lawsuit against Jaa, Universal Pictures, and United International Pictures in September 2013, claiming that Jaa was in breach of his contract by accepting the role of Kiet in Fast and Furious 7. Sahamongkol based their sum on the cost of launching Jaa's career and loss of future earnings, plus an additional 7.5% interest. They attempted to halt the release of Fast and Furious 7 in Thailand, and on March 27, 2015, a civil court approved, blocking release the film until a settlement had been reached by both parties. The court came to its decision after interviewing two employees of Sahamongkol: Akarapol Karasaranee, the son of the company's president, Somsak Techaratanaprasert; and Suwat Apaipak, a member of Sahamongkol's legal team. In response to the allegations, Jaa stated that his contract with Sahamongkol had ended. He claimed that it was terminated through his lawyer in 2013, describing it as "business slavery" due to its allegedly overrestrictive terms and conditions. Sahamongkol claimed that the contract had been renewed for another ten years, through 2023. In the suit, Sahamangkol also requested that Jaa pay back his salary for A Man Will Rise, reportedly ฿26 million ($722,000). The legal matters surrounding the lawsuit have prevented the completion of the film, and although the lawsuit was dropped in July 2015, the film remains unfinished. There are currently no plans to complete the film.
