= Fake (2003 film) =

- Thai theatrical poster
- Directed by: Thanakorn Pongsuwan
- Written by: Joon Bum Ahn; Siwaporn Pongsuwan; Thanakorn Pongsuwan
- Produced by: Prachya Pinkaew; Siwaporn Pongsuwan; Sukanya Vongsthapat
- Starring: Leo Putt; Ray MacDonald; Paopol Thephasdin; Pachrapa Chaichua
- Cinematography: Decha Srimantra; Sittipong Kongtong
- Edited by: Lee Chatametikool; Thanakorn Pongsuwan; Max Tersch
- Music by: Apichet Kumphu; Chaibundit Peuchponsub; Paopol Thephasdin
- Distributed by: Sahamongkol Film International
- Release date: 28 April 2003
- Running time: 109 minutes
- Country: Thailand
- Language: Thai

Fake (Thai: เฟค โกหกทั้งเพ) is a 2003 Thai romantic drama film directed by Thanakorn Pongsuwan. It starred Leo Putt (Putthipong Sriwat), Ray MacDonald, Tah Barby (Phaopol Thephatsadin na Ayutthaya) and Pachrapa Chaichua. The debut feature by Thanakorn, it was screened at the Vancouver International Film Festival, the Stockholm International Film Festival and the Singapore International Film Festival in 2003 and 2004.

== Plot ==
Three young hipster men who share an apartment in Bangkok are each chasing after a woman, but are unaware that it's the same woman they are after.

== Cast ==
- Leo Putt (Putthipong Sriwat) as Poh
- Ray MacDonald as Sung
- Tah Barby (Phaopol Thephatsadin na Ayutthaya) as Bay
- Pachrapa Chaichua as Paweena
