= Pisaj =

House of Ghosts Pisaj (Evil)
- Movie poster for Pisaj
- Directed by: Chookiat Sakveerakul
- Written by: Chookiat Sakveerakul
- Produced by: Prachya Pinkaew; Sukanya Vongsthapat; Yuthana Boonorm; Pongnarin Ulice
- Starring: Pumwaree Yodkamol; Alexander Rendell; Amora Purananda; Dreradanai Suwanhom
- Cinematography: Chitti Urnorakankij
- Edited by: Prapob Surasakulwat; Mittree Saengprachathanarak
- Music by: Kitti Kuremanee
- Production company: Baa-Ram-Ewe Production
- Distributed by: Sahamongkol Film International
- Release date: February 20, 2004 (Thailand)
- Running time: 105 minutes
- Country: Thailand
- Language: Thai

Pisaj or Evil (Thai: คน ผี ปีศาจ; RTGS: Khon Phi Pisat; literally Human, Ghost, Demon) is a 2004 Thai horror film written and directed by Chookiat Sakveerakul.

== Plot ==
After her parents are killed in a drive-by shooting, a young woman named Oui has no place else to go. She shows up at a printing house run by her Aunt Bua and is given the task of caring for her aunt's grandson, a young boy named Arm, a kid who sees ghosts.

Oui has hallucinations, brought on by the trauma of seeing her parents killed, and is taking medications. And Aunt Bua is involved in some sort of mysticism, and keeps a strange shrine in the house.

== Cast ==
- Pumwaree Yodkamol as Oui
- Alexander Rendell as Arm
- Amora Purananda as Aunt Bua
- Dreranai Suwanhom as Mai
- Jarunee Boonsake as Noi
- Wasana Onmak as Sudjai
- Prinn Vadhanavira as Mystery Man

== See also ==
- List of ghost films
- Pishacha
