= See How They Run =

See How They Run may refer to:

- See How They Run (play), a 1945 play by Philip King
  - See How They Run (1955 film), a British film adaptation of the play
- See How They Run (1964 film), an American TV film
- See How They Run (2002 film) a French film
- See How They Run (2006 film) a Thai film
- See How They Run (2022 film), a British-American film
- See How They Run (TV series), a 1999 British-Australian children's TV series
- "See How They Run", a 1951 short story by Mary Elizabeth Vroman, adapted into a film called Bright Road
