= Heaven's Seven =

Heaven's Seven 7 ประจัญบาน
- Film poster
- Directed by: Chalerm Wong Pim
- Written by: Chalerm Wong Pim
- Produced by: Prachya Pinkaew
- Starring: Pongpat Wachirabunjong; Pongsak Pongsuwan; Thodsapol Siriwiwat; Amarin itipon Pisek Intrakanchit; Cham Charum; Akom Preedakul
- Cinematography: Sayombhu Mukdeeprom; Nattawut Kittikhun
- Edited by: Channarong Techaboonsermsak
- Music by: Traithep Wongpaiboon
- Distributed by: Thailand; Sahamongkolfilm International
- Release date: 26 April 2002
- Running time: 110 minutes
- Country: Thailand
- Language: Thai
- Box office: 8.3 million baht

Heaven's Seven (Thai: 7 ประจัญบาน) is a 2002 Thai action-comedy film directed by Chalerm Wongpim. It is a remake of a 1977 television movie, which itself was based on the third part of an original film that was shown on 22 January 1963 in Thailand. Heaven's Seven was released on 26 April 2002.

This film was later adapted into a television drama series in 2010, broadcast on Channel 3. Pongpat Wachirabanjong, who played Sergeant Dub Champao in the 2002 version, returned to play the same role, along with Sorapong Chatree, who played Dun Mahitha in the 1977 version. Later in 2025, it was adapted into a television drama again, with plans to broadcast on Channel 7HD in 2026.

== Plot ==
The story of the movie starts when group of seven Thai Army Black Panthers Division finish their last risky mission in Vietnam War. They retire from the military and go on to continue ordinary life with their families. However, bad memories still haunt them. Later, a merchant hires them to steal a load of gold from a truck caravan. Unfortunately, these belong to G.I.s of the U.S.Army. The U.S. soldiers are angry about the theft and try to catch the seven soldiers by attacking the Thai soldier's village. After the U.S. troops capture all the villagers, they make the villagers slaves. Meanwhile, the seven Thai fighters learn that the trucks do not contain any gold, but they contain dangerous chemical agent that U.S. forces intend use to destroy forests in Vietnam. Then, they go to the U.S. military camp to fight against the Americans and successfully rescue their people to save their friends and relatives. The movie ends with Juk's ordination for his mother, which suddenly turned into his mother's funeral after she was too happy and died.

== Cast ==
- Pongpat Wachirabunjong as Sgt. Dab Jampoh
- Pongsak Pongsuwan as Mhad Cherngmuay
- Thodsapol Siriwiwat as Tanguay Sae-lee
- Amarin Nitibhon as Akkhi Mekyant
- Pisek Intrakanchit as Dhan Mahittha
- Cham Charum as Kla talumpook
- Akom Preedakul as Juk Biewsakul

== Previous adaptation ==
In 1977, Sahamongkol Film produced the first remake of the original 1963 film. It was directed by Wichian Veerachote and starred:

- Thaksin Jaempol as Sergeant Dub Champao;
- Lak Aphichart as Moet Cheangmuay;
- Sriprai Jaiphra as Tangkuay Saelee;
- Krung Sriwilai as Akki Mekyan;
- Sorapong Chatree as Dun Mahitha;
- Nirut Sirijanya as Kla Talumphuk;
- Sayan Chantarawiboon as Juk Biawsakul

== Release ==
On release, Heaven's Seven became one of the highest-grossing films of all time in Thailand, earning about 8.3 million baht at the box office. Later, Chalern Wong Pim made a sequel called Heaven's Seven 2 (Thai: 7 ประจัญบาน ภาค 2), which was released on 28 April 2005.
