= Premier Asia =

British DVD distribution company

Premier Asia was a UK DVD distribution company, operating between the years 2003 and 2008. It was owned by Medusa Communications throughout its first year. In 2004, Contender Entertainment Group took over Medusa Communications, including both Premier Asia and its sister label, Hong Kong Legends. In 2007, Contender was themselves purchased by Entertainment One (now Lionsgate Canada). Premier Asia is the sister company of Hong Kong Legends, and whilst that company specialised only in Hong Kong films, Premier Asia encompassed films from all of the major film making centres of Asia (outside of mainland China), specifically Japan, South Korea & Thailand.

In keeping with the Hong Kong Legends DVD format, many of the earlier releases included audio commentaries from Hong Kong cinema expert, producer and screenwriter Bey Logan, he would be partnered for many releases here with Asian cinema expert Mike Leeder.

== Releases ==
- Bang Rajan
- Bichunmoo
- Brotherhood
- Champion
- The City of Violence
- Crying Fist
- Duelist
- Ju-on: The Grudge
- Ju-on: The Grudge 2
- Ichi the Killer
- Ichi the Killer : Episode Zero (anime)
- Initial D
- My Wife Is a Gangster
- Once Upon a Time in High School
- One Missed Call
- Ong-Bak
- Shutter
- The Warrior
- Typhoon
- Warrior King
- Volcano High
