= Kongdej Jaturanrasamee =

Thai film director

- คงเดช จาตุรันต์รัศมี
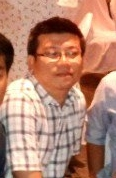
- Kongdej in 2011
- Born: 1972 (age 53–54); Bangkok, Thailand
- Education: King Mongkut's Institute of Technology Ladkrabang
- Occupations: Film director; screenwriter; musician

Kongdej Jaturanrasamee (Thai: คงเดช จาตุรันต์รัศมี, born 1972) is a Thai screenwriter, film director and former musician. His screenplays include The Letter, Tom-Yum-Goong, Noo Hin: The Movie and Me ... Myself. His own films include Sayew and Midnight My Love.

== Biography ==
=== Education, early career ===
Kongdej graduated from the film department at King Mongkut's Institute of Technology Ladkrabang. He began his career in the late 1990s directing music videos for the record label RS Promotion. He also wrote screenplays for the company's then new RS Film, but none were ever produced.

In addition, he also a member of Si Tao Thoe, an alternative rock band popular in the mid-90s of the Thai music industry.

=== Sayew, The Letter ===
Kongdej made his directorial debut with Sayew, which he co-wrote and co-directed with Kiat Songsanant. A comedy about a tomboyish young woman exploring sex and her sexuality, it won an honorable mention Asian Trade Winds Award at the 2003 Seattle International Film Festival.

He had also been approached by producer Duangkamol Limcharoen to write the screenplay for the romantic drama, The Letter, a 2004 Thai remake of a 1997 Korean film. The film was a hit, and with the screenplay, Kongdej became a sought-after scriptwriter. He also wrote the screenplay for the 2005 Tony Jaa martial arts film, Tom-Yum-Goong.

=== Midnight My Love ===
His first solo directorial effort, 2005's Midnight My Love, was nominated for several Thailand National Film Association Awards, including best director and best screenplay. It won best director and best script awards from the Bangkok Critics Assembly. The romantic comedy-drama starred comedian Petchtai Wongkamlao in a dramatic role as a melancholy taxi driver who develops a relationship with a massage parlor worker (Woranut Wongsawan). Midnight My Love was featured at several film festivals, including the Deauville Asian Film Festival, Cinefan and the Chicago International Film Festival.

He also wrote the screenplay for the 2006 comic-book adaptation Noo Hin: The Movie and the 2007 romantic comedy Me ... Myself.

His 2008 romantic comedy is Kod (กอด), about "a three-armed man and a big-bosomed girl."

Other projects include the screenplay for Nonzee Nimibutr's 2008 fantasy, Queen of Langkasuka.

== Filmography ==
Year	Title	Director	Writer
2003	Sayew	Yes	Yes
2004	The Letter (Jod mai rak)	No	Yes
2005	Midnight My Love (Cherm)	Yes	Yes
2005	Tom-Yum-Goong (The Protector)	No	Yes
2006	Noo Hin: The Movie	No	Yes
2007	Me ... Myself	No	Yes
2008	Handle Me With Care (Kod)	Yes	Yes
2008	Queen of Langkasuka	No	Yes
2008	Happy Birthday	No	Yes
2011	P-047	Yes	Yes
2013	Tang Wong	Yes	Yes
2015	So Be It	Yes	Yes
2015	Snap	Yes	Yes
2019	Where we belong	Yes	Yes
2023	Hunger	No	Yes

Actor

- Romantic Blue (Lohk thang bai hai naai khon diao) (1995)
- Baan phii sing (2007)
