= The Sperm =

2007 film by Taweewat Wantha

- Theatrical poster
- Directed by: Taweewat Wantha
- Screenplay by: Siwaporn Pongsuwan; Kiat Songsanant; Taweewat Wantha
- Story by: Prachya Pinkaew; Siwaporn Pongsuwan; Kiat Songsanant
- Produced by: Prachya Pinkaew; Sukanya Vongsthapat; Siwaporn Pongsuwan; Sita Vosbein
- Starring: Leo Putt
- Cinematography: Taweewat Wantha
- Edited by: Lee Chatametikool
- Distributed by: Sahamongkol Film International
- Release date: 22 March 2007
- Running time: 86 minutes
- Country: Thailand
- Language: Thai

The Sperm (Thai: อสุจ๊าก, or Asujaak) is a 2007 Thai science fiction comedy film directed by Taweewat Wantha.

== Plot ==
A young, struggling Bangkok rock musician, Sutin, constantly dreams about almost having sex with sexy model-actress La-mai, but always wakes up before he can actually have sex. When he wins a chance to appear in a battle of the bands contest, and La-mai presents the prize, he is not sure he is dreaming, so he crudely propositions La-mai on live television. Embarrassed by what he's done, Sutin proceeds to go out to dinner with his bandmates and become very intoxicated. Later that night, he masturbates in front of a poster of La-mai, and then the next day thousands of women in the city become pregnant. The women then give birth to abnormal, fast-growing babies that all look like Sutin.

Observing the proceedings is a scientist, Dr. Satifeung, and assisted by his daughter, he tries to come up with a way to stop the "look alike gang", but soon there are bigger problems.

== Cast ==
- Leo Putt as Sutin
- Pimpaporn Leenutapong as La-mai
- Somlek Sakdikul as Dr. Satifeung
- Dollaros Dachapratumwan as Doctor's daughter
- Nuttawut Srimhog as Prasert
- Chakrapong Siririn as Surachai
