= The Bodyguard 2 =

- Thai theatrical poster
- Directed by: Petchtai Wongkamlao
- Written by: Petchtai Wongkamlao
- Produced by: Prachya Pinkaew; Sukanya Vongsthapat; Petchtai Wongkamlao
- Starring: Petchtai Wongkamlao; Tony Jaa
- Cinematography: Jiradech Samniangsanor
- Edited by: Boonchai Apintanaphong
- Distributed by: Sahamongkol Film International
- Release date: March 8, 2007
- Running time: 95 minutes
- Country: Thailand
- Languages: Thai; Isan
- Budget: 100,000,000 baht

The Bodyguard 2 (Thai: บอดี้การ์ดหน้าเหลี่ยม 2) is a 2007 Thai action-comedy film written, directed by and starring Petchtai Wongkamlao. A prequel to his 2004 film, The Bodyguard, The Bodyguard 2 tells the origins of Petchtai's bodyguard character, and like the first film, it features a host of cameo appearances by Thai celebrities, including action star Tony Jaa.

With a budget of over 100,000,000 baht, the film was the most expensive in Thai cinema before Ong Bak 2 surpassed it in late 2008.

== Plot ==
Khamlao is a Black op Counter-terrorismsecret agent for the country of Wongnaileum, which shares the common Isan dialect and culture with its neighboring country, Thailand (similar to [Laos]). He is dispatched to Bangkok on a secret mission to track down some terrorists. To do so, he goes undercover as a luk thung singer working for a record label that serves as a front company for dealers in weapons of mass destruction. As he probes deep inside the record company, he finds that the company's executive secretary is actually a CIA agent, assigned to the same mission. Meanwhile, Khamlao's wife, Keaw, discovers that Khamlao had lied to her about his job in Thailand.

The film ends where the first film starts.

== Cast ==
- Petchtai Wongkamlao as Khamlao / Khum Lhau
- Janet Keaw as Keaw
- Jacqueline Apitananon as Paula
- Sushin Kuan-saghaun as Sushin
- Surachai Sombatchareon as Surachai
- Pongsak Pongsuwan as Guru
- Tony Jaa as Elephant vendor
