= Na Tae-ju =

South Korean entertainer and taekwondoin (born 1990)

- Born: December 21, 1990 (age 35); Seoul, South Korea
- Education: Kyung Hee University
- Occupations: Actor; singer; taekwondo practitioner
- Years active: 2010–present

Korean name
- Hangul: 나태주
- Hanja: 羅太柱
- RR: Na Taeju
- MR: Na T'aeju

Na Tae-ju (Korean: 나태주, born December 21, 1990) is a South Korean actor, singer, and martial artist. He is best known for playing the role of Tae-yang in The Kick. He made his Hollywood debut in film Pan (2015). He is the winner of the KNSU Taekwondo competition in 2007. He currently splits his time between Seoul and London. He holds a 4th degree black belt.

== Filmography ==
=== Films ===
Year	Title	Role	Notes	Ref.
2010	Hero	Jung-woo		
2011	The Kick	Tae-yang		
2015	Pan	Kwahu		

=== Television series ===
Year	Title	Role	Notes	Ref.
2020	Zombie Detective	Taekwondo Master	Cameo	

=== Television shows ===
Year	Title	Role	Notes	Ref.
2013	Let's Go! Dream Team Season 2			
2015	I Can See Your Voice	Participant	Episode 4	
2020	Mr Trot	Contestant	Top 14	
2020	King of Mask Singer	Contestant as "Athletics University Oppa"	Episodes 253–254	
2020–2021	Trot National Festival	Coach		
2021	Law of the Jungle – Stove League	Cast Member		
2021	Chick High Kick	Cast Member	Episode 1–12	
2021	My Neighborhood Class	Cast member		
2021	Designers	Host	with Do Kyung-wan and Park Eun-young	
2021	Immortal Song	Special host		
2022	Chuu Can Do It Season 4	Guest and taekwondo examiner	Hosted by Chuu, who is being examined	

=== Music video appearances ===
Year	Song Title	Artist	Ref.
2022	"Wanna Go Get Some Abalone" (전복 먹으러 갈래)	Young Tak	

== Accolades ==
=== Awards and nominations ===
Name of the award ceremony, year presented, category, nominee of the award, and the result of the nomination
Award ceremony	Year	Category	Nominee / work	Result	Ref.
KBS Entertainment Awards	2020	Rookie Award in Show/Variety Category	Trot National Festival	Nominated	

=== Listicles ===
Name of publisher, year listed, name of listicle, and placement
Publisher	Year	Listicle	Placement	Ref.
Forbes	2021	Korea Power Celebrity	19th	
