= Blood Hunters: Rise of the Hybrids =

- Directed by: Vincent Soberano
- Written by: Vincent Soberano
- Based on: Blood Hunters (2016) by Vince Soberano
- Produced by: Elaine Carriedo Lozano
- Starring: Vincent Soberano; Monsour del Rosario; Sarah Chang
- Cinematography: Miguel Cruz; Takeyuki Onishi
- Edited by: David Benjamin Ignacio
- Music by: Tamara dela Cruz
- Production companies: IndieGo Pictures; RSVP Film Studios; Cinefenio Films
- Distributed by: IndieGo Pictures
- Release dates: November 9, 2019 (United States); November 19, 2020 (Philippines)
- Running time: 70 minutes
- Country: Philippines
- Language: Filipino

Blood Hunters: Rise of the Hybrids is a Philippine fantasy martial arts film directed by Vincent Soberano and is costarred by Soberano and Monsour del Rosario. The feature film is based on the 2016 short film, Blood Hunters.

== Synopsis ==
Blood Hunters: Rise of the Hybrids revolves around a bid of a secret organization called Blood Hunters to kill the Queen of the aswang Maya (Mayling Ng). The aswang are an "underworld species" with the intention of using her blood to revive deceased humans back to life as aswang beings. Former soldier Jun, who injected himself with the queen's blood and is the first hybrid, leads the aswang hybrid army with his minions Gundra (Mekael Turner) and Naga (Temujin Shirzada).

Gabriella Chen (Sara Chang) an aswang hunter, aims to kill the aswang hybrid Naga to avenge her family's death. She was caught in an explosion but was rescued by Max (Ian Ignacio) and Kali (Roxanne Barcelo) who lead her to their group. The group's leader Monte (Monsour Del Rosario) also summoned Bolo (Vincent Soberano), another hunter who injects himself with aswang blood and also lost his family like Gabriella. Realizing that the aswangs are planning an attack, the other aswang hunters launch a preemptive attack on the aswang hybrid lair.

== Cast ==
Feature film

- Monsour del Rosario
- Vincent Soberano
- Sarah Chang
- Ian Ignacio
- Conan Stevens
- Temujin Shirzada
- Roxanne Barcelo

== Short film ==
Blood Hunters: Rise of the Hybrids, a feature film was derived from a short film entitled Blood Hunters by the same film production team. The feature film was described by its director, Vince Soberano as an expanded version of the short film. The story of the film will "pick up" from the short film. The short film was awarded the best short film at the 2016 Cinemax HBO Action Film Competition and the Urban Action Showcase and Expo. The short film featured an all-Filipino cast.

Soberano, also directed the short film remarked that people thought that filming techniques similar to what is used in Hollywood were devised in the making of the short film but said that the production team used cheaper and improvised equipment such as using cigarette boxes as cushion instead of mattresses. He also remarked that the production team can't afford to rent Arri Alexa or Black Magic digital camera systems or to use cable wires for the short film's production due to a limited budget. He attributed the short film's success to what he calls "Filipino ingenuity" and said that the team refused to compromise the film's quality despite time constraints.

The short film was shot entirely in Bacolod and features a group of people labeled as aswang. An all-female cast portrayed the group were characterized by Soberano as a misunderstood and "kinda witches" who has an ability to transform themselves which they do to scare but not kill people. They are depicted as protectors of the forest, scary-looking and vegetarians – not carnivorous like the aswang.

== Feature film ==
=== Production ===
Director Vince Soberano is also the writer and producer of the film and one of the film's starring actors along with Monsour del Rosario. A martial artist himself along with Del Rosario, Soberano made the film to promote awareness on Filipino martial arts. He noted that the fighting method was used in foreign films such as John Wick, Jason Bourne, Frankenstein but said that Filipinos are not aware of its use since it was practiced by Hollywood actors.

==== Concept ====
The film have both fantasy and action elements. Aside from Filipino martial arts, the supernatural creatures known as the aswang will be featured in the film. The beings in the film according to Soberano will have different types of breed. The feature film will have Kumander Jun, a mercenary who injected himself with aswang blood, as protagonist. He characterizes the aswang in the film as beings who used to be predators but are now victims. He cites the phrase Don't judge a book by its cover, remarking that the aswang in his film must not be assumed as killers.

==== Filming ====
The filming of Blood Hunters: Rise of the Hybrids (then with the working title of just Blood Hunters) began in October 2016 in Morong, Bataan. By November 2016 filming was on halt and was scheduled to resume in January 2017. The film's cast will compose of actual practitioners of Filipino Martial Arts. Fight rehearsals were also scheduled in December 2016. Scenes were filmed in a day while rehearsal lasts for a week. The cast rehearsed about 12 hours daily from 10 a.m. to 10 p.m. Soberano said that he has already planned the editing and set designing aspects of the film before working on the set.

The last day of filming was done also in Morong on March 7, 2017.

== Release ==
On March 7, 2017, it was announced that the producers of Blood Hunters: Rise of the Hybrids intend to participate at the 2017 Metro Manila Film Festival. They were reportedly the first to express interest to participate in the annual film festival traditionally held every December, but was not selected to be shown.

Blood Hunters was released on November 19, 2020, in the Philippines as part of the main feature showcase of the 2020 Pista ng Pelikulang Pilipino (PPP). Entries of the PPP was streamed online through the FDCP Channel platform of the Film Development Council of the Philippines.
