= The Bodyguard (2004 film) =

- The cover of the Thailand DVD release of the film
- Directed by: Panna Rittikrai; Petchtai Wongkamlao
- Written by: Petchtai Wongkamlao
- Produced by: Somsak Techaratanaprasert
- Starring: Petchtai Wongkamlao; Pumwaree Yodkamol; Piphat Apiraktanakorn; Tony Jaa
- Cinematography: Nattawut Kittikhun
- Edited by: Thawat Sermsuwittayawong
- Music by: Hip-Pro
- Distributed by: Sahamongkol Film International
- Release date: 21 January 2004
- Running time: 95 minutes
- Country: Thailand
- Languages: Thai; Lao

The Bodyguard (Thai: บอดี้การ์ดหน้าเหลี่ยม lit. 'The Square-faced Bodyguard') is a 2004 wire fu action comedy film written and directed by Thai comedian and actor Petchtai Wongkamlao and featuring martial-arts choreography by Panna Ritikrai. It is followed by the 2007 prequel, The Bodyguard 2.

== Plot ==
After a shootout with dozens of assassins, Wong Kom, bodyguard to Chot Petchpantakarn, the wealthiest man in Asia, finds his client killed.

Chaichol, the son and heir to the family fortune, fires the bodyguard and takes it upon himself to find the killers. He's then ambushed, and the rest of the bodyguard team is wiped out. Chaichol, however, comes out of it alive, and finds himself in a Bangkok slum, living with a volunteer car-accident rescue squad and falling in love with tomboyish Pok.

Meanwhile, Wong Kom is working to clear his name, and stay ahead of the chief villain and his bumbling gang of henchmen.

== Cast ==
- Petchtai Wongkamlao as Wong Kom
- Piphat Apiraktanakorn as Chaichol Petchpantakarn
- Surachai Juntimatorn as Chot Petchpantakarn
- Suthep Prayoonpitak as Choung Petchpantakarn
- Aranya Namwong as Rattana Petchpantakarn
- Pumwaree Yodkamol as Pok
- Apaporn Nakornsawan as Mae Jam
- Wachara Pan-Iom as Songpol
- Yingyong Yodbuangam as Arthit
- Choosak Iamsook as Songpol Gangster No. 1
- Samart Payakaroon as Songpol Gangster No. 2
- Krisranapong Ratchatha as Songpol Gangster No. 3
- Sayan Muangcharoen as Songpol Gangster No. 3
- Tony Jaa as Supermarket fighter / himself (as Panom Yeerum)

=== Casting notes ===
- Petchtai Wongkamlao, a popular Thai comedian, plays the straight man.
- Some of the film's promotional materials imply that this follow-up to Ong-Bak: Muay Thai Warrior starring Tony Jaa. In fact, Tony only has a small (but still memorable) role as an anonymous fighter in a supermarket.
- In addition to Tony Jaa, dozens of Thai celebrities, including sports figures, comedians and musicians, have roles and cameos on the film. Among them are:
  - Surachai Juntimatorn, portraying Chaichol's father, is more popularly known as "Nga Caravan" of the pioneering 1970s songs for life band, Caravan.
  - Yingyong Yodbuangam, who portrayed one of the leaders of the bad guys, is a well-known luk thung singer.
  - Twin-brother boxers Kaokor Galaxy and Khaosai Galaxy, portraying the "twin assassins".
  - Another boxer, Samart Payakaroon, is Songpol Gangster No. 2.
  - Chao Kokaew Prakaykavil na Chiang Mai, a blue-haired fixture on Thai newspaper society pages until her death in 2005, portrays a maid.

== Awards and nominations ==
- Best supporting actress winner, Apaporn Nakornsawan, Thailand National Film Awards, 2005.
