= Kom Chuanchuen =

Thai actor and comedian (1958–2021)

- ค่อม ชวนชื่น
- Born: Akom Preedakul; 5 January 1958; Ban Pong, Ratchaburi, Thailand
- Died: 30 April 2021 (aged 63); Chakri Naruebodindra Medical Institute, Samut Prakan, Thailand
- Other names: Kom Chuan-chuen; Kom; Na Kom (Uncle Kom)
- Occupations: Actor; comedian; YouTuber
- Years active: 1982—2021

Akom Preedakul (Thai: อาคม ปรีดากุล, RTGS: Akhom Pridakun, IPA: [ʔāː.kʰōm prīː.dāː.kūn]; 5 January 1958 – 30 April 2021), known by stage name Kom Chuanchuen (Thai: ค่อม ชวนชื่น, RTGS: Khom Chuanchuen, Thai pronunciation: [kʰɔ̂m t͡ɕʰūa̯n.tɕʰɯ̂ːn]), was a Thai comedian and actor best known from comedic, supporting roles in Thai movies and television.

Originally a nightclub comedian, Kom made a breakthrough in movies after starring in Heavens Seven (2002). He solidified his movie career with a performance in Saep Sanit Sid Saai Naa (2006), and went on starring in more than 80 Thai films such as See How They Run (2006), Sudkate Salateped (2010), Khun Nai Ho (2012), Bikeman Sakkarin Toodmuek (2018), Bikeman 2 (2019) and E Riam Sing (2020). He was also the main cast of the sketch comedy show Borisat Ha Mai Jumkud between 2015 and 2021.

Despite being illiterate, Kom was highly praised for his ability to understand scripts and unique improvisation skill which led up to working opportunities with a vast array of directors such as Poj Arnon, Rergchai Poungpetch, and Nawapol Thamrongrattanarit. At the time of his death, Kom was one of the most respected and sought-after Thai comedians.

After his death, Suneta House's Krungsri Auto ad series, in which he participated, won the Cannes Lions Bronze Award in the Entertainment category from Cannes, France.

== Early life and nightclub comedian career ==
Kom was born in Ratchaburi Province to a Likay theatre worker family. Due to family circumstances requiring travel with the theatre, he was forced to quit formal education at grade 1. He worked in a Likay theatre for several years, taking several roles such as a joker and taphon drummer which was the basis of his comedy career like many of his contemporaries.

Kom later moved from his hometown to Bangkok with childhood comedian friend Bamroe Pong-insi, later known as Note Choenyim. Their time in Bangkok was a hard one, they had to rotate their only pair of trousers and were oftentimes homeless. He worked with Note in Note's comedy troupe Choenyim for some time, performing in nightclubs around Bangkok before splitting up due to incompatible comedy style. He was later invited to join Chuanchuen troupe.

== Transition into movies ==
Kom's first foray into movies was the film Art Fundamental in 1996. But his breakthrough role came later in 2002 after he starred as Juk Biewsakul, a brash grenadier who dearly loves his mom in the film Heavens Seven which became successful and gave him national recognition.

Due to a decline in nightclub comedy shows in Thailand, Kom transitioned more to a movie role. He formed a working relationship with the director Rergchai Poungpetch, starred in the films such as Pa Yuk Rai Sai Na, Saep Sanit Sid Saai Naa and Sudkate Salateped which cemented Kom's role as a supporting, often scenes-stealing role in Thai cinema. This partnership continued until Kom's death. Mainly a comedic actor, he also played more serious role such as a homophobic former soldier in Khun Nai Ho and an ageing musician in Nawapol Thamrongrattanarit's Die Tomorrow.

== Illness and death ==
Previously diagnosed with diabetes and stroke, Kom was tested positive for COVID-19 on 10 April 2021 and was hospitalized two days later. On 29 April 2021, his condition became critical as he suffered organ failures and was at risk of cardiac arrest. On 30 April 2021 Kom was confirmed dead due to complications from COVID-19, making him the first Thai comedian and actor who died from COVID-19 during the third wave of the COVID-19 pandemic in Thailand.
