= Ghost House (2017 film) =

2017 film

- Film poster
- Directed by: Rich Ragsdale
- Screenplay by: Kevin O'Sullivan; Jason Chase Tyrrell
- Story by: Rich Ragsdale; Kevin Ragsdale
- Produced by: Veronica Radaelli; Kevin Ragsdale; Kulthep Narula; Rachvin Narula
- Starring: Scout Taylor-Compton; James Landry Hébert
- Edited by: Jay Gartland
- Music by: Rich Ragsdale
- Release date: 21 July 2017
- Running time: 89 min
- Country: United States
- Language: English

Ghost House is a 2017 American supernatural horror film directed by Rich Ragsdale.

== Plot ==
A young couple go on an adventurous vacation to Thailand only to find themselves haunted by a malevolent spirit after naively disrespecting a Ghost House.

== Cast ==
- Scout Taylor-Compton as Julie
- James Landry Hébert as Jim
- Mark Boone Junior as Reno
- Russell Geoffrey Banks as Robert
- Wen-Chu Yang as Watabe
- Michael S. New as Gogo
- Rich Lee Gray as Billy
- Elana Krausz as Gwen
- Kevin Ragsdale as Cal
