= Russell Geoffrey Banks =

British actor

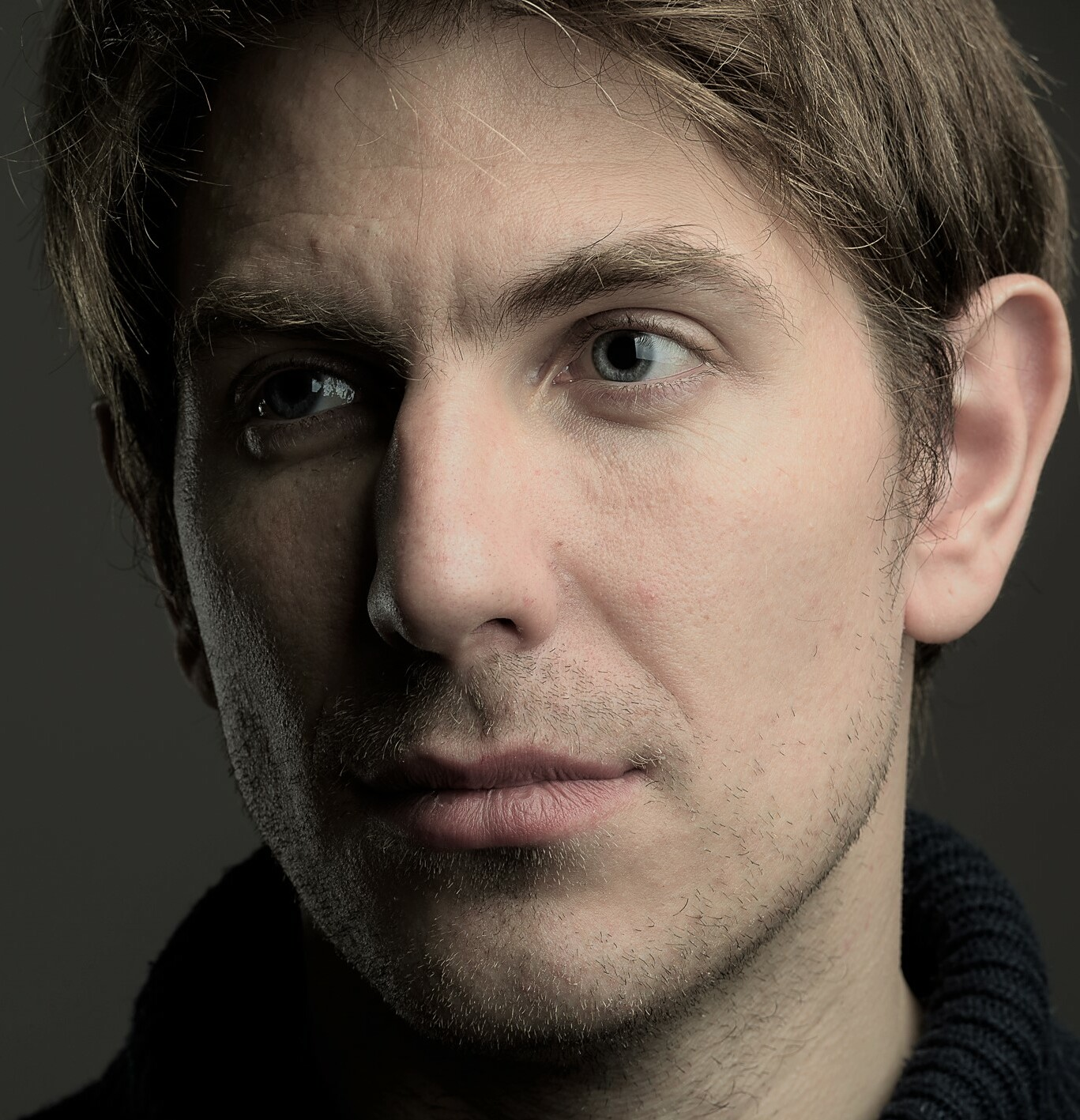
- Banks in 2017
- Occupations: Film actor; screenwriter
- Years active: 2010–present
- Awards: 2017 Best Actor at Fright Night Film Festival
- Website: russellgeoffreybanks.com

Russell Geoffrey Banks is a British actor and screenwriter.

== Early life ==
Banks took up acting at a young age, after dealing with dyslexia and leaving school at age 15.

== Career ==
In 2017, he co-wrote and starred as the titular character in Who's Watching Oliver (2017), for which he won a Fright Night Film Fest Best Actor Award in 2017. He has had notable supporting roles in the films Ghost House (2017), the Indian film Vishwaroopam II (2018), and Bambi: The Reckoning (2025).

== Filmography ==
Title	Year	Role	Notes
2010	Darling	Child Kidnapper	Indian film
2010	Virudhagiri	Chief Police	Indian film
2011	United Six	News Reporter	
2011	Oba: The Last Samurai	U.S Solder	
2012	The Impossible	Newly Wed	
2013	The Mark: Redemption	Techie	
2013	Dragonwolf	Markus	
2014	Tekken 2: Kazuya's Revenge	Jimmy the Thief	
2014	Goodnight, Gloria	Clayton	
2014	Cam2Cam	Russell Adkins	
2014	Pernicious	Colin	
2015	I Love NY	Mike	
2016	I Love You Two	Terrence	
2016	A Man Will Rise	Cowboy Gangster	
2017	King Arthur and the Knights of the Round Table	Mordred	
2017	Ghost House	Robert	
2017	Vishwaroopam II	Jim	Indian film
2017	Loov: Là Où On Va	Ben	French film
2017	Who's Watching Oliver	Oliver	also writer
2025	Bambi: The Reckoning	Andrew	
