= Tang Wong =

2013 Thai film

- Film poster
- Directed by: Kongdej Jaturanrasmee
- Written by: Kongdej Jaturanrasmee
- Produced by: Soros Sukhum; Kongdej Jaturanrasmee; Piyaluck Mahatanasab
- Starring: Sompob Sittiajarn; Siripat Kuhavichanun; Nathasit Kotimanuswanich; Anawat Patanawanichkul
- Cinematography: Umpornpol Yugala
- Edited by: Kamontorn Eakwattanakij; Manussa Vorasingha
- Music by: Chaibundit Peuchponsub; Apichai Tragoolpadetgrai; Dome Dussadeechettakul
- Production company: Song Sound Production
- Release date: 29 August 2013
- Running time: 83 minutes
- Country: Thailand
- Language: Thai

Tang Wong (Thai: ตั้งวง) is a 2013 Thai indie coming-of-age drama film directed by Kongdej Jaturanrasmee. It tells the story of a group of secondary school students struggling to learn a traditional dance as an offering for the local spirit shrine, which takes place against the backdrop of the 2010 Thai political crisis. The film won the Best Film, Best Director, Best Screenplay and Best Supporting Actor awards at the 2013 Thailand National Film Association Awards.

== Cast ==
- Sompob Sittiajarn
- Siripat Kuhavichanun
- Nathasit Kotimanuswanich
- Anawat Patanawanichkul
