= Tom Yum Goong 2 =

- Thai poster for Tom Yum Goong 2
- Directed by: Prachya Pinkaew
- Written by: Eakisit Thairaat
- Produced by: Prachya Pinkaew; Panna Rittikrai; Sukanya Vongsthapat
- Starring: Tony Jaa; Rza; Rhatha Phongam; Petchtai Wongkamlao; Yanin Vismitananda
- Cinematography: Teerawat Rujenatham
- Edited by: Manussas Worasingh; Ratchapun Pisutsintop; Chalerm Wongpim; Wichit Wattananon; Richara Phanomrat
- Music by: Terdsak Janpan
- Distributed by: Sahamongkolfilm International
- Release date: 23 October 2013 (Thailand)
- Running time: 103 minutes
- Country: Thailand
- Languages: Thai; English
- Budget: $12-15 million
- Box office: $2.2 million

Tom Yum Goong 2 (Thai: ต้มยำกุ้ง 2) also known in the US as The Protector 2, in the UK as Warrior King 2 and in Germany as Return of the Warrior is a 2013 Thai martial arts film directed by Prachya Pinkaew and written by Eakisit Thairaat. It is the sequel to Pinkaew's Tom-Yum-Goong with Tony Jaa and Petchtai Wongkamlao reprising their roles.

== Plot ==
Kham (Tony Jaa) has resumed a quiet village life with his "brother"/elephant, Khon, back in Thailand. Job, an oddball who loves playing with electrical devices, has lived in the village for some time and has earned the trust of the locals. Unknown to Kham, he's an agent of an arms dealer known as Mr. LC (RZA). A fan of Kham's exploits, LC had Job keep tabs on Kham without his knowledge. Things change for Kham when a merchant, Suchart Vilawandei (Adinan Buntanaporn), wants to buy Khon, but Kham refuses to sell Khon. Suchart gives his business card to Kham in case he changes his mind.

While eating with the local villagers, Kham feels something is wrong and returns home to find that Job has been beaten and Khon has been taken by Suchart. Using the business card that Suchart gave him, Kham goes to Suchart's home to get answers but only finds that Suchart has been killed moments earlier. Suchart's two nieces, martial artists Ping-ping (Yanin "Jeeja" Vismitananda) and Sue-sue (Theerada Kittiseriprasert) arrive and believe that Kham must be responsible. The two attack him, but he evades and escapes; the authorities are alerted and the police give chase.

While running from the law, Kham encounters Mark, who fakes being assaulted and allows Kham to escape. Later on, they secretly meet to learn more about the situation. Mark himself is in Thailand on a job for Interpol investigating a recent terrorist plot involving the peace talks between East Katana and West Katana in Bangkok.

Kham is attacked by Suchart's nieces as well as a biker gang. Kham fights through them and faces a small group of LC's fighters. LC himself is a great admirer of martial arts and has gathered his own personal group of fighters ranked according to their strength. LC has his second-strongest fighter, No. 2, take on Kham, while the girls are also interfering. No. 2 kills Sue-sue, leaving Ping-ping to grieve. Kham loses the fight to No. 2 due to a needle stuck to his neck from the fight with Ping-ping. No. 2 realizes that he only won the fight because Kham was handicapped, and takes him to LC.

At LC's base, Kham finds his elephant and also discovers that Job is a traitor. Kham's enemies tie a specially made remote-controlled electrical device to shock Kham as well as Khon at the same time every time Kham disobeys. LC wants Kham to join him and uses the device to force Kham to help him assassinate a political figure related to the peace talks. LC also brands Kham on his chest as his fighter No. 1.

Mark is suspected of foul play by other Interpol agents. After he fails to capture Kham, he is told to go home. However, Mark finds Kham and helps him remove the electrical device. Mark also encounters Ping-ping and takes her to examine her uncle's body at the coroner's office, where it is explained to her that Suchart was killed by three powerful combo punches, the same method of killing that happened to Sue-sue. Ping-ping realizes that Kham was not the killer but rather No. 2.

LC, Job, No. 2, and Kham all go to a country temple to help war profiteers assassinate both leaders at the Katana peace talks to incite war and sell more weapons. Kham infiltrates the temple and fights against all of LC's men and No. 2. Kham and Ping-ping team up to fight against their mutual enemies. Ping-ping ignites an entire floor filled with gasoline in an attempt to burn No. 2, but No. 2 avoids the explosions and fire and finds Kham.

Kham, fighting one level below Ping-ping, takes advantage of the fire, setting his own shoes on fire to using them to defeat his enemies. They in turn copy him. Kham then fights No. 2 again, this time further below, on the train tracks. The two fight over a live rail and take advantage of the electricity to shock each other while fighting. Kham knocks out No. 2 and confronts LC. To Kham's surprise, LC is a highly trained martial artist and has marked himself as No. 0. The fight is short because both men fall, and LC is knocked out.

Kham recovers and finds Khon. He tells Mark that there's a bomb threat, and Mark tries to explain this to his superiors but they won't listen to him. Mark decides to scream out that there's a bomb and it scares everyone away. Kham finds Job, and the two discover that Khon's tusks have been cut down and replaced with prosthetic tusks that are rigged to explode. Kham tries to find a way to save Khon, but LC and No. 2 interfere.

No. 2 and LC take on Kham in a two-on-one fight while Kham is busy holding Khon's tusks to prevent them from falling out and exploding. With the help of both Ping-ping and Mark, No. 2 is defeated, and LC is killed after Kham releases the tusks and kicks them away at LC. The explosion kills LC and knocks both Kham and Khon over the cliff and into the ocean, but they survive.

== Cast ==
- Tony Jaa as Kham
- Petchtai Wongkamlao as Sergeant Mark
- Marrese Crump as No. 2
- Yanin "Jeeja" Vismistananda as Ping-ping
- Rhatha Phongam as No. 20
- RZA as Mr. LC/No. 00
- Kazu Patrick Tang as No. 18
- David Ismalone as No. 24
- Theerada Kittisiriprasert as Sue Sue
- Jawed El Berni as The Spy/No. 85

== Production ==
Tom Yum Goong 2 went into production in August 2011. The script was written by Eakasit Thairaat who previously had written scripts of the Thai films 13 Beloved (2006), Body (2007) and Long Weekend (2013).

The film is shot in 3-D with action scenes directed by Weerapon Phumatfon and Somjai Janmoontree.

== Release ==
The film was released in Thailand on 23 October 2013. The film debuted at number one in the box office in Thailand grossing US$684,406 in its opening weekend. The film grossed a total of US$1,776,546 in Thailand. Worldwide the film grossed US$3,302,463.

== Reception ==
Film Business Asia gave the film a rating of seven out of ten, stating, "In many respects TYG2 dishes up the usual Jaa formula — 90% action and 10% story/characterisation — with the action coming fast and furious, especially when the script basically gives up any pretence at coherency halfway through. The only differences are that Jaa abandons his usual claim to fame of not using wire-work or visual effects, and the film is lighter on the masochism that has permeated most of his work." The South China Morning Post gave the film a rating of three out of five, noting that the film "overcomes a clumsy, complicated set-up and unimpressive 3-D to deliver the requisite thrills." On Metacritic it holds a score of 45 out of 100 based on reviews from 10 critics. On Rotten Tomatoes the film has a score of 17% based on 23 critic reviews.
