= Fireball (film) =

- Film poster
- Directed by: Thanakorn Pongsuwan
- Written by: Thanakorn Pongsuwan; Kiat Songsanant; Taweewat Wantha; Adirek Wattaleela
- Produced by: Adirek Wattaleela
- Starring: Preeti Barameeanat; Khanutra Chuchuaysuwan; Kumpanat Oungsoongnern
- Cinematography: Teerawat Rujintham; Wardhana Vunchuplou; Suntipong Waiwong
- Edited by: Saknakorn Neteharn; Thanakorn Pongsuwan; Adirek Wattaleela
- Music by: Giant Wave
- Distributed by: Icon Film Distribution (2011)
- Release date: 29 January 2009
- Running time: 88 minutes
- Country: Thailand
- Language: Thai
- Budget: Unknown
- Box office: Unknown

Fireball (Thai: ท้าชน pronounced "Tar Chon") is a 2009 Thai martial arts action film. The film was directed by Thanakorn Pongsuwan and combines Muay Thai with basketball.

== Plot ==
Tai, a young man arrested on a crime charge, is discharged thanks to his twin brother Tan's dogged help. After being set free, he finds Tan in a coma with severe injuries. Tan's girlfriend, Pang, tells Tai that his brother got involved in some risky business to raise money to fight Tai's case. Tai feels guilty that his problems brought his brother trouble. He then traces what happened to Tan, which ultimately leads him into illegal basketball gambling. Tai wants to find out who is behind this gambling and why his brother was beaten unconscious. He finally joins the "Fireball" team, a team which belongs to Hia Den and whose players include Singha, Kay, Ik, and Muek. In order to uncover the truth, Tai trades many things-possibly even his life.

== Cast ==
- Preeti Barameeanat as Tai - Tan
- Khanutra Chuchuaysuwan as Pang
- Kumpanat Oungsoongnern as Muk
- Phutharit Prombandal as Den
- 9 Million Sam as Zing
- Rattanaballang Tohssawat as Tun (credited as Arucha Tosawat)
- Kannut Samerjai-Yi

== Reception ==
The film's director won the Guru Prize for Most Energetic Film at the Fant-Asia Film Festival, and was tied with Vampire Girl vs. Frankenstein Girl. The film received a mixed reception from film critics.
