= Who's Watching Oliver =

2017 film by Richie Moore

- Poster
- Directed by: Richie Moore
- Written by: Raimund Huber; Richie Moore; Russell Geoffrey Banks
- Produced by: Raimund Huber; Aki Komine; Chariyawan Tavoranon
- Starring: Russell Geoffrey Banks; Sara Malakul Lane; Margaret Roche
- Cinematography: Richie Moore
- Edited by: Jesse Maddox
- Production company: Motionpictures
- Distributed by: Gravitas Ventures
- Release dates: February 26, 2017 (Vancouver Badass Film Festival); July 3, 2018
- Running time: 87 minutes
- Countries: United States; Thailand
- Language: English

Who's Watching Oliver is a 2017 romance horror film directed by Richie Moore in his feature film debut. It was written by Moore, Raimund Huber and Russell Geoffrey Banks. The film stars Banks, Sara Malakul Lane and Margaret Roche.

== Plot ==
Oliver is sent to Thailand by his mother and ordered to rape and murder women there. He meets Sophia at an amusement park in hopes of finding love and a new outlook on life.

== Cast ==
- Russell Geoffrey Banks as Oliver
- Sara Malakul Lane as Sophia
- Margaret Roche as Mama

== Production ==
In an interview at PopHorror, Banks reflected that Huber proposed the character of Oliver to be like Forrest Gump, Crispin Glover and Patrick Bateman. The film is Moore's feature film debut, which he claims was Banks' initial concept.

== Release ==
The film was released July 3, 2018 and distributed by Gravitas Ventures.

== Reception ==
On the review aggregator website Rotten Tomatoes, 88% of 8 critics' reviews are positive, with an average rating of 7.3/10.

A review at Dread Central praised the film, stating it is "not only recommended, but required." Karli Lawson at PopHorror said it is a "disturbing film with plenty of gore." Starburst Magazine called it a "fascinating essay on the everyday life of a serial killer." Film critic Daniel M. Kimmel stated "this is clearly not a movie for everyone, with the nudity, violence, and just plain insanity" scoring it 3 out of 5. Patrick King at Cultured Vultures called it "one of the better horror movies I’ve seen this year." Vicki Woods at Morbidly Beautiful said it is a "film that will bring out serious emotions." Bloody Disgusting claims that the "themes explored in this film [...] have certainly been done before." Roger Moore at Movie Nation scored it 1 out of 4, calling it "torture porn."

Oliver is listed on WhatCulture's 10 Most Twisted Characters In Modern Horror Movies.
