= Leo Putt =

Thai singer and actor

Putthipong Sriwat (Thai: พุฒิพงศ์ ศรีวัฒน์), more popularly known as Leo Putt (ลีโอ พุฒ), is a Thai singer and actor. His films include Fake, Dynamite Warrior, and The Sperm.

He has Thai-dubbed for Tobey Maguire as Peter Parker/Spider-Man in Sam Raimi's Spider-Man trilogy.

== Filmography ==
- Goodbye Summer (1996)
- Fake (2003)
- The Story of X-Circle (2004)
- Dynamite Warrior (2006)
- The Sperm (2007)
- Opapatika (2007)
