= Dark Side Romance =

- The Thai theatrical poster.
- Directed by: Prachya Pinkaew
- Written by: Dulyasit Niyomkul; Nattiya Sirakornwilai
- Produced by: Adirek Wattaleela
- Starring: Tat Na Takuatung; Kullasatree Siripongpreeda
- Cinematography: Somchai Kittikul
- Edited by: Duangsamorn Luksanakoset
- Music by: Jingle Bell
- Distributed by: R.S. Film
- Release date: 29 September 1995
- Running time: 112 minutes
- Country: Thailand
- Language: Thai

Dark Side Romance (Thai: เกิดอีกที ต้องมีเธอ or Goet iik thii tawng mii theu) is a 1995 Thai romantic fantasy film directed by Prachya Pinkaew.

== Plot ==
After a car accident, the spirits of Tan (Tat Na Takuatung and Peang (Kullasatree Siripongpreeda) become trapped in a dangerous limbo, awaiting the chance to be reborn.

== Cast ==
- Tat Na Takuatung as Tan
- Kullasatree Siripongpreeda as Peang
- Chokchai Charoensuk
