= Tony Jaa =

Thai martial artist and actor (born 1976)

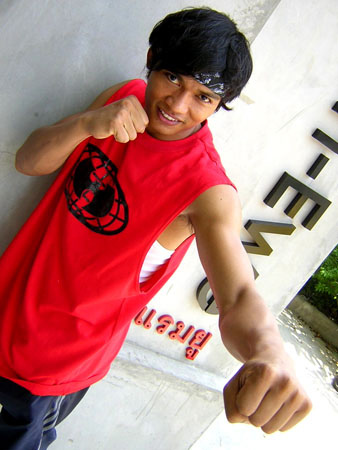
- Tony Jaa in 2005
- Born: February 5, 1976 (age 50); Surin, Thailand
- Native name: จา พนม
- Other names: Jaa Phanom; Phanom Yeerum; Thatchakon Yiram
- Height: 1.72 m (5 ft 8 in)
- Years active: 1994–present

Other information
- Occupation: Actor; martial artist; choreographer; stuntman; director
- Spouse: Piyarat Chotiwat (m. 2011)
- Children: 2

Tatchakorn Yeerum (born 1976), formerly Phanom Yeerum, better known internationally as Tony Jaa, is a Thai martial artist, actor, action choreographer, stuntman, and director. Known for his explosive martial arts stunt work, Jaa had his breakthrough in 2003 with Ong-Bak, which earned him international recognition and spawned two sequels.

Jaa began training in Muay Thai at age 8, and fought at temple fairs as a Muay Thai fighter during his time in surin when he was discovered by filmmaker Panna Rittikrai. He worked as a stuntman for Muay Thai Stunt for 14 years, before making the transition to acting. His first lead role was as Ting in Ong-Bak (2003), which earned him a Star Entertainment Award. He went on to star in the prequels Ong Bak 2 (2008) and Ong Bak 3 (2010), both of which he directed. In 2005, he portrayed Kham in Tom-Yum-Goong, a role he reprised in the sequel, Tom Yum Goong 2 (2013). Furious 7 (2015) marked his first English-speaking role, and SPL II: A Time for Consequences (2015) marked his Hong Kong debut. His other notable films include XXX: Return of Xander Cage, Paradox (both 2017), Master Z: Ip Man Legacy (2018), Triple Threat (2019), and Detective Chinatown 3 (2021).

Jaa's films have grossed over $2.7 billion worldwide. Widely considered one of the greatest martial arts stars in the history of cinema, Jaa is credited with helping establish the Thai action genre worldwide and popularising the Thai combat systems of Muay Thai, Muay Boran, and "Muay Kotchasaan" (a fighting style Jaa and Rittikrai developed in 2005).

== Early life ==
Jaa was born on 5 February 1976 and raised in a rural area in Surin Province to Rin Saipetch and Thongdee Yeerum. In his youth, he watched films by Bruce Lee and Jackie Chan at temple fairs, which inspired him to learn martial arts. He practiced the techniques in his father's rice paddy. "What they [Lee and Chan] did was so beautiful, so heroic that I wanted to do it too," Jaa told Time in a 2004 interview. "I practiced until I could do the move exactly as I had seen the masters do it." Jaa was also inspired by Jet Li and Donnie Yen.

Jaa began training in Muay Thai at his local temple at 10 years old. According to Jaa, he fought professionally as a Muay Thai fighter when filmmaker Panna Rittikrai saw him and asked him if he would like to do stunts in one of his films. Panna had instructed Jaa to attend Maha Sarakham College of Physical Education in Maha Sarakham Province from which he graduated with a bachelor's degree. His early martial arts experience included Taekwondo, Muay Thai, Muay Boran, and Krabi-Krabong, with an emphasis on gymnastics and track and field. His films have showcased various other martial arts styles, such as Kung-Fu, Judo, Aikido, Silat, and Jiu-Jitsu.

== Career ==
=== Stunt work ===
Tony Jaa initially worked as a stuntman for Muay Thai Stunt for 14 years, appearing in many of Rittikrai's films. He doubled for Sammo Hung when the martial-arts movie actor made a commercial for an energy drink that required him to grasp an elephant's tusks and somersault onto the elephant's back. He was also a stunt double in the Thai television series Insee Daeng (Red Eagle).

=== 2003–2008: International success ===
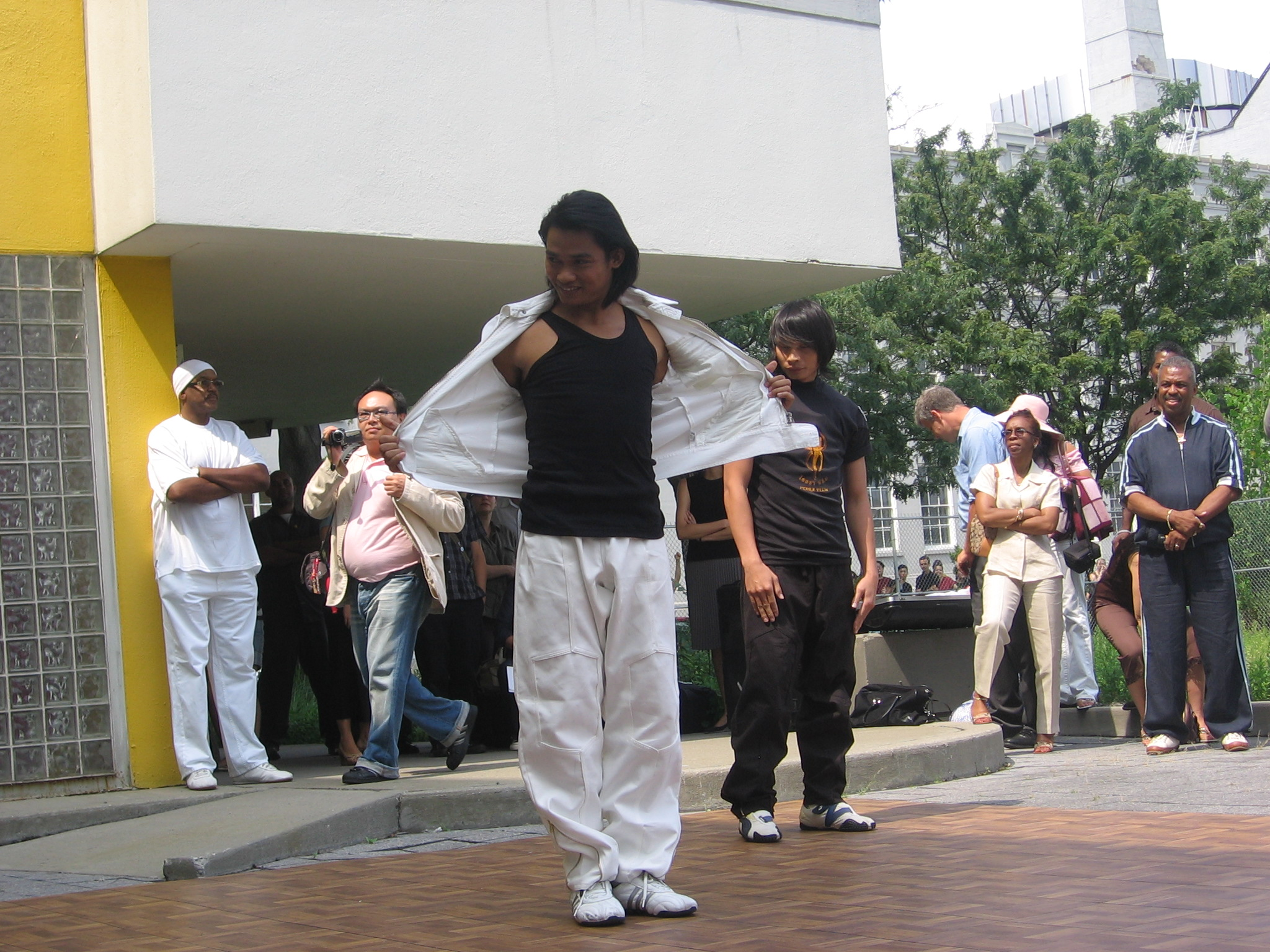
Jaa in 2006

Together, Panna and Jaa developed an interest in Muay Boran, the predecessor of muay thai and worked and trained for four years at the art with the intention of developing a film about it. Eventually they were able to put together a short film showing what Jaa could do with the help of instructor Grandmaster Mark Harris. One of the people they showed it to was producer-director Prachya Pinkaew.

This led to Ong-Bak in 2003, Jaa's break-out role as a leading man. Jaa did all the stunts without mechanical assistance or computer-generated effects and it showcased his style of extreme acrobatics and speedy, dance-like moves. Injuries suffered in the filming included a ligament injury and a sprained ankle. One scene in the film involved fighting with another actor while his own trousers were on fire. "I actually got burned," he said in a 2005 interview. "I really had to concentrate because once my pants were on fire the flames spread upwards very fast and burnt my eyebrows, my eyelashes and my nose. Then we had to do a couple more takes to get it right."

His second major movie was Tom-Yum-Goong (The Protector in the US), named after tom yum soup, which included a style of Muay Thai that imitates elephants.

In August 2006, he was in New York to promote the US release of The Protector, including an appearance at the Museum of the Moving Image.

By mid 2000s, dubbed versions of Jaa's films gained international recognition through theatrical releases, television broadcasts, and on-demand platforms. His films were noted to be innovative productions featuring fast paced martial arts choreography and stunts. It established him as a global action icon.

Sahamongkol Film International advertised that Tony Jaa's third film would be called Sword or Daab Atamas, about the art of Thai two-sword fighting (daab song mue), with a script by Prapas Chonsalanont. But due to a falling out between Prachya and Jaa, which neither has publicly commented on, Sword was cancelled.

In March 2006, it was reported that there would be a sequel to Ong-Bak titled Ong Bak 2. Directed by and starring Jaa, it was released in December 2008.

Jaa's films captured the attention of his hero, Jackie Chan, who asked director Brett Ratner to cast Jaa in Rush Hour 3. "I gave the director videos of Jaa because I think he is the most well-rounded of all action stars," Chan told the Associated Press. "The director liked him a lot," Chan said. However, Jaa mentioned that he is unable to participate in the film because of scheduling conflicts with Ong Bak 2.

While Jaa and Amogelang were working on Ong Bak 2, director Prachya Pinkaew and action choreographer Panna Rittikrai were working on Chocolate, starring a female martial artist, Nicharee Vismistananda and released 6 February 2008. Jaa had been cast in a small role in a third installment of the King Naresuan film series directed by Chatrichalerm Yukol, although the film was ultimately cancelled. Ong Bak 3 was released in 2010 and provides a conclusion to this franchise trilogy.

=== 2010–present: Career expansion ===
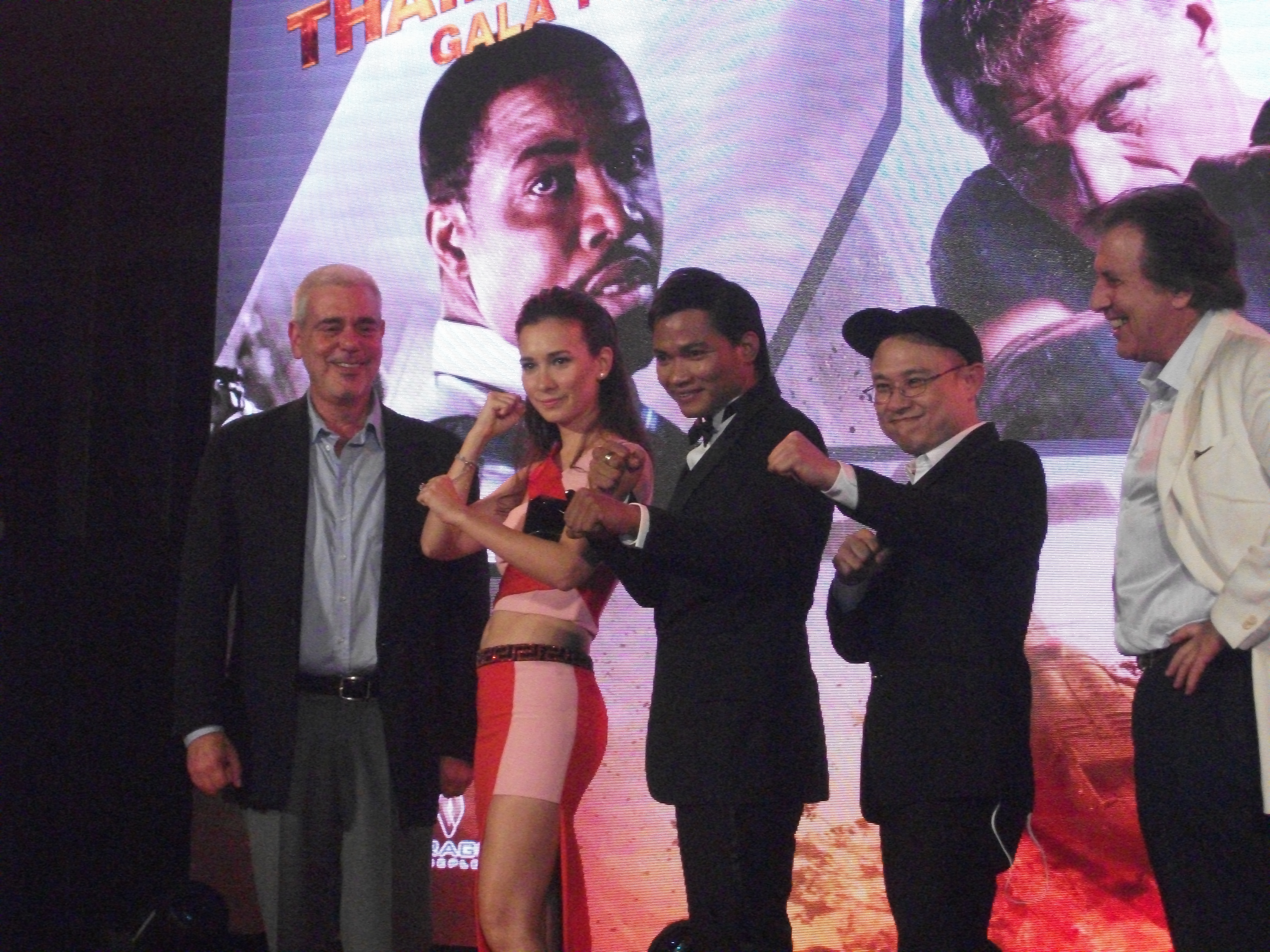
Tony Jaa (center) at a press conference for Skin Trade in 2015

Jaa and Panna Rittikrai co-directed Ong Bak 3.

After leaving the monastery, Jaa accepted a deal with Sahamongkol film company. He filmed Tom Yum Goong 2 (2013) for them, with Chocolate star Jija Yanin in a major role too, the first time Jaa has shared the big screen with another international martial arts star. Director Prachya Pinkaew and choreographer Panna Rittikrai also returned for this film.

In 2013, Jaa teamed up with Dolph Lundgren in the Thai western-comedy A Man Will Rise (which remains unfinished) and in 2014 in Lundgren's pet project Skin Trade. Jaa then co-starred in the blockbuster action film Furious 7 (2015), produced by and starring Vin Diesel and directed by James Wan. Jaa also teamed up with fellow actors Louis Koo and Wu Jing in Hong Kong-Chinese action film SPL II: A Time for Consequences (2015).

Jaa was briefly attached to the remake of Kickboxer: Vengeance. However, in November 2014, it was announced that he had exited the project. Jaa's most recent project was co-starring with Diesel again in XXX: Return of Xander Cage, directed by D. J. Caruso and released in January 2017.

In October 2016, Jaa co-starred with Koo again in Paradox, the third installment of the SPL series.

He was inducted into the Martial Arts History Museum Hall of Fame in 2017.

== Personal life ==
Jaa married his longtime girlfriend Piyarat Chotiwattananont on 3 May 2012. The couple have two daughters.

In February 2026, it was reported that Jaa had been diagnosed with stage 3 gallbladder cancer a couple of years prior.

== Filmography ==
=== Film ===
Year	Title	Role	Notes	
1994	Spirited Killer		Supporting role	
1996	Hard Gun		Supporting role	
1996	Mission Hunter 2 (Battle Warrior)		Supporting role	
1997	Mortal Kombat Annihilation		Stunt double: Robin Shou	
2001	Nuk leng klong yao		Supporting role	
2003	Ong-Bak	Ting		
2004	The Bodyguard	Himself	Cameo	
2005	Tom-Yum-Goong	Kham		
2007	The Bodyguard 2	Himself	Cameo	
2008	Ong Bak 2	Tien	Action choreographer, director and stunt coordinator	
2010	Ong Bak 3	Tien	Action choreographer, director and stunt coordinator	
2013	Tom Yum Goong 2	Kham		
2014	Skin Trade	Tony Vitayakul	Direct-to-DVD	
2015	Furious 7	Kiet	Hollywood debut, 1st time working with Vin Diesel and Jason Statham, and also 1st and only time working with Dwayne Johnson, Ronda Rousey, Paul Walker, Cody Walker and the rest of the cast members	
2015	SPL II: A Time for Consequences	Chatchai	Hong Kong debut	
2016	Never Back Down: No Surrender	Himself	Cameo	
2017	XXX: Return of Xander Cage	Talon	2nd Hollywood film, 2nd time working with Vin Diesel and also 1st and only time working with Donnie Yen, Michael Bisping, Deepika Padukone, Kris Wu and the rest of the cast members	
2017	Paradox	Tak		
2017	Gong Shou Dao	Master Jaa	Short film	
2018	Master Z: Ip Man Legacy	Sadi the Warrior		
2019	Triple Threat	Payu		
2020	Jiu Jitsu	Keung		
2020	Monster Hunter	The Hunter		
2021	Detective Chinatown 3	Jack Jaa	Thai dubbing in somescene and some part of Thai version	
2023	Expend4bles	Decha	3rd Hollywood film and 2nd time working with Jason Statham	
2024	Striking Rescue	Bai An	AI himself voice from original to Thai voice or Dubbling by himself in somescene and some part of Thai version	
2027	Ong Bak 4	Tien	Filming	
TBA	A Man Will Rise			Abandoned; director

=== Television ===
Year	Title	Role	Notes
1998	Red Eagle อินทรีแดง (2541)		Stunt double: Red Eagle, uncredited
2015	Sze U Tonight		With Simon Yam & Wu Jing
2024	Detective Chinatown	Jack Jaa	Recurring (Season 2), 3 Episodes

=== Singles ===
Year	Title	Ref
2017	"Lui He Lui" ลุยเฮลุย (GROUNDBREAKING)	

=== Music videos ===
Year	Artist	Title	Role
2004	Tragédie (duo)	"Je Reste Ghetto"	Muay Thai

=== Video games ===
Year	Title	Role	Notes
2005	Tom Yum Goong: The Game	Kham	Voice

== Awards and nominations ==
Year	Awards	Category	Work	Outcome
2003	Star Entertainment Awards	Actor in Leading Role of the Year	Ong-Bak	Won
2004	Suphannahong National Film Awards	Best Actor	Ong-Bak	Nominated
2005	Suphannahong National Film Awards	Honorary Award	Tom-Yum-Goong	Won
2006	Online Film Critics Society Awards	Best Breakthrough Performance	Ong-Bak	Nominated
2008	Top Awards	Motion Picture of the Year	Ong Bak 2	Won
2009	Nine Entertain Awards	Motion Picture of the Year	Ong Bak 2	Won
2009	Chalermthai Awards	Motion Picture of the Year	Ong Bak 2	Nominated
2009	Suphannahong National Film Awards	Best Actor	Ong Bak 2	Nominated
2010	Top Awards	Actor in Leading Role of the Year	Ong Bak 3	Nominated
2011	Deauville Asian Film Festival	Best Actor	Ong Bak 3	Nominated

== See also ==
- Panna Rittikrai
- Muay Thai Stunt
