= Pongpat Wachirabunjong =

Thai actor and singer (born 1961)

- พงษ์พัฒน์ วชิรบรรจง
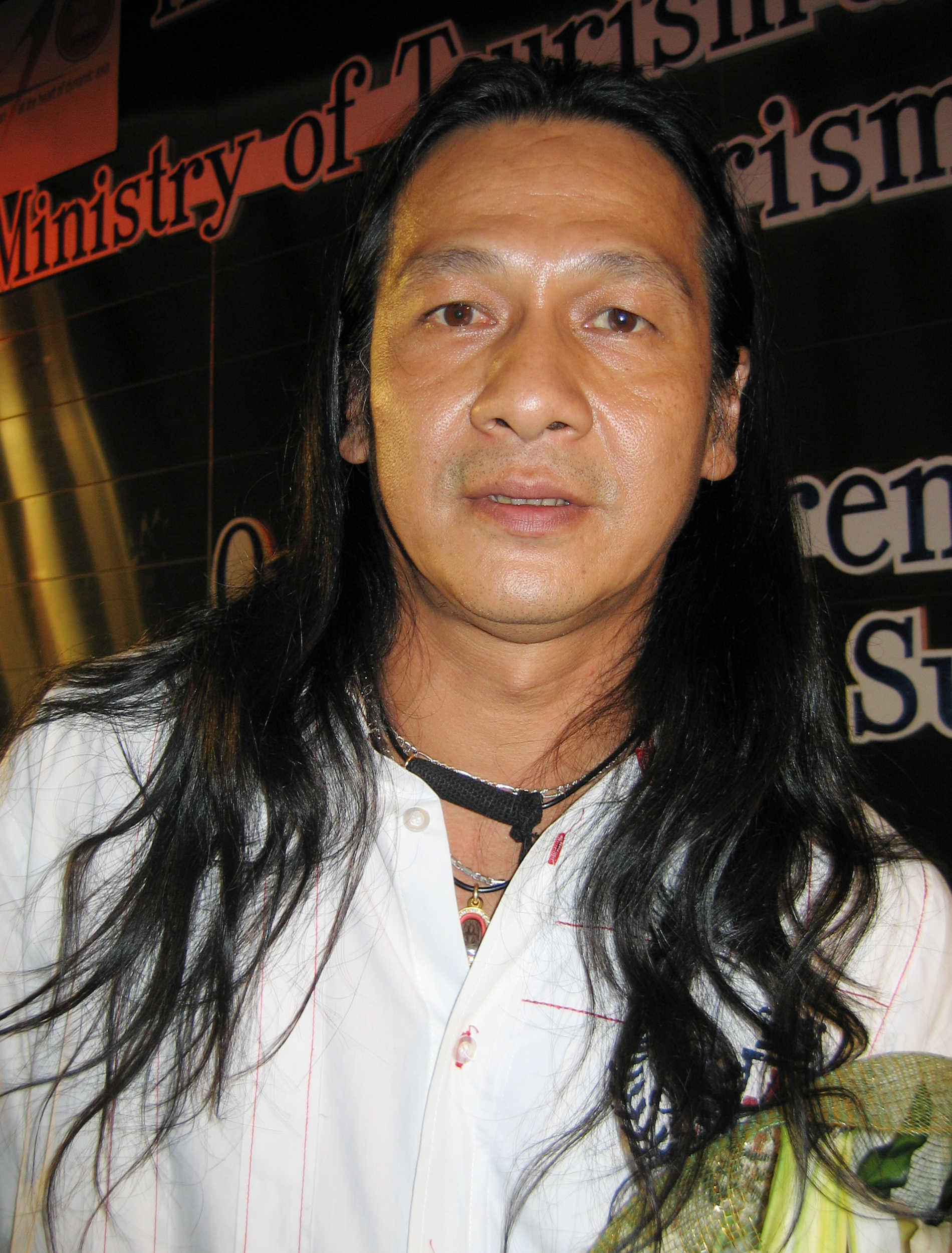
- Pongpat at the 2007 Bangkok International Film Festival.
- Born: 2 September 1961 (age 64); Kamphaeng Phet, Thailand
- Occupations: Actor; singer; film director; series director and producer

Pongpat Wachirabunjong (Thai: พงษ์พัฒน์ วชิรบรรจง; RTGS: Phongphat Wachirabanchong) is a Thai singer, actor, film director and TV series director and producer.

He graduated in bachelor in health of physical education from Srinakharinwirot University.

He is well known in Thailand for his role in the action films Heaven's Seven and Seven Street Fighters.

In addition to his film roles, he has starred in many lakorns (Thai soap operas), and is a popular singer.

Pongpat made his debut as a director in 2007 with the critically acclaimed drama film, Me ... Myself.

== Filmography ==
=== As actor ===
Film

| Year | Title | Role |
|---|---|---|
| 1990 | Tong Plon (Bank-Robbers) | Ble |
| 1991 | Mah | |
| 1998 | Anda kub Fahsai | Anda's father |
| 2001 | The Legend of Suriyothai | Somdet Phra Chairachathirat |
| 2002 | 7 pra-jan-barn (Heaven's Seven) | Sergeant Dab Jampoh |
| 2003 | One Night Husband | Chat |
| 2003 | Belly of the Beast | Mongkol |
| 2004 | Sagai United | Coach |
| 2004 | The Overture | Lieutenant Colonel Veera |
| 2005 | 7 pra-jan barn phaak 2 (Seven Street Fighters) | Sergeant Dab Jampoh |
| 2005 | Seua khaap daap (The Tiger Blade) | Kaoyot |
| 2007 | Opapatika | Thuwachit |
| 2008 | Chocolate | No.8 |
| 2008 | Ong Bak 2 | N/A |
| 2010 | Eternity | Ong Chai Pariwat (Prince Pariwat) (cameo) |
| 2011 | U mong pa meung (The Outrage) | Undertaker |
| 2012 | Antapal (The Gangster) | Hia Seng (Big brother Seng) (guest) |
| 2014 | Plae kao | Phuyai Khian (Headman Khian) |

Television

| Year | Title | Role | Network |
|---|---|---|---|
| 1986 | Tevada Tok Sawan (Fallen Angel) | Aed | Channel 9 |
| 1987 | Awasan Salesman (Death of a Salesman) | | Channel 3 |
| 1993 | Duay Song Moe Mae Nee Thee Sang Lok | | Channel 3 |
| 1996 | Police Jub Khamoey | Seua Hoy (Tiger Hoy) | Channel 3 |
| 1999 | Khun Dech | Khun Dech | Channel 7 |
| 2000 | Panthai-Norasing | Phra Chao Seua (King Suriyenthrathibodi) | Channel 7 |
| 2000 | Baan Saithong | Tan Tom (Sir Tom) | Channel 3 |
| 2005 | Yoo Kab Kong | Kong (literally: Grandpa in Teochew language) | Channel 9, repeat: PPTV |
| 2012 | Nuer Mek 2 | Sergeant Saming | Channel 3 |
| 2013 | Khun Chai Rachanon | Chao Luang Suriyawongse (Prince Suriyawongse) | Channel 3 |

=== As director ===
Film

| Year | Title | Notes |
|---|---|---|
| 2007 | Me ... Myself | Directorial debut |
| 2008 | Happy Birthday | In development |
| 2024 | Ha Gom The darkness of the soul | Mono streaming |

Television

| Year | Title | Notes |
|---|---|---|
| 2013 | Suphapburut Juthathep series Khun Chai Rachanon | Director and actor |
| 2024 | Duangjai Taewaprom series Laorchan | The sequel of Suphapburut Juthathep series |

== Music ==
Pongpat released several albums during the late 1980s and early 1990s with the now-defunct label Kita Records. His first album was pop rock, while his later records were more rock-oriented. Some of his better-known songs include Tua Samrong (ตัวสำรอง), Ik Nan (อีกนาน), Fun Fuen (ฟั่นเฟือน), Chai Naklaeng (ใจนักเลง), and Mai Ru Ni Wa (ไม่รู้นี่หว่า).

After a long time away from the music scene, on 22 January 2007, he rejoined fellow artists from the same label for a concert called the "Kita Back to the Future Concert".

=== Discography ===
Below is a list of Pongpat's studio releases. It does not include various collection albums.

- Pongpat (พงษ์พัฒน์) (1988)
- Pongpat Phak 2 (พงษ์พัฒน์ ภาค 2) (1989)
- Pongpat Phak Phitsadan (พงษ์พัฒน์ ภาคพิสดาร) (1990)
- Pongpat Phak 3 (พงษ์พัฒน์ ภาค 3) (1991)
- Rock Ni Wa (ร็อคนี่หว่า) (1992)
- Nakak Rock (หน้ากากร็อค) (1994)
- 101-7-Yan Rock (101-7-ย่านร็อค) (1995)
