= Kiat Songsanant =

Thai film director

- เกียรติ ศงสนันทน์
- Born: November 14, 1977 (age 48); Bangkok, Thailand
- Occupation: Film director
- Years active: 2003–present
- Notable work: Sayew

Kiat Songsanan (Thai: เกียรติ ศงสนันทน์; born 14 November 1977) is a Thai film director. He is known for directing a Thai movie called Sayew.

== Life and career ==
Kiat Songsanant was born in Bangkok, Thailand on November 14, 1977. He graduated from Suankularb Wittayalai School. He then switched to studying visual communication design at Rangsit University and later worked at an advertising company.

In 2003, Songsanant made a movie with Kongdej Jaturanrasamee called Sayew. The movie received an honorable mention for the Asian Trade Winds Award at the Seattle International Film Festival.

In 2004, the movie also got an honorable mention at the Hong Kong International Film Festival and was signed up for the Bratislava International Film Festival.

Songsanant has also written many films, including The Sperm and Fireball.

== Personal life ==
Songsanant was a classmate of Kongdej Jaturanrasamee while he was studying at Suankularb Wittayalai School.

== Filmography ==
Year	Title	Director	Writer
2003	Sayew	Yes	Yes
200ึ7	The Sperm (Asujaak)	No	Yes
2009	Fireball (Tar Chon)	No	Yes
2014	Timelime letters of memories	No	Yes
2015	Single Lady	No	Yes
2016	School Ghost	No	Yes
2019	Letter, Rain, Special Umbrella	No	Yes
