= See How They Run (2006 film) =

2006 Thai film

- Film poster
- Thai: โกยเถอะโยม
- Directed by: Jaturong Mokjok
- Written by: Jaturong Mokjok
- Produced by: Jira Maligool; Yongyoot Thongkongtoon; Chenchonnee Soonthornsaratul; Chanajai Tonsaithong
- Starring: Jaturong Mokjok; Prasittichoke Manasantadchart; Kohtee Aramboy; Chamon Tantanasiriwong; Pimchanok Ponlabhun
- Cinematography: Panya Nimchareonpong
- Edited by: Sunit Asavinikul; Muanfun Uppatham
- Music by: Mongkol Pongwachirin; Giant Wave; Sittichai Srichaiyantra; Channasa Mattaphan; Pravit Kadkasem
- Distributed by: GMM Tai Hub
- Release date: 3 August 2006
- Running time: 89 minutes
- Country: Thailand
- Language: Thai
- Box office: ฿27.8 million

See How They Run (Thai: โกยเถอะโยม) is a 2006 Thai supernatural comedy horror film directed by Jaturong Mokjok. Within four days of its release on 3 August 2006, it was able to earn ฿27.8 million, edging out other films such as Loveaholic, Miami Vice, The Lake House and Sad Movie.

== Cast and characters ==
Below are the cast of the film:

- Jaturong Mokjok
- Prasittichoke Manasantadchart
- Kohtee Aramboy
- Chamon Tantanasiriwong
- Pimchanok Ponlabhun
- Lukkana Amitsoon
- Jim Chauncheun
- Kom Chauncheun
- Joy Chuancheun
- Sunaree Rachasima
- Nok Chern-Yim
- Patcharee Na Nakorn
- Sumet Ong
