= Prachya Pinkaew =

Thai filmmaker

- ปรัชญา ปิ่นแก้ว
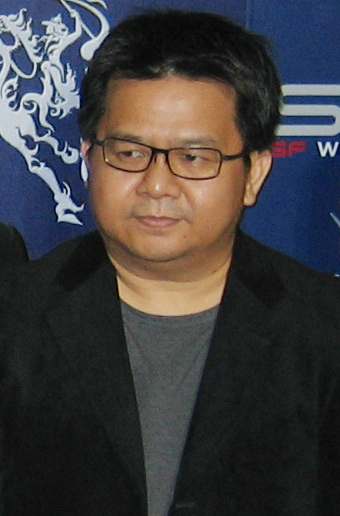
- Prachya Pinkaew attends the world premiere of King Naresuan in 2007.
- Born: September 2, 1962 (age 63); Nakhon Ratchasima, Thailand
- Occupations: Film director; screenwriter; producer

Prachya Pinkaew (Thai: ปรัชญา ปิ่นแก้ว; RTGS: Pratya Pinkaeo; born September 2, 1962) is a Thai filmmaker. His films include Ong-Bak and Tom-Yum-Goong, both martial arts films starring Tony Jaa.

== Biography ==
Prachya graduated from Nakhon Ratchasima Technology College in Nakhon Ratchasima Province, Thailand, in 1985, majoring in architecture. He began his career in 1990, working as an art director and later as creative director at Packshot Entertainment, an advertising firm. He directed music videos and won several Best Music Video Awards at Thailand's Golden Television Awards.

His first feature film was made in 1992 and called The Magic Shoes. It was followed in 1995 by Dark Side Romance, a karmic thriller-romance.

By 1998, Open Maker Head and BaaRamEwe 1999 was concentrating on producing films, including the vampire movie Body Jumper, the action-comedy Heaven's Seven, the horror movie 999-9999, the musical Hoedown Showdown, the frankly sexual comedy Sayew and the arthouse drama Fake.

With his own Baa-Ram-Ewe production house, his name is seen on many films produced for Sahamongkol Film International.

In 2003 he took the director's chair for Ong-Bak, starring Tony Jaa, which went on to become a worldwide sensation and was the highest-grossing Thai film of the year. He also directed Tony Jaa's next starring feature, Tom-Yum-Goong.

His next projects included Chocolate, about a young autistic female martial artist out for revenge, and Power Kids, about four young martial artists fighting off terrorists who have taken over a hospital. Daab Atamas (Sword), starring Tony Jaa, was canceled. He produced Ong Bak 2, with Jaa directing, released in 2008.

As the president of the Thai Film Directors Association, Prachya Pinkaew has been active during 2007 in lobbying against proposed legislation that would put into place a restrictive motion picture ratings system. The system would replace the 1930 Censorship Code, but would retain the Board of Censors' ability to cut or ban films.

After the violent crackdown on the 2010 protests, he produced an all-star music video with the message "May our happiness return" that is being shown on the Bangkok Skytrain.

In 2011 he directed the action film Elephant White starring Djimon Hounsou and Kevin Bacon, produced by Nu Image and Millennium Films. Filmed and set entirely in Bangkok, the film tells the story of a mercenary (Hounsou) in Thailand who is engaged by a 14-year-old girl who gives his life a new meaning. Bacon plays the mercenary's old friend who may or may not be on his side this time. The film was Pinkaew's English-language/Hollywood debut and was released in early 2011.

In 2011 he also directed the Thai-Korean co-production The Kick with stars from both markets. The film failed to recoup its budget.

In 2013 he directed Tom Yum Goong 2, the sequel to his earlier martial arts film with Tony Jaa reprising his role.

== Filmography ==
=== Director ===
- The Magic Shoes (Rawng tah laep plaep) (1992)
- Dark Side Romance (Goet iik thii tawng mii theu) (1995)
- Ong-Bak (2003)
- Tom-Yum-Goong (2005)
- Chocolate (2008)
- Elephant White (2011)
- The Kick (2011)
- Tom Yum Goong 2 (2013)
- Look Thung Signature (2016)
- SisterS (2019)

=== Producer ===
- Pop Weed Sayong (Body Jumper) (2001)
- 999-9999 (2002)
- Hoedown Showdown (2002)
- 7 pra-jan-barn (Heaven's Seven) (2002)
- Sayew (2003)
- The Unborn (2003)
- Fake (2003)
- Ong-Bak (2003)
- Pisaj (2004)
- Born to Fight (Kerd ma lui) (2004)
- Cherm (Midnight My Love (2005)
- Tom-Yum-Goong (2005)
- Mercury Man (2006)
- Dynamite Warrior (2007)
- The Sperm (2007)
- Sick Nurses (2007)
- Opapatika (2007)
- The Love of Siam (2007)
- Nak (2008)
- Ong Bak 2 (2008)
- Chocolate (2008)
- Power Kids (2009)

=== Screenwriter ===
- Ong-Bak (2003)
- Tom-Yum-Goong (2005)
