= Ong-Bak =

2003 Thai martial arts film

- Theatrical release poster
- Directed by: Prachya Pinkaew
- Written by: Suphachai Sittiaumponpan
- Story by: Prachya Pinkaew; Panna Rittikrai
- Produced by: Sukanya Vongsthapat; Prachya Pinkaew
- Starring: Tony Jaa; Petchtai Wongkamlao; Pumwaree Yodkamol
- Cinematography: Nattawut Kittikhun
- Edited by: Thanat Sunsin; Thanapat Taweesuk
- Music by: Atomix Clubbing Studio
- Production companies: EuropaCorp; Baa-ram-ewe
- Distributed by: Sahamongkol Film International
- Release date: 21 January 2003
- Running time: 108 minutes (original Thai version); 105 minutes (international version)
- Countries: Thailand; France
- Language: Thai
- Budget: $1.1 million
- Box office: $20.1 million

Ong-Bak (Thai: องค์บาก, pronounced [ʔōŋ bàːk]), also known as Ong-Bak: The Thai Warrior, is a 2003 Thai martial arts film directed by Prachya Pinkaew and featuring action choreography by Panna Rittikrai. It stars Tony Jaa in the lead role, alongside Petchtai Wongkamlao and Pumwaree Yodkamol. The plot follows Ting (Jaa), a Buddhist monk trainee and Muay Thai specialist from the village of Ban Nong Pradu, who volunteers to travel to Bangkok to recover the stolen head of a Buddha statue.

Ong-Bak proved to be Jaa's breakout film, with the actor hailed internationally as the next major martial arts star. For the film, Jaa won a Star Entertainment Award for Best Actor. The film was a commercial success and received positive reviews. It has since garnered a cult following. It was followed by two prequels, titled Ong-Bak 2 (2008) and Ong-Bak 3 (2010).

== Plot ==
An ancient Buddha statue named Ong-Bak is kept in the village of Ban Nong Pradu in rural northeastern Thailand. The villagers fall in despair after thieves from Bangkok desecrate the statue Ong-Bak and take the head with them. Ting, a resident and Muay Thai expert, volunteers to travel to Bangkok to recover the stolen head. Ting's only lead is Don, a drug dealer who attempted to buy an amulet in Nong Pradu earlier. Upon arriving in Bangkok with a bagful of money donated by the village, Ting meets his cousin Humlae, who has dyed his hair blond and begun calling himself "George."

Humlae and his friend Muay Lek are street-bike racing hustlers who make a living out of conning yaba dealers. Reluctant to help Ting, Humlae steals Ting's money and bets it in an underground fighting tournament at a bar on Khaosan Road. Ting tracks down Humlae and gets his money back after stunning the crowd by knocking out the champion, where his extraordinary skill grabs the attention of Komtuan, a grey-haired crime lord who uses a wheelchair and needs an electrolarynx to speak. Don is the one who ordered Ong-Bak's head stolen to sell it to Komtuan, who sees no value in it and orders him to dispose of it.

The next day, Humlae and Muay Lek are chased all over town by drug dealer Peng and his gang after a botched baccarat game scam at an illegal street gambling booth. Ting fights off most of the thugs and helps Humlae and Muay Lek escape in exchange for helping him find Don. They return to the bar, where Ting wins the respect of the crowd after defeating three opponents consecutively. The trio find Don's hideout, triggering a lengthy tuk-tuk chase. The chase ends at a port in the Chao Phraya River, where Ting discovers Komtuan's cache of stolen Buddha statues submerged underwater.

After the statues are recovered by police, Komtuan sends his thugs to kidnap Muay Lek and tells Humlae to ask Ting to fight his bodyguard Saming near the Thai-Burmese border in exchange for Muay Lek and the Ong-Bak head. Ting is forced to throw the match against the drug-enhanced Saming, and Humlae throws in the towel. After the fight, Komtuan reneges on his promise to release Muay Lek and return the head, where he orders his henchmen to kill the trio. Ting and Humlae subdue the thugs and head to a mountain cave, where Komtuan's men are cutting a giant Buddha statue.

Ting defeats the remaining thugs and Saming but is shot by Komtuan, who attempts to destroy the Ong-Bak head with a sledgehammer. Humlae protects it with his body, taking the brunt of the hammer blows. The giant Buddha statue head suddenly falls, crushing Komtuan to death and critically injuring Humlae. With his dying breath, Humlae gives the Ong-Bak head to Ting and asks him to look after Muay Lek. The head is returned to Ban Nong Pradu, and Ting fulfills his vow by riding an elephant into the temple in a traditional ordination procession to become a Buddhist monk in honor of Humlae's sacrifice, while Muay Lek, Humlae's parents, and the villagers watch on.

== Cast ==
- Tony Jaa as Ting
- Petchtai Wongkamlao as George/Humlae (as Mum Jokemok in ending credits)
- Pumwaree Yodkamol as Muay Lek
- Chattapong Pantana-Angkul as Saming Sibtid
- Suchao Pongwilai as Komtuan (as Suchoa Pongvilai in ending credits)
- Wannakit Sirioput as Don (Komtuan's henchman) (as Wannakit Siriput in ending credits)
- Chumphorn Thepphithak as Uncle Mao (as Chumporn Teppitak in ending credits)
- Rungrawee Barijindakul as Ngek (as Rungrawee Borrijindakul in ending credits)
- Cheathavuth Watcharakhun as Peng (as Chetwut Wacharakun in ending credits)
- Somjal Jonmoontee as Bodyguard 1 (as Somjai Gunmoontree in ending credits)
- Somchai Moonma as Bodyguard 2
- Taworn Tonapan as Bodyguard 3
- Dan Chupong as Bodyguard 4 (as Chupong Changprung in ending credits)
- Chaiporn Gunmoontree as Bodyguard 5
- Don Ferguson as Bodyguard 6
- Panna Rittikrai as Nong Pradu Villager (uncredited)

Club fighters:

- David Ismalone as Mad Dog
- Hans Eric as Pearl Harbour
- Paul Gaius as Lee
- Nick Kara as Big Bear
- Nudhapol Asavabhakhin as Toshiro
- Taweesin Visanuyothin as Doctor Sak

== Production ==
Ong-Bak introduced international audiences to a traditional form of muay Thai (or Muay Boran, an ancient muay Thai style), a kickboxing style that is known for violent strikes with fists, feet, shins, elbows, and knees. The fights were choreographed by Panna Rittikrai, who was also Tony Jaa's mentor and a veteran director of B-movie action films.

Jaa, who was trained in Muay Thai since childhood, wanted to make the film in order to bring Muay Thai to the mainstream. He and Panna struggled to raise money to produce a demo reel to drum up interest for the making of the film. Their first reel was made on expired film stock, so they had to raise more money and start over. During the foot chase through the alleys, there is writing on a shop house door that reads "Hi Speilberg, let do it together" [sic]. This refers to the director's desire to someday work with Steven Spielberg. During the tuk-tuk chase, a pillar on the left side of the screen reads: "Hi, Luc Besson, we are waiting for you". The French producer-director's company, EuropaCorp, would go on to purchase the international distribution rights to the film.

== Alternate versions ==
After Ong-Bak became a hit in Thailand, sales rights for outside Asia were purchased by Luc Besson's EuropaCorp, which in turn re-edited the film. Most of the subplot involving Muay Lek's sister, Ngek, was removed, and the final showdown between Ting and Saming was shortened. EuropaCorp also replaced some of the score with different ones, along with adding a pair of hip-hop songs to the end credits. Contrary to popular belief, the main film score is the same in the Thai and EuropaCorp cuts. It is this version that has been made available in the United States and most of the Western world.

For the United Kingdom release, the soundtrack was rescored with an orchestral score by Richard Wells, but the film was left uncut with the subplot of Ngek. The Hong Kong cut of the film's theatrical release omits a "bone breaking" sequence toward the end, where George's arm is snapped and Ting in turn snaps the leg of a bad guy. DVD releases in Hong Kong have the scene restored.

An alternative ending offered on the Thai, U.S., Australian, and UK DVD releases has Humlae surviving. He is seen at the end bandaged up, limping, with his arm broken, supported by his parents. Prachya Pinkaew stated in an interview that although there was debate, they ultimately decided it would be appropriate for him to make a meaningful sacrifice for the village.

=== Alternate titles ===
- In Thailand, Germany and in France, it was simply called Ong-Bak. This name was also preserved in Premier Asia's UK release.
- For the release in Singapore, Australia and other territories, as well as film festivals, the film was released as Ong-Bak: Muay Thai Warrior.
- In the United States, Canada and other areas, the film was released as Ong-Bak: The Thai Warrior.
- The Hong Kong English title was Thai Fist.
- In Japan, the film was released as Mahha!!!!!!!! (マッハ!!!!!!!!) (the Japanese word for "Mach").
- In Italy, the title was Ong-Bak: Nato per Combattere, which translates as Ong-Bak: Born to Fight.
- In India, the title was Enter the New Dragon in reference to Bruce Lee.
- In Mexico, the title was Ong-Bak: El Nuevo Dragón, which translates as Ong-Bak: The New Dragon, in reference to Bruce Lee.
- In Vietnam, the title was Ong-Bak: The Hunt of the Statue of Buddha (Ong-Bak: Truy tìm tượng Phật).
- In Brazil, the title was Ong-Bak: Sacred Warrior ("Ong-Bak: Guerreiro Sagrado").

== Home media ==
Ong-Bak: The Thai Warrior was released in the U.S. on DVD by Magnolia Pictures on August 30, 2005 and on Blu-ray Disc by 20th Century Fox on February 2, 2010.

== Reception ==
=== Box office ===
Ong-Bak premiered as the closing film of the 2003 Bangkok International Film Festival, and then opened in a wide release in Thailand cinemas in February 2003. On February 11, 2005, the film was released in North America in 387 theatres under the title Ong-Bak: The Thai Warrior. In its opening weekend, it grossed US$1,334,869 ($3,449 per screen), on its way to a US total of $4,563,167.

=== Critical response ===
Ong-Bak was praised for its action sequences, especially its onrush of chase scenes, hand-to-hand combat and acrobatics, which are emphasized over its plot or characters. The action choreography drew notice for its quality, inventiveness and lack of CGI and wire-fu.

The film holds an 85% rating on Rotten Tomatoes based on 109 reviews, with the consensus being: "While Ong-Bak: The Thai Warrior may be no great shakes as a movie, critics are hailing the emergence of a new star in Tony Jaa, whose athletic performance is drawing comparisons with Bruce Lee, Jackie Chan and Jet Li". On Metacritic it has a score of 69% based on reviews from 28 critics, indicating "generally favorable reviews".

Combat sports and striking analyst Jack Slack stated that Ong-Bak "is perhaps the finest martial arts movie of this generation".

== Prequels ==
After Ong-Bak became a huge worldwide hit, Jaa's name was attached to many projects. He went on to act in a small role in the Petchtai Wongkamlao vehicle, The Bodyguard (co-directed by Panna Rittikrai), and then starred in the much-anticipated Tom-Yum-Goong in 2005. Ong Bak 2, a prequel to the original film, was released in December 2008, with Jaa debuting as director.

A second prequel, Ong Bak 3, followed where the second film left off.

== See also ==
- List of martial arts films
