= Tom-Yum-Goong =

2005 Thai martial arts film

- The English-language Thai movie poster
- Directed by: Prachya Pinkaew
- Screenplay by: Napalee; Piyaros Thongdee; Joe Wannapin; Kongdej Jaturanrasamee
- Story by: Prachya Pinkaew
- Produced by: Prachya Pinkaew; Sukanya Vongsthapat
- Starring: Tony Jaa; Petchtai Wongkamlao; Bongkoj Khongmalai; Jin Xing; Johnny Tri Nguyen; Nathan B. Jones; Lateef Crowder; Jonathan Patrick Foo
- Cinematography: Nattawut Kittikhun
- Edited by: Marut Seelacharoen
- Music by: Zomkiat Ariyachaipanich
- Production companies: Sahamongkol; Baa-ram-ewe
- Distributed by: Sahamongkol Film International (Thailand); The Weinstein Company (International)
- Release date: 11 August 2005
- Running time: 110 minutes
- Countries: Thailand; Australia
- Languages: Thai; English; Mandarin; Vietnamese; Spanish
- Budget: $5 million
- Box office: $27 million

Tom-Yum-Goong (Thai: ต้มยำกุ้ง, IPA: [tôm jam kûŋ]) is a 2005 Thai martial arts film directed by Prachya Pinkaew and stars Tony Jaa in the lead role. Pinkaew also directed Jaa's prior breakout film Ong-Bak. As with Ong-Bak, the fights were choreographed by Jaa and his mentor Panna Rittikrai.

The film was distributed as Warrior King in the United Kingdom, as The Protector in the United States, as Thai Dragon in Spain, as Revenge of the Warrior in Germany, and as Honor of the Dragon in Russia and CIS countries. In India, it was named as Haathi Mere Saathi from a name of another Bollywood film starring Rajesh Khanna.

== Plot ==
Kham is the last of a family line of guards who once watched over the King of Thailand's war elephants. Following the tradition, Kham takes great care in raising the animals and grows up forming close relations with his elephant, Por Yai, and its calf, Kohrn. During the Songkran festival, the animals are stolen by elephant poachers with the help of Mr. Suthep, a local MP, and his son. Kham raids Mr. Suthep's house and beats up the poachers.

However, the elephants are now in the hands of Johnny, a Vietnamese gangster who runs Tom Yum Goong Otob, a Thai restaurant in Sydney, Australia. Kham arrives in Sydney and is immediately taken hostage by a wanted thief. Sydney police officers Mark, a Thai-Australian, and his partner Rick corner the thief, who holds Kham at gunpoint. However, Inspector Vincent shoots the thief dead and then arrests Kham, accusing him of being another thief. In the car, Kham spots Johnny at Tom Yum Goong, where he becomes erratic and urges Mark and Rick to arrest Johnny, but to no avail. After causing the car to crash, Kham escapes and follows Johnny, who flees, forcing him to fight his henchmen.

Kham coerces a henchman to lead him to Johnny's hideout, interrupting a drug deal. Outraged, Johnny summons extreme sports enthusiasts to fight Kham. After defeating the thugs, Kham falls asleep in an alley. Pla, a prostitute that Kham met while confronting Johnny, brings him to her apartment. Mark and Rick are taken off the case and reassigned to provide security for the police commissioner's meeting with Mr. Sim. In that meeting, Pla is a hostess girl and dancer to the two men. Someone hired by Vincent murders Mr. Sim and the police commissioner. However, the murder is caught on the commissioner's camera.

Vincent kills Rick and blames Mark, who is later captured. With Pla's help, Kham enters Tom Yum Goong Otob, where he fights into the VIP area and reaches the dining hall at the top. Johnny taunts Kham with Kohrn's bell to protect his men. Enraged, Kham beats up his opponents and enters the storage area, where it contains various exotic animals ready to be butchered and eaten. Kham finds and frees Mark and Kohrn, escaping minutes before the police arrive. Vincent searches for Kham and Mark, hiding at a Buddhist monastery. Soon after their departure, Vincent and his men set the monastery on fire.

Believing that the temple and its inhabitants might be in danger, Mark and Kham decide to return. After arriving, Kham is confronted by three assassins: a fierce capoeirista, a sword-wielding wushu expert, and T.K., a giant wrestler. Kham defeats the first two, but T.K. proves too strong for him. Kham is about to be killed when the police arrive, and Mark comes to help him flee. Mark is later discovered by several policemen and sent to deal with Vincent, who is revealed to be behind the murder of the police commissioner. Kham arrives at a hall where Madame Rose, the leader of the Chinese gang, is having a press conference. Kohrn runs in, scaring off people while Kham engages the gangsters. Mark apprehends Vincent.

Finding himself with Kohrn in a vast room, Kham is shown the skeleton of Por Yai, encrusted with jewels as a gift to Madame Rose. Kham fights Madame Rose's men and brutally breaks many of the men's arms and legs. T.K., along with three others, are called. Kohrn is thrown through a glass wall, and Kham is knocked into the elephant ornament, causing two leg bones to fall off. Eventually, Kham defeats T.K. and the other wrestlers by using the sharp ends of the bones to slice their tendons; where he stops Madame Rose before she can escape in a helicopter, and they both crash into the room below. Por Yai's tusks break Kham's fall. Ultimately, Inspector Lamond forgives Mark, and Kham is reunited with Kohrn.

== Cast ==
- Tony Jaa as Kham
  - Nutdanai Kong as a young Kham
- Sotorn Rungruaeng as Kham's father
- Petchtai Wongkamlao as Sergeant Mark
- Bongkoj Khongmalai as Pla, a call girl.
- Xing Jin as Madame Rose, a transsexual member of a Chinese gang in Sydney.
- Damian De Montemas as Inspector Vincent
- David Asavanond as Rick, Sergeant Mark's partner.
- Nathan Jones (credited as Nathan B. Jones) as T.K., a giant wrestler.
- Johnny Tri Nguyen as Johnny, a Vietnamese gangster and a subordinate of Madame Rose.
- Lateef Crowder as a capoeirista
- Jon Foo (Jonathan Patrick Foo) as a wushu exponent.

=== Cameo appearances ===
- Pumwaree Yodkamol as a Thai tourist in a Sydney street scene.
- Wannakit Sirioput as Somsak a Mark's new partner.
- An impressionist portrays Jackie Chan, whom Kham briefly encounters at the airport in Sydney.
- Another impressionist portrays Thai rocker Sek Loso, the pitchman for the M-150 energy drink.
- Actors Don Ferguson, Erik Markus Schuetz, Lex de Groot (uncredited) and Damian Mavis (uncredited) appear as bodyguards.
- Strongmans Heinz Ollesch, Phil Pfister, and Rene Minkwitz appear as wrestlers.

== Production ==
=== Technical aspects ===
Compared to Ong-Bak, which was noted for its lack of wirework and CGI, this movie uses CGI in several scenes, from the obvious (helicopter scene, and an entirely computer-animated dream sequence), to the subtle (a glass window shattering in the four-minute steadicam long take that follows Jaa up several flights of stairs as he dispatches thug after thug in dramatic fashion).

The largest example of CGI is Tony Jaa's dramatic leap from the top of a building to attack Madame Rose with a double knee attack. While the background was blue screen with the Australian backdrop added in post production, the long fall shown on screen was real as Jaa and a stuntperson pulled the scene off, landing on large mats below. Even in scenes like this with blue screen, normally a stunt double would be called in for the lead actor, but Jaa once again made sure he did the stunt himself.

=== Fighting styles ===
Tony Jaa and Panna Rittikrai created a new style of Muay Thai for this movie called muay kodchasaan (มวยคชสาร roughly translated as "elephant boxing"), emphasizing grappling moves. "I wanted to show the art of the elephant combined with muay Thai," Tony told the Associated Press in an interview, adding that the moves imitate how an elephant would defend itself, with the arms acting as the trunk.

=== Stuntwork ===
Many aspiring stuntmen sent demo tapes, hoping to be cast in the film. An American stunt actor was cast but did not properly take the impact and was injured on the first take. "He kicked me, I used my arm to block his kick, and he fell down hard," Tony told the Associated Press.

However, no one was hospitalized in the making of the film, with injuries limited to "bumps and bruises, muscle tears, a little something like that. Nothing major," Tony said.

The fights include duels with:

- Wushu practitioner (portrayed by John Foo).
- A Vietnamese triad captain (portrayed by Spider-man stunt double Johnny Nguyen).
- A capoeirista (portrayed by Lateef Crowder of the ZeroGravity stunt team).
- An extraordinarily large and strong bodyguard (portrayed by former WWE wrestler Nathan Jones).
- A whip-wielding triad boss (portrayed by world-renowned ballerina Jing Xing).
- Two taekwondo fighters (portrayed by Daniel O'Neill and Dean Alexandrou) in a deleted two-vs-one scene in the temple.

== Alternative versions ==
International sales rights (outside Thailand) were purchased by Golden Network Asia, which made suggestions for re-editing to director Prachya Pinkaew, who then made some cuts that slightly reduce the film's running time from its original 108 minutes.

The UK title is Warrior King, and the theatrical release was on 28 July 2006. In France and Belgium, the title is L'Honneur du dragon, and in the Netherlands and other European it is Honour of the Dragon. In Cambodia, the film is called Neak Prodal Junboth. In India, it was named Haathi Mere Saathi (literally elephant, my partner), from a name of another Bollywood film starring Rajesh Khanna.

=== Deleted scenes ===
A two-vs-one fight scene taking place in the burning temple near the end of the film was deleted from currently released versions of the film. The taekwondo sequence, featuring Dean Alexandrou and Daniel O'Neill is shown in part in nearly all promotional trailers for the film, but was cut for unknown reasons from the final release. However footage can be seen in the making-of featurettes, and some behind-the-scenes VCDs. The two bodies are seen to mysteriously appear on the temple floor, near the beginning of the temple fight scene.

Prachya Pinkaew stated that he trimmed several of the fight scenes due to their length. Some of these include the sequence on the bridge in Sydney, when Kham confronts Johnny and his henchmen for the first time. One can see in certain trailers Kham launching himself off of the shoulders of one henchmen to elbow the other one. Another sequence that he trimmed considerably was the warehouse fight scene.

In the U.S. release of Tom-Yum-Goong, where it was named The Protector, there is a deleted scene of Kham beginning his ambush of the house party by the criminal group who stole his elephants. In all of its releases, the fight sequence begins with Tony Jaa throwing a henchman down the stairs. But this deleted scene shows where the fight really began.

=== US release ===
The Weinstein Company purchased the U.S. distribution rights for Tom-Yum-Goong and retitled it The Protector (also the name of a 1985 film starring Jackie Chan). This version was released theatrically on 8 September 2006. It was released in January 2007 on DVD on The Weinstein Company's Dragon Dynasty label in a two-disc set that includes both the U.S. edit and the original Thai version of the film.

For the US theatrical cut, the film's length was reduced by at least 25 minutes, going so far as to trim down some of the fight scenes, even though it was given an "R" rating restricting audiences to people aged 17 and over. Out of all cuts outside of Thailand, it is the shortest cut of the film, even more so than the European cuts. It also features a new score by RZA. Some parts of the missing footage (including cuts to the "bone breaker" fight and Madame Rose envisioning herself in a red dress as queen) appeared in the U.S. trailer and TV Spots.

Also, The Protector is partially subtitled and partially dubbed, with all of Jaa's dialogue subtitled. Several changes were made to the plot through editing and subtitles that did not match the spoken Thai and Chinese dialogue.

Changes that were made to the US theatrical release include:

- The historical role of the Thai warriors is given in more detail in the opening prologue
- Scenes of TV reporters given tour of Sydney by Sgt. Mark are removed.
- Scenes of Sgt. Mark handling robbery and releasing the would-be assassin are removed.
- Kham's father, rather than being injured, died by the gunshot.
- Tony Jaa's lines now include "You killed my father!"
- Madame Rose loses face and is denied a "security" contract over bad turtle soup instead of the Chinese business leader's refusal to deal because of bad terms.
- Madame Rose's transsexuality is never mentioned.
- The ending has been trimmed to imply that Madame Rose is dead rather than just injured after her fall through the roof.
- Johnny does not return to kill Vincent after Vincent was apprehended by Mark.
- Exposition is given to further explain the cutting of tendons to defeat the bruisers at the end.
- The ending epilogue given by Sgt. Mark in the US version is significantly different and nobler than the Thai version, which is whimsical and comic relief in tone and is much less concerned with resolution.

== Reception ==
=== Box office ===
Tom-Yum-Goong opened in Thailand on 11 August 2005, and grossed US$1,609,720 in its first weekend and was No. 1 at the Thai box office (normally dominated by Hollywood imports) for two weeks in a row. It ended its Thai run with US$4,417,800, blockbuster business by Thai standards.

The Weinstein Company released Tom-Yum-Goong in North America in a heavily edited version entitled The Protector, which was the third release by their Dragon Dynasty label. It was also given the "Quentin Tarantino Presents" brand, which had proven lucrative in the past for films like Hero and Hostel. It opened in 1,541 cinemas on 8 September 2006 and ranked No. 4 in its opening weekend, grossing $5,034,180 ($3,226 per screen). It ended its run with $12,044,087. In the US, it ranks 67th among martial arts films and 14th among foreign films.

The film's total worldwide box office gross is US$25,715,096. It is the most successful Thai film released in the US. Metacritic gives it a 52 based on 22 review while on IMDb the film has a 7 out of 10 based on over 40,000 reviews

=== Critical response ===
On Review aggregator website, Rotten Tomatoes gives the American edit of the film a score of 53% out of 91 reviews, with an average rating of 5.5/10. The critical consensus reads, "Despite some impressive fight scenes, this trimmed-down version of the Thai action pic is an off-putting mix of scant plot, choppy editing, and confusing subtitles and dubbing."

High On Films gave a positive review and wrote "Tom-Yum-Goong ranks amongst the finest exhibitions of martial arts in cinema, and is definitely worth a shot." Combat sports and striking analyst Jack Slack has written that Tony Jaa's multiple attackers scene in the film is "the best fight in movie history".

== Sequel ==
A sequel titled Tom Yum Goong 2 was released in 2013 and was also released in US as The Protector 2.
