= Sahamongkol Film International =

Thai film producer and distributor

Sahamongkol Film International Co. Ltd.
- Type: Private
- Industry: Motion pictures
- Founded: 1970; 56 years ago
- Headquarters: Bangkok, Thailand
- Key people: Somsak Techaratanaprasert
- Subsidiaries: Mongkol Major
- Website: www.sahamongkolfilm.com

Sahamongkol Film International Co. Ltd. (Thai: บริษัท สหมงคลฟิล์ม จำกัด, also Sahamongkolfilm, Mongkol Film or SM) is a Thai film production and distribution company. It is the leading movie company in Thailand, ahead of GMM Grammy's GDH 559, Five Star Production and RS Film.

The company is privately owned and run by its founder and chief executive, Somsak Techaratanaprasert, who is also known as "Sia Jiang". The company's films include the international hit martial arts films Ong-Bak, Tom-Yum-Goong and Chai Lai, and the animated movie Nak, as well as recent romantic comedy hit drama film First Love. It distributes foreign films in Thailand through its Mongkol Major distribution company.

In the 1980s, after the Thai government relaxed import tax policies on cultural imports, Sahamongkol became the primary Thai distributor of major American film studios at the time, which included output from United International Pictures, 20th Century Fox, Columbia Pictures, Buena Vista International, TriStar Pictures, New Line Cinema, De Laurentiis Entertainment Group & Orion Pictures, and Now, Sahamongkol Film Thai Films Worldwide Sales Across outside of Thailand, However, Acquisitions Films for Two Divisions - Mongkol Cinema (Asian Movies from Japan, South Korea, China, Hong Kong and Others) and Mongkol Major (Focus Hollywood Movie (Include Independent Partnership with Lionsgate Movies, and International Films) for Release in Thailand, Cambodia (Licensed with Westec Media), Laos (Licensed with Napha Media) immediately.
