= List of 1984 films based on actual events =

This is a list of films and miniseries released in 1984 that are based on actual events. All films on this list are from American production unless indicated otherwise.

== 1984 ==
- A Proper Scandal (Italian: Uno scandalo perbene) (1984) – Italian crime drama film about the Bruneri-Canella case
- Amadeus (1984) – historical biographical drama film depicting a fictionalized story of Wolfgang Amadeus Mozart from the time he left Salzburg
- Amy (1984) – British biographical drama television film portraying the life of the pioneering British pilot Amy Johnson in the years leading up to her disappearance in 1941
- Annie's Coming Out (1984) – Australian drama film telling the story of Anne McDonald's early life in a government institution for people with severe disabilities and her subsequent release, as well as her therapist's attempts to communicate with her through the discredited method of facilitated communication
- Another Country (1984) – British historical romantic drama film loosely based on the life of the spy and double agent Guy Burgess, exploring his homosexuality and exposure to Marxism, while examining the hypocrisy and snobbery of the English public school system
- Attack on Fear (1984) – crime drama television film about married journalists who run a small town newspaper and expose corruption and cultism at a once respected rehab center
- The Bear (1984) – biographical drama film following the life of Paul "Bear" Bryant, head coach of the University of Alabama football team, who died in 1983
- Booker (1984) – biographical drama family television film following the early life of civil rights activist Booker T. Washington
- The Bounty (1984) – British epic historical drama film telling the story of the mutiny on the HMS Bounty
- The Burning Bed (1984) – biographical crime drama television film about battered housewife Francine Hughes
- Camila (1984) – Argentine romantic drama film based on the story of the 19th-century Argentine socialite Camila O'Gorman
- Champions (1984) – British sport drama film based on the true story of jockey Bob Champion
- Claretta (1984) – Italian historical drama film about the life and death of Claretta Petacci, the mistress of Benito Mussolini
- Country (1984) – drama film following the trials and tribulations of a rural family as they struggle to hold on to their farm during the trying economic times experienced by family farms in 1980s America
- The Cowra Breakout (1984) – Australian action war drama miniseries focusing on the friendship between an Australian soldier and Japanese prisoner
- Diary for My Children (Hungarian: Napló gyermekeimnek) (1984) – Hungarian biographical drama film telling the story of a girl returning from Soviet Union to her native Hungary to live with her Stalinist aunt – a semi-autobiographical story
- Down on Us (1984) – biographical drama film about 1960s rock stars Jim Morrison, Janis Joplin, and Jimi Hendrix
- Dreams of the City (Arabic: أحلام المدينة) (1984) – Syrian biographical drama film about a boy forced to flee his native Quneitra to Damascus in the turbulent 1950s – based on a true story
- Eureka Stockade (1984) – Australian drama miniseries based on the battle of Eureka Stockade
- Fatal Vision (1984) – crime drama miniseries recounting the celebrated case of Jeffrey R. MacDonald, the former Green Beret physician who was convicted of murdering his pregnant wife and their two small children
- Flight 90: Disaster on the Potomac (1984) – drama television film about Air Florida Flight 90 that crashed into the Potomac River in 1982
- Forbidden (1984) – romantic war drama film inspired by the life of Maria von Maltzan, a countess who hides her Jewish boyfriend in her apartment in World War II
- Freud (1984) – biographical historical drama miniseries based on the life and times of Austrian psychoanalyst Sigmund Freud
- George Washington (1984) – biographical historical drama miniseries chronicling the life of George Washington, the first President of the United States from the age of 11 to the age of 51
- Heartsounds (1984) – drama television film about writer Martha Weinman Lear's husband who suffered many heart attacks
- The Jesse Owens Story (1984) – biographical drama miniseries about the black athlete Jesse Owens
- John Wycliffe: The Morning Star (1984) – biographical drama film about the life and teachings of John Wycliffe
- Kalia (Punjabi: ਕਾਲੀਆ) (1984) – Pakistani musical action drama film dedicated to the dutiful jawans of the law enforcement agencies of Pakistan
- Kamalolmolk (Persian: کمال‌الملک) (1984) – Iranian historical drama film about the life and work of famous Iranian painter Mohammad Ghaffari, better known as Kamal-ol-molk
- The Killing Fields (1984) – British biographical drama film about the Khmer Rouge regime in Cambodia, which is based on the experiences of two journalists: Cambodian Dith Pran and American Sydney Schanberg
- The Last Bastion (1984) – Australian biographical war miniseries telling the story of Australia's involvement in World War II, and its often strained relations with its two main allies, Great Britain and the United States
- The Last Winter (1984) – American-Israeli war drama film telling the story of two women seeking leads to their missing husbands after the end of the Yom Kippur War – based on a true story
- Lev Tolstoy (Russian: Лев Толстой) (1984) – Soviet biographical drama film about the life and death of the great Russian writer Lev Tolstoy
- The Man from Majorca (Swedish: Mannen från Mallorca) (1984) – Swedish crime thriller film inspired by the Geijer affair
- Mesrine (1984) – French biographical crime drama film based on the life of Jacques Mesrine, focusing on the eighteen months following his escape from La Santé Prison in May 1978 until his death in November 1979
- The Miracle Continues (1984) – biographical drama television film based on the life of the blind and deaf Helen Keller
- Mrs. Soffel (1984) – romantic drama film based on the story of condemned brothers Jack and Ed Biddle, who escaped prison with the aid of Kate Soffel, the warden's wife
- Nadia (1984) – American-Yugoslav sport drama television film about Olympic gymnast Nadia Comăneci
- One Hundred Days in Palermo (Italian: Cento giorni a Palermo) (1984) – Italian biographical crime drama film telling about the last hundred days in the life of the Italian "Generale dei Carabinieri" and anti-mafia highest authority Carlo Alberto Dalla Chiesa as prefect of Palermo, the capital of the Italian island of Sicily
- Papa Mama Bye bye (Japanese: パパママバイバイ) (1984) – Japanese animated drama film centring on the 1977 Yokohama F-4 crash
- Pengkhianatan G30S/PKI (1984) – Indonesian propaganda drama film based on the 30 September Movement (Gerakan 30 September, or G30S) coup in 1965
- Pope John Paul II (1984) – biographical drama television film based on the life of Karol Wojtyła, from his early days as an activist in Poland to his installation as Pope John Paul II
- Sakharov (1984) – biographical drama television film about Russian physicist & dissident Andrei Sakharov
- Sam's Son (1984) – biographical drama film loosely based on Michael Landon's early life
- Samson and Delilah (1984) – Christian adventure drama film depicting the biblical story of Samson and Delilah
- The Schippan Mystery (1984) – Australian crime drama television film about the murder of Bertha Schippan in 1902
- The Secret Diary of Sigmund Freud (1984) – biographical comedy film about young Sigmund Freud's work with hypnosis
- Secret Honor (1984) – historical drama film about Richard Nixon
- The Story of Nampoo (Thai: น้ำพุ) (1984) – Thai drama film focusing around Nampoo, the son of the writer Suwanni Sukhontha, and his struggles with drug addiction, which eventually lead to his death
- The Three of Us (Italian: Noi tre) (1984) – Italian historical comedy film about Wolfgang Amadeus Mozart
- Victims for Victims: The Theresa Saldana Story (1984) – biographical drama television film depicting the true story of the brutal attack on actress Theresa Saldana by a deranged stalker
- Walls (1984) – Canadian drama film depicting a dramatization of the British Columbia Penitentiary hostage incident of 1975
- The Wannsee Conference (German: Die Wannseekonferenz) (1984) – West German-Austrian war drama film portraying the events of the Wannsee Conference, held in Berlin in January 1942
- Where Others Keep Silent (German: Wo andere schweigen) (1984) – East German biographical drama film depicting ten days in the life of socialist politician Clara Zetkin
- Who Killed Hannah Jane? (1984) – Australian crime drama television film based on the murder of Hannah Jane Peden
