= List of Thai submissions for the Academy Award for Best International Feature Film =

Best International Feature Film submissions from Thailand

Highlights
- Start: 1984
- Submissions: 33
- Nominations: None
- Oscar winners: None

Thailand has submitted films for the Academy Award for Best International Feature Film (Note: The category was previously named the Academy Award for Best Foreign Language Film, but this was changed to the Academy Award for Best International Feature Film in April 2019, after the Academy deemed the word "Foreign" to be outdated.) since 1984, when it became the second independent nation in Southeast Asia to join the competition, after the Philippines. The award is given annually by the Academy of Motion Picture Arts and Sciences to a feature-length motion picture produced outside the United States that contains primarily non-English dialogue. Thai submissions are selected annually by the Federation of National Film Associations of Thailand.

As of 2026, Thailand has submitted thirty-two films, but none of them were nominated.

== Submissions ==
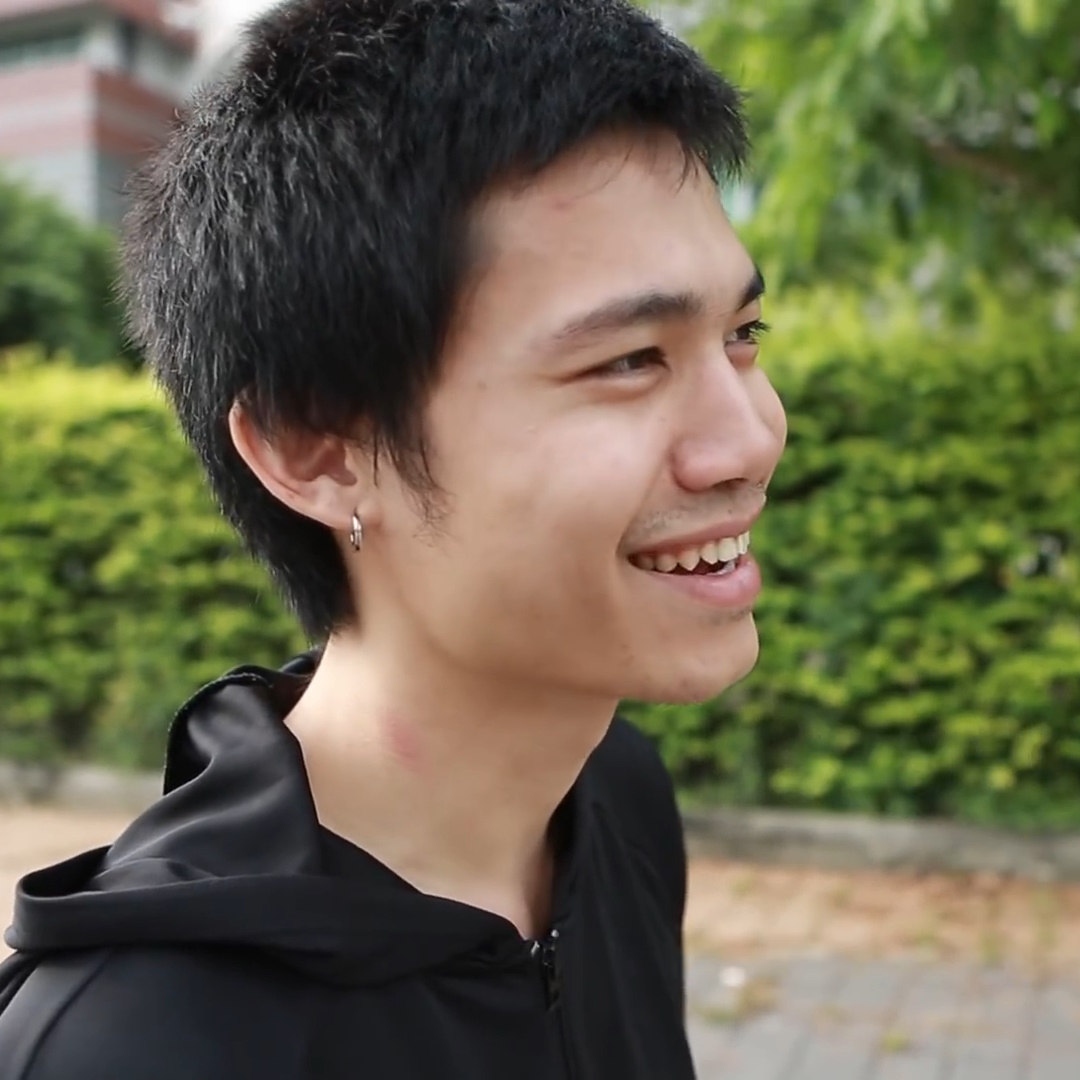
Pat Boonnitipat's film How to Make Millions Before Grandma Dies was the first Thai film to advance for the shortlist.

The Academy of Motion Picture Arts and Sciences has invited the film industries of various countries to submit their best film for the Academy Award for Best International Feature Film since 1956. The International Feature Film Committee oversees the process and reviews all the submitted films. Following this, they vote via secret ballot to determine the five nominees for the award.

The selection committee of the Federation of National Film Associations of Thailand generally has chosen movies that highlight key moments in Thai history or important social issues.

Thailand's five earliest submissions all dealt with contemporary social problems included Nam Poo (drug abuse), The Elephant Keeper (environmentalism and illegal logging), Song of the Chaophraya (prostitution and rural migration to Bangkok), Once Upon A Time (child poverty) and Daughter 2 (AIDS).

Four Thai submissions were fact-based period dramas – King Naresuan Part 2 was a lavish costume drama set in the sixteenth century about one of Thailand's most distinguished kings; The Overture tells the life story of one of Thailand's greatest classical musicians from the 1880s until the 1940s; The Tin Mine is about a spoiled rich kid who ends up working in the titular mine in Southern Thailand in the years following World War II; The Moonhunter followed a band of controversial, leftist rebels in the 1970s.

Three Thai submissions were fast-paced thrillers, two of which incorporated strong elements of Buddhism and karma into their plots, namely Who is Running? and Ahimsa...Stop to Run. Also submitted was 6ixtynin9, about a recently laid-off woman who finds a huge cache of stolen money.

Two submissions were romantic comedy-dramas that were box office hits domestically. Love of Siam featured a gay teen romance, and Best of Times featured two potential couples, one in their 20s and one in their 60s. Other submissions included a bittersweet genre-bending musical romantic comedy (Monrak Transistor in 2002) and a surreal, artsy drama in Japanese, English and Thai (Last Life in the Universe in 2003). Four submissions were directed by Chatrichalerm Yukol, a member of the Thai nobility, while other four were directed by Pen-Ek Ratanaruang.

In 2024, How to Make Millions Before Grandma Dies advanced to the December shortlist, but it was not nominated.

In 2025, A Useful Ghost by Ratchapoom Boonbunchachoke was submitted, but it was deemed ineligible by the Academy. Required information was not provided during the submission process, though attempts to correct it were made after the deadline had passed. The film's production company characterized it as a communication and coordination error.

All films submitted are primary in Thai. Below is a list of the films that have been submitted by Thailand for review by the Academy for the award by year and the respective Academy Awards ceremony.

Year (Ceremony)	Film title used in nomination	Original title	Director(s)	Result
1984 (57th)	The Story of Nampoo	น้ำพุ	Euthana Mukdasanit	Not nominated
1989 (62nd)	The Elephant Keeper	คนเลี้ยงช้าง	Chatrichalerm Yukol	Not nominated
1990 (63rd)	Song for Chao Phraya	น้องเมีย	Chatrichalerm Yukol	Not nominated
1995 (68th)	Once Upon A Time...This Morning	กาลครั้งหนึ่ง เมื่อเช้านี้	Bhandit Rittakol	Not nominated
1997 (70th)	Daughter 2	เสียดาย 2	Chatrichalerm Yukol	Not nominated
1998 (71st)	Who Is Running?	ท้าฟ้าลิขิต	Oxide Pang	Not nominated
2000 (73rd)	6ixtynin9	เรื่องตลก 69	Pen-Ek Ratanaruang	Not nominated
2001 (74th)	The Moonhunter	14 ตุลา สงครามประชาชน	Bhandit Rittakol	Not nominated
2002 (75th)	Monrak Transistor	มนต์รักทรานซิสเตอร์	Pen-Ek Ratanaruang	Not nominated
2003 (76th)	Last Life in the Universe	เรื่องรัก น้อยนิด มหาศาล	Pen-Ek Ratanaruang	Not nominated
2004 (77th)	The Overture	โหมโรง	Itthisoontorn Vichailak	Not nominated
2005 (78th)	The Tin Mine	มหา'ลัย เหมืองแร่	Jira Maligool	Not nominated
2006 (79th)	Ahimsa...Stop to Run	อหิงสา จิ๊กโก๋ มีกรรม	Kittikorn Liasirikun	Not nominated
2007 (80th)	King of Fire	ตำนานสมเด็จพระนเรศวรมหาราช ตอนประกาศอิสรภาพ	Chatrichalerm Yukol	Not nominated
2008 (81st)	Love of Siam	รักแห่งสยาม	Chookiat Sakveerakul	Not nominated
2009 (82nd)	Best of Times	ความจำสั้น แต่รักฉันยาว	Youngyooth Thongkonthun	Not nominated
2010 (83rd)	Uncle Boonmee Who Can Recall His Past Lives	ลุงบุญมีระลึกชาติ	Apichatpong Weerasethakul	Not nominated
2011 (84th)	Kon Khon	คนโขน	Sarunyu Wongkrachang	Not nominated
2012 (85th)	Headshot	ฝนตกขึ้นฟ้า	Pen-Ek Ratanaruang	Not nominated
2013 (86th)	Countdown	เคาท์ดาวน์	Nattawut Poonpiriya	Not nominated
2014 (87th)	The Teacher's Diary	คิดถึงวิทยา	Nithiwat Tharathorn	Not nominated
2015 (88th)	How to Win at Checkers (Every Time)	พี่ชาย My Hero	Josh Kim	Not nominated
2016 (89th)	Karma	อาปัติ	Kanittha Kwanyu	Not nominated
2017 (90th)	By the Time It Gets Dark	ดาวคะนอง	Anocha Suwichakornpong	Not nominated
2018 (91st)	Malila: The Farewell Flower	มะลิลา	Anucha Boonyawatana	Not nominated
2019 (92nd)	Krasue: Inhuman Kiss	แสงกระสือ	Sitisiri Mongkolsiri	Not nominated
2020 (93rd)	Happy Old Year	ฮาวทูทิ้ง ทิ้งอย่างไรไม่ให้เหลือเธอ	Nawapol Thamrongrattanarit	Not nominated
2021 (94th)	The Medium	ร่างทรง	Banjong Pisanthanakun	Not nominated
2022 (95th)	One for the Road	วันสุดท้าย ..ก่อนบายเธอ	Nattawut Poonpiriya	Not nominated
2023 (96th)	Not Friends	เพื่อน(ไม่)สนิท	Atta Hemwadee	Not nominated
2024 (97th)	How to Make Millions Before Grandma Dies	หลานม่า	Pat Boonnitipat	Shortlisted
2025 (98th)	A Useful Ghost	ผีใช้ได้ค่ะ	Ratchapoom Boonbunchachoke	Disqualified
2026 (99th)	9 Temples to Heaven	9 วัดสู่สวรรค์	Sompot Chidgasornpongse	Pending

== Shortlisted Films ==
Since 2012, Thailand has announced a list of finalists or eligible films that varied in number over the years (from 2 to 10 films) before announcing their official Oscar nominee. The following films have been shortlisted by the Federation of National Film Associations of Thailand:

Year	Films
2012	It Gets Better· P-047
2014	The Last Executioner · Mary Is Happy, Mary Is Happy
2015	Back to the 90s · The Blue Hour · F.Hilaire · Heart Attack · Mae Bia
2016	The Crown · The Island Funeral · Snap · Wandering
2017	Bad Genius · Song from Phatthalung · Pop Aye
2018	Die Tomorrow · Samui Song
2019	Manta Ray · Nha Harn · Norah · Where We Belong
2020	The Cave · Dew · Nemesis · Waning Moon
2022	Anatomy of Time · Come Here · Cracked · Faces of Anne · Fast & Feel Love · Happy Ending · Love Destiny: The Movie · Six Characters · The Up Rank
2023	Blue Again · Long Live Love! · Man Suang · Mondo · Scala · You & Me & Me
2024	4 Kings II · Breaking the Cycle · Morrison · Operation Undead · The Paradise of Thorns · Red life · Shakespeare Must Die · Solids By The Seashore · Taklee Genesis
2025	Art of the Devil: Beginning · Death Whisperer 2 · Flat Girls · Halabala · In Youth We Trust · The Red Envelope · Regretfully at Dawn · The Stone · Toey Thai Baan
2026	4 Tigers · Gohan · Human Resource · In the Name of Love · Morte Cucina · Regretfully at Dawn · The Undertaker 2

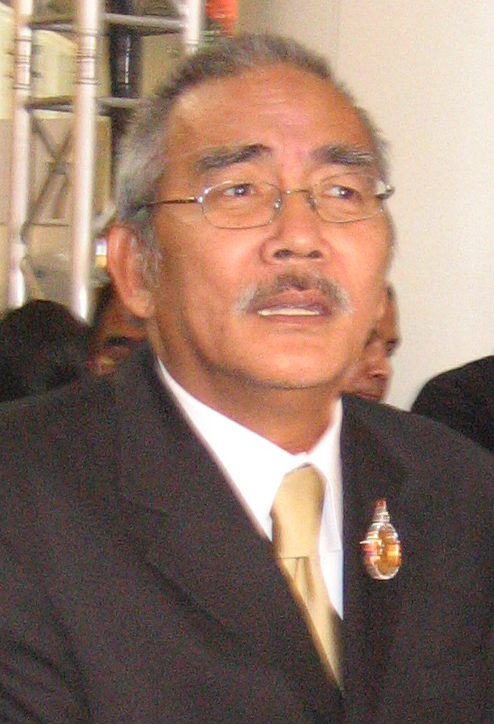
Director Chatrichalerm Yukol has had four of his films submitted.

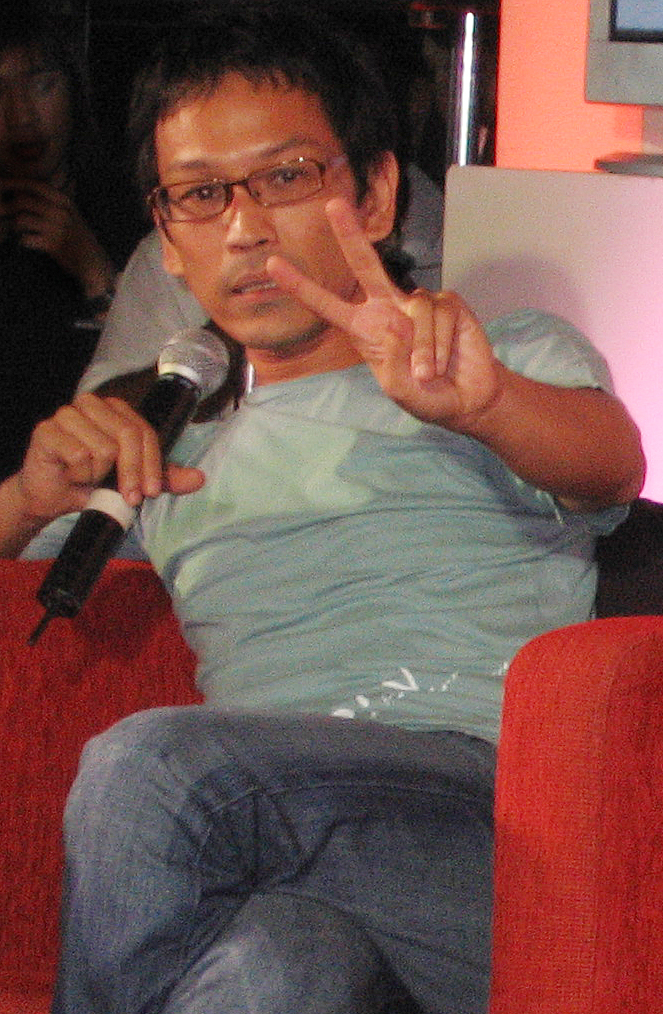
Four films by Pen-Ek Ratanaruang have been submitted.

== See also ==
- Cinema of Thailand
- List of Thai films
