= Song for Chao Phraya =

1990 film

- Film poster
- Directed by: Chatrichalerm Yukol
- Written by: Anusorn Mongkolkarn (story); Chatrichalerm Yukol (screenplay)
- Produced by: Kamla Sethi
- Starring: Chatchai Plengpanich; Passorn Boonyakiart; Pattamawan Kaomoolkadee
- Edited by: Chatrichalerm Yukol
- Music by: Surachai Chantimatorn
- Production company: Prommitr Production
- Release date: 24 March 1990
- Running time: 107 minutes
- Country: Thailand
- Language: Thai

Song for Chao Phraya (Thai: น้องเมีย; RTGS: Nong Mia; lit: "Wife's Younger Sister") is a 1990 Thai drama film directed by Chatrichalerm Yukol. The film was selected as the Thai entry for the Best Foreign Language Film at the 62nd Academy Awards, but was not accepted as a nominee. It is a remake of the 1978 film of the same name.

== Summary ==
Sang, a sand merchant operating along the Chao Phraya River, traveled from Nakhon Sawan to Bangkok in pursuit of his beautiful wife, Prang. She had abandoned him to seek fame in Bangkok, believing it would better their family. When she rejected his pleas to return, Sang succumbed to despair, drinking heavily and becoming a failure. In a moment of drunken desperation, he attempted to rape Tubtim, his wife's younger sister, but she escaped. The weight of his actions and the care of his young children then fell upon Tubtim, a young teenager forced to shoulder his burdens.

== Cast ==
- Chatchai Plengpanich as Sang
- Passorn Boonyakiart as Prang
- Pattamawan Kaomoolkadee as Tubtim

== See also ==
- List of submissions to the 62nd Academy Awards for Best Foreign Language Film
- List of Thai submissions for the Academy Award for Best Foreign Language Film
