= Khao Chon Kai (film) =

- The Thai theatrical poster.
- Directed by: Withit Kamsrakaew
- Starring: Sorapong Chatree; Wasit Phongsopa
- Distributed by: Sahamongkol Film International
- Release date: November 23, 2006
- Running time: 105 minutes
- Country: Thailand
- Language: Thai

Khao Chon Kai (Thai: เขาชนไก่) is a 2006 Thai teen comedy drama film directed by Withid Kamsrakeaw.

== Plot ==
Khao Chon Kai is a military training camp where Thai boys will face the challenge of the training during their senior year of high school. A group of boys meet at the camp and begin their training together, encountering many obstacles during the rigorous training regimines. Despite the hardships, they discover that friendship and true friends are the most precious things they've found in Khao Chon Kai.

== Cast ==
- Sorapong Chatree as Tai
- Wasit Phongsopa as Nhoi
- Apipon Treetewawongsa as Bob
- Aach Lhaisakul as Peun
- Ratchawin Wongviriya as Jib
- Thanapon Wikitset as Pualla
