= Hotel Angel =

1974 Thai drama film by Chatrichalerm Yukol

- The Thai DVD cover.
- Directed by: Chatrichalerm Yukol
- Written by: Chatrichalerm Yukol; Narong Chanruang
- Starring: Viyada Umarin; Sorapong Chatree
- Cinematography: Chatrichalerm Yukol
- Edited by: Chatrichalerm Yukol
- Distributed by: Mangpong
- Release date: 2 March 1974
- Running time: 103 minutes
- Country: Thailand
- Language: Thai

Hotel Angel (Thai: เทพธิดาโรงแรม, or Theptida rong ram, also known as Angel) is a 1974 Thai drama film directed by Chatrichalerm Yukol, about a young woman (Viyada Umarin) who becomes involved in the sex trade in Bangkok. The film was premiered on 2 March 1974.

Director Yukol spent nine months in a brothel researching the plot. During filming demonstrations broke out in Ratchadamnoen Avenue, Bangkok; part of the 1973 Thai popular uprising. Yukol left the studio and filmed the demonstrations, part of this footage was used in the film.

The film was inducted into the Thai National Heritage list of films in 2016.

== Plot ==
Malee is a farm girl from Northern Thailand who decides to sneak away to Bangkok with her boyfriend, Chate, but shortly after arriving, Chate disappears and Malee finds herself held captive in a "love hotel". To pay for the room, she is forced to sleep with men. At first, she is horrified by what she must do, but after a time, she becomes resigned and accepts her situation as fate.

With her debt paid, she starts to earn money working as a prostitute, giving her the ability to buy new clothes and send money home to her father, telling him she is working as a seamstress. As Malee is taking her clothes off, her father is putting new windows on his house.

Malee gains a reputation in her community as a person to be relied upon to help break new girls in. One particularly hard case refuses to be accepting as Malee was, and despite Malee's advice continues to be rebellious and eventually commits suicide.

Even after the death of her charming pimp (Sorapong Chatree), Malee continues until one day she is able to become independent of the sex trade. The ending is ambiguous. After being chatted up by a man, she runs to a shop to buy jeans and a shirt. Having put on these new clothes, she throws her old working clothes away and walks away.

== Cast ==
- Viyada Umarin as Malee
- Sorapong Chatree

== DVD ==
A DVD of the film was released in Thailand on an all-region, PAL disc, with English language subtitles, by the Mangpong retail video chain.
