= IATC =

IATC may refer to:

- Intermittent automatic train running control, the German Punktförmige Zugbeeinflussung
- International Association of Theatre Critics
