= Phuket (disambiguation) =

Phuket is an island province off the southwestern coast of mainland Thailand.

Phuket may also refer to:

- Phuket (city), the capital of the province, in the southeast of the island
- Amphoe Mueang Phuket, the district covering the south of the island around the capital
- Phuket (film), a 2009 Thai short film
