= By the Time It Gets Dark =

2016 Thai drama film

- Film poster
- Thai: ดาวคะนอง
- Directed by: Anocha Suwichakornpong
- Written by: Anocha Suwichakornpong
- Produced by: Lee Chatametikool; Benjawan Somsin; Soros Sukhum; Anocha Suwichakornpong
- Starring: Arak Amornsupasiri; Apinya Sakuljaroensuk; Achtara Suwan; Visra Vichit-Vadakan; Rassami Paoluengtong
- Cinematography: Leung Ming Kai
- Edited by: Lee Chatametikool; Machima Ungsriwong
- Music by: Wuttipong Leetrakul
- Production company: Electric Eel Films
- Release dates: 10 August 2016 (Locarno); 8 December 2016 (Thailand)
- Running time: 105 minutes
- Country: Thailand
- Language: Thai

By the Time It Gets Dark, known in Thai as Dao Khanong (Thai: ดาวคะนอง), is a 2016 Thai drama film directed by Anocha Suwichakornpong. In August 2016, the film was selected to compete for the Golden Leopard at the 69th Locarno Film Festival. It won the 2016 Suphannahong National Film Awards for Best Picture, Best Director, and Best Editing. It was also selected as the Thai entry for the Best Foreign Language Film at the 90th Academy Awards, but it was not nominated.

== Plot ==
The 1976 Thammasat University massacre is experienced through several individuals working to create a film about the event.

== Cast ==
- Arak Amornsupasiri
- Apinya Sakuljaroensuk
- Achtara Suwan
- Visra Vichit-Vadakan
- Penpak Sirikul
- Rassami Paoluengtong

== Critical response ==
The film has a rating of 90% on Rotten Tomatoes based on 20 reviews, and a 73 score on Metacritic based on 6 critical reviews.

== See also ==
- List of submissions to the 90th Academy Awards for Best Foreign Language Film
- List of Thai submissions for the Academy Award for Best Foreign Language Film
