= Rassami Paoluengtong =

Thai theatre director and educator

- รัศมี เปาลึงทอง
- Education: Yale University
- Occupations: casting director; professor
- Awards: Thai IATC Lifetime Achievement Award

Rassami Paoluengtong, also known as "Khru Pom", is a Thai theatre director, casting director, professor, actor. She is best known for her work as a director of foreign plays on the Thai stage, the co-founder of "Theatre 28", casting director of Good Morning, Vietnam, and Off Limits, professor at Silkaporn University in Thailand, and actor in By the Time It Gets Dark. Paoluengtong was honored with the Lifetime Achievement Award by the International Association of Theatre Critics (IATC) Thailand.

== Early life and education ==
Paoluengtong attended the David Geffen School of Drama at Yale University for three years on a Fulbright fellowship graduating with a Master of Fine Arts in dramaturgy and dramatic criticism.

== Career ==
Rassami Paoluengtong co-founded "Theatre 28", a theatre company that played a significant role in the development of contemporary Thai theater.

In 2016, Khru Pom appeared in the film By the Time It Gets Dark, known in Thai as Dao Khanong, in the role of Taew, a former student activist who survived the 1976 Thammasat University massacre. The film was the Thai entry for the Best Foreign Language Film at the 90th Academy Awards.

== GalileOasis ==
Paoluengtong and Mam Noppomas Pattaragul redesigned family property that had been shophouses into a cultural center with a theatre space and hotel rooms in Soi Kingphet, Ratchathewi district of Bangkok. In 2022 a new Thai translation of Art by French playwright Yasmina Reza premiered at GalileOasis in 2022 with English and Thai surtitles.

== Awards ==
In 2023, Paoluengtong received the Lifetime Achievement Award by the International Association of Theatre Critics (IATC) Thailand.
