= Apichai Tragoolpadetgrai =

Thai singer

Greasy Cafe กรีสซี่ คาเฟ่
- Also known as: Lek (เล็ก)
- Genres: Britpop; folk rock
- Years active: 2001–present
- Label: Smallroom

Greasy Cafe (Thai: กรีสซี่ คาเฟ่), is a stage name of Apichai Tragoolpadetgrai, who is a singer, artist, songwriter, photographer and actor.

== Early life ==
Cafe's family made sports gear for a living. He studied at Prasartwuti Primary School, which teaches both Thai and Chinese. He then attended Petcharat High School and later graduated at the vocational level from Thaivichitsilp Art School. After that, he got an opportunity to learn photography in England for four years. During his time in England, he became a guitarist for The Light Band. He later went came back to Thailand to be a magazine photographer and film cameraman. In 2001, he joined the Smallroom Bangkok Pop Music Label and started writing lyrics and melodies. Next, he made a single in the "SMALLROOM001" and "SMALLROOM002" compilation albums. When he joined the Smallroom Label, he changed the name of his band to "Greasy Café". In 2009, Greasy Café released singles "Tid Tang", "Rueng Thammada" and "Pai Tai Tong Fah See Dum". These singles were on the top indie music charts for many months.

== Albums ==
- Sing Loa Nee (All These Things) - 2008
- Tid Tang (Directions) - 2009
- The Journey Without Maps - 2012
- Technicolor - 2017

Many of his songs are about love and life. The genre of his music is Brit-pop and folk rock.

== Film work ==
Tragoolpadetgrai did photography work for films such as Jan Dara, The Letter, Mont Rak Transistor, and Ong Bak 2. His acting debut was the 2011 film P-047.

== Awards ==
The album Tid Tang won two awards from Channel V Thailand Music Awards in 2009. Apichai Tragoolpadetgrai has won 13 awards and 13 nominations as an artist.

- Best Male Solo Artist and Best Song, awarded by Kom Chad Luek in 2013.
