= Phantira Pipityakorn =

Thai actress (born 2000)

- ภัณฑิรา พิพิธยากร
- Born: 4 January 2000 (age 26); Samut Prakan, Thailand
- Other name: Minnie (มินนี่)
- Occupations: Actress; model
- Years active: 2016–present
- Organization: Channel 7 (2017–2021)
- Height: 1.67 m (5 ft 5 1/2 in)

Phantira Pipityakorn (Thai: ภัณฑิรา พิพิธยากร; born 4 January 2000) is a Thai actress and model.

== Filmography ==
=== Television series ===
Year	Title	Role
2016	Nangfa Puean Fun	Lily
2017	Barb Borisut Live	Kitty
2018	Jao Sao Chang Yon	Maysa
2018	Bann Pun Dao	Panpan
2019	Pisard Hansa	Pawida Pamok
2019	Ruea Manut	Malathip
2019	Suparburoot Jorm Jon: Maturot Lohgan	Ploy Namkang
2021	Girl from Nowhere (Season 2)	Jane
2022	Sao Song Winyan	Fonkaew
2023	Get Rich	Rosarin
2023	Don't Touch My Gang	Vivi
2024	Blondie in an Ancient Time	Phrae

=== Film ===
Year	Title	Role
2017	Ruk Tur Hai Noy Long	Fern
2017	Ton Dai Took Tee	Fern
2018	Sum Term	Fern Phantira
2019	Inhuman Kiss	Sai
2019	Happy New Year Happy New You	Chaba
2021	Som Pla Noi	Minnie (Guest)
2022	Jaifu Story	Bua
2022	Faces of Anne	Anne
2022	The Lost Lotteries	Beat
2026	God Skin	Praewa
