= The Colonel (1975 film) =

- DVD cover
- Directed by: Chatrichalerm Yukol
- Starring: Sompop Benjatikul; Naiyana Chaiwanan
- Distributed by: Mangpong
- Release date: 8 February 1975
- Running time: 135 minutes
- Country: Thailand
- Language: Thai

The Colonel (Thai: ผมไม่อยากเป็นพันโท, Pom Mai Yak Pen Pan To, literally "I don't want to be a lieutenant colonel") is a 1975 Thai action-thriller film directed by Chatrichalerm Yukol.

== Plot ==
The story follows the exploits of a Thai intelligence officer who must assume the identity of a slain lieutenant colonel in a neighboring country's military who was working as a double agent.

== Cast ==
- Sompop Benjatikul as The Colonel
- Naiyana Chaiwanan as Lamduan

== DVD ==
The film has been released in Thailand on a PAL-encoded all-region DVD with English subtitles by Mangpong.
