= Chatrichalerm Yukol =

Thai film director, producer, screenwriter

Chatrichalerm Yukol; ชาตรีเฉลิม ยุคล
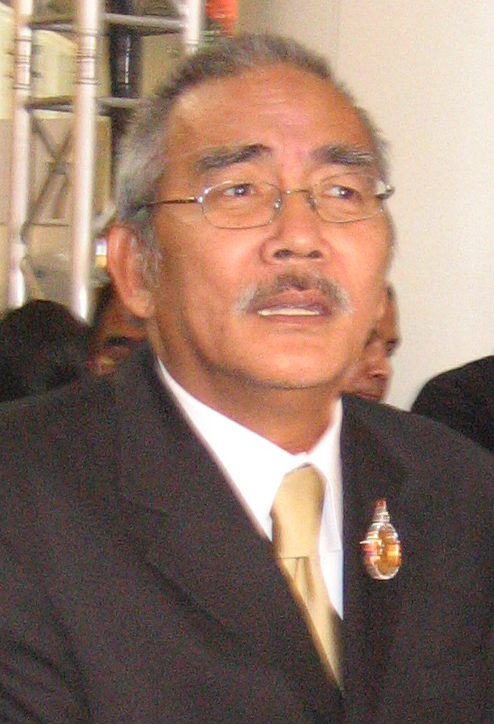
- Chatrichalerm Yukol in 2007
- Born: 29 November 1942 (age 83); Bangkok, Siam
- Spouse: Viyada Buspavanij; Viyada Umarin; Bharani Chetsomma; Kamala Sresthi
- Issue: Pattama Yukol; Dechachalerm Yukol; Mongkolvhai Yukol; Sutthiphanee Yukol; Chalermchatri Yukol; Srikamrung Yukol
- House: Yugala
- Dynasty: Chakri
- Father: Anusorn Mongkolkarn
- Mother: Ubol Yukol na Ayudhya
- Occupation: Film director; producer; screenwriter

Styles of Prince Chatrichalerm Yukol
- Reference style: His Serene Highness
- Spoken style: Your Serene Highness
- Alternative style: Sir

Prince Chatrichalerm Yukol (Thai: หม่อมเจ้าชาตรีเฉลิม ยุคล; RTGS: Chatrichaloem Yukhon; born 29 November 1942), or usually known by his nickname Mui (Thai: มุ้ย), is a Thai film director, screenwriter, film producer, and National Artist in 2001. A member of the Thai royal family, his official royal title is Mom Chao, or M.C., the most junior title still considered royalty.

A prolific director since the 1970s, among his films is the 2001 historical epic The Legend of Suriyothai. For Suriyothai as well as his 2007 historical epic, King Naresuan, Chatrichalerm was backed by Queen Sirikit. Four of his films have been submitted by Thailand for the Academy Award for Best Foreign Language Film: The Elephant Keeper, Song for Chao Phya, Daughter 2 and King Naresuan. He was a member of the jury at the 31st Berlin International Film Festival in 1981.

== Biography ==
=== Early life ===
Prince Chatrichalerm's parents, Prince Anusorn Mongkolkarn and Mom Ubol Yukol Na Ayudhya were filmmakers and co-founders of the Lavo Pappayon Company. His uncle was Prince Bhanubandhu Yugala, a pioneering Thai filmmaker.

Chatrichalerm was sent to Australia for schooling, and from there he went to UCLA, where he graduated with a degree in geology. His minor was film studies, and he shared classes with Francis Ford Coppola and Roman Polanski. He also worked as an assistant to director and producer Merian C. Cooper. (Chatrichalerm's grandfather, Prince Yugala Dighambara, had helped King Kong makers Cooper and Ernest B. Schoedsack with the filming of Chang in 1927.)

=== Early films ===
Though he's best known for his work on Suriyothai, Chatrichalerm's filmography stretches back to the 1970s. His first film, 1971's Out of the Darkness, was the first Thai science fiction film.

He was among the first of a new wave of Thai directors to produce films reflecting changes in society. One of these films was his Khao Chue Karn (Dr. Karn), based on a well-known story by Suwannee Sukhontha. Released in the months leading up to the bloody pro-democracy student uprisings of 1973, Dr. Karn dared to address corruption in Thai society.

Even Chatrichalerm's status as a prince didn't rate when the authoritarian government's censor wanted to cut the film. Chatrichalerm personally showed the film to Field Marshal Thanom Kittikachorn and was able to persuade the dictator to let the film be released uncut.

=== Social message films ===
Most of Chatrichalerm's films have some kind of social message, such as the downside of prostitution (Hotel Angel, 1974), teenage sex and delinquency (Daughter and Daughter 2), protecting the environment (The Elephant Keeper, 1987), or the evils of the drug trade (Powder Road, 1991). His films resist depicting any glamour, focusing on the poor, downtrodden working classes, such as Freedom of Taxi Driver (1984) or Song for Chao Phya and often with gritty action, such as Gunman (1983), Salween (1993), and The Colonel (1974).

Three of his films from this period were submitted by Thailand for the Academy Award for Best Foreign Language Film: The Elephant Keeper, Song for Chao Phya and Daughter 2.

=== Royal epics ===
Around 1999, Chatrichalerm embarked on the most ambitious film project of his career, The Legend of Suriyothai, a lavish production about a 16th-century Siamese queen, Suriyothai. For his production, he received the backing of Queen Sirikit and the royal family. The film was at first conceived as being eight hours long. By the time it premiered in Thai cinemas, it was nearly three hours long. An even-more-condensed version was released in the United States in 2003, edited and "presented by" Francis Ford Coppola, a former classmate of Chatrichalerm's from UCLA.

After Suriyothai, Chatrichalerm started work on an even bigger project, King Naresuan, about the 16th century Siamese monarch, Naresuan. More epic in scope than Suriyothai, Naresuan was initially released in two parts in early 2007. Under the title King of Fire, the second part of the series was submitted by Thailand for the Academy Award for Best Foreign Language Film. As of late 2007, a third part was scheduled to start production in early 2008.

== Awards ==
- 2001 – Thailand National Artist Award for Performing Art (Movie and Drama)
- 2004 – Lotus Award for Lifetime Achievement, World Film Festival of Bangkok
- 2006 – Suphannahong National Film Awards Lifetime Achievement Award (not present for ceremony; award accepted by frequent collaborator, actor Sorapong Chatree).

== Filmography ==
- Out of the Darkness (Mun Ma Kub Kwam Mued) (1971)
- Dr. Karn (Khao Chue Karn) (1973)
- The Colonel (Pom Mai Yak Pen Pan To) (1974)
- Hotel Angel (Thep Thida Rong Raem) (1975)
- Last Love (Kuam Rak Krang Suthai) (1975)
- The Violent Breed (Thewada Doen Din)
- Dangerous Modelling (1975)
- Angel Who Walks on the Ground (1976)
- Citizen I (1977)
- Kama (1978)
- The Yellowing of the Sky (Before the Storm) (1980)
- If You Still Love (1982)
- Gunman (Meu peun) (1983)
- Detective, Section 123 (1984)
- Freedom of Taxi Driver (Citizen II) (1984)
- Somsee (1986)
- The Elephant Keeper (Khon Liang Chang) (1987)
- Song for Chao Phraya (1990)
- Powder Road (Heroin) (1991)
- Salween (Gunman 2) (1993)
- Daughter (Sia Dai) (1996)
- Daughter 2 (Sia Dai 2) (1997)
- Box (Klong) (1998)
- The Legend of Suriyothai (2001)
- Last Love (remake) (2003)
- King Naresuan (2006–2015)
- Panthai-Norasing (2015)

Chatrichalerm Yukol House of Yugala Cadet branch of the House of Chakri Born: 29 November 1942
Lines of succession
Preceded by Prince Dighambara Yugala	Line of succession to the Thai throne 10th in line	Succeeded by Prince Charuridhidej Jayankura
Order of precedence
Preceded by Prince Dighambara Yugala	Thai order of precedence 21st position	Succeeded by Princess Nobhadol Chalermsri Yugala
