= Muen and Rid =

- Film poster
- Directed by: Cherd Songsri
- Written by: Charoen Iamphungporn
- Screenplay by: Tham Thathree; Channipa
- Produced by: Charoen Iamphungporn (executive)
- Starring: Chintara Sukapatana; Santisuk Promsiri; Duangdao Jarujinda; Man Terapol; Ron Rittichai
- Cinematography: Anupap Buachand
- Edited by: ML Warapa Ukrit
- Music by: Chamras Saewataporn
- Production company: Five Star Production
- Distributed by: Five Star Production; Cherdchai Productions
- Release date: 12 March 1994
- Running time: 127 minutes
- Country: Thailand
- Language: Thai

Muen and Rid, originally known in Thai as Amdaeng Muean Kap Nai Rit (Thai: อำแดงเหมือนกับนายริด), is a 1994 Thai drama film directed by Cherd Songsri, starred by Chintara Sukapatana, Santisuk Promsiri, Duangdao Jarujinda, Man Terapol, Ron Rittichai, and produced by Five Star Production

The film was screened at the Focus on Asia Fukuoka International Film Festival in 1994, the 10th Singapore International Film Festival in 1997, and the 7th Bangkok International Film Festival in 2009.

== Plot ==
The story of this film is adapted from a case in the civil code and a legal precedent during the reign of King Rama IV. It tells the story of Muen, the daughter of Ket and Nuen, who worked as a gardener in Bang Muang, Nonthaburi. Ket and Nuen gave Muen in marriage to Phu. When Muen refused to comply, her parents had Phu forcibly take her away. However, Muen escaped back to her home, only for Phu to abduct her again. This time, she ran away to stay with Rid, her lover. Phu then sued Rid, accusing him of kidnapping his wife. While the plaintiff and defendant were in court, Muen was detained in the prison of the Nonthaburi governor's residence and was subjected to various forms of abuse by Phamaran, who was bribed by Phu, in an attempt to force Muen to consent to become Phu's wife. Muen eventually escaped from prison and submitted a petition to King Rama IV at the Suthaisawan Throne Hall on Sunday, December 10, 1865.

== Cast ==
- Chintara Sukapatana as Miss Muen
- Santisuk Promsiri as Rid
- Duangdao Jarujinda as Nun
- Ron Rittichai as Phu
- Man Terapol as Ket
- Chalit Fuengarom as Piam Phamarong
- Somchai Asanajinda as Somphan
- Ruj Ronnapop as Phra Nonthaburi

== Adaptations ==
The film was adapted into a television drama in 2012 and a play in 2015.
