= Cherd Songsri =

Thai film director, screenwriter and film producer

- เชิด ทรงศรี
- Cherd Songsri on the set of his 2001 film, Behind the Painting.
- Born: September 20, 1931; Nakhon Si Thammarat, Thailand
- Died: May 21, 2006 (aged 74); Bangkok, Thailand
- Occupations: Film director; film producer; screenwriter
- Years active: 1960s–2000s
- Awards: Three Continents Festival 1981 Golden Montgolfiere award Plae Kao; Thailand National Film Association Awards 2005 Lifetime Achievement Award

Cherd Songsri (Thai: เชิด ทรงศรี, September 20, 1931 – May 21, 2006) was a Thai film director, screenwriter and film producer. A maker of period films that sought to introduce international audiences to his vision of Thai culture, his best-known work is the 1977 romance film Plae Kao (The Scar), which earned more box-office receipts than any Thai film before it. It won a prize at the 1981 Three Continents Festival in Nantes, France.

== Biography ==
Cherd was born in Nakhon Si Thammarat Province. He was trained as a maker of nang talung shadow puppets, which were fashioned out of animal skins. He was also a school teacher in Uttaradit Province and then became an editor of publications for the Express Transportation Organization of Thailand. From there, he became an editor of the Movie and TV Weekly magazine of Lak Muang Daily newspaper. Along with writing articles and short stories, he also authored radio and television show scripts.

Norah in 1966 was his first film. He handled all aspects of its production, from script writing, to securing financing and shooting the picture. It was a method of work that he retained throughout his career. Another film was the comedy, Poh-pla-lai, starring Sombat Metanee. Both were the most successful Thai films of the 16-mm era.

Cherd studied filmmaking in the late 1960s at the University of California Los Angeles, and trained under director Walter Doniger at Burbank Studios.

His stay in the United States made him reflect on Thai culture and upon his return to Thailand, he established his own production company, Cherdchai, and set about making films that would present his concept of "Thainess" – idealized Thai values and culture of bygone years – to international audiences, making him the first Thai director to make films with international audiences in mind.

Films from this period include Khwam Rak (1973) and Pho Kai Chae (1975) and his most ambitious film, Plae Kao (The Scar) in 1977, starring Sorapong Chatree and Nantana Ngaograjang.

The story of a tragic romance between two peasants in rural Thailand, Plae Kao was the biggest box-office hit up until that time in Thailand. It shared the Golden Montgolfiere at the Nantes Three Continents Festival with They Don't Wear Black-tie by Brazilian director Leon Hirszman. It was also voted as one of the world's 360 classic movies by the Museum of the Moving Image in London, Sight & Sound magazine and film directors and critics worldwide in 1998. The Scar was remade in 2002 as Kwan-Riam.

Some Thai critics said Cherd was promoting a stereotypical image of Thailand.

"When I produced Plae Chow, I used the slogan 'We must show Thai traditional style to the world'," Cherd told the Thai website Movieseer. "This produced a great deal of negative sentiment towards the picture, because some people believe that this is not a topic to be shown on film. I am a stubborn person though, and once I set my mind to including this in my films, well it's been in every film I have ever made. The press is always asking me when I will make a contemporary film, but now, no one is asking."

His subsequent films followed the same pattern as Plae Kao – romantic tragedies set against a backdrop of historical, rural Thailand. Among his other works are Puen Pang (1987), about two sisters in love with the same man; Muen and Rid (1994), a true story from Rama IV-era Siam about a woman who petitioned King Mongkut to make equal rights for women; and Tawipob (1990), the first film adaptation of a novel by Thommayanti, about a modern-day socialite who time travels back to Rama V-era Siam and becomes involved in the political and diplomatic intrigue of the day.

Cherd directed and produced a total of 18 films. His last film, Khang Lang Phap (Behind the Painting) in 2001 was based on the classic Thai novel by Kulap Saipradit. It was a remake of a 1970s film by another veteran Thai director, Piak Poster.

In addition to filmmaking, Cherd was an active attendee of major international film festivals, such as Cannes, Tokyo and Hong Kong.

Among projects that he had hoped to make were a biographical film of Thai statesman Pridi Phanomyong as well as a movie that "tells the truth" about King Mongkut and Anna Leonowens of The King and I and Anna and the King fame, films that are banned in Thailand because of their portrayal of the king.

He battled cancer the last four years of his life, writing the book, Bantuek Kab Kwam-tai (A Diary of Death). He died at Ramathibodi Hospital in Bangkok.

Cherd was secretive about his age, saying he had stopped counting his birthdays at age 28. But in an obituary, The Nation reported he had been born in 1931.

== Filmography ==
- Norah (1966)
- Mekala (1967)
- Akara-taranee (1968)
- Phayasok (1969)
- Lampoo (1970)
- Kon Jai Bod (1971)
- Poh-pla-lai (A Light in the Dark, 1972)
- Khwam Rak (The Love, 1974)
- Pho Kai Chae (1976)
- Plae Kao (The Scar) (1977)
- Leud Suphan (1979)
- Poh Pla Lai (35mm remake, 1981)
- Puen Pang (1983)
- Ploy Talay (The Gem from the Deep, 1987)
- Tawipob (Another World, 1990)
- The Tree of Life (1992)
- Southern Winds (1993)
- Reun Mayura (House of the Peacock, 1996)
- Amdaeng Muen kab nai Rid (Muen and Rid) (1994)
- Khang lang phap (Behind the Painting) (2001)
