= Daughter 2 =

1996 film

- Film poster
- Directed by: Chatrichalerm Yukol
- Written by: Chatrichalerm Yukol
- Starring: Sorapong Chatree; Arunroj Liamthong; Marisa Anita
- Cinematography: Anupap Buachand
- Edited by: Chatrichalerm Yukol
- Music by: Piset Sangsuwan
- Production companies: Prommitr Production; Sahamongkol Film International
- Release date: 26 November 1996
- Running time: 90 minutes
- Country: Thailand
- Language: Thai

Daughter 2 (Thai: เสียดาย 2, Sia dai 2, lit: Such a pity 2) is a 1996 Thai drama film directed by Chatrichalerm Yukol. The film was selected as the Thai entry for the Best Foreign Language Film at the 70th Academy Awards, but was not accepted as a nominee.

This film is a sequel to Daughter, released a year earlier. The Daughter series explores the challenges faced by teenagers in Thai society. In Daughter 2, the story centres on a Thai-Western high school girl who accidentally contracts HIV. It marks the screen debut of Thai-Dutch actress Marisa Anita. The film also features Arunroj Liamthong, a real-life reporter, portraying Pasinee Srikamroong, a journalist covering the story to raise public awareness.

The film includes a scene shot at CentralPlaza Pinklao.

== Cast ==
- Sorapong Chatree as Rabin (Rose's Father)
- Arunroj Liamthong as Pasinee Srikamroong
- Marisa Anita as Rose
- Wichuda Monkolket as Sida
- Yanee Tramoth as Anuwat (as Yani Tramod)
- Sarin Bangyeekan as Sarit
- Fonpa Sadissarat as May

== See also ==
- List of submissions to the 70th Academy Awards for Best Foreign Language Film
- List of Thai submissions for the Academy Award for Best Foreign Language Film
