= Citizen I =

- Film poster
- Directed by: Chatrichalerm Yukol
- Written by: Chatrichalerm Yukol
- Produced by: Kiat Iamphungphorn
- Starring: Jatuphol Poopirom; Viyada Umarin; Pinyo Parnnui; Bu Wiboonnan; Benchamin; Aod Jindanuch; Noppadon Mongkolphan
- Cinematography: Chatrichalerm Yukol
- Edited by: Chatrichalerm Yukol
- Music by: Pises Sangsuwan
- Production company: Prommitr Film
- Distributed by: Five Star Production
- Release date: 25 November 1977
- Running time: 122 minutes
- Country: Thailand
- Languages: Thai; Isan

Citizen I (Thai: ทองพูน โคกโพ ราษฎรเต็มขั้น) is a 1977 Thai neo-noir film directed by Chatrichalerm Yukol produced by Prommitr Film, distributed by Five Star Production and starring Jatuphol Poopirom and Viyada Umarin. The film revolves around Thongphun Khokpho, a naive young farmer from Isaan who moves to Bangkok with his son in search of a better life and rents a taxi.

== Plot ==
Thongphun Kokpho is an Isan man who traveled from Udon Thani with his 5-year-old son to work in Bangkok. He sold his farmland and used the money to buy a taxi, which he drove to earn a living. Later, Thongphun was hijacked and had his taxi stolen. He was deceived, and the car was sold. Thongphun tracked down his car to the Prawattana garage. Despite visiting the garage several times, he could not do anything because the owner, Sakorn, was a man of influence. When Thongphun asked for his car back, he was beaten. Thongphun then decided to take the car back by force. During this attempt, he killed several people, but he still couldn't recover his car. Eventually, he surrendered to the police.

Thongphun's story reflects the plight of the poor who are exploited as they struggle to seek justice. In the end, he is defeated by a social system that provides little opportunity for the disadvantaged to fight for their rights.

== Cast ==
- Jatuphol Poopirom as Thongphun Kokpho
- Viyada Umarin as Taeng
- Pinyo Parnnui as a disabled person on the street
- Bu Wiboonnan as Sakorn
- Benchamin as a singer
- Aod Jindanuch as Hum Ha
- Noppadon Mongkolphan as ex-boyfriend of Taeng

== Production ==
The film was shot using 35mm color scope film, with real sound recorded directly onto the film, making it the first and only Thai film to capture the actual sound of Jatuphol Poopirom.

Citizen I was created as an inspiration from the 1948 Italian neo-realist film Bicycle Thieves, with Jatuphol Poopirom playing the role of Thongphun Khokpho, replacing Sorapong Chatree, who was unavailable due to commitments on another film project.

== Release ==
The film was released on 25 November 1977, and became a huge success, winning four Suraswadee (Golden Doll) awards across various categories. The film was remastered as part of "The Legend Collection" project by B.K.P. and Five Star.

The Thai Film Archive also screened it again in 35mm format on Sunday, May 20, 2018.

== Legacy ==
=== Sequel ===
In 1984, Chatrichalerm Yukol produced a sequel titled Citizen II, starring Sorapong Chatree as Thongphun Khokpho (replacing the late Jatupol, who died in a car accident in 1981). The film also featured Wichuda Mongkhonket, Suchao Pongwilai, and Krailad Kriangkrai, and was released on August 11, 1984. However, it did not achieve the same level of success as the original.

=== TV adaptations ===
Later, it was adapted into television dramas twice: the first in 1986, aired on Channel 7, starring Weerayut Ros-Ocha and Viyada Umarin, which won the Golden Television Award for Best Drama in 1986. The second adaptation aired in 2001 on Channel 3, starring Ampol Lamphun, Siraprapa Sukdamrong, Ekapan Borriruk, Ubonwan Boonrod, and Suwajanee Chaimusik.

== Awards ==
- The 3rd Phra Suraswadee Awards of 1977
  - Best Screenplay (Chatrichalerm Yukol)
  - Best Literary Work (Chatrichalerm Yukol)
  - Excellent Sound Recording (Niwat Samniangsenor)
  - Silver Doll Award - Special Award for Outstanding New Actor (Jatuphol Poopirom)
