= Blondie in an Ancient Time =

- Genre: Drama; Comedy; Time travel
- Written by: Pongsate Lucksameepong, Phantanat Wongwatcharakamol
- Directed by: Thananwat Taengthong
- Starring: Phantira Pipityakorn; Oabnithi Wiwattanawarang
- Country of origin: Thailand
- Original language: Thai
- No. of episodes: 22

Production
- Producer: Sinut Kamukamakul
- Cinematography: Sittipong Kongtong
- Running time: 41–44 minutes
- Production company: Workpoint Entertainment

Original release
- Network: Workpoint TV
- Release: 6 January – 17 March 2024

Blondie in an Ancient Time (Thai: นางทาสหัวทอง; RTGS: Nang That Hua Thong) is a Thai drama series. First broadcast on Workpoint TV. Watch reruns at 10:00 p.m. on Netflix.

== Synopsis ==
Phrae an online seller with her signature blonde hair, She is heartbroken and decides to pray to the sacred spirit Chao Por Ying Rak for a wish. She unexpectedly travels back in time to become a slave in the year 1889 during the reign of King Rama V. With only her mobile phone as her companion, Phrae is captured and forced into slavery in the mansion of Luang Kam. She meets Kla, a loyal young slave who helps her in every way possible. Miraculously, Prae discovers that the only way to return to the present is to help Kla find love. However, Kla is secretly in love with Tubtim, the betrothed of Khun Ek, a close friend of his master since childhood.

== Cast ==
=== Main ===
- Phantira Pipityakorn as Phrae
- Oabnithi Wiwattanawarang as Kla
- Yuranunt Pamornmontri as Luang Kam
- Sueangsuda Lawanprasert as Fueang
- Khwanruedi Klomklom as Waen
- Pichayadon Peungphan as Khun Ek
- Pratipa Mahayotaruk as Tubtim
- Thanongsak Suphakan as Phra Iao (Tubtim's father)
- Doe Doksadao as Gon
- King Konbai as Tun
- Sararat Sajew as Linchi
- Mollywan Phantharak as Fang
- Tee Doksadao as Chot
- Ounruan Rachote as Choi
- Dechapat Chairat as Ming
- Peter Tuinstra as Paul

=== Guest ===
- Phibun Taihuan
- Jirawat Vachirasarunpatra as Phraya Sombat Borirak
- Kittipol Kesmanee as Doctor Bunlue
- Supasit Chinvinijkul as Guardian spirit
- Supoj Pongpancharoen as Liang
- Setthasitt Limkasiddej as Phra Phipat
- Satida Sripromma as Priew
- Kidakarn Chatkaewmanee as Pat / Pete
- Darina Boonchu as Noey

=== Other ===
- Nattakrit Hamontri as Phrae's boyfriend
- Yotin Maphobpan as Sangha

== Original soundtrack ==
- "Ei yang wa" (อิหยังวะ), opening theme by Venita (Panatchakorn Ruengprathum, Tanyaporn Kijrungviroj and Kullaphat Sapsantitikul) (Used in EP. 1-9)
- "Thoe" (เธอ), opening theme by Anika Hallman (Used in EP. 10-22)
- "Nak pai ya" (นักป้ายยา), theme by Dechathorn Wanwanichkul
- "Kham rak" (คำรัก), male version ending theme by Kittitouch Kaewauthai
- "Kham rak" (คำรัก), female version theme by Sathida Prompiriya
