= Plae Kao =

1977 Thai romantic drama film

Plae Kao (The Scar)
- Theatrical release poster
- Directed by: Cherd Songsri
- Screenplay by: Cherd Songsri
- Based on: Plae Kao by Mai Muengderm
- Starring: Sorapong Chatree; Nantana Ngaograjang
- Cinematography: Somchai Leenanurak; Kawee Kiatnan
- Music by: Seri Wangnaitham
- Distributed by: Cherdchai Production
- Release date: 24 December 1977
- Running time: 121 minutes
- Country: Thailand
- Language: Thai
- Box office: 13 million baht

Plae Kao (Thai: แผลเก่า, RTGS: Phlae Kao; literally, 'Old Wound'), also known as The Scar, is a 1977 Thai romantic drama film directed by Cherd Songsri and starring Sorapong Chatree and Nantana Ngaograjang as two peasants in rural Thailand in a tragic, romantic relationship. The story is based on the novel of the same name by Mai Muengderm. The film's poster was designed by Chuang Moolpinit.

The film was one of the biggest box-office hits in Thailand at the time of its release, earning 13 million baht, a record figure at the time. It was remade in 2002 in Thailand as Kwan-Riam. In 2018, the film was digitized and restored by the Thai Film Archive (public company) and was re-released in Thailand in October 2018.

== Background ==
Cherd produced the film with the idea of showing it worldwide.

When I produced Plae Kao, I used the slogan 'We must show Thai traditional style to the world.' This produced a great deal of negative sentiment towards the picture, because some people believe that this is not a topic to be shown on film. I am a stubborn person though, and once I set my mind to including this in my films, well it's been in every film I have ever made. The press is always asking me when I will make a contemporary film, but now, no one is asking.

== Plot ==
In 1936 in rural Bang Kapi, at the time nothing but rice paddies and small farming villages, Kwan and Riam are the son and daughter of rival village chiefs. They both work in the rice fields with their water buffaloes. Riam at first resists the courtship of Kwan, but Kwan, a jolly young man who sings and plays bamboo flute, is persistent. Kwan pleads with Riam, telling her he wants to die in the river if he does not have her love. Riam gives in to Kwan's charms and the two pledge their love for each other at a spirit shrine on an island in the river.

Riam's father disapproves of the relationship. He wants Riam to marry Joi, the son of a wealthy local nobleman. Riam's father, Joi and some other men go to confront Kwan and find him on the spirit-house island with Riam. A brief sword fight ensues, and Kwan is struck by a sword wielded by Riam's older brother, Roen. The cut on the side of Kwan's head eventually becomes a noticeable scar, which Kwan says is a mark of his love for Riam.

At home, Riam is chained up in a storage shed. Her father then decides to send Riam to Bangkok, where she will be sold into slavery as a maid for Mrs. Thongkham, a money lender who holds the deed to Riam's father's land. When the woman sees Riam's face, she is struck by Riam's resemblance to her dead daughter. Instead of being put to work as a servant, Riam is essentially adopted by the woman, who gives Riam Western clothes and introduces her to high-class Bangkok society, including the son of a wealthy nobleman, Somchai.

Kwan grows despondent. His father urges him to enter the monkhood to wash away his bad luck. Kwan then goes to take a drink of water, and sees blood in the drinking gourd. He then breaks down and apologizes to his father for being ungrateful, and promises to be ordained the next day "if I'm still alive".

After hearing that her mother is near death, Riam returns to the village on Somchai's boat. Riam arrives to see her mother die, and a funeral is held. Kwan comes to bid his last respects, and Riam agrees to meet him the next day at noon, on the spirit island.

The next day, Kwan sets fire to Somchai's boat, to prevent Riam from leaving without meeting him. Kwan is then hunted by Somchai, Riam's father and older brother, Roen. Somchai finds Kwan and shoots him in the chest with a pistol. The mortally wounded Kwan swims to the spirit island. Riam then jumps in after Kwan, and grabs the knife from his hands and stabs herself, dying with her true love in the river.

== Cast ==
- Sorapong Chatree as Kwan
- Nantana Ngaograjang as Riam
- Jeffrey Louis as Asnee
- Setha Sirachaya as Joi
