= Kulap Saipradit =

Thai writer

Kulap Saipradit กุหลาบ สายประดิษฐ์
- Born: 31 March 1906; Bangkok, Siam
- Died: 16 June 1974 (aged 68); Beijing, China
- Occupation: Writer
- Writing career
- Pen name: Siburapha ศรีบูรพา

Kulap Saipradit (Thai: กุหลาบ สายประดิษฐ์; 31 March 1906 – 16 June 1974), better known by the pen name Siburapha (Thai: ศรีบูรพา; also romanized as Sriburapha or Sri Burapha), was a newspaper editor and one of the foremost Thai novelists of his time. He was a vocal activist for human rights and because of this, he ran afoul of the authorities and was jailed for more than four years. He spent the last 16 years of his life in exile in China.

== Biography ==
=== Education and early career ===
Portrait of Kulap

Born in Bangkok, Kulap studied at Debsirin, a school for students from wealthier families. Kulap himself did not come from a wealthy family. His father died when he was very young, and his mother, a dressmaker, and sister, a classical dancer, worked hard to fund his education.

In 1928, he wrote three novels. Two of them, A Real Man (Luk Phu Chai) and The War of Life (Songkram Chiwit), stood out. By 1929, Kulap had gathered his friends into a publishing group known as Suphapburut ("The Gentlemen"). Under Kulap's leadership, the group went into journalism.

In 1930, Kulap served as the editor of Thai Mai, an anti-monarchist newspaper

In 1934, Kulap spent three months in retreat as a bhikkhu (Buddhist monk). He wrote a religious novel, Facing Sin (Phajon Barb). The following year, he married Chanid Priyacharnkun. She later became the translator of three of Jane Austen's novels under the pen name "Juliet", and helped him to translate Pool by W. Somerset Maugham as well as Anton Chekhov's In Exile and Maxim Gorky's Mother.

In early 1936, Kulap was forced to resign from his work as a journalist. Late that year, he went to study in Japan, and upon his return, he wrote The Jungle of Life (Pa Nai Chiwit), and his romantic masterpiece Behind the Painting (Khang Lang Phap). Both stories were serialised in 1937. Behind the Painting was adapted as a film twice, in 1985 by director Piak Poster and in 2001 by director Cherd Songsri.

In 1939, Kulap began writing journalistic articles again. He and his group restarted Suphapburut, which had been closed earlier. In 1944 and 1945, Kulap was elected president of the Thai Newspaper Association. In late 1947, he and his wife Chanid left Thailand for two years, and travelled to Australia where he studied political science. On his return, he started a publishing house to publish his own works and those of his friends' in cheap editions. He also wrote several books, including Till We Meet Again (Chon Kwa Rao Cha Phop Kan Ik).

=== Jailed, exile ===
In 1951, during the second premiership of dictatorial Field Marshal Plaek Phibunsongkhram, Kulap set up the Peace Foundation of Thailand. The following year, he protested against the Korean War. He also demanded the lifting of press censorship. When he went to distribute food and blankets to the needy in Isan, he was among more than one hundred "agitators" arrested on 10 November 1952. Accused of treason and sentenced to about 14 years in jail, he was freed in February 1957 to celebrate the advent of the 25th Buddhist century. During his years in jail, Kulap wrote the first two volumes of an unfinished trilogy Looking Ahead (Lae Pai Khang Na).

In 1958, Kulap headed a delegation of writers to China. While he was attending an Afro-Asian Writers' Conference in Tashkent, there was a coup in Thailand and all members of Kulap's delegation were arrested and jailed on their return. Faced with the same fate, Kulap chose to remain in China where he led the life of a "democratic personality" in exile. He lectured on Thai literature at Peking University. He also contributed to the Afro-Asian Solidarity Front's cultural activities and to the Thai service of China's broadcasting radio. He died in China of complications resulting from pleurisy on 16 June 1974.

Kulap's son, Surapan, was married to Wanee, the daughter of Pridi Banomyong and Poonsuk Banomyong. Kulap's 100th Centenary Celebration, organised by the Thai Writers' Association and the Thai National Commission for UNESCO, was held in Bangkok from 14 to 15 December 2005. Kulap's wife, Chanid, died on 15 June 2010. The following year, on 28 July, Surapan Saipradit died from cancer at the age of 72.

== Legacy ==
The Sriburapha Award, an annual award given for excellence in writing, journalism, and the arts, is named in his honor.

== Partial list of works ==
Novels

- Chao Huachai (จ้าวหัวใจ; 1924)
- Khom Sawat Bat Chit (คมสวาทบาดจิต; 1924)
- Luk Phuchai (ลูกผู้ชาย; 1928)
- Prap Phayot (ปราบพยศ; 1928)
- Man Manut (มารมนุษย์; 1928)
- Lok Sanniwat (โลกสันนิวาส; 1928)
- Huachai Pratthana (หัวใจปรารถนา; 1928)
- Amnat Chai (อำนาจใจ; 1930)
- Saen Rak Saen Khaen (แสนรักแสนแค้น; 1930)
- Songkhram Chiwit (สงครามชีวิต; 1932; based on Dostoyevsky's Бедные люди [Poor Folk])
- Phachon Bap (ผจญบาป; 1934)
- Sing Thi Chiwit Tongkan (สิ่งที่ชีวิตต้องการ; serialized 1935, compiled 1939)
- Khanglang Phap (ข้างหลังภาพ; 1937)
  - Translated as Behind the Painting by David Smyth in 1990. Review by Tony Waters at Ethnography.com
- Pa Nai Chiwit (ป่าในชีวิต; serialized 1937-1938, compiled 1988)
- Chon Kwa Rao Cha Phop Kan Ik (จนกว่าเราจะพบกันอีก; 1950)
- Lae Pai Khangna (แลไปข้างหน้า; two volumes, 1955 and 1957, first published together in 1975)

Collected short stories

- Kham Khan Rap (คำขานรับ)
- Kho Raeng Noi Thoe (ขอแรงหน่อยเถอะ)

Poetry

- Atyakon Phu Ploi Nokphirap (อาชญากรผู้ปล่อยนกพิราบ)
- Phalang Prachachon (พลังประชาชน)

Non-fiction

- Khaphachao Dai Hen Ma (ข้าพเจ้าได้เห็นมา; 1931)
- Kanmueang Khong Prachachon (การเมืองของประชาชน; 1957, under the pen name Itsarachon [อิสสรชน])
- Pai Sahaphap Sowiat (ไปสหภาพโซเวียต; 1958)
- Manutsayaphap (มนุษยภาพ)
- Bueanglang Kanpatiwat 2475 (เบื้องหลังการปฏิวัติ ๒๔๗๕)
- Du Naksueksa Mo Tho Ko Duai Waen Khao (ดูนักศึกษา ม.ธ.ก. ด้วยแว่นขาว)

Translations

- Pool by Somerset Maugham, translated as Sa Sawat (สระสวาท)
- In Exile by Anton Chekhov, translated as Khao Thuk Bangkhap Hai Pen Khun Chon (เขาถูกบังคับให้เป็นขุนโจร)
- Mother by Maxim Gorky, translated as Mae (แม่)
