= The Elephant Keeper =

1987 film

- Film poster
- Directed by: Chatrichalerm Yukol
- Written by: Chatrichalerm Yukol
- Starring: Sorapong Chatree; Ron Rittichai; Ittisoontorn Vichailak; Aed Carabao
- Cinematography: Chatrichalerm Yukol
- Edited by: Chatrichalerm Yukol
- Music by: Piset Sangsuwan
- Production company: Prommitr Production
- Release date: 15 January 1987
- Running time: 136 minutes
- Country: Thailand
- Language: Thai

The Elephant Keeper (Thai: คนเลี้ยงช้าง; RTGS: Khon liang chang) is a 1987 Thai drama film directed by Chatrichalerm Yukol. The film was selected as the Thai entry for the Best Foreign Language Film at the 62nd Academy Awards, but was not accepted as a nominee.

== Cast ==
- Sorapong Chatree as Boonsong
- Ron Rittichai
- Ittisoontorn Vichailak
- Aed Carabao

== See also ==
- List of submissions to the 62nd Academy Awards for Best Foreign Language Film
- List of Thai submissions for the Academy Award for Best Foreign Language Film
