= Inhuman Kiss =

2019 film

- Theatrical release poster
- Thai: แสงกระสือ
- Directed by: Sitisiri Mongkolsiri
- Screenplay by: Chukiat Sakveerakul
- Story by: Sitisiri Mongkolsiri
- Produced by: Meo Boontamcharoen; Sangar Chatchairungruang; Yeonu Choi; Utai Khunmkong; Sirisak Koshpasharin; Pornchai Wongsriudomporn
- Starring: Phantira Pipityakorn; Oabnithi Wiwattanawarang; Sapol Assawamunkong; Surasak Wongthai
- Cinematography: Pithai Smithsuth
- Edited by: Manussa Vorasingha; Abhisit Wongwaitrakarn
- Music by: Chatchai Pongprapaphan
- Production companies: CJ Major Entertainment; M Studio; Transformation Films; North Star Production; Nakid
- Release date: 14 March 2019
- Running time: 122 minutes
- Country: Thailand
- Language: Thai

Inhuman Kiss (Thai: แสงกระสือ), also known as Krasue: Inhuman Kiss, is a 2019 Thai supernatural horror film directed by Sitisiri Mongkolsiri. It was selected as the Thai entry for the Best International Feature Film at the 92nd Academy Awards, but was not nominated. In 1940s Thailand, a krasue lives a normal life as a woman by day, but at night her head detaches from her body and seeks out for flesh and blood.

== Plot ==
Four children—Jerd, Sai, Noi and Ting—play hide-and-seek in the forest at night. Noi and Sai hide inside a house rumoured to be inhabited by the spirit of a Krasue that protects the forest. There, Sai encounters a krasue inside a wooden box.

Years later, Sai and Jerd remain in the countryside, while Noi is in Bangkok undergoing medical training. During World War II, all the professional nurses have left for Bangkok to care for the wounded, leaving teenagers such as Sai to help at the local hospital. Jerd has an unrequited crush on Sai, whose feelings for him are unreciprocated.

Sai reunites with Noi in the forest, rekindling their romance. However, Noi has returned with a tribe from his hometown to hunt a krasue. The tribe's leader explains that a female krasue can transform a human woman into one of their kind, while a male krasue, known as a krahang, experiences severe pain during the initial stages of transformation and risks having his intestines devoured by a krasue.

Sai begins noticing bloodstains on her bed that grow larger and darker each day. One night, she cries out in pain as her head detaches from her body and floats into the air: she has become a krasue. She ventures outside to hunt and feed before returning to her human form. Noi witnesses her transformation and helps her obtain meat to sustain herself, bringing them closer together. Consequently, Sai begins neglecting Jerd.

It is revealed that Jerd has known about Sai's condition all along and joined the hunting tribe to mislead its members. When the leader, himself a krahang, discovers Jerd's betrayal, he transforms him into a grotesque krahang. Sai visits Jerd, who begs her not to abandon him, as she plans to flee to Bangkok with Noi that evening.

Meanwhile, Sai's father takes her to a public film screening near the village's borders to disprove the rumours that she transforms into a krasue at night. Noi's monk mentor reveals an ancient legend about a krasue who, while married to a krahang, fell in love with a human and became pregnant by him. Enraged by her betrayal, the krahang killed both the krasue and her lover. According to the legend, every krahang is destined to fall in love with a krasue and eventually kill her by tearing out her heart, foreshadowing the possibility that Jerd will kill Sai.

During the screening, the villagers are horrified when Sai transforms into a krasue and pursue her with guns. An enraged Jerd confronts her, intending to kill her, but Noi persuades him to remember their friendship. Jerd relents, but the tribe's leader kills him before turning on Sai. The monk intervenes and kills the leader.

It is then revealed that Nual, the monk's wife, was the krasue who infected Sai. The monk had imprisoned Nual in a box in the forest in an attempt to prevent her death. Haunted by his guilt, he had helped Noi in the hope of sparing Sai the same fate.

Sai and Noi flee towards a river that leads to Bangkok, but the villagers have already destroyed Sai's body. Noi remains hopeful because her head is still intact. However, their hopes are shattered when Jerd's parents shoot Sai in the head, killing her.

== Cast ==
- Phantira Pipityakorn as Sai
- Oabnithi Wiwattanawarang as Noi
- Sapol Assawamunkong as Jerd
- Surasak Wongthai as Tad
- Sahatchai Chumrum as Phaen
- Sahajak Boonthanakit as Chalerm

== Reception ==
Meagan Navarro of Bloody Disgusting recommended the film, writing: "Inhuman Kiss does run a bit overlong and has a measured pace, but it builds into an insane climax."

== Sequel ==
A sequel entitled Inhuman Kiss: The Last Breath (Thai: แสงกระสือ 2) was completed in 2022 and released in Thailand on 30 March 2023.

== See also ==
- List of submissions to the 92nd Academy Awards for Best International Feature Film
- List of Thai submissions for the Academy Award for Best International Feature Film
