= Thai Mai =

Defunct newspaper in Bangkok, Thailand

Thai Mai (ไทยใหม่)
- 2 July 1954 issue of Thai Mai
- Type: Daily newspaper
- Publisher: Banjong Srisuchat (บรรจง ศรีสุชาต)
- Editor: Banjong Srisuchat (บรรจง ศรีสุชาต)
- Founded: 1930
- Ceased publication: circa 1954
- Language: Thai
- Headquarters: Bangkok, Thailand

Thai Mai (Thai: ไทยใหม่) was a Thai daily newspaper. Its publication started at the end of 1930 (2473) and was in continuous operation as a daily newspaper in Thailand up into the 1950s. It was an early business venture of Lek Komet (เล็ก โกเมศ). Lek was in his late thirties in 1930. His first success in business was as a compradore with the Burley Company. He subsequently started Haang Komet (ห้างโกเมศ) and then went on to his own branded line of cosmetics. He sold that business and used the capital to develop other ventures. Thai Mai was an early one of those ventures. He had a partner in the Thai Mai startup, one Ek Wisakul (เอก วิสกุล), another successful compradore.

== History ==
The first editor was Kulap Saipradit (กุหลาบสายประดิษฐ์), a man who would later achieve a great deal as a writer, editor and dissident. Thai Mai was Saipradit's second lead editor job, his magazine Suphap Burut ("The Gentlemen") having recently closed.He and his circle of associated writers all came over to the new paper. Editorial policy was moderately anti-monarchist, advocating the implementation of constitutional government.

Between 1930 and the 1932 revolution, the paper was ordered closed or fined a number of times, all for material that was deemed offensive to the established order. Credit for the paper's ideology was generally attributed to the editorial progressiveness of Kulap and his associates, but at least one of the owners, Ek, shared the sentiment for constitutional government. It was also clearly a business venture, in addition to whatever political ambitions it may have had. The masthead motto was “Start Life Anew by Reading Thai Mai”. It published news and essays and worked to generate reader appeal. The owners and editors succeeded commercially, and within a year or two they had added two publications: a Sunday edition called Thai Mai Wan Atthit (ไทยใหม่วันอาทิตย์), and Suriya (สุริยา), both focusing more on entertainment than news and commentary. Suriya specialized in serialized novels and publishing some of the early work of Jacob (ยาขอบ), another famous writer of the era.

Within a couple of years of the paper’s founding, before the 1932 revolution, Luang Wichitwathakan (หลวงวิจิตรวาทการ) came on as a new shareholder. Kulap and his associates were forced out and new editorial leadership was installed. Kulap’s biographers suggest that these changes were done because of Wichit, because he wanted the paper to be supportive of the government. However, Wichit was a member of the group of men who perpetrated the change of government in 1932. He was particularly close to then Col. Pibul Songkraam, the eventual long term, multi-term leader to whom he would remain allied for the next twenty-five years. At this time, Wichit was on the cusp of being immensely influential in creating the mythology of Thai nationalism. He had no interest in protecting monarchical government. He might, however, have had his own ideas about editorial direction and clashed with Kulap. Or his coming into ownership might have signaled to Kulap that his future with the organization was not going to fulfill his ambitions. It may also have been that Wichit’s ownership was part of a staged strategy to have an editorial outlet at the ready when the coup occurred in June 1932.

War time Thai Mai stayed quite close to the government in its editorial policy. Every edition had a text box just under the masthead with the words “Obey/believe Pibul Songkhraam [and] the country will be safe.” The paper sometimes reported on radio broadcasts of government propaganda at length, repeating much of the content as if it were authoritative news. Reading back and forth between the few Thai Mai editions that have been saved on National Library microfilms and the samples of other papers preserved in the Kyoto University online archive, it seems that Thai Mai’s headlines and story selection as the war was winding down remained more Japan-centric, avoided the obvious fact that the allies were on the cusp of victory.

There were at least two lead editors at Thai Mai between Kulap and the post-war period, Baworn Nuchsri (บวร นุชสรี), who was in the position in July 1943 and Sathit Semanil (สถิตย์ เสมานิล), who is named on the masthead in the position in the January 4, 1945 edition and may have continued in the role into the post-war era. Sathit appears to have been a professional newspaper person. He had experience at Thai Num (ไทยหนุ่ม), which was another one of Kulap Saipradit’s ventures, and at Chao Thai (ชาวไทย).

The executive editor/publisher throughout the entire period of Komet ownership was Banjong Srisuchat, (บรรจง ศรีสุชาต) who was hired by Lek Komet in 2473/1930 and stayed with the paper through 2496/1953, when it was sold. He seems to have been quite devoted to his work. It is said that Jit Phumisak (จิตร ภูมิศักดิ์) wrote for it for a time in 1947. The offices of Thai Mai were on Soi Captain Bush.
