= Out of the Darkness (1971 film) =

- Thai DVD release cover
- Directed by: Chatrichalerm Yukol
- Starring: Sorapong Chatree
- Cinematography: Jurai Kasemsuwan
- Distributed by: Mangpong
- Release date: 1971
- Running time: 140 minutes
- Country: Thailand
- Language: Thai

Out of the Darkness (Thai: มันมากับความมืด, or Mun ma gub kwam mud or It Comes Out of the Darkness, lit: "It Comes with Darkness") is a 1971 Thai science fiction musical action drama film directed by Chatrichalerm Yukol, about an invasion by extraterrestrial beings in Thailand. It was the first science fiction film made in Thailand, and was also the debut feature film by Chatrichalerm.

== Plot ==
Astronomer Professor Thongchai and his assistant Sek observe some meteorites falling and determine they struck somewhere in Southern Thailand. They head for Ranong Province where they start their investigation at a potash mine owned by Luang Kosit. When they arrive, they find the place under siege by some gunmen. Sek pitches in to help out, and to return the favor, Luang Kosit brings Thongchai and Sek to his home and offers them a place to stay.

Luang Kosit's daughter is Chonlada and she thinks she can help Sek determine where the meteorites fell. They contact the local "sea clan", where Chonlada had made friends with the chief's daughter, Sarai.

Meanwhile, a male friend of Chonlada's becomes jealous of her time spent with Sek, and while lamenting over the situation with some other friends, the group breaks out into song to chide him, while he voices his heartfelt desires.

At night on the sea clan island, the chief goes to pray to the goddess Kali on a cliff overlooking the sea. As he departs, he is attacked by a blob-shaped, tentacled creature that has a large glowing green eye. Possessed by the alien, the chief returns to his village, and with green ray beams emanating from his glowing green eyes, he kills everyone.

The next day, Sek, Chonlada and others from the mainland take a boat to the sea clan island. On the way there, another song is performed. Initially they think the village is mysteriously deserted, but upon further investigation they find only the skeletons of the villagers. The party decides the burn the village, however Sarai is still alive. Some drama ensues as she is trapped in the fire and Chonlada and the other men rush to her rescue, and then bring her to the mainland.

The next night, the alien creature finds its way to the mainland and attacks a young couple, who then turn their death-ray eye beams on others. Various ways are tried to kill the alien-possessed people, but they are impervious to bullets and flame. Professor Thongchai examines a sample of the alien under a microscope, and eventually it is noticed that exposure to sunlight kills the creature. This explains the creature only attacking at night.

It is then discovered that the alien has taken up residence in a nearby cave, so it is decided that the cave should be dynamited to close up the entrance. More drama ensues as Chonlada and Serei go into the cave just as it is to be sealed, and Sek and another man need to scuba dive in to rescue them through an ocean entrance.

Trapped in the cave with the alien creature, Serei is angry and wants revenge against the alien for killing her father and wiping out her village. She tries to attack it, but is vaporized by its green ray beam.

Sek and another man arrive to help Chonlada escape, and the other man is killed. Cut off from their escape route, Sek and Chonlada face certain doom, but then Sek finds a mirrored, metal shield and discovers it deflects the alien's death ray. He goads the creature into firing at him, directing the ray towards the roof of the cave. Eventually, the beams break through, and sunlight pours in, killing the alien.

== Production ==
Released in 1971, Out of the Darkness was the first science fiction film produced in the Thai film industry, and its production standards were crude compared to other sci-fi films and television series being made in the era. "It was terrible," director Chatrichalerm Yukol admitted in a 1994 interview. It was also his first film. "I was in television before I started in film. And then, I made a film called Out of the Darkness, just for fun, because no science fiction film had ever been made in Thailand. I was thinking about what if some of the ETs would come down in Thailand."

== DVD ==
A DVD of the film was released in Thailand on an all-region, PAL disc with English subtitles by the Mangpong video retail chain.
