= Phuket (film) =

- Directed by: Aditya Assarat
- Written by: Aditya Assarat
- Produced by: Soros Sukhum; Saksiri Chantarangsi; Wicha Kokapun
- Starring: Im Soo-jung; Sorapong Chatree; Supannada Plubthong
- Production company: Pop Pictures
- Distributed by: Extra Virgin Company
- Release dates: 9 October 2009 (PIFF); 30 September 2010 (Thailand)
- Running time: 30 minutes
- Country: Thailand
- Languages: English; Thai; Korean

Phuket (Thai: ภูเก็ต) is a 2009 Thai short film written and directed by Aditya Assarat. The story of the friendship between a Korean actress and a limousine driver at a hotel in Phuket.

== Plot ==
Jin (Lim Soo-jung) is a famous Korean actress who grows tired of her life. She comes for a holiday in Thailand, but finds that even here, she cannot escape the constant disruption of phone calls and fans. She makes for Phuket, a place that holds fond memories of her youth. There, she happens to strike up a friendship with Pong (Sorapong Chatree) a hotel limousine driver, who helps Jin find true spiritual rest.

== Cast ==
- Im Soo-jung as Jin
- Sorapong Chatree as Pong
- Supannada Plubthong as Assistant

== Release ==
Phuket completed filming in August 2009.

- The film premiered on 9 October 2009 during the 14th Pusan International Film Festival.
- The film been released on 30 September 2010 in Thailand.
- The film aired on Bluesky Channel in Thailand on 14 February 2012 at 8:30 pm, which falls on Valentine's Day.
