= List of submissions to the 62nd Academy Awards for Best Foreign Language Film =

1989 Best Foreign Language Film submissions

Highlights
- Oscar winner: (Italy) Cinema Paradiso
- Submissions: 37
- Debuts: 2

This is a list of submissions to the 62nd Academy Awards for Best Foreign Language Film. The Academy Award for Best Foreign Language Film was created in 1956 by the Academy of Motion Picture Arts and Sciences to honour non-English-speaking films produced outside the United States. The award is handed out annually, and is accepted by the winning film's director, although it is considered an award for the submitting country as a whole. Countries are invited by the Academy to submit their best films for competition according to strict rules, with only one film being accepted from each country.

For the 62nd Academy Awards, thirty-seven films were submitted in the category Academy Award for Best Foreign Language Film. The bolded titles were the five nominated films, which came from Canada, Denmark, France, Puerto Rico and Italy. Burkina Faso and South Africa submitted films for the first time. Puerto Rico was nominated for the first, and as of 2025, only time.

Italy won for the eleventh time for Cinema Paradiso by Giuseppe Tornatore.

== Submissions ==
Submitting country	Film title used in nomination	Original title	Language(s)	Director(s)	Result
Argentina	La Amiga		Spanish, German	Jeanine Meerapfel	Not nominated
Austria	The Seventh Continent	Der siebente Kontinent	German	Michael Haneke	Not nominated
Belgium	The Sacrament	Het Sacrament	Dutch	Hugo Claus	Not nominated
Brazil	Better Days Ahead	Dias Melhores Virão	Brazilian Portuguese	Carlos Diegues	Not nominated
Bulgaria	Time of Violence	Време разделно	Bulgarian	Ludmil Staikov	Not nominated
Burkina Faso	Yaaba		Mooré	Idrissa Ouedraogo	Not nominated
Canada	Jesus of Montreal	Jésus de Montréal	French, English	Denys Arcand	Nominated
China	The Birth of New China	开国大典	Mandarin	Qiankuan Li	Not nominated
Cuba	Supporting Roles	Papeles secundarios	Spanish	Orlando Rojas	Not nominated
Czechoslovakia	A Hoof Here, a Hoof There	Kopytem sem, kopytem tam	Czech	Věra Chytilová	Not nominated
Denmark	Memories of a Marriage	Dansen med Regitze	Danish	Kaspar Rostrup	Nominated
France	Camille Claudel		French	Bruno Nuytten	Nominated
West Germany	Spider's Web	Das Spinnenetz	German	Bernhard Wicki	Not nominated
Greece	Landscape in the Mist	Τοπίο στην ομίχλη	Greek	Theo Angelopoulos	Not nominated
Hong Kong	Painted Faces	七小福	Cantonese	Alex Law	Not nominated
Hungary	My 20th Century	Az Én XX. századom	Hungarian	Ildikó Enyedi	Not nominated
Iceland	Under the Glacier	Kristnihald undir jökli	Icelandic	Guðný Halldórsdóttir	Not nominated
India	Parinda	परिंदा	Hindi	Vidhu Vinod Chopra	Not nominated
Indonesia	Tjoet Nja' Dhien		Indonesian, Acehnese, Dutch	Eros Djarot	Not nominated
Israel	One of Us	אחד משלנו	Hebrew	Uri Barbash	Not nominated
Italy	Cinema Paradiso	Nuovo Cinema Paradiso	Italian, English, Portuguese, Sicilian	Giuseppe Tornatore	Won Academy Award
Japan	Rikyu	利休	Japanese	Hiroshi Teshigahara	Not nominated
Netherlands	Polonaise	Leedvermaak	Dutch	Frans Weisz	Not nominated
Norway	A Handful of Time	En håndfull tid	Norwegian	Martin Asphaug	Not nominated
Poland	Kornblumenblau		Polish	Leszek Wosiewicz	Not nominated
Portugal	The Cannibals	Os Canibais	Portuguese	Manoel de Oliveira	Not nominated
Puerto Rico	Santiago, the Story of his New Life	Lo que le pasó a Santiago	Spanish	Jacobo Morales	Nominated
Romania	Those Who Pay With Their Lives	Cei care plătesc cu viaţa	Romanian	Șerban Marinescu	Not nominated
South Africa	Mapantsula		Zulu, Afrikaans, Sesotho, English	Oliver Schmitz	Not nominated
Soviet Union	Zerograd	Город Зеро	Russian	Karen Shakhnazarov	Not nominated
Spain	Love, Hate and Death	Montoyas y Tarantos	Spanish	Vicente Escrivá	Not nominated
Sweden	The Women on the Roof	Kvinnor på taket	Swedish	Carl-Gustav Nykvist	Not nominated
Switzerland	My Dear Subject	Mon cher sujet	French	Anne-Marie Miéville	Not nominated
Taiwan	A City of Sadness	悲情城市	Taiwanese Hokkien, Mandarin, Japanese, Cantonese, Shanghainese	Hou Hsiao-hsien	Not nominated
Thailand	The Elephant Keeper	คนเลี้ยงช้าง	Thai	Chatrichalerm Yukol	Not nominated
Turkey	Don't Let Them Shoot the Kite	Uçurtmayi Vurmasinlar	Turkish	Tunç Başaran	Not nominated
Yugoslavia	Time of the Gypsies	Дом за вешање	Romani, Serbo-Crroatian, Italian, English, German, Macedonian, Slovene	Emir Kusturica	Not nominated

== Notes ==
- The South African submission, Mapantsula, was on the 1989 official AMPAS press release, but not on the 2007 updated list. In 1997, the AMPAS press release announced that Paljas had been selected as South Africa's first-ever submission.
