= Kidakarn Chatkaewmanee =

Thai actor and musician (born 1992)

- กิดาการ ฉัตรแก้วมณี
- Born: 22 January 1992 (age 34); Thailand
- Other name: Zung (ซุง)
- Occupations: Actor; musician; songwriter; music producer
- Years active: 2017–present

Mattnimare แมทท์นิแมร์
- Origin: Thailand
- Genres: Rock
- Years active: 2012—2020

Kidakarn Chatkaewmanee (Thai: กิดาการ ฉัตรแก้วมณี; born 22 January 1992) is a Thai actor and musician. Kidakarn graduated from College of Music, Mahidol University.

== Music career ==
Kidakarn is the guitarist of Mattnimare, a four-member band formed during his studies at Mahidol University. The band has released several popular songs, including "Happiness" (ความสุข), "Venus" (ความรัก), and "The Night of the 22nd Every Month" (คืนวันที่ 22 ของทุกเดือน). Notably, their song "Venus" earned the Best New Artist award and Best Recording Song award at the 28th Season Awards in 2016.

== Filmography ==
=== Films ===
Year	Title	Role
2017	Premika	Aek
2018	Ten Years Thailand	Man
2018	O-T-W Die On The Way	A
2019	London Sweeties	Pop
2020	Low Season	Tor

=== Television series ===
Year	Title	Role
2021	Bite Me	Aue
2022	Club Friday Season 14: Love & Belief	Kawin
2022	Real Fake	Sin
2022	Club Friday Season 14: Our Promise	Kawin
2023	Behind the Revenge	Thep
2024	Blondie in an Ancient Time	Pat / Pete
2024	Affair	Frank
2024	Affair: Uncensored	Frank
2024	K. Kaeng Phanit	Kaeng Kai
TBA	Love Public Company and Spirit	Best

== Discography ==
=== Singles ===
- ความรัก (Venus)
- ความสุข
- คืนวันที่ 22 ของทุกเดือน
- รอยต่อ
- ความทรงจำถาวร (Rom)
- น้ำตาเทียน (Tears)
- คืนนี้ (Tonight)
- ตัวประหลาด (Monster)
- กลัวเกินก้าว
- รอยประหลาด
- ลึก (Deep)
- Goodnight

== Award ==
- Seesan Awards 2016 – Best new artist award and great recordings from songs
