= Oabnithi Wiwattanawarang =

Thai actor (born 1994)

- โอบนิธิ วิวรรธนวรางค์
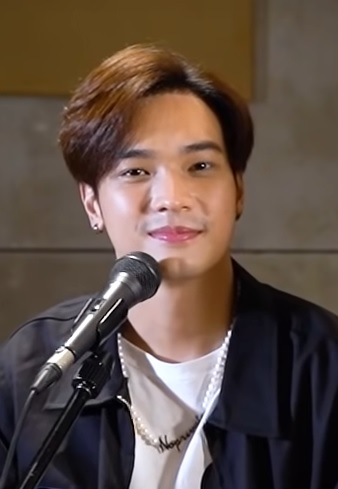
- Oabnithi in 2020
- Born: Oabnithi Wiwattanawarang; 2 August 1994 (age 32); Bangkok, Thailand
- Other name: Oab (โอบ)
- Education: Thammasat University
- Occupation: Actor
- Years active: 2012–present
- Height: 1.74 m (5 ft 8 1/2 in)

Oabnithi Wiwattanawarang (Thai: โอบนิธิ วิวรรธนวรางค์; born 2 August 1994), nicknamed Oab, is a Thai actor. He has appeared in The Blue Hour (2015), I Hate You I Love You (2016), Project S: The Series (2017), and Inhuman Kiss (2019).

== Early life and education ==
Oabnithi was born on 2 August 1994. He is the son of Somchai Wiwattanawarang and Duangporn Wiwattanawarang. He has an older sister named Kunnit Wiwattanawarang (nickname Eye) and one younger sister named Nichakul Wiwattanawarang (nickname Ice). Oabnithi graduated high school from Wat Rajabopit School and graduated with a bachelor's degree from Faculty of Economics at Thammasat University.

Oabnithi, as a child, likes to play sports with his favorite sport is tennis. He had the opportunity to compete and win prizes in small competitions including being in the top 100 of Thailand in the age category under 14 years old.

== Career ==
Oabnithi began in the entertainment industry when he met a scout talent at Bangkok BTS Skytrain who persuaded him to film an advertisement. After that, the music video director had the opportunity to watch Oabnithi's commercial audition tape and was interested. Oabnithi therefore starred in the first music video for the song "You Win" of FiFi BLAKE in 2012 and became more famous for his role as Jack in the teen series Hormones: The Series in 2013.

He was widely known and nominated for many awards for his role as Phum in the movie The Blue Hour (2015), starring opposite Atthaphan Phunsawat and again famous for his role as Ai in the series I Hate You, I Love You (2016), as well as his role as Noi in the movie Inhuman Kiss (2019).

== Filmography ==
=== Films ===
| Year | Title | Role | Notes |
|---|---|---|---|
| 2015 | The Blue Hour | Phum | Main role |
| 2017 | Gift | Don | Main role |
| 2019 | Inhuman Kiss | Noi | Main role |
| 2020 | Fast Love | Ken | Main role |

=== Television series ===
| Year | Title | Role | Notes |
|---|---|---|---|
| 2013 | Hormones: The Series | Jack | Supporting role |
| 2014 | Hormones: The Series Season 2 | Jack | Supporting role |
| 2014 | ThirTEEN Terrors | Phum | Main role |
| 2015 | Malee the Series | Sun | Main role |
| 2015 | Nang Rai Tee Rak | Pipat | Supporting role |
| 2016 | Yoo Tee Rao | Kan | Main role |
| 2016 | I Hate You, I Love You | Ai | Main role |
| 2017 | Project S: The Series | Puen | Main role |
| 2017 | Secret Seven | Gent | Main role |
| 2017 | Love Songs Love Series: Rueng Tee Koh | Sky | Main role |
| 2018 | Love Songs Love Series To Be Continued: Rueng Tee Koh | Sky | Main role |
| 2018 | Social Syndrome | Pond | Main role |
| 2019 | Ruk Mai Leum | Bank | Main role |
| 2019 | My Dear Warrior | Hoshi | Main role |
| 2019 | The Stranded | Joey | Main role |
| 2020 | Club Sapan Fine | Ang | Main role |
| 2020 | Quarantine Stories | Neung | Main role |
| 2021 | Blackout | Billy | Main role |
| 2021 | I Promised You the Moon | Jai | Supporting role |
| 2021 | The Mind Game | Napat | Main role |
| 2022 | Love You My Arrogance 2 | Tul | Main role |
| 2022 | Club Sapan Fine 2 | Ang | Main role |
| 2023 | This I Promise You | Kenji | Main role |
| 2023 | Forbidden | Top | Main role |
| 2024 | Blondie in an Ancient Time | Kla | Main role |
| 2026 | A Dog and A Plane | Lion | Supporting role |
