= P-047 =

- Film poster
- Directed by: Kongdej Jaturanrasmee
- Written by: Kongdej Jaturanrasmee
- Produced by: Soros Sukhum; Kongdej Jaturanrasmee
- Starring: Apichai Tragoolpadetgrai; Prinya Ngamwongwarn; Wanarat Kaiyasit
- Cinematography: Umpornpol Yugala
- Edited by: Manussa Vorasingha; Kamontorn Eakwattanakij
- Music by: Chaibandit Peuchponsub; Apichet Kambhu
- Production company: Song Sound
- Release date: 8 September 2011 (Venice Film Festival)
- Running time: 98 minutes
- Country: Thailand
- Language: Thai

P-047, also known as Tae Peang Phu Deaw (Thai: แต่เพียงผู้เดียว), is a 2011 Thai drama film, directed as well as written by Kongdej Jaturanrasmee, that premiered at the 2011 Venice Film Festival.

== Story ==
Lek is a locksmith, who have never cared about his left and never met the love. He worked with Kong, a bookseller who is going to be fired. Kong had a first love with the song when he is university students. Lek and Kong decided to open the door and come into the rooms during the day when the other person goes to work. They found some secret of their likes and some stuff until they found the room where an undisclosed secret of love and it is a cause of unexpected happen is occurring. Lek wakes up in hospital while everyone calls him “Kong”. He recuperates in hospital and often sneaks away to smoking at rooftop terrace and met a new friend. She is Aoi, a girl who like smells the steel chain for falling back to the past again. She always walks around the hospital and pick the canister for smell. Lek and Aoi stay on deck for talking about the story of the peacock in the last day before Lek departs.

Lek waited until nobody live in the room. He enters to the room and start to find secret again but this time, it is room of Kong. He perceives about feeling, thinking and some secret. Then all of the thing that Lek founded it turn back to him and make him like a new person. One day he met a girl in the dream of Kong. She holds a white umbrella and wears a pink suit like he said. But in this time Kong is not here.

== Production ==
The project was initially financed by a three million baht grant from the Ministry of Culture's Thai Khem Khang stimulus program. Additional funding came from corporate sponsors such as Krathing Dang and Takaab, a maker of herbal cough remedies.

== Festivals ==
P-047 was shown at many film festivals, including the Venice Film Festival, Busan Film Festival, and the Dubai Film Festival.

At the 6th iteration of the Five Flavours Film Festival in Warsaw, Poland, P-047 won Best Picture.
