= The Story of Nampoo =

1984 film

- Film poster
- Directed by: Euthana Mukdasanit
- Screenplay by: Euthana Mukdasanit
- Based on: The Story of Nampoo by Suwanni Sukhontha
- Starring: Rewat Buddhinan; Amphol Lumpoon
- Cinematography: Somchai Leenanurak
- Edited by: Banjong Kosallawat
- Production company: Five Star Production
- Release date: 7 June 1984
- Running time: 130 minutes
- Country: Thailand
- Language: Thai

The Story of Nampoo (Thai: น้ำพุ) is a 1984 Thai drama film directed by Euthana Mukdasanit. It is based on the book of the same name (known in Thai as เรื่องของน้ำพุ) by Suwanni Sukhontha. The film was selected as the Thai entry for the Best Foreign Language Film at the 57th Academy Awards, but was not accepted as a nominee.

== Plot ==
The story focuses around Nampoo, the son of the writer Suwanni Sukhontha, and his struggles with drug addiction, which eventually lead to his death.

== Cast ==
- Rewat Buddhinan
- Amphol Lumpoon as Nampoo
- Patravadi Sritrairat
- Wasamon Watharodom

== See also ==
- List of submissions to the 57th Academy Awards for Best Foreign Language Film
- List of Thai submissions for the Academy Award for Best Foreign Language Film
