= The Blue Hour (2015 film) =

- Film poster
- Directed by: Anucha Boonyawatana
- Written by: Anucha Boonyawatana; Waasuthep Ketpetch
- Produced by: Anucha Boonyawatana; Areeya Cheeweewat; Donsaron Kovitvanitcha; Kaneenut Ruengrujira; Puchong Tuntisungwaragul; Vijjapat Kojiw
- Starring: Oabnithi Wiwattanawarang; Atthaphan Phunsawat; Duangjai Hirunsri
- Cinematography: Chaiyapreuk Chalermpornpanit; Kamolpan Ngiwtong
- Edited by: Chonlasit Upanigkit; Anuphap Autta
- Music by: Chapavich Temnitikul
- Distributed by: Reel Suspects; G Village; 185º Equator
- Release date: 9 February 2015 (Berlin)
- Running time: 97 minutes
- Country: Thailand
- Language: Thai

The Blue Hour (Thai: อนธการ; RTGS: Onthakan) is a 2015 Thai horror film directed by Anucha Boonyawatana. It was screened in the Panorama section of the 65th Berlin International Film Festival.

== Plot ==
This gay romance-horror tells a story of a bullied teenager Tam (Atthaphan Phunsawat) who befriends and has a sexual relationship with a mysterious gay boy Phum (Oabnithi Wiwattanawarang) at a haunted abandoned pool. Their affair starts out as a romance but, later, shifts to a darker territory.

== Cast ==
- Oabnithi Wiwattanawarang
- Atthaphan Phunsawat
- Duangjai Hiransri
- Panutchai Kittisatima
- Nithiroj Simkamtom

== See also ==
- List of lesbian, gay, bisexual or transgender-related films of 2015
