= Suwanni Sukhontha =

Thai writer and novelist

Suwanni Sukhontha สุวรรณี สุคนธา
- Born: Suwanni Sukhonthiang (สุวรรณี สุคนธ์เที่ยง); 1 March 1932; Phitsanulok, Thailand
- Died: 3 February 1984 (aged 51); Bangkok, Thailand
- Education: BFA
- Alma mater: Silpakorn University
- Occupations: Government officer, writer, novelist
- Spouse(s): Tawee Nandakwang (ทวี นันทขว้าง)
- Children: Wongmueang Nandakwang (วงศ์เมือง นันทขว้าง) or Namphu (น้ำพุ); Duangta Nandakwang (ดวงตา นันทขว้าง) or Kop (กบ), later changing her first name to Menat (เมนาท); and two other daughters
- Writing career
- Pen name: Suwanni Sukhontha (สุวรรณี สุคนธา)
- Language: Thai
- Genres: Drama, education, historical fiction, humour, political satire, realistic fiction, romance, scientific fiction, tragedy
- Notable awards: 1971 SEATO Literature Award

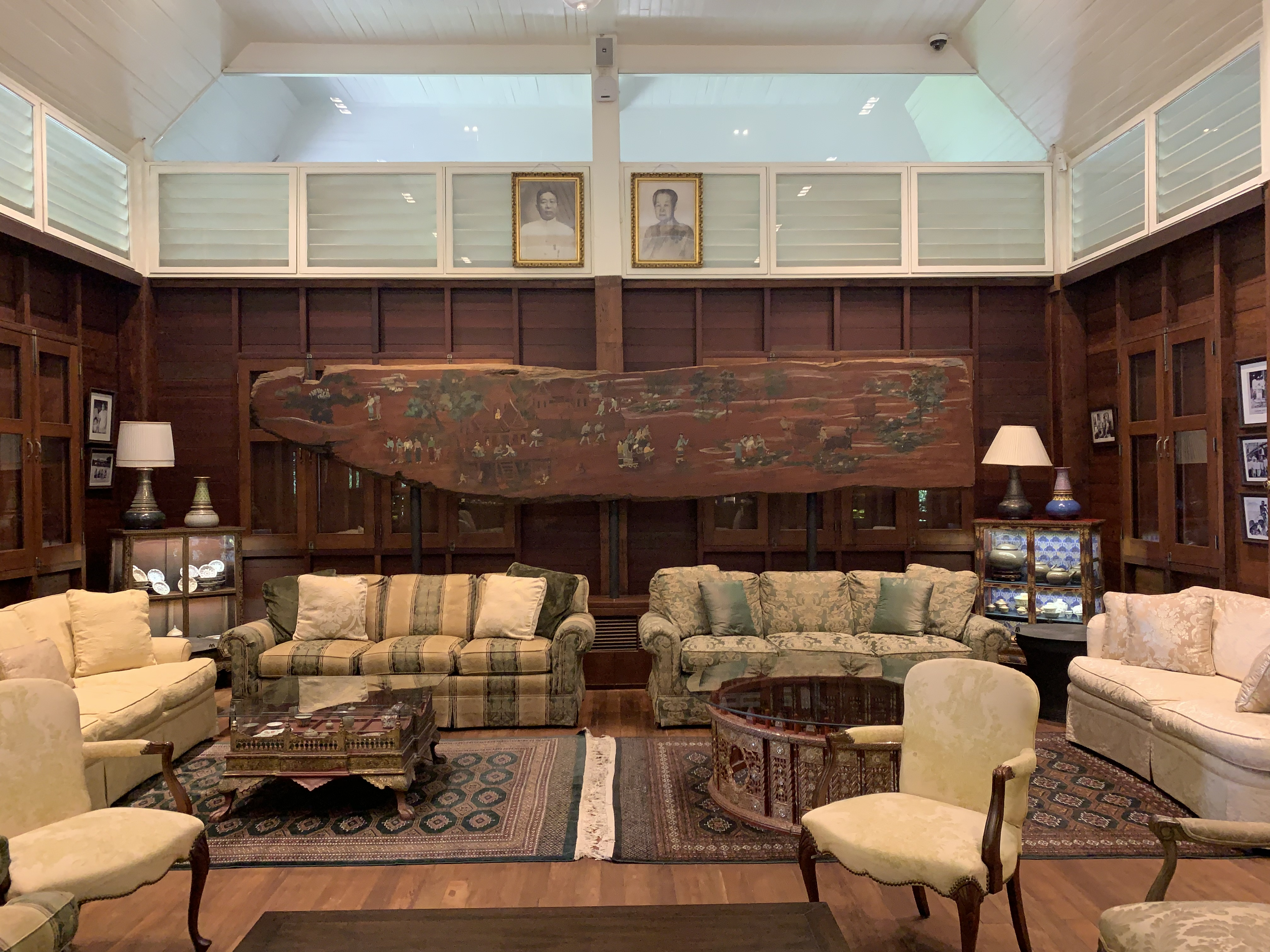
An artwork (centre) by Suwanni, displayed at Nai Lert Park Heritage Home

Suwanni Sukhontha (Thai: สุวรรณี สุคนธา) was the pen name of Suwanni Sukhonthiang (Thai: สุวรรณี สุคนธ์เที่ยง; 1 March 1932 – 3 February 1984), a Thai writer and novelist. In 1971, she won the SEATO Literature Award, the award which has been succeeded by the S.E.A. Write Award after the dissolution of the SEATO.

== Life ==
=== Education and careers ===
Suwanni was born in Phitsanulok Province, Thailand. Her father, Yoi Sukhonthiang (ย้อย สุคนธ์เที่ยง), was a medical officer. Her mother was Taeng-on Sukhonthiang (แตงอ่อน สุคนธ์เที่ยง). Suwanni had one elder brother.

Suwanni completed primary education at Phadung Nari–Kawi Phitthaya School (โรงเรียนผดุงนารี–กวีพิทยา) and secondary education at Chaloem Khwan Satri School (โรงเรียนเฉลิมขวัญสตรี) in Phitsanulok Province. She then studied at the Pohchang Academy of Arts (วิทยาลัยเพาะช่าง) in Bangkok for two years. Following that, she studied painting at the Faculty of Painting, Sculpture, and Graphic Arts, Silpakorn University, and completed a bachelor's degree in this field in 1951.

After graduation, she became a government officer, working as a government teacher at Bangkok's School of Arts for three years and as a lecturer at Silpakorn University in the 1950s. She began writing novels in 1965. In that year, her first short story, Chot Mai Thueng Puk, was published in Siam Rath Weekly (SRW) and she started using the pen name "Suwanni". She later changed her pen name to "Suwanni Sukhontha" upon suggestion of Pramun Unhathup (ประมูล อุณหธูป), SRW editor-in-chief.

Her first novel, Sai Bo Yut Sane Hai, was published in the magazine Satri San (สตรีสาร; "Females' Journal") and met with jubilant welcome. She then resigned from the government post at Silpakorn University and became a full-time writer. She also started a female magazine called Lalana (ลลนา; "Girls") in 1972 and later became its editor-in-chief.

=== Family ===
Suwanni married Tawee Nandakwang (ทวี นันทขว้าง; RTGS: Thawi Nantha-khwang), a National Artist who was her fellow lecturer at Silpakorn University. The two had four children. Because of frequent quarrels, they later divorced.

Following the divorce, Suwanni spent her life with her longtime friend, Sirisawat Phanthumasut (ศิริสวัสดิ์ พันธุมสุต). When Suwanni and Tawee divorced, one of their children, Duangta Nandakwang (ดวงตา นันทขว้าง; RTGS: Duangta Nantha-khwang) or Kop (กบ), had just been born. The children were then sent to Chiang Mai Province to live with their grandparents. The family discord also distanced Suwanni and her only son, Wongmueang Nandakwang (วงศ์เมือง นันทขว้าง; RTGS: Wongmueang Nantha-khwang) or Namphu (น้ำพุ), who saw his family as broken and resorted to narcotic drugs. Namphu died of narcotic drug overdose at the age of 18 in 1974.

After the death of Namphu, Suwanni said she had frequently been asked how she could allow her son to become addicted to drugs and such question had always rendered her speechless. Because of her son's death, she also blamed herself for being "incapable of raising a child". Suwanni later adapted his story into a novel called Phra Chan Si Nam Ngoen as a lesson for other parents. In its preface, she wrote:

"When I kissed you for the last time, our tears blended together. I told you to rest in peace, my dear. From that day on, I live my spiritless life like a wind-up toy. Today, I have just learnt the greatness of the suffering of a mother."

The novel has been adapted into films and television dramas for many times. It also made the term "problem child" (เด็กมีปัญหา) popular in the Thai society and called attention to family and drug problems.

=== Death ===
Around 16:30 hours of 3 February 1984, Suwanni was stabbed to death by two young men on her way to a market in Bangkok. The two men, Khachin Sombun (คชินทร์ สมบูรณ์) and Phaithun Sawangphrai (ไพฑูรย์ สว่างไพร), were technical school students and were addicted to narcotic drugs. They wanted to steal her BMW car and seek some money to purchase drugs. Suwanni's dead body was found left in dense grasses behind Siam Park City and eight stab wounds were found on the body. The two students were arrested on 4 February 1984.

Because of her death, Suwanni left the novel Wan Wan incomplete. Novelist Kritsana Asoksin (กฤษณา อโศกสิน) later completed it.

== Writings ==
Suwanni's works are well known for their realistic structure. She is noted for using a common but sarcastic language in her works, contrary to the style popular at that time. The characters she created are usually ordinary people and reflect the downsides of human beings. Suwanni is also renowned for profound understanding of female psyche and her use of "brush stroke" to create rich imagery.

The following is an incomplete list of her works:

- Bang Thi Phrung Ni Cha Plian Chai (บางทีพรุ่งนี้จะเปลี่ยนใจ; "Maybe I Would Change My Mind Tomorrow")
- Chaem Sai (แจ่มใส; "Bright")
- Chamon (จามร)
- Chan Rak Krung Thep (ฉันรักกรุงเทพฯ; "I Love Bangkok")
- Chan Rai Saeng (จันทร์ไร้แสง; "Lightless Moon")
- Chot Mai Chak Rom (จดหมายจากโรม; "A Letter from Rome")
- Chot Mai Thueng Puk (จดหมายถึงปุก; "A Letter to Puk")
- Chum Num Rueang Fueang Chak Chum Atit Thi Lawaek Thanon Na Phra Lan (ชุมนุมเรื่องเฟื่องจากชุมอาร์ติสท์ที่ละแวกถนนหน้าพระลาน; "A Collection of Daydream Stories from a Club of Artists at Na Phra Lan Road")
- Duean Dap Thi Sop Tha (เดือนดับที่สบทา; "Night Falls at Sop Tha")
- Dok Mai Nai Pa Daet (ดอกไม้ในป่าแดด; "A Flower in a Sun Forest")
- Duai Pik Khong Rak (ด้วยปีกของรัก; "With the Wings of Love") – The novel won the National Book Weeks Award in 1973
- Itthiphet (อิตถีเพศ; "The Female")
- Kao-i Khao Nai Hong Daeng (เก้าอี้ขาวในห้องแดง; "A White Chair in a Red Room")
- King Fa (กิ่งฟ้า; "Legs of Heaven")
- Kitchakam Chai Sot (กิจกรรมชายโสด; "What Single Men Do")
- Khao Chue Kan (เขาชื่อกานต์;"His Name Was Kan")
  A story about Kan, a newly graduated medical student who decided to serve as a physician in a rural city in Northern Thailand where law existed but could not be enforced because of rampant corruption and discrimination. Kan quickly gained popularity and respect amongst rural people owing to his efforts in enhancing their life qualities, much to the dismay of local officers. Kan's idealistic work caused the womanly desires of his young wife, Haruethai (หฤทัย), to completely be ignored by him. Haruethai was later injured in a car accident in Bangkok and Kan went to look after her. When Kan returned to the city, he was shot dead by two minions of the district chief officer who believed that his immediate dismissal came because Kan went to Bangkok to reveal his misconduct. The novel won the SEATO Literature Award in 1971. The novel has been translated into Japanese by Yūjirō Iwaki (岩城雄次郎) under the title Sononaha Kān (その名はカーン).
- Khon Roeng Mueang (คนเริงเมือง; "She Who Enjoys the City")
  With the political conditions of Thailand during the 1930s to 1970s as subtext, especially the overthrow of absolute monarchy, the nationalist reform by Plaek Phibunsongkram, and the rise of military dictatorship; the novel tells the story of Phring (พริ้ง), a girl who had badly been raised by her elder sister. Phring grew up to be a selfish woman who only lived for money and her own happiness, without considering the right or wrong.
- Khwam Rak Khong Sunthriya (ความรักของสุนทรียา; "Sunthriya's Love Story")
- Khwam Rak Khrang Sut Thai (ความรักครั้งสุดท้าย; "Last Love")
- Khuen Nao Thi Luea Dao Pen Phuean (คืนหนาวที่เหลือแต่ดาวเป็นเพื่อน; "Stars Are My Only Friends on this Cold Night")
- Khuen Ni Mai Mi Phra Chan (คืนนี้ไม่มีพระจันทร์; "No Moon Tonight")
- Luk Rak (ลูกรัก; "My Beloved Son")
- Mae Si Bangkok (แม่ศรีบางกอก; "She is the Grace of Bangkok")
  A romantic comedy and scientific fiction satirising Bangkok. The main character, Saosi (สาวศรี), was an attractive girl and was in romantic relationships with two men at the same time. Both men had just earned doctoral degrees in medicine. Saosi was later brought to "another planet" by an extraterrestrial being, named Thawichat (ทวิชาติ), and she married him. When she returned to Bangkok, she found that fifty years had passed since her departure and all of her relatives and friends had died. She later discovered that she had been given immortality by Thawichat. Although a great deal of time had passed and the advanced technology was everywhere, Saosi found that Bangkok was still full of sins, selfishness, and discrimination. Because of immortality, she became bored of her life. She then threw herself out of a window in order to commit suicide, but she could not die. The novel ends with Saosi sitting on the floor where she fell onto and crying, as she missed the aging and death.
- Maya (มายา; "Delusion")
- Ngu Rong Hai Dok Mai Yim (งูร้องไห้ ดอกไม้ยิ้ม; "A Crying Snake and a Smiling Flower")
- Phayap Daet (พยับแดด; "Overcast")
- Phra Chan Si Nam Ngoen (พระจันทร์สีน้ำเงิน; "Once in a Blue Moon")
  The story about the conflicts in Suwanni's family which led to the death of her son, Namphu. The novel won the National Book Weeks Award in 1976.
- Phrung Ni Chan Cha Rak Khun (พรุ่งนี้ฉันจะรักคุณ; "And I Will Love You Tomorrow")
- Phu Ying Khon Nan Chue Sela (ผู้หญิงคนนั้นชื่อเสลา; "That Woman's Name Is Sela")
- Rueang Khong Ket (เรื่องของเกด; "Ket's Account")
- Sai Bo Yut Sane Hai (สายบ่หยุดเสน่ห์หาย; "Fragrance Is Still Strong in Mid-morning")
- Sam Ngao (สามเงา; "Three Shadows")
- Soi Saeng Daeng (สร้อยแสงแดง; "Vermilion Bracelet")
  The conflicts within a family told through the eyes of a chicken raised by the family, Chiap (เจี๊ยบ, meaning "chirp"). Chiap has beautiful feathers around its neck, looking like the Vermilion Bracelet, a chicken in the ancient tragic poem, Lilit Phra Lo (ลิลิตพระลอ); hence came the name of the novel. The novel won the National Book Weeks Award in 1973.
- Soi Salap Si (สร้อยสลับสี; "Multicoloured Bracelet")
- Soi Sawat (สร้อยสวาท; "Chains of Love")
- Suan Sat (สวนสัตว์; "The Zoo")
  A collection of short stories published in Lalana magazine, based upon the animals raised by Suwanni who said that these animals were a recollection of warm happiness in olden days. The book is now used for education in Thai secondary and tertiary education institutions. It has also been translated into Japanese by Mineko Yoshioka (吉岡峯子) under the title Sārapī no Saku Kisetsu (サーラピーの咲く季節). The short stories are:
  - Chao Wan A-thit (เช้าวันอาทิตย์; "Sunday Morning"),
  - Saraphi Duean Kumpha (สารภีเดือนกุมภาฯ; "Saraphi Flowers in February"),
  - Hua Ta-kua (หัวตะกั่ว; "Blue Panchax"),
  - Si Thong (สีทอง; "Golden");
  - Khwam Fan (ความฝัน; "Dream"),
  - Nam Thuam (น้ำท่วม; "Flood"),
  - Nam Phueng Thi Nai Phra Chan (น้ำผึ้งที่ในพระจันทร์; "Honey in the Moon"),
  - Mo Bunkhong Kap I Khiao (หมอบุญคองกับไอ้เขียว; "Doctor Bunkhong and The Green"),
  - Mai Mi Wan Nan (ไม่มีวันนั้น; "That Day Won't Come"), and
  - Siang Riak Chak Mae Nam (เสียงเรียกจากแม่น้ำ; "A Cry from the River").
- Thale Rue Im (ทะเลฤๅอิ่ม; "How Could the Sea Be Enough?")
- Thanon Sai Rommani (ถนนสายรมณีย์; "A Road to Amusement")
- Thong Phrakai Saet (ทองประกายแสด; "Gold Whose Shine Is Orange")
- Wan Wan (วันวาร; "Yesterday")
- Wotka Lae Khawia (ว้อดก้าและคาร์เวียร์; "Vodka and Cavia")

== In popular culture ==
Many of her novels have been adapted into films and television dramas. These include:

- Kao-i Khao Nai Hong Daeng, adapted into dramas in 1984, 1999, and 2013.
- Khao Chue Kan, adapted into films in 1973 and 1988 as well as dramas in 1980 and 2010.
- Khon Roeng Mueang, adapted into film in 1980 and dramas in 1988, 2002, and 2017. In both 1988 and 2002 versions, Mai Charoenpura played as the main character, Phring.
- Khwam Rak Khrang Sut Thai, adapted into films in 1975 and 2003.
- Kitchakam Chai Sot, adapted into dramas in 1999.
- Phra Chan Si Nam Ngoen, adapted into film in 1984 and dramas in 1995 and 2002. In the 1984 film adaption, Amphol Lumpoon played as Namphu and won the 29th Asia-Pacific Film Festival Award for Best Actor as well as the Thai Oscar for Best Actor. The 1984 film was also the most popular and highest grossing Thai film of the year, earning a total of 15 million baht.
- Phrung Ni Chan Cha Rak Khun, adapted into dramas in 1972, 1980, 1982, 1989, 1993, and 1999.
- Thale Rue Im, adapted into drama in 2003.
- Thong Prakai Saet, adapted into drama for six times: twice in 1974, 1981, 1988, 2001, and 2012, respectively.

In several television dramas, Suwanni was notably portrayed by actress Sinjai Plengpanich. Suwanni was also portrayed by Patravadi Mejudhon in the 1984 film adaption of Phra Chan Si Nam Ngoen.
