= Sorapong Chatree =

Thai film actor (1949–2022)

- สรพงษ์ ชาตรี
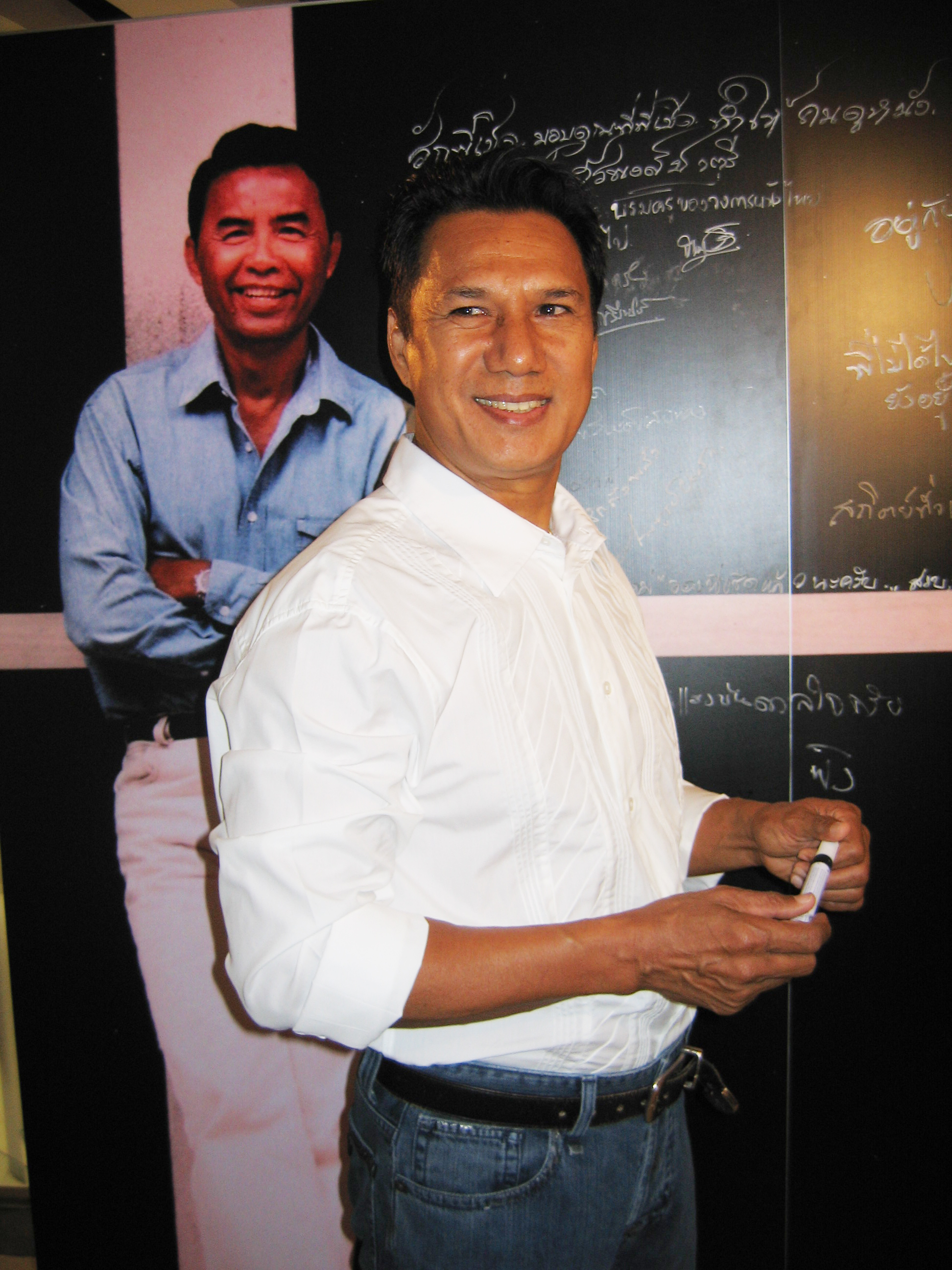
- Chatree in 2007
- Born: Pittaya Tiamswate; 8 December 1949; Maha Rat, Ayutthaya, Thailand
- Died: 10 March 2022 (aged 72); Bangkok, Thailand
- Occupations: Film actor, Singer
- Years active: 1970–2021
- Spouses: Pimchan Jaiwong (divorced); Duangduaen Jithaisong
- Children: 4 (2 daughters, 2 sons)
- Awards: National Artist; Suphannahong National Film Awards

Kripong Tiamswate (Thai: กรีพงศ์ เทียมเศวต, RTGS: Kriphong Thiamsawet; born Pittaya Tiamswate; 8 December 1949 – 10 March 2022), known professionally as Sorapong Chatree (Thai: สรพงษ์ ชาตรี, RTGS: Soraphong Chatri), was a Thai film actor. He frequently starred in the films of Prince Chatrichalerm Yukol, as well as in Cherd Songsri's classic romance, Plae Kao.

== Biography ==
He was born in Tambon Tha To (later separated into Tambon Ban Mai), Maha Rat district, Phra Nakhon Si Ayutthaya Province. He was the youngest of three children, with an older brother and an older sister. In the past, his house was regarded as the only house in the community with a television set.

Chatree became one of the top male stars by the mid-1970s, eventually displacing the older Sombat Metanee from the lead position. As he aged, he retained his popularity until the end of his life. He maintained his popularity and was known as a key supporting actor.

Apart from acting, he also released five studio albums with two major labels, RS Promotion and Nititad Promotion, between 1990 and 1997.

He also voiced Woody from Toy Story trilogy and Agent K from Men in Black II in Thai dub.

In 2001, construction began on Wat Luang Phor Toh in Sikhio Town. Chatree provided major funding for the temple and participated in many of its Buddhist engagements.

He was named a National Artist of Thailand in 2009. His hometown was transformed into a museum and cultural tourism destination, which exhibits his life.

Chatree died from lung cancer at Bumrungrad Hospital in Bangkok, on 10 March 2022, at the age of 71.

== Selected filmography ==
- Ninja Destroyer (1970)
- Out of the Darkness (1971)
- The Hotel Angel (1974)
- Grounded God (1975)
- Diamond (1976)
- 1 2 3 Duan Mahaphai (1 2 3 Monster Express) (1977)
- Mafia Defeated (1977)
- Plae Kao (The Scar) (1979)
- The Mountain Lion (1979)
- From Bangkok with Love (1982)
- Angkor: Cambodia Express (1982)
- Gunman Mue puen (1983)
- The Refugee (1983)
- One Man Show (1984)
- Cobra Thunderbolt (1984)
- Freedom of Taxi Driver (Citizen II) (1984)
- Top Secret (1985)
- Krai Thong (1985)
- Raiders of the Doomed Kingdom (After the Fall of Saigon)
- The Ultimate Ninja (1986)
- Operation Vietnam (1987)
- Khon Liang Chang (The Elephant Keeper) (1987)
- Black Warrior (1988)
- The Lost Idol (1990)
- Salween (Gunman 2) (1993)
- Sia Dai (Daughter) (1996)
- Long June (1996)
- Sia Dai 2 (Daughter 2) (1997)
- The Legend of Suriyothai (2001)
- Saving Private Tootsie (Prom Chompoo) (2002)
- Takian (2003)
- Beautiful Boxer (2003)
- The Sin (2004)
- Khao Chon Kai (2007)
- King Naresuan (2007)
- Queens of Langkasuka (2008)
- Ong Bak 2 (2008)
- Phuket (Shot-2009)
- Yamada: The Samurai of Ayothaya (2010)
- Bangkok Knockout (2010)
- Panthai Norasing (2015)
- The Legend of King Naresuan: The Series - A Hongsawadee's Hostages (2017)
- The Legend of King Naresuan: The Series - Reclaiming Sovereignty (2018)
- Wat Sorapong (2021)

== Appearances in Hong Kong films ==
In the 1980s and early 1990s, the international rights to many of films featuring Sorapong were obtained by the Hong Kong production companies IFD and Filmark. The films were then edited and newly-shot footage added (often featuring ninja directed by Godfrey Ho) to produce a movie more easily marketed to the Western market. In general IFD productions credit Sorapong and no other Thai actors, while Filmark's credit only the western actors, although more than two-thirds of the film is of Thai origin.

== Awards and honors ==
Sorapong was appointed Member (Fifth Class) of the Order of the Crown of Thailand in 1981 and Companion (Fourth Class) of the Order of the Direkgunabhorn in 2009.
