= International Association of Theatre Critics =

The International Association of Theatre Critics (IATC) is a non-profit non-government organization that is an arm of United Nations Educational, Scientific and Cultural Organization. Founded in Paris in 1956, deriving from the Theatre of Nations (Théâtre des Nations), the organization's purpose is to encourage and promote theatre criticism, protect the interests of critics, and enhance comprehension between cultures. The IATC holds bi-annual young critics' seminars and an international convention of professional critics every two years. Additionally, the organization periodically offers symposiums, and other international events.

IATC's official languages are English and French. The association's place of incorporation is Paris. Its current president is Jeffrey Eric Jenkins.

The organization membership is largely made up of a little over 50 national critics groups, such as the American Theatre Critics Association and the Critics Circle of London. Individuals may also join who are in a country without a national organization. Historically the organization has served as mediator between adversarial critics' groups (such as critics outside of government arts ministries being at odds with those inside those ministries), and as a means for critics divided by political barriers to congregate (such as United States and Russian critics meeting during the Cold War).
