= Soros Sukhum =

Thai film producer

Soros Sukhum is a Thai film producer.

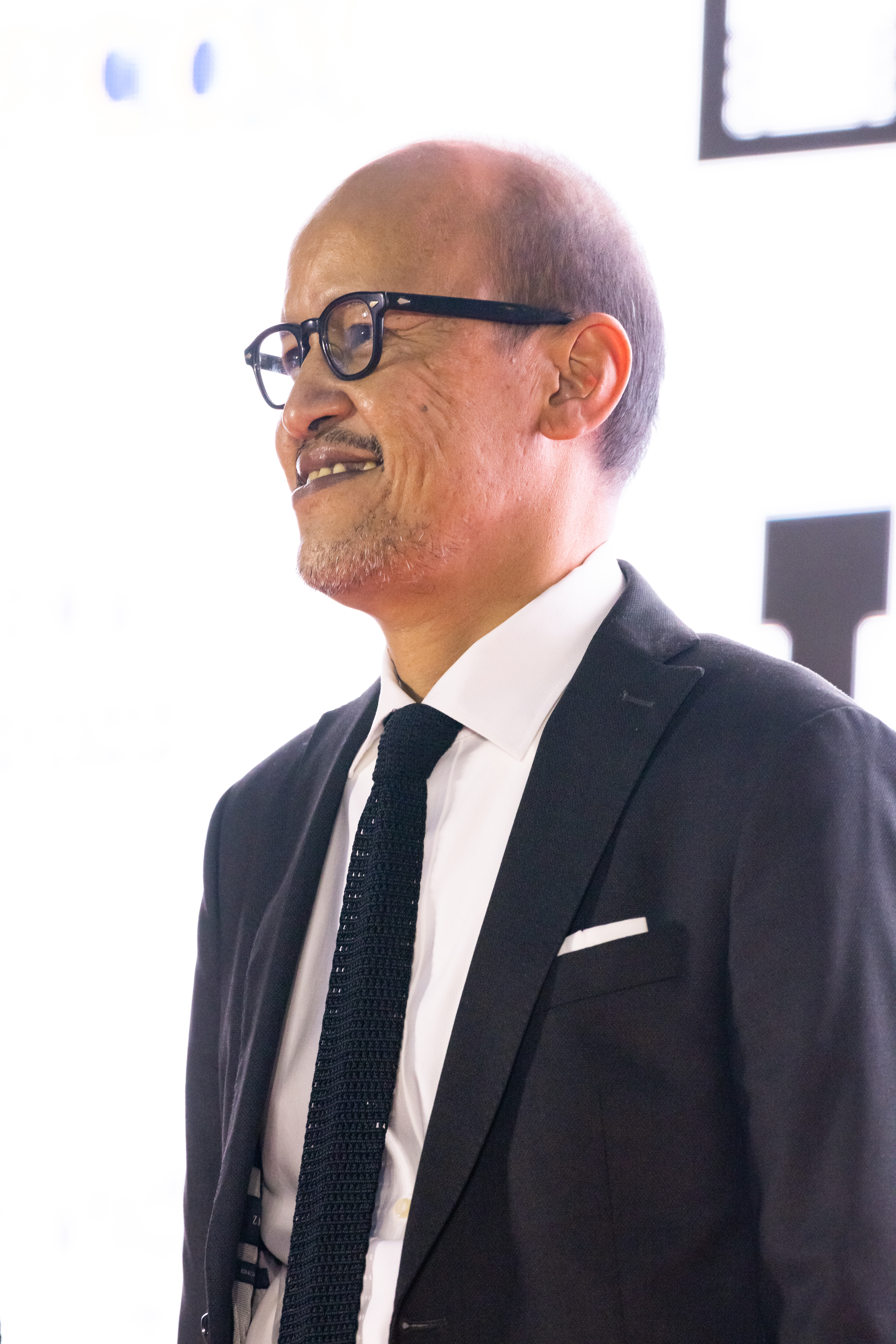
Soros Sukhum in 2022

== Partial filmography ==
- Wonderful Town (2007)
- P-047 (2011)
- Diamond Island (2016)
- Pop Aye (2017)
- Ten Years Thailand (2018)
- Memoria (2021)
- Hunger (2023)
- Morte Cucina (2025)
- A Useful Ghost (2025)

== Awards ==
- 2018 Silpathorn Award in Film
- 2020 FIAPF Award
