= Muay Thai in popular culture =

The combat sport of Muay Thai has been featured in media, including film, television, manga, anime and video games. It gained international attention when Yodtong Senanan led the Nak Muay Team against Osamu Noguchi's Kickboxer Team on October 16, 1972. It has heavily influenced the sport of kickboxing, and is used in mixed martial arts (MMA), where athletes train in its techniques.

== Film ==
Muay Thai has been featured in the following films:

Movie	Year	Description	Ref.
Duel of Fists	1971	A Hong Kong engineer (David Chiang) goes to Thailand to find his long-lost half-brother (Ti Lung), who is a Muay Thai boxer.	
The Man with the Golden Gun	1974	Later in the film, James Bond (Roger Moore) goes to the Lumpinee Boxing Stadium, where he meets the main antagonist Scaramanga (Christopher Lee).	
Bloodsport	1988	Martial arts movie about an underground fighting tournament, starring Jean-Claude Van Damme in his break-through role. The film features a formidable Muay Thai Fighter named Paco, played by a career Thaiboxer Paulo Tocha, who serves Van Damme's opponent in the tournament's semi-finals.	
Kickboxer	1989	After his brother, an American heavyweight kickboxing champion, is crippled by a vicious Thaiboxer Tong Po (Michel Qissi) in the ring, Kurt Sloane (Jean-Claude Van Damme) seeks out an elusive Muay Thai Kru to teach him the art to avenge his brother.	
Death Cage (Zhan Long)	1989	While primarily a kung fu movie, the movie takes place in Thailand, where various scenes featuring Thaiboxers are present.	
The Quest	1996	Taking place in 1920s, Christopher Dubois (Jean-Claude Van Damme) ends up stowing way on a boat and ends up being imprisoned by the boat's men. He is later acquired by a mercenary Englishman, Lord Edgar Dobbs (Roger Moore), who sells Dubois into slavery on an island off the coast of Siam, where Dubois is trained in Muay Thai fighting. After six months, Dobbs and his partner Harry Smythe find Dubois fighting in a Muay Thai match and see that Dubois has become a skilled fighter. Thus, he is subsequently chosen by Lord Dobbs to participate in a grand martial arts tournament, held in the Lost City of Tibet.	
A Fighter's Blues (A Fu)	2000	Mong Fu (Andy Lau), a former Muay Thai boxer, returns to Thailand from Hong Kong and challenges the champion to a match.	
Beautiful Boxer	2003	The life story of Parinya Charoenphol (Asanee Suwan), who masters Muay Thai in order to realize her dream of becoming a woman.	
Ong-Bak: Muay Thai Warrior	2003	The series popularized Muay Thai, and featured some Muay Boran techniques. The film had two sequels: Ong Bak 2 (2008) and Ong Bak 3 (2010)	
Born to Fight	2004	Dan Chupong stars in the film.	
Chok-Dee: The Kickboxer	2005	The film is based on the life of Algerian-French Muay Thai boxer Dida Diafat, who stars as himself.	
Tom-Yum-Goong	2005	Tony Jaa, who starred in the movie and was also the fight choreographer, incorporates a Muay Thai style (มวยคชสาร, "muaykodchasarn", roughly translated as "Elephant Boxing"), which emphasizes grappling moves. The movie also showcased "Jaturongkabaht", which was used by the Royal Thai Bodyguards.	
Mercury Man	2006		
Undisputed II: Last Man Standing	2006		
Muay Thai Chaiya	2007	Is a film about two talented muay Thai boxers, boyhood friends whose lives take divergent paths after they arrive in Bangkok.	
Master KIMs	2007	The Nak Muay team appears in the final scene.	
Chocolate	2008	Muay Thai fighters Yanin Vismitananda and Lim Su-Jeong star in this film.	
Down for the Count (Aukmen)	2009	Muay Thai boxer Ahmad Al-Sulaiti appears as himself.	
Raging Phoenix	2009	Starring Yanin "Jeeja" Vismistananda, that movie is centered around the style of "Druken Muay Thai"	
The Kick	2011	A Korean family of Taekwondo experts immigrate to Thailand and are exposed to Muay Thai fighting.	
Bunohan: Return to Murder	2011		
Only God Forgives	2013	A Bangkok policeman and a gangster settle their differences in a Muay Thai match.	
Ip Man 3	2015	Ip Man engages in a fight with a Muay Thai fighter in an elevator when he and his wife were on their way home.	
Sha Po Lang II: A Time For Consequences	2015		
A Prayer Before Dawn	2017	The film is based on the true life experience of Billy Moore who survived his Thai prison ordeal by becoming a Muay Thai boxing champion.	
The Legend of Muay Thai: 9 Satra	2018	A Thai 3D computer-animated action-fantasy film.	
Shang Chi and the Legend of the Ten Rings	2021	Muay Thai was included in the fighting style of Shang Chi, the title character.	
Raya and the Last Dragon	2021	Namaari (Gemma Chan) uses a style based on muay Thai and krabi krabong.	

=== Documentaries ===
Movie	Year	Description	Ref.
Fight or Flight	2007	A documentary on Thailand's ring fighting circuit.	
Blessed With Venom	2011	A feature-length documentary chronicling the life and career of Australian Muay Thai superstar and 10 time World Champion, John Wayne Parr	
Lumpini	2018	A documentary that follows Kwankhao Mor.Ratanabandit and Saenchai, who fights at the final event at historic old Lumpinee stadium, also at the grand opening of the new Lumpinee stadium. Narrated by Stephen Haynes.	
Torn Cloth	2020	A documentary that follows a group of orphans in northern Thailand that take refuge in a Muay Thai boxing camp managed by Jawee Sukantha, and the improvements it makes to their lives. Narrated by Stephen Haynes. With a special guest appearance by Tony Jaa	

== Television ==
Muay Thai has been featured in television series from reality show contests to documentary episodes.

Television Show	Episode	Description	Ref.
Departures (TV series)		Justin Lukach enters a Muay Thai fight in one episode.	
The Contender Asia	series	A reality-based television series that follows 16 aspiring Muay Thai middleweight fighters from 12 countries as they compete in a series of outdoor challenges and sanctioned matches.	
Human Weapon	"Muay Thai"	The episode featured the history and fighting techniques of Muay Thai.	
True Life	"I'm a Muay Thai Fighter"	Kit Cope and Ben Garcia travel overseas to make their mark in the brutal world of Muay Thai ring fighting. They are scheduled to compete in bare-knuckle fights that will be broadcast on Thailand television.	
Fight Girls	series	A reality show similar to The Ultimate Fighter, where ten female fighters live together and train with a Muay Thai instructor in Las Vegas for six weeks in an effort to fight for a Muay Thai championship in Thailand.	
Fight Quest	"Thailand"	Jimmy Smith and Doug Anderson learn Muay Thai.	
Dhani Tackles the Globe	"Thailand"	Dhani Jones learns Muay Thai.	
Babylon 5	"TKO"	Michael Garibaldi and his friend Walker Smith participate in an alien-run tournament called the "Mutai".	
Gaki no Tsukai	–	The variety show features a "Thai Kick" punishment game where a boxer delivers a kick to the loser's backside.	
Real World/Road Rules Challenge	"The Ruins"	featured a "Muay Thai challenge" where contestants kicked bamboo sticks in an elimination round.	
Ring Girls	series	A reality show similar to The Ultimate Fighter, where ten female fighters live together and train with a Muay Thai instructor in Las Vegas for six weeks in an effort to fight for a Muay Thai championship in Thailand.	
Power Rangers/Juken Sentai Gekiranger	Power Rangers Jungle Fury season	Robert "R.J." James, the Jungle Fury Wolf Ranger who wears violet, is a Muay Thai practitioner. He wears prajed (dual elbow bands) uses elbow and knee attacks, including a flying knee strike.	
An Idiot Abroad	"Swim With Dolphins"	Karl Pilkington trains with a Muay Thai kickboxing group and later participates in a blindfolded match.	
Amphibia	Ivy on the Run	The show's protagonist, Thai-American Anne Boonchuy, is a Muay Thai practitioner. She states she was enrolled in lessons by her mother to fit her "spirited" personality (and get her out of her kitchen), and offers to teach her amphibian friends the martial art.	
Hurts Like Hell	series	A four-part series based on corruption in the Muay Thai industry, released on Netflix.	

== Manga and Animation ==
Manga and anime shows occasionally feature characters who use Muay Thai techniques:

Manga or Animation	Character(s)	Description	Ref.
Kick no Oni	Tadashi Sawamura, others	Fictionalized retelling of real-life Tadashi Sawamura's kickboxing career. Features Sawamura's fights against various kickboxers, including the fight against Thaiboxer Samarn Sor Adisorn.	
Tatakae!! Ramenman	Muay Thai Chūchai		
Dragon Ball	Draculaman, Pamput		
Attack on Titan	Female titan, Annie Leonhart		
Captain Tsubasa World Youth	Bunnaak Singprasert		
Karate Shōkōshi Kohinata Minoru	Samart Sarindu, Charndech Nham Sae Gym; Thanakorn Ammarath, Changnoi Jakkapong; Singsak, Thongchai; Junny Skeandelaki; SHIN "TEMUR" SHIRATO		
TOUGH: High School Iron Fist Legend	Kreangarg Suwanpakdee		
Kenichi: The Mightiest Disciple	Apachai Hopachai, Tirawit Kōkin; Agaard Jum Sai		
Beyblade	Yothin		
Hajime No Ippo	Jimmy Sispher		
Katekyo Hitman Reborn!	Lussuria		
All Rounder Meguru	Maki Kamiya	Manga about Women's MMA. One of the key characters is Maki Kamiya, a high school girl-age kickboxer who transitioned to Women's Shooto, after she was unable to find adequate challengers in her Kickboxing weight class.	
Treasure hunting in Thailand	Thani Sor.Silachai		
Kamen Rider Ryuki	Kamen Rider Impaler		
Kengan Ashura	Gaolang Wongsawat, Cosmo Imai		

== Video games ==
The following games feature characters that use Muay Thai as their fighting style,

Series	Game characters	Description	Ref.
Street Fighter	Sagat	Debuting in the original Street Fighter, Sagat is depicted as a renowned Muay Thai expert known for his incredible power and height. He is often called the "Emperor of Muay Thai" in his home country. He was possibly named after Sagat Petchyindee.	
Street Fighter	Adon	Muay Thai warrior and a disciple of Sagat. He appears in the original Street Fighter game as the second-to-last opponent before the final match against Sagat. In later games, he is characterized as a former pupil of Sagat, seeking to surpass his disgraced master.	
Street Fighter	Gou Hibiki and other minor characters	Muay Thai fighters from Street Fighter III: New Generation sometimes appear in Elena's stage during the 2nd round.	
SNK Fighting Games	Joe Higashi	Debuting in Fatal Fury: King of Fighters	
SNK Fighting Games	Hwa Jai	Debuting in Fatal Fury: King of Fighters, initially appearing as a computer-controlled opponent, unavailable for the player. He would be introduced as a playable character in The King of Fighters XIII.	
SNK Fighting Games	King	Debuting in Art of Fighting, a French female Muay Thai fighter who dresses in masculine manner. Her design was inspired by Saskia van Rijswijk and Grace Jones.	
SNK Fighting Games	Payak Sitipitak	Debuted in Buriki One	
Mortal Kombat	Jax Briggs	Uses Muay Thai in Mortal Kombat: Deadly Alliance and Mortal Kombat: Armageddon.	
Mortal Kombat	Jacqui Briggs	Daughter of Jax Briggs, she utilizes a more Muay Thai-oriented fighting style in Mortal Kombat 11.	
Virtua Fighter	Vanessa Lewis	In Virtua Fighter 4, Vanessa Lewis used both Vale Tudo and Muay Thai move sets until Brad Burns was added in Virtua Fighter 4: Evolution, making her solely a Vale Tudo fighter.	
Virtua Fighter	Brad Burns	Italian Thaiboxer who debuted in Virtua Fighter 4 Evolution.	
Tekken	Bruce Irvin	Debuted in Tekken 2.	
Tekken	Bryan Fury	Debuted in Tekken 3. Kickboxer who utilizes trademark Muay Thai moves in his arsenal.	
Tekken	Fahkumram	Debuted in Tekken 7 as DLC. Massive Muay Thai fighter. Upon his unveiling in 2019, he was compared to Street Fighter's Sagat.	
Tekken	Josie Rizal	Debuted in Tekken 7. Spiritual successor to Bruce Irvin, who fights with a Filipino variant of Muay Thai known as Yaw-Yan, combined with elements of Arnis.	
Tekken	Mimics, like Mokujin and Unknown	Unknown in the Tekken series can use any of the techniques of the other players, including the Muay Thai moves of Bruce Irvin and Mokujin.	
Dead or Alive	Zack	Introduced in Dead Or Alive. Zack uses self-learnt Muay Thai style.	
World Heroes	Shura (Naikanom Tom)	Debuted in World Heroes 2, he is based on the Nai Khanom Tom, a legendary figure in the historicity of Muay Thai.	
Fighter's History, Karnov's Revenge	Samchay Tomyamgun		
Ehrgeiz	Prince Naseem/Doza		
Eternal Champions	R.A.X. Coswell	R.A.X. Coswell is an American cyber-kickboxer from 2345 AD. His trainer programmed a virus into his R.A.X. exoskeleton software to ensure he lost an important match. Coswell died during the match as a result.	
Battle K-Road	Shinsaku Maekawa and John Anderson		
League of Legends	Lee Sin	Has a Muay Thai skin that changes his fighting stance to Muay Thai.	
Granado Espada	Irawan		
The Bouncer	PD-4		
World of Fighting (freeware)	Ananda		
Battle Arena Toshinden	Chaos (Note: Chaos, from Battle Arena Toshinden 2 and 3, wears Mongkhon when he fights.)		
Shaolin vs Wutang (1 & 2)	Muay Thai is one of the 30 available fighting styles in the game.		
Sleeping Dogs (video game)	Wei Shen	In the Zodiac Tournament Pack DLC the game introduces 12 Fire Opal Statue collectibles. Collection of all 12 statues unlocks two outfits, one of which is a traditional Muay Thai outfit. When equipped, Wei's fighting style then switches to Muay Thai.	
Judgment (video game) and its sequel Lost Judgment	Toru Higashi	Higashi is one of the protagonist's companions who fight by his side in several instances, most notably during the Long Battle sequences towards the end of the games. His moveset features elements from both Muay Thai and Tae Kwon Do.	

== Other ==
- Lumpini Gundam is a Gundam plastic model dressed in a Muay Thai outfit.
- Professional wrestler CM Punk uses a fighting style that incorporates elements of Muay Thai.
- Jamie, a Progressive Insurance associate who is considered dull by his coworkers, is revealed to be a devotee of Muay Thai (among other exciting pursuits) while showing slides of his vacation in a 2020 Progressive commercial.

== See also ==
- Capoeira in popular culture
- Lethwei in popular culture
