= Outline of martial arts =

Overview of and topical guide to martial arts

The following outline is provided as an overview of and topical guide to martial arts:

Martial arts – systems of codified practices and traditions of training for combat. While they may be studied for various reasons, martial arts share a single objective: to physically defeat other persons and to defend oneself or others from physical threat. In addition, some martial arts are linked to beliefs such as Hinduism, Buddhism, Taoism, Confucianism, Sikhism, Zoroastrianism, Jainism, Islam, Chinese folk religion, Korean shamanism, Vietnamese folk religion, or Shinto while others follow a particular code of honor. Many arts are also practised competitively, most commonly as combat sports, but may also take the form of dance.

== What type of thing are martial arts ==
- A form of combat
- Exercise
- Sports
  - Contact sports

== Types of martial arts ==
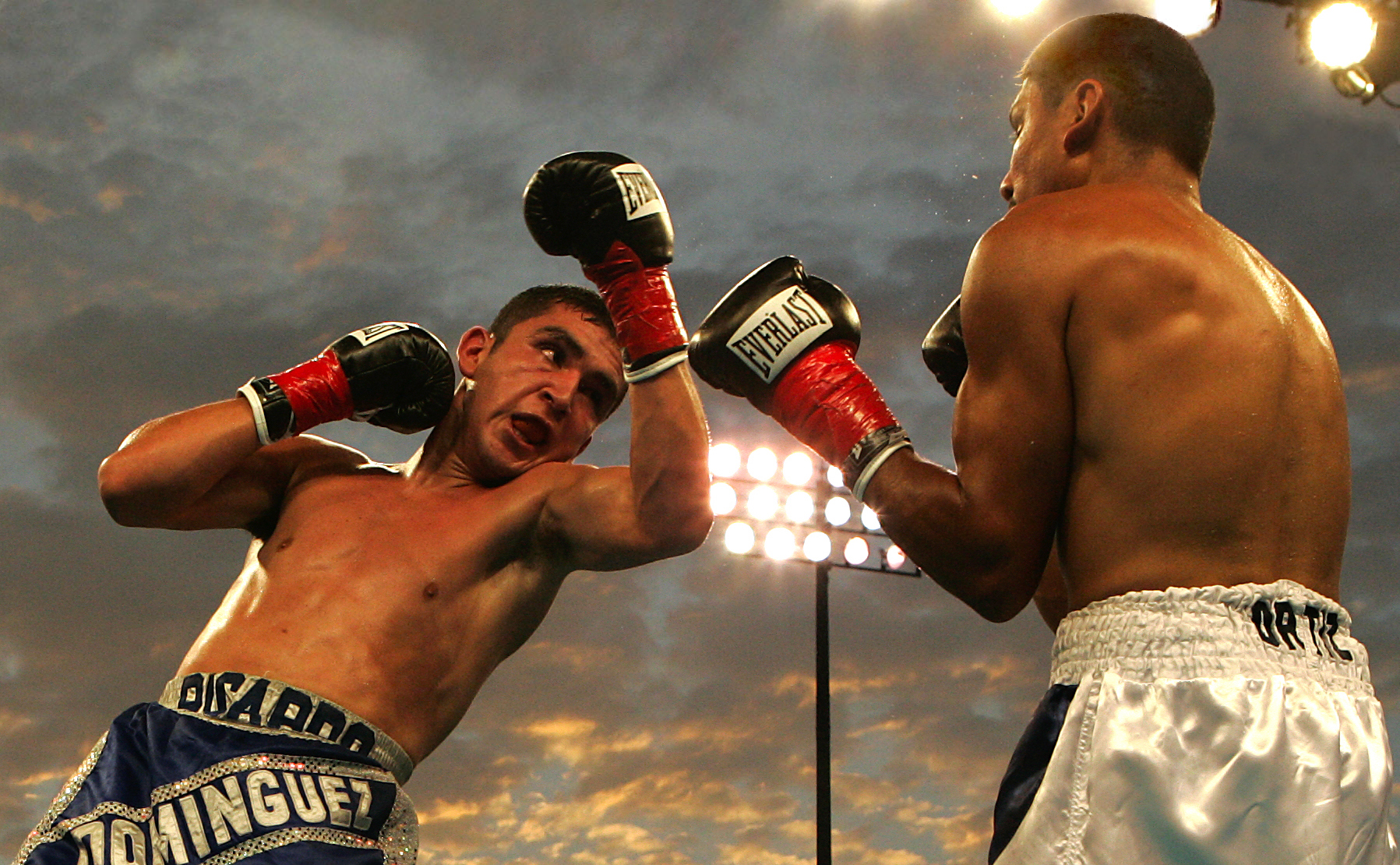
Boxing is a sport where two participants of similar weight attack each other with their fists in a series of one to three-minute intervals called "rounds". Modern boxing began in 1867 with the Marquess of Queensberry rules. Currently, there are two distinct branches of boxing: Professional and Olympic, which have different rules, but are similar in execution.

- Martial arts by form – some examples include:
  - Boxing
  - Fencing
  - Karate
  - Kickboxing
  - Kung fu
  - Judo
  - Jujutsu
  - Mixed martial arts
  - Stick-fighting
  - Wushu
  - Wrestling
- Martial arts by region
  - Chinese martial arts
  - European martial arts
  - Filipino martial arts
  - Indian martial arts
  - Irish martial arts
  - Indochinese martial arts
  - Japanese martial arts
    - Okinawan martial arts
  - Korean martial arts
  - Russian martial arts

== History of martial arts ==
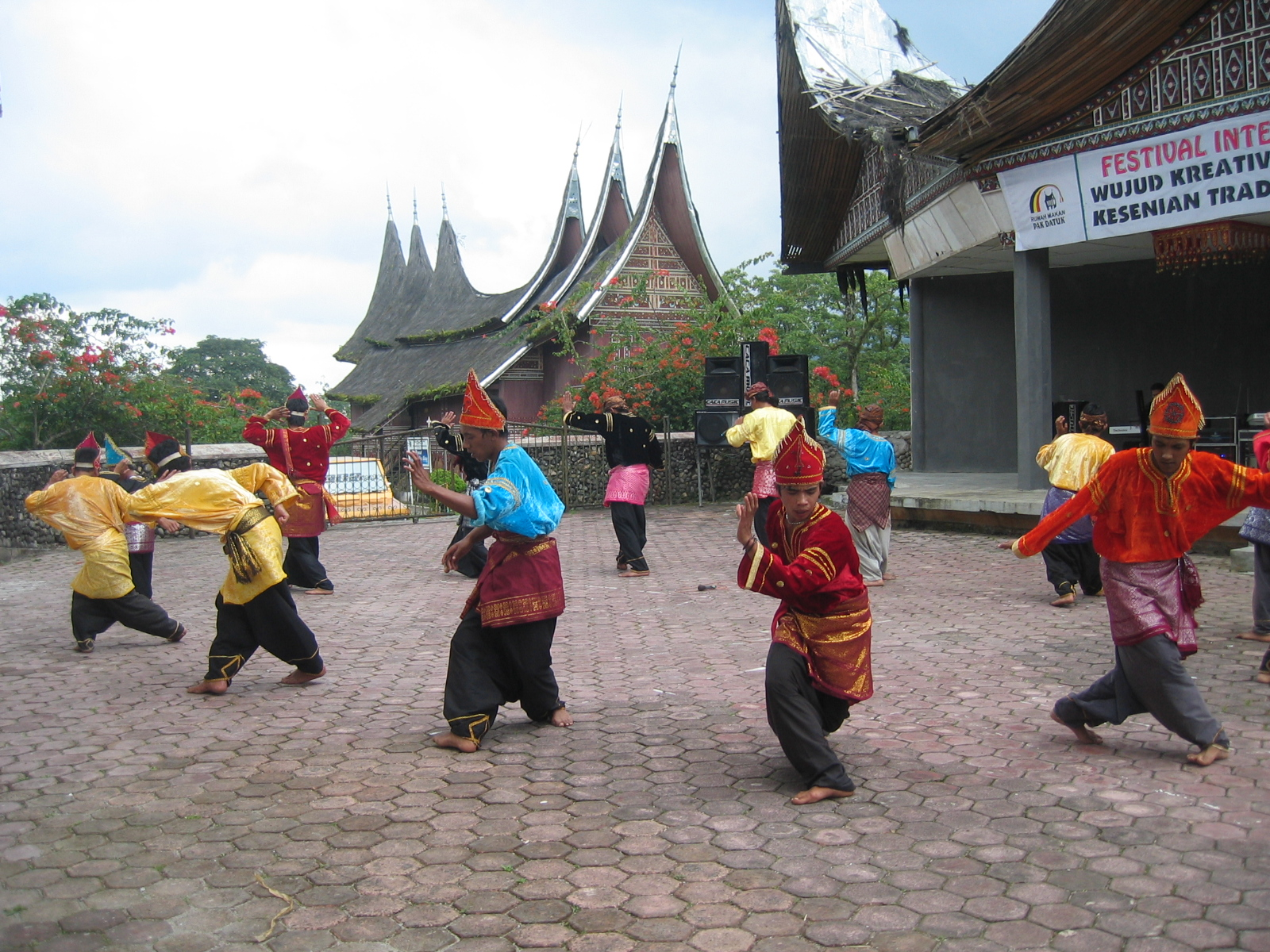
Randai is a folk theater tradition of the Minangkabau ethnic group which incorporates music, singing, dance, drama and the silat martial art. Randai is usually performed for traditional ceremonies and festivals, and complex stories may span a number of nights.

History of martial arts

- Origin of Asian martial arts

== Techniques ==
- Grappling techniques
  - Throws
  - Grappling holds
  - Joint locks
    - Chin na
- Striking techniques
  - Kicks
  - Punches
    - Jab
    - Uppercut
    - Cross
    - Bolo punch
  - Knee (strike)
  - Elbow (strike)
- Blocking techniques
  - Parry
- Stances

== Martial arts equipment ==
- Boxing gloves
- Boxing rings
- Focus mitts
- Hand wraps
- Headgears
- Hogu
- Iron rings
- MMA gloves
- Punching bags
- Martial arts weapons
  - Clubs
  - Bows
  - Knives
  - Practice weapons
  - Shields
  - Guns
  - Sickles
  - Staff or stick weapons
  - Spear weapons
  - Swords
  - Batons
- Wrestling ring

== Training techniques and equipment ==
- Chi sao
- Dojo
- Fechtschule
- Floryshe
- Jian
- kata
- Kihon
- Kumite
- Kurtka
- Sparring
- Pushing hands
- Qigong
- Wooden dummy

== Kinds of violent situation ==
- self-defense
- street fighting

== Organizations ==
- ABADÁ-Capoeira
- Aikikai
- All Japan Kendo Federation
- British Judo Association
- Pride Fighting Championships
- Japan Aikido Association
- The International Taoist Tai Chi Society
- The Jitsu Foundation
- Ultimate Fighting Championship
- United Fighting Arts Federation
- Bujinkan
- Genbukan

== Famous Martial Artists ==
The following list consists of various famous martial artists of all different types and throughout history.

- Bruce Lee, Most noted for career as an actor, however Lee was also a martial arts instructor, philosopher, film director, film producer, screenwriter, and founder of the Jeet Kune Do (JKD) martial arts movement.
- Jackie Chan, Most noted for his career as a martial arts actor. Chan is also an action choreographer, filmmaker, comedian, director, producer, screenwriter, entrepreneur, singer and stunt performer.
- Chuck Norris
- Steven Seagal, 7th-dan black belt in Aikido. Segal became the first foreigner to operate an Aikido Dojo in Japan.
- Miyamoto Musashi
- Ip Man, Famous Wing Chun practitioner who taught many other famous martial artists.
- Gichin Funakoshi, Creator of Shotokan karate.
- Kanō Jigorō, Founder of judo.
- Masaaki Hatsumi
- Tony Jaa, Famous actor, choreographer, stuntman, director, and former monk. Member of Muay Thai Stunt.
- Panna Rittikrai
- Dan Chupong
- Robin Shou, Famous martial arts actor who is most noted for his role as Liu Kang in Mortal Kombat.
- Sammo Hung
- Huo Yuanjia, Famous practitioner of Mizongyi and co-founder of the Chin Woo Athletic Association. Yuanjia is a national hero in China for defeating foreign fighters in highly publicized matches.
- Phillip Rhee, Famous practitioner of various martial arts (taekwondo, hapkido, kendo, wing chun, and boxing) and a successful actor.
- Jean-Claude Van Damme, Famous practitioner of various martial arts (shotokan karate, kickboxing, muay thai, and taekwondo) and a successful actor.
- Sho Kosugi, Practitioner of various martial arts and a successful actor, particularly in ninja films.
- Sonny Chiba, Practitioner of various martial arts, noted as one of the first actors to achieve stardom through his skills in martial arts.
- Zhang Ziyi
- Morihei Ueshiba, Founder of aikido.
- Mas Oyama, Founder of kyokushinkai karate.
- Yuen Biao
- Angela Mao
- Kathy Long
- Mark Dacascos
- Wesley Snipes
- Iko Uwais
- Dan Inosanto, Famous martial arts instructor who teaches, jeet kune do (JKD), filipino martial arts, shoot wrestling, brazilian jiu-jitsu (BJJ), muay thai, silat, mixed martial arts (MMA), and American kenpo karate.
- Wu Jing
- Carlos Gracie, Co-founder of brazilian jiu-jitsu (BJJ).
- Hélio Gracie, Co-founder of brazilian jiu-jitsu (BJJ). Gracie was also a 6th degree black belt jūdōka.
- Vidyut Jamwal, Action star popularly known as "The New Age Action Hero of Bollywood" is a trained martial artist since the age of three in the art form called Kalaripayattu.
- Conor McGregor A mixed martial artist who is famous for competing in the UFC and holding two championship belts simultaneously.
- Muhammad Ali

== See also ==
- Outline of sports
- Duel
  - Code duello
- Shaolin Monastery and Shaolin kung fu
- Qigong
- Martial arts film
- Wu Xia film
- Kung Fu (TV series)
- Qi
- Reaction time
- Wudangshan
- Yin Yang
- Ninja
- Samurai (bushi)
- hara
- Dantian
- Kiai
- Kimono
- Hakama
- Black belt (martial arts)
- Provost (martial arts)
- dan
- I.33
- Fechtbuch
- Shintaido
- Sensei
- Tricking (martial arts)
- Hand training
- Kathakali
- Seiza
- Parkour
