= Stylebender (film) =

2023 New Zealand documentary film

- Theatrical release poster
- Directed by: Zoe McIntosh
- Written by: Zoe McIntosh; Tom Blackwell; Brendan Donovan
- Produced by: Tom Blackwell; Fraser Brown; Leela Menon
- Starring: Israel Adesanya
- Cinematography: Jacob Bryant; Ian McCarroll; Gareth Moon; Jeff Sainlar; Tammy Williams
- Edited by: Peter Roberts
- Production company: FluroBlack
- Distributed by: Ahi Films
- Release dates: 11 June 2023 (Tribeca Film Festival); 28 September 2023 (New Zealand)
- Running time: 102 minutes
- Country: New Zealand
- Language: English

Stylebender is a 2023 New Zealand documentary film, focusing on the life of Nigerian and New Zealand professional mixed martial artist Israel Adesanya.

== Synopsis ==
The film follows Adesanya's early life, upbringing, and his decision to pursue mixed martial arts professionally.

== Production ==
The film is the sixth major release by director Zoe McIntosh, who began working on the film in 2019. The film was shot over a five-year period. Adesanya was inspired to create the film documenting his life, to combat ideas of toxic masculinity.

== Release ==
The film debuted at the Tribeca Festival on 11 June 2023, which Adesanya attended in person. Stylebender was nominated for Best Documentary at the festival. The film was later screened at the Zurich Film Festival in September 2023. The film received a wide release in New Zealand cinemas on 28 September.

The movie was released on Apple TV in 2024 and was released worldwide on 24 September 2024.

== See also ==
- Born Warriors
- FightWorld
- La Fosse aux Tigres
