= Born to Fight =

Born to Fight may refer to:

- Born to Fight (1936 film), an American boxing film starring Frankie Darro
- Born to Fight (1984 film), a Thai action film
- Born to Fight (1989 film), an action film
- Born to Fight (2004 film), a Thai action film
- Knockout (2011 film), released with the title Born to Fight
- Born to Fight (album), a 2018 album by Karise Eden
