= Muay Thai Stunt =

Thai film stunts group

Muay Thai Stunt is a Thailand-based group of stunt doubles, formed by Panna Rittikrai to work alongside him on action films. Members of the stunt team are skilled in acrobatics and gymnastics, parkour, weapons-related fighting arts, Muay Thai and other martial arts including Wushu and Tae Kwon Do. The stunt team specializes in fight choreography, fall stunts, wire-work, vehicular stunts and explosion stunts. A trademark of Panna's films is the use of full contact rather than pulling punches or the use of camera tricks in the fight scenes.

== History ==
=== Early films ===
The stunt team was formed in Khon Kaen Province in 1979 as "P.P.N. Stunt Team", composed of 20 people at its initial conception. In 1984, Panna and his crew worked on Gerd Ma Lui (Born to Fight) with Panna as director, fight choreographer, and stunt coordinator as well as lead actor. Several of his stuntmen co-starred in it. Between the mid-1980s to the late 1990s, over 50 low-budget indie action films were produced.

By the mid-1990s, the action genre in Thailand was in decline, causing several of the members to disband from the stunt team. Due to lack of interest, Panna was forced to discontinue producing action films momentarily, marking an end of the B-movie actioner era.

=== A new beginning ===
In 1999, Panna formed a partnership with Prachya Pinkaew and Prachya's production house, Baa-Ram-Ewe, to collaborate on a big-budget studio film, Ong-Bak, through Sahamongkol Film International. Prachya was to direct while Panna served as martial arts choreographer and stunt coordinator. Sharing the same passion for action films, they both intended to revive this genre in Thailand through Ong Bak with raw and daring physical stunts as shown in Panna's earlier films. Before production, Panna assembled a new stunt team again and he handpicked one of his protégés, Tony Jaa, to take the lead role. After four years of production, Ong-Bak was released and it became an international box-office success.

The success led to more Thai action film projects with further collaboration between Baa-Ram-Ewe and Panna's stunt team. The action comedy The Bodyguard and a new version of Panna's first action movie Gerd ma lui titled Born to Fight were released in 2014. Dan Chupong who started as a stuntman like Tony Jaa, was promoted to lead actor for Born to Fight. In Born to Fight, Panna put more emphasis on the stunts and less on fight choreography.

Other notable films with Panna and his stunt team include Ong Bak 2, Mercury Man and Chocolate.

== Members ==
- Panna Rittikrai
- Tony Jaa
- Banlu Srisaeng
- Dan Chupong AKA Chupong Changprung
- Veerapol Poomartfun
- Thavorn Tonapun
- Kawee Sirikhanaerat
- Somjai Junmoontree
- Banphot Kimuenwai
- Patchawat Sooksil
- Kritsanapong Ratchata
- Morakot Kaewthanee
- Pondget Meegoola
- Ridet Ladpunna
- Chatree Hindtai
- Somchat Hindta
- Udomrat Ladpunna
