= Lethwei in popular culture =

Burmese martial art

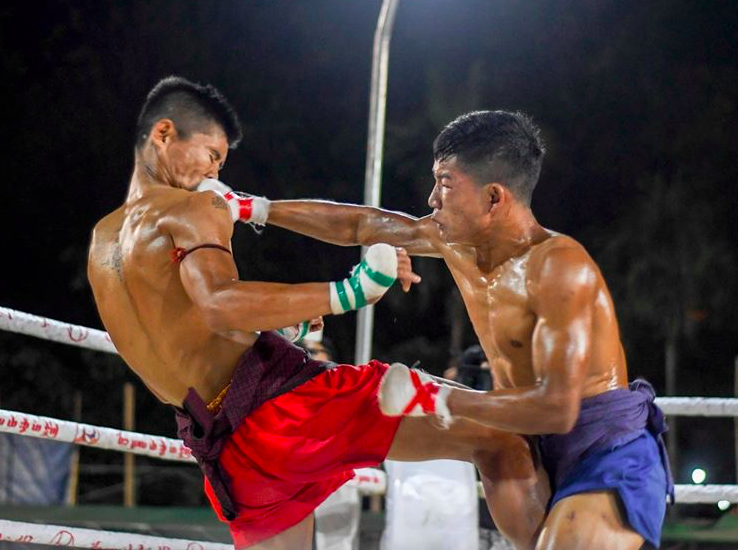
Lethwei fighter landing a punch

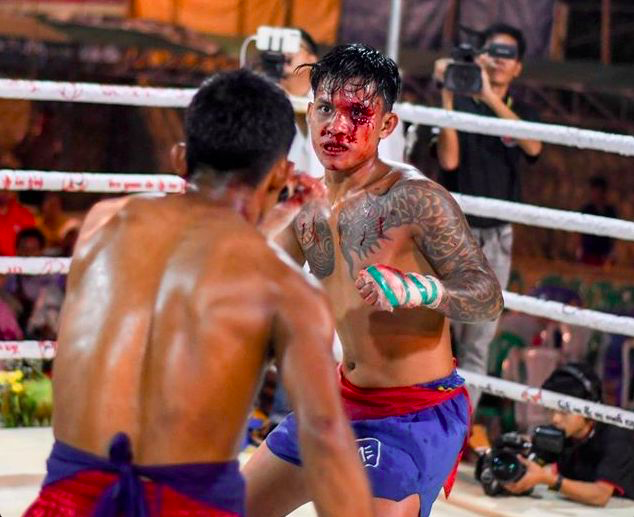
Bloody Lethwei match

The Burmese martial art of Lethwei has been featured in films, television, manga and anime. Born Warriors presented an authentic up-close look at Lethwei through a series of documentaries shot entirely on location throughout Myanmar. Active research and filming for Vincent Giordano's documentary began in 1999, and the first installment premiered at the Myanmar Film Festival in 2014. Lethwei was featured in The Joe Rogan Experience podcast by Joe Rogan with Lethwei champion Dave Leduc as guest. Lethwei was featured in the Netflix documentary FightWorld with Soe Lin Oo hosted by Frank Grillo and in the popular Japanese manga series Kengan Ashura.

== Film ==
Movie	Year	Description
Born Warriors	2016	Trilogy documentary film about the art of Lethwei.
La Fosse aux Tigres	2017	Canal D documentary about the Dave Leduc vs. Tun Tun Min III fight in 2016.
Into Dave's Fist	2018	Canal+ Myanmar documentary following Dave Leduc on his preparation for his trilogy fight against Tun Tun Min
Still/Life	2019	A short Film about Lethwei in Myanmar
Myanmar Lethwei and Me	2019	Canal+ Myanmar documentary following Dave Leduc around Myanmar exploring the Lethwei culture.
Power & Martial Arts : Lethwei	2019	Short film about Lethwei following Dave Leduc around Yangon, Myanmar. Power & Martial Arts at IMDb
Underground	2019	Myanmar movie in Burmese language with Dave Leduc playing a gangster and using Lethwei in fight scenes.

== Television ==
Television	Year	Episode	Description
FightWorld	2018	Myanmar: Crossroads	American docu-series on Netflix with Episode 3 about Lethwei.
Spirit of Fight	2019	Season 1 & 2	Canal+ Myanmar TV Series about Lethwei fighters on Canal+ Zat Lenn channel.
Le Canal Nouvelles	2019	LCN: Denis Lévesque	Denis Lévesque and Dave Leduc discuss Lethwei.
The Amazing Race Canada	2019	Season 7 - Episode 1	Dave Leduc explains Lethwei during team introductions.
The Joe Rogan Experience	2019	MMA Show Episode #81	Joe Rogan and Dave Leduc discuss Lethwei.
World Lethwei Championship	2019	WLC 7: Mighty Warriors	The first Lethwei event to be transmitted live on UFC Fight Pass.
Billions	2022	Cannonade	Season 6 Ep. 1 – Kate Sacker played by Condola Rashad trains for a Lethwei fight.

== Anime and manga ==
Lethwei has been featured in the popular Japanese manga series Kengan Ashura. In the series, opponents of the Burmese Lethwei master Saw Paing shatter the bones in their hands when they punch him.

Manga or Animation	Characters
Baki the Grappler	Pa Paing from Kengan Ashura fights Doppo Orochi using Lethwei in "Baki x Kengan", Baki-Dou (2018), Chapter 107.5
Kengan Ashura	Saw Paing (Burmese fighter)
Batuque	Batuque Vol. 8 Chapter 79: "Lethwei vs Capoeira"

== See also ==
- Capoeira in popular culture
- Muay Thai in popular culture
