= Capoeira in popular culture =

Brazilian martial art

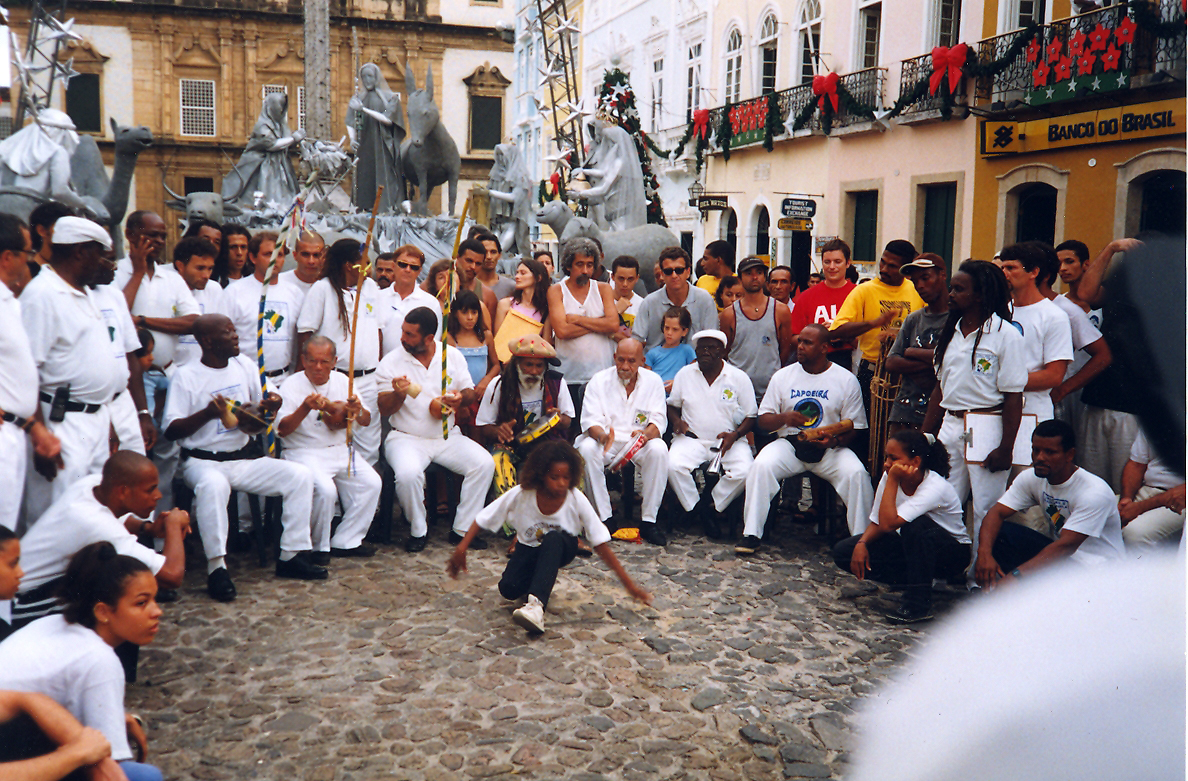
Roda de Capoeira, Salvador, Bahia, Brasil.

The Brazilian martial art of capoeira, noted for its acrobatic movements and kicks, has often been featured in and influenced popular culture.

== Films ==
Capoeira and capoeira mestres have been featured in several Brazilian films and documentaries including:

- O Pagador de Promessas (1962), a religious drama and Palm d'Or winner.
- Danca da guerra (1972), a short capoeira movie by Jair Moura.
- Cordão de Ouro (1977), a futuristic Brazilian movie, stars several well-known Mestres, such as Nestor Capoeira and Mestre Camisa.
- Capoeira of Brazil (1980) is a documentary short by Warrington Hudlin, featuring Mestres Jelon Vieira, Loremil Machado and Eusebio da Silva.
- Mestre Bimba: A Capoeira Illuminada (2006), a documentary about Mestre Bimba and capoeira.
- Besouro (2009) is based on the story of a capoeira fighter, starring Aílton Carmo as Besouro. It includes extensive capoeira fighting scenes.
- Jogo de Corpo. Capoeira e Ancestralidade (2013), documentary on the Angolan origins of capoeira, following mestre Cobra Mansa to Africa.

Capoeira has been a focus of several martial arts films, including:

- Rooftops (1989), a film featuring two homeless teenagers who use dance fights inspired by capoeira to settle arguments and as a form of entertainment.
- Only the Strong (1993), a film following a former Green Beret turned teacher in Miami who uses capoeira to teach his students discipline and ultimately faces off with the local gang. It is considered the only Hollywood film to focus entirely on capoeira. Much of the film's fight choreography was created by Mestre Amen Santo.
- Kickboxer 4: The Aggressor (1994) which featured a tournament with fighters of many styles, including a capoeirista played by Mestre Amen Santo.
- The Quest (1996), a martial arts tournament film featured a capoeirista played by Mestre Cesar Carneiro.
- Tom-Yum-Goong (2005), with Lateef Crowder as a capoeirista

Other films featuring capoeira include:

- Many of Wesley Snipes' action films include scenes involving capoeira, as it is one of several martial arts he practices.
- In the Marvel Cinematic Universe, capoeira is one of several African martial arts that T'Challa utilizes in combat.

== Video games ==
Fighting games that feature capoeira fighters or fighting styles include:

- The Tekken series features capoeiristas Eddy Gordo and Christie Monteiro. Both characters have been well received, and have been credited with popularizing capoeira to a wider audience.
- The Street Fighter III series feature the capoeirista Elena. Elena, an African woman, was envisioned to have long arms and legs, and capoeira was chosen as a suitable fighting style for her.
- Hitmontop, a Pokémon species introduced in the 1999 games Pokémon Gold and Silver, is a Fighting-type Pokémon whose style is based on capoeira.
- The Fatal Fury series features two capoeira fighters, Richard Meyer and Bob Wilson.
- Zone 4, an online martial arts game, includes capoeira as a playable fighter's type.

Other games featuring capoera include:

- Martial Arts: Capoeira, is a 2011 RPG action game focused on capoera.
- In the mobile game Crossy Road, a playable capoeira fighter was added in a Brazil-themed update. The character navigates through the streets of Rio de Janeiro with acrobatic flips.
- In Overwatch, Lucio, a music star from Brazil, has a skin where he performs a dance move based on capoeira.

== Music ==
- The music video for "The Obvious Child" by Paul Simon features capoeira. This was the first single from Simon's album The Rhythm of the Saints, released in 1990.
- The 2006 music video for "Mas Que Nada" by the Black Eyed Peas and Sérgio Mendes features several scenes of capoeiristas along with various Brazilian dance forms, and Professor Marcinho playing.
- The music video of the song "Roots Bloody Roots" by Brazilian metal band Sepultura features several shots of capoeira.

== Anime and manga ==
Anime and manga series that feature capoeira include:

- In the 2018 manga series Batuque, the main character Ichiri Sanjou starts learning capoeira from a Brazilian man, and she quickly becomes good at it, enjoying both the fighting and the idea of freedom it represents.
- In the 2021 anime series Odd Taxi, Miho Shirakawa displays her limited knowledge of capoeira, to the dismay of protagonist Hiroshi Odokawa. Later, Shirakawa uses the martial art to rescue Odokawa from an attacker.
- In the 2019 manga series The 100 Girlfriends Who Really, Really, Really, Really, Really Love You, one of the girlfriends, Eira Kaho, is a capoerista. She is of Brazilian descent, and learned the martial art from her father.

== Other influences ==
Breakdancing, developed in the 1970s, has many analogous moves. However, the original breakdancers of the early 1970s based their style primarily on actors in Asian kung fu films, but received some influence because demonstrations of capoeira master Jelon Vieira in New York.

Kofi Kingston, a WWE professional wrestler, has incorporated wrestling moves inspired by Tekken capoeira fighter Eddy Gordo.

The Bob's Burgers episode "Sexy Dance Fighting" (season 1, episode 4) prominently features Capoeira. It was first broadcast on television in the United States on the Fox network on February 13, 2011.

== See also ==
- Lethwei in popular culture
- Muay Thai in popular culture
