= Lim Su-jeong =

Lim Su-jeong or Im Soo-jung (Korean: 임수정) may refer to:

- Im Soo-jung (born 1979), South Korean actress
- Lim Su-jeong (taekwondo) (born 1986), South Korean taekwondo practitioner
- Lim Su-jeong (kickboxer) (born 1985), South Korean Muay Thai kickboxer
