= Lumphini =

Lumphini is the transliterated Thai name of Lumbini, the birthplace of the Buddha in Nepal. It may refer to:

- Lumphini Park, a public park in Bangkok
  - Lumphini Subdistrict in Pathum Wan District, Bangkok, covering the area around the park
  - Lumphini MRT station

== See also ==
- Lumpinee Boxing Stadium
- Lumpini (film), a documentary film about professional Muay Thai boxing; see Muay Thai in popular culture
- Lumbini (disambiguation)
