= Thavisin =

Thavisin (Thai: ทวีสิน or ทวีศิลป์, RTGS: Thawisin, with various other romanized spellings) is a surname and masculine given name of Thai origin. Notable people with the name include:

== Surname ==
- Pakpilai Thavisin (born 1960), Thai physician and businesswoman, wife of Srettha
- Srettha Thavisin (born 1962), Thai politician and real estate developer, 30th Prime Minister of Thailand

== Given name ==
- Taweesin Visanuyothin (born 1965), Thai psychiatrist who served as government spokesman during the COVID-19 pandemic
