= Raging Phoenix =

2009 film

- Directed by: Rashane Limtrakul
- Written by: Sompope Vejchapipat
- Starring: Yanin Vismistananda; Kazu Patrick Tang
- Release date: August 12, 2009
- Country: Thailand
- Language: Thai

Raging Phoenix (Thai: จีจ้า ดื้อ สวย ดุ; translit: Jeeja Due Suai Du) is a 2009 Thai martial arts film starring Yanin "Jeeja" Vismistananda, in her second film performance. It is directed by Rashane Limtrakul, with martial arts choreography by Panna Rittikrai.

== Plot ==
Deu (Jija Yanin) meets three masters of drunken martial arts—"Dog Shit", "Pig Shit", and Sanim, when they foil an attempt to abduct her. She convinces them to train her in their martial arts style, and learns that they have come together to defeat the Jaguar Gang, who abduct "special" young women. She falls for Sanim while he trains her—but learns that he is still in love with Pai—his fiancée who was abducted by the Jaguar Gang three years ago, during what was supposed to be their wedding.

After rescuing more women using her newfound skills, Deu is twice tested by the until now hidden fourth member of the team—"Bull Shit". She learns that The Jaguar gang only abducts women with a certain "smell", a smell that Deu has, which they use to make a special perfume—and that the secret of her new kung fu is not simply drunkenness, but emotional pain. However, Kee Ma (Dog Shit) is a "Sniffer", and is able to find the smell. To locate out the Jaguar Gang's hideout, Deu is used as a decoy. It works too well, as Deu is abducted but the team fails to find the hideout where she was taken.

Deu, having been drugged, tries to escape and finds out the reason why the Jaguar gang abducts these specific women. The women's tears have a chemical substance which is able to improve health. Deu is then caught, but not before knocking some vials of the tears onto the floor which causes them to break. Kee Ma is able to smell the tears and shows the others into the hideout where they have a large battle ensues.

Sanim tries to take Deu away from the fighting but instead finds Pai. Before they are able to take Pai away, they meet the leader of the Jaguar Gang, London (Roongtawan Jindasing). They attempt to escape from London with the drugged and limp Pai, but London corners them near a sequence of rope bridges, and the real fight begins. Finally, London is temporarily defeated, and Sanim and Pai are left dangling over the edge of a bridge with Deu holding onto both of them. Sanim then sacrifices himself for Pai and lets go of Deu's hand. London recovers and takes both Deu and Pai to where the rest of the team is being beaten by two Jaguar Members. As they are knocked out, Deu rouses herself using the pain of Sanim's passing, and fights with London and the other two members in turn, defeating each of them.

== Cast ==
- Yanin "Jeeja" Vismistananda as Deu
- Kazu Patrick Tang as Sanim
- Nui Saendaeng as Kee Moo (Pig Shit)
- Sompong Lertwimonkaisom as Kee Ma (Dog Shit)
- Boonprasayrit Salangam as Kee Kwai (Bull Shit)
- Jindasee Roongtawan as London

== Martial art ==
According to the trailer, the main fighting style that was created for the film (the fictional martial art เมรัยยุทธ (Meyraiyuth)) is a "dance that kills". It is described as taking techniques used "from B-Boy's battles" and transforming them into "Martial Arts Killing moves".

The trailer also favorably compares it to "Chinese Drunken Fist" (Chinese: 醉拳; pinyin: zuì quán) as a form of "Drunken Muay Thai".

Besides drawing inspiration from Breakdancing, Drunken boxing & Muay Thai, the physical aspects of the fight choreography appear to be based heavily on the Afro-Brazilian martial art Capoeira

== Reception ==
The movie received mostly positive praise.
