= Wasan Khantaau =

Thai actor and model (born 1984)

- วสันต์ กันทะอู
- Born: 9 July 1984 (age 42); Lampang, Thailand
- Other name: Bombay (บอมเบย์)
- Education: Chandrakasem Rajabhat University
- Occupations: Actor; model
- Notable work: Mercury Man (2006)
- Height: 178 cm (5 ft 10 in)

Wasan Khantaau (Thai: วสันต์ กันทะอู; born 9 July 1984), nicknamed Bombay (Thai: บอมเบย์) is a former Thai actor. He is best known for portraying the titular superhero in Mercury Man (2006).

== Early life and education ==
Wasan Khantaau was born in Lampang province. He graduated from Chandrakasem Rajabhat University, majoring in Radio-Television Program in the Faculty of Communication Arts.

== Career ==
Bombay started his career as a model, appearing in advertisements for MK Suki restaurant chain, Hutch, Pond's, Turbo Bicycle, Ciforo car, and FF Noodle. He also walked the runway for fashion shows of Armani, L'Oreal, and Bangkok Fashion City. He has been featured in Thailand's Volume magazine as well.

In his 4th year of university, he made his film debut as the lead actor in Mercury Man (2006), (Note: Credited as Vasan Kantha-oo) for which he trained in Muay Thai and other forms of fighting.

While the movie was a flop and panned by critics, his performance has received mixed reviews. IGN's Jenna Busch wrote, "Khantaau is probably the best of the lot, which is surprising considering this is his first film." John Li from moviexclusive.com wrote, "Playing Mercury Man is a decent and endearing Vasan Kantha-u, who looks determined to save the world with the correct dose of angst and resolution." On the other hand, molodezhnaja.ch called him "ashen-faced", and brns.com stated that he had "the acting chops of a piece of firewood and the charisma of used chalk".

Khantaau was set to star in the thriller Burn (2008), but was replaced with Chalad Na Songkhla— rumoured to be due to the film's leading actress Bongkoj Khongmalai, which she denied. The film's director Peter Manus stated that the lead actor was changed because filming schedules didn't match up, as Khantaau had to focus on his studies; while the actor said that he wasn't directly informed about the decision to replace him.
