= Chattapong Pantana-Angkul =

Thai actor and martial artist

Chattaphong Pantana-Angkul (Thai: ฉัฏฐพงศ์ พันธนะอังกูร, RTGS: Chatthaphong Phanthana-angkun; or Chatthapong Pantanaunkul, also known as Lewis Phantana, born April 8, 1971) is a Thai actor and martial artist. His films include Ong-Bak and Born to Fight.

== Filmography ==
- 999-9999 (2002)
- Ong-Bak (2003)
- Club zaa: Pit tamraa saep (คลับซ่า ปิดตำราแสบ) (2004)
- Lizard Woman (Tuk kae phii) (2004)
- Be Very Quiet (2004) ... Pimp
- Born to Fight (2004)
- Taepung (Typhoon) (2005)
