= Born Warriors =

2016 film by Vincent Giordano

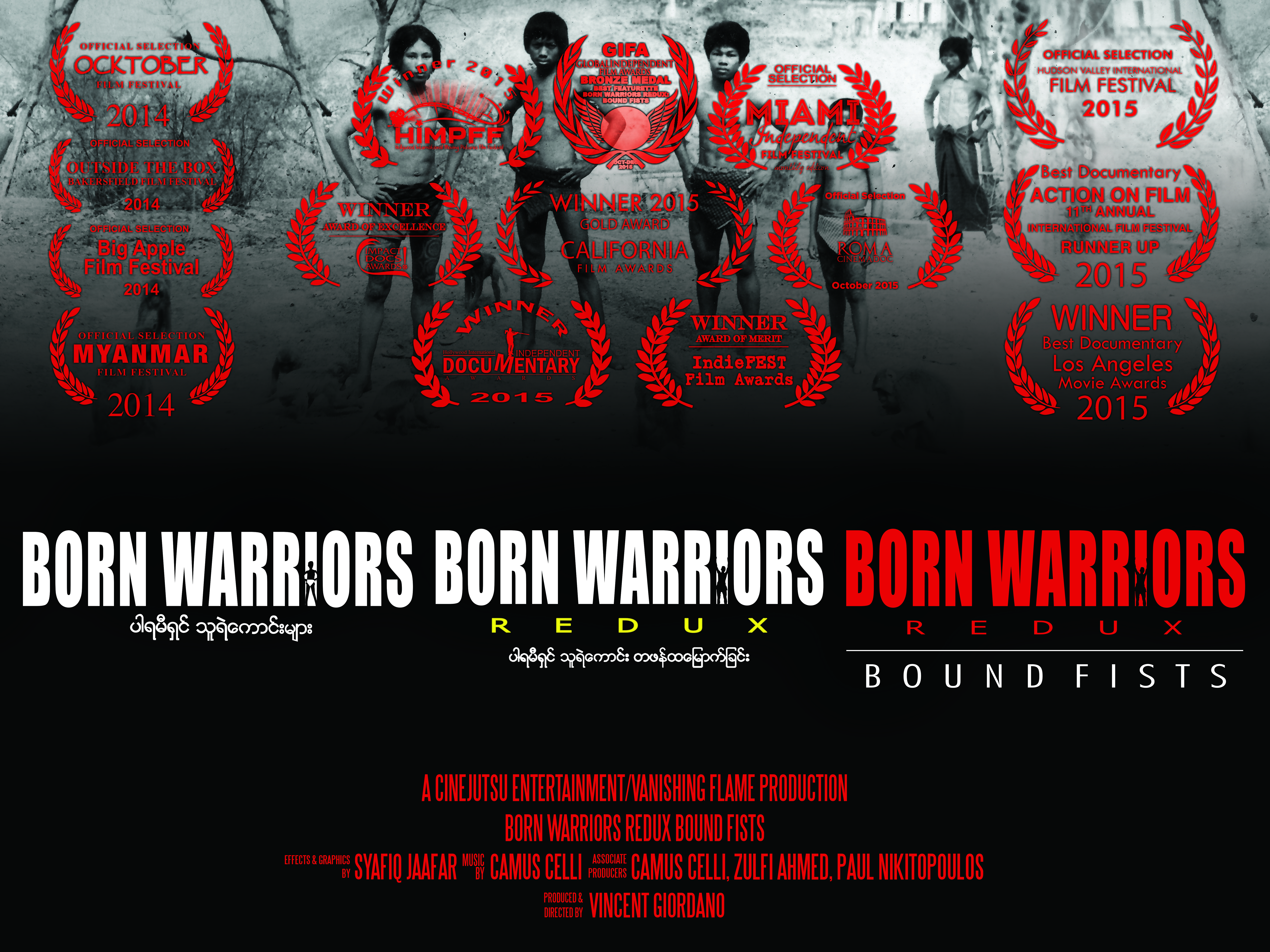
- Born Warriors poster
- Directed by: Vincent Giordano
- Release date: 2014

Born Warriors is a 2016 trilogy of documentary films directed and shot by Vincent Giordano. The films focus on the art of Lethwei, an ancient form of Burmese bare-knuckle/bound-fist fighting that is still practiced throughout Myanmar.

== Overview ==
Burmese Lethwei, or Myanmar Traditional Boxing, is one of the oldest combat sports in Myanmar, and the Burmese are the last of the great bare-knuckle fighters in Southeast Asia. The Thais, Cambodians and Laotians all gave up or outlawed their active bare-knuckle fighting traditions and introduced more modern (and gloved) ring arts such as Muay Thai, Pradal Serey and Muay Lao. Technically, full-bare-knuckle fight rules are not banned in Thailand, and bare-knuckle events have been fought yearly in the televised Songkran/Thingyan Thailand vs. Myanmar shows that have been televised since 1986. These hugely popular competitions go back even farther, probably since the early 1900s. Thailand uses the full ancient Muay rules. including headbutts, throws and two referees in the ring. Some large-scale events, like the M-180 challenge match from 2000, included fighters from Cambodia, Myanmar, Japan and Thailand

The Born Warriors project unfolds in three distinct parts. Each part is a separate film. The first details Lethwei before Burma's era of democratic reform. The second part focuses on how the sport is again evolving as it struggles with growth and fierce competition among promoters who wish to control and dominate it. The third part updates the second documentary, but focuses more on the rural communities and the further evolution of the sport. It is a special updated director's cut of the second documentary.

The original idea was to create distinctive chapters, similar to a book, where the main documentaries are supported by extensive bonus material. The latter material delves deeper into specific topics covered in the main documentaries.

Ultimately, it is the story of Lethwei's survival through the dark periods of Myanmar's tough military rule and the country's gradual transition toward a quasi democracy.

== Synopsis ==
Born Warriors focuses on the ancient fighting sport of Lethwei and the tightly knit group of fighters, trainers and promoters who struggled during a turbulent period in Burma's history to keep the sport alive.

The documentary, shot prior to the opening of the country's borders in 2011, takes advantage of a unique archive of rare photos, manuscripts, footage and training documents assembled from the research that took the director close to two decades to compile.

Born Warriors Redux follows the sport of Lethwei as it faces an unusual series of challenges stemming from the opening of the country to the outside world. Lethwei is an ancient sport that once prepared men for combat and served as a rite of passage into manhood. The recent rise of modern training camps throughout Myanmar have allowed people from all walks of life the ability to freely train and compete. The documentary focuses on the clash of modern promoters who are clamoring to control the sport and its future direction.

Born Warriors Redux: Bound Fists is a special director's cut of the second documentary that focuses more on the rural communities that have been the sport's lifeblood since ancient times. The film shows how the people in these communities have kept the sport as it was while modern promoters try their best to the sell the sport as a commodity within Myanmar and to the outside world.

== Production ==
Filming began in 1999 on the northern border between Thailand and Myanmar. The original footage was not intended for a documentary, but as visual support documentation for the Vanishing Flame, a cross-cultural book on the bare-knuckle fighting arts of Southeast Asia and India.

During a trip to Mandalay in 2003, Vincent suffered whiplash when his car nearly flipped as he attempted to flee a military crackdown. His camera was severely damaged and critical footage was lost.

A network of Burmese informers and spies continued to monitor the filming progress, but did not obstruct any of the shoots. Instead, many of the Burmese who participated or helped were endlessly harassed. The situation escalated in 2005, when Vincent and Associate Producer and Music Composer Camus Celli visited the compound of the late author and political activist Min Theinkha to film his Lethwei club in Hmawbi township.

An eventual book deal eventually fell through, but Giordano continued to train, document and film for over two decades. He traveled through most of Burma, Cambodia, Thailand, Laos and India during this period.

A series of screenings of rough-cut material was set up in New York and Connecticut. The screenings failed to generate any interest or further financial support, and the project was scrapped. However, the opening of Myanmar in 2011-2012 sparked renewed interest among hungry Lethwei promoters inside the country. In July 2012, Giordano released a limited-edition DVD entitled Born to Battle: Burma vs. Thailand via his Vanishing Flame underground newsletter. This helped generate funds that enabled him to take a new investigative look at what was happening within the sport. Associate Producer Paul Nikitopoulos, who was living in Yangon at the time, provided the impetus for a totally new video shoot that spread over three years and was completed on a shoestring budget. The final Born Warriors documentaries are a direct result of those intensive filming and training trips.

During the long production and development process, Vincent Giordano taught and hosted seminars and clinics from 1990 through early 2020 with some of the top Southeast Asia and India martial artists through his NYCA school in New York City. This introduced many of the concepts and teachings highlighted in the documentaries. The seminars and clinics that focused on Lethwei helped expand the awareness of the true sport in the West for the first time. Vincent continues to research, train and teach through his yearly trips to Thailand, Cambodia, Laos and Myanmar. His forthcoming book Lethwei: Sport of Warriors will be available in 2017 followed by a new documentary.

== Reception ==
At the invitation of film producer and martial artist, Warrington Hudlin, the original test edit of Born Warriors entitled Bare Knuckle Warriors was screened at the Museum of the Moving Image in March, 2011. The successful screening was mentioned in a Black Belt magazine article covering the Fist and Sword shows.

The Born Warriors edit was further refined, and a second show was assembled by Burmese Bando Master Mary Mester and held at the Real Art Ways theater in Hartford, Connecticut in October 2011. The show focused on Burmese martial tradition and introduced the new Footprints in the River documentary. This new piece was an overview of Burmese martial arts including Lethwei, Thaing, Bando, Banshay, Naban and various spiritual traditions. In an effort to raise funds to complete the Born Warriors project, a third show was held on June 16, 2012 at the Anthology Film Archives in New York City. Editor Robert Reiter of Muay Thaimes magazine offered to publish an article to support the documentary after attending the early screenings, and a piece written by Giordano appeared in the Spring 2012 issue. Black Belt magazine published an article written by Giordano entitled "Traditional Burmese Lethwei Lives On!" in the October/November 2016 issue following a tradition of Burmese martial arts coverage that began in the early 1970s.

== Awards ==
Born Warriors premiered at the 2014 Myanmar Film Festival as an official selection. It won a special merit award and was later named an official selection of the Big Apple Film Festival, October Film Festival and the Outside the Box Film Festival.

Born Warriors Redux won the 2015 Best Documentary award at the Los Angeles Movie Awards, Best Documentary Runner up at the Action On Film International Film Festival, and was an official selection of the Hudson Valley Film Festival.

Born Warriors Redux: Bound Fists won 2015 Best Documentary honors at the Hollywood International Moving Pictures film Festival, Hollywood International Independent Documentary Awards and a Bronze Medal at the Global Independent Film Awards. Bound Fists also went on to win an Award of Merit at the IndieFest Film Awards, a Gold Award at the California Film Awards, and an Award of Excellence at the Impact Docs Film Festival. It was also an official selection of the Roma Cinema Doc Festival, Newark International Film Festival, MartialCon/Action on Film Festival and Miami Independent Film Festival. The documentary additionally won a Platinum Film Award at the 2016 Spotlight Documentary Film Awards.

== Release ==
The full Born Warriors Trilogy was released on DVD and Blu-ray in 2016. A special 4 Disc Deluxe Edition was released in 2017.

== See also ==
- Lethwei in popular culture
