= Bhandit Thongdee =

- บัณฑิต ทองดี
- Born: March 1, 1971 (age 55)
- Occupations: Film director; screenwriter; producer

Bhandit Thongdee (Thai: บัณฑิต ทองดี, born March 1, 1971) is a Thai film director, screenwriter and producer. His films include Mercury Man and The Unborn.

== Filmography ==
=== Director ===
- Hoedown Showdown (Monpleng luktung F.M.) (2002)
- Soul Under Bed (Sop Tai Tiang) (2003)
- The Unborn a.k.a.The Mother (Hian) (2003)
- Mercury Man (Ma noot lhek lai) (2006)
- After Sundown (2023)

=== Screenwriter ===
- The Unborn a.k.a. The Mother (Hian) (2003)
