= Lumbini (disambiguation) =

Lumbini is a Buddhist pilgrimage site in Nepal, regarded as the birthplace of the Buddha. The name may also refer to:

- Lumbini Gardens, a public park in Bangalore, India
- Lumbini Natural Park, a Buddhist temple in Berastagi, Indonesia
- Lumbini Park, a public park in Hyderabad, India

== Nepal ==
- Lumbini Sanskritik, a municipality in Nepal
- Lumbini Zone, one of the former administrative zones of Nepal
- Lumbini Province, a province in Nepal
- Lumbini Highway (NH52), a highway in Nepal

== See also ==
- Lumphini (disambiguation)
