= Spirit of Fight =

Burmese television series

- Poster
- Burmese: လောကကြိုးဝိုင်း
- Genre: Sports, Action
- Created by: Canal+ (Myanmar)
- Directed by: Arkar
- Starring: Ye Naung; Khar Ra; Nay Aung; Zin Wine; Htun Naing Oo; Yin Let; May Myat Noe; Thel Nandar Soe; San Htut; Yu Nandar; Aung Khine; May Kabyar
- Country of origin: Myanmar
- Original language: Burmese
- No. of seasons: 2
- No. of episodes: 12

Production
- Production location: Myanmar
- Running time: 40 minutes
- Production company: Arkar Production

Original release
- Network: Canal+ Zat Lenn
- Release: 28 April 2019 – 9 April 2020

Spirit of Fight (Burmese: လောကကြိုးဝိုင်း) is a Burmese action sports television series. It aired on Canal+ Zat Lenn. It focuses on the fighting sport of Lethwei. Its season 1 aired from April 28 to June 2, 2019, on every Sunday at 19:00 for 6 episodes and season 2 aired from March 5 to April 9, 2020, on every Thursday at 20:00 for 6 episodes.

== Cast ==
- Ye Naung as Htun Htet
- Khar Ra as Phoenix
- Htun Naing Oo as Ye Hein
- Yin Let as Hsu Lin
- May Myat Noe as Nora
- Thel Nandar Soe as May Nine
- San Htut as Agga
- Yu Nandar as Naw Phaw Say
- Aung Khine as U Maung
- May Kabyar as Suzan
- Zin Wine
- Nay Aung

== See also ==
- Lethwei in popular culture
