= Adventure Capitalists =

US television program

- Genre: Reality television
- Narrated by: Amanda Philipson
- Country of origin: United States
- No. of seasons: 2
- No. of episodes: 10

Original release
- Network: CNBC
- Release: August 22, 2016 – November 14, 2017

Adventure Capitalists is an American reality television series that premiered on August 22, 2016, on CNBC. Adventure Capitalists shows aspiring entrepreneur-contestants as they make business presentations to a panel of investors, who choose whether or not to invest after trying the mostly wilderness based products.

The first season featured 11-year American football linebacker Dhani Jones, 2-time Olympic freestyle skier and 4-year American football wide receiver Jeremy Bloom, businessman Craig Cooper and other guests as investors.

The second season featured Olympic gold medalist, Dancing with the Stars champion, and serial entrepreneur Shawn Johnson.
