= Outside the Box (festival) =

Outside the Box is a free music and arts festival that occurs annually in July at the Boston Common. The festival was not held in 2017 following the death of Ted Cutler, founder and benefactor but returned in 2018.
