= Chocolate (2008 film) =

- Thai poster
- Directed by: Prachya Pinkaew
- Written by: Chookiat Sakveerakul; Weerayawattana Thai
- Produced by: Prachya Pinkaew; Sukanya Vongsthapat
- Starring: Yanin Vismitananda; Hiroshi Abe; Pongpat Wachirabunjong
- Narrated by: Hiroshi Abe
- Cinematography: Decha Srimantra
- Edited by: Rashane Limtrakul; Pop Surasakuwat
- Music by: Korrakot Sittivash; Rochan Madicar; Nimit Jitranon
- Production company: Baa-ram-ewe
- Distributed by: Sahamongkol Film International
- Release date: February 6, 2008
- Running time: 92 minutes
- Country: Thailand
- Languages: Thai; Japanese; English
- Budget: 150 million baht ($4.8 million)

Chocolate (Thai: ช็อคโกแลต), also known as Zen, Warrior Within, is a 2008 Thai martial arts film starring Yanin "Jeeja" Vismistananda in her debut film performance. It is directed by Prachya Pinkaew, with martial arts choreography by Panna Rittikrai. It also stars Hiroshi Abe and Pongpat Wachirabunjong.

== Plot ==
Zin is the Thai lover of Japanese yakuza boss Masashi. Zin was previously the girlfriend of Thai gangster No. 8, who was jealous of her relationship with rival gangster Masashi. After Zin chooses Masashi, he shoots off his own big toe as a symbolic gesture and forbids Zin from ever seeing him again. Zin asks Masashi to go back to Japan, as they would not be able to be together safely. He begrudgingly leaves.

Soon after, Zin finds herself pregnant and moves into a new place to get away from No. 8. She has a daughter named Zen who is soon found to be autistic. As Zen gets older, Zin one day decides to tell Masashi about his daughter by writing him a letter. No. 8 finds out that Zin is in contact with Masashi and is furious. He visits Zin and cuts off one of her toes to remind her that she is forbidden from seeing Masashi.

Zin is forced to move again to a house shared by a Muay Thai Kickboxing school. Zen becomes infatuated with martial arts from a young age, and learns martial arts by mimicking the moves she sees being performed by the school's students, as well as the martial arts movies that she sees on television, among them Bruce Lee and Tony Jaa films. She also has uncanny reflexes and is able to catch balls thrown at her without even looking. One day when coming home from work, Zin sees a little boy named Moom being picked on in the streets. Feeling sorry for his plight, she takes him in.

Zin then falls ill with cancer and does not have the money to pay for chemotherapy treatments. Zen and Moom attempt to make the money needed to pay for them by having people throw balls at Zen as a street performance act. However, they are not able to earn enough to keep up with the treatments. One day Moom discovers a list of debtors in an old notebook from the days when Zin was a high-interest moneylender under No. 8. In order to get money to pay for her mother's cancer treatment, Zen and Moom decide to collect on the debts. The first attempt to collect the money turns violent, and Zen uses her copied martial arts skills to fight back. This leads to further confrontations with various criminal gangs and, eventually, No. 8.

No. 8 learns that Zen is collecting debts for the sake of Zin's treatment, and Zin finds out what Zen and Moom have been doing for money when her toe is sent to her as a message. She realizes there will be retaliation from No. 8, and sends Moom to mail a letter to Masashi asking for help. Moom is captured by No. 8's gang, but No. 8 has the letter mailed anyway, because he wants to deal with both Zin and Masashi. Masashi receives the letter in Japan and leaves the yakuza for the sake of his family. When Moom does not return, Zin goes to confront No. 8 to save Moom and try to reach a solution, bringing Zen with her. The meeting turns into a fight in which both Zin and No. 8 are wounded and No. 8 takes Zin hostage.

Zen fights through many of No. 8's crew to get her mother back and faces Thomas, a capoeirista boy with Tourette's who proves to be a match for her until she adapts to his erratic fighting style. Zen's father, Masashi, eventually makes it to the battle, but while he and Zin are fighting No. 8's men Zin is mortally wounded by No. 8. Angered by what has happened, Zen continues to battle through No. 8's men until she catches up with No. 8 and throws him off the third story of a building to his death. She returns to her mother only to find her dead. Masashi comforts his long lost daughter and adopts her.

== Cast ==
- Yanin "Jeeja" Vismistananda as Zen
- Hiroshi Abe as Masashi
- Pongpat Wachirabunjong as No.8
- Taphon Phopwandee as Mangmoom "Moom" (Named "Mike" in the English Dub)
- Ammara Siripong as Zin
- Dechawut Chuntakaro as Priscilla
- Hirokazu "Hero" Sano as Ryo
- Sirimongkol Singwangcha as Nak Muaythai
- Su Jeong Lim as Su Jeong Lim
- Kittitat Kowahagul as Thomas
- Soumia Abalhaya
- Taweesin Visanuyothin as Doctor Treat Zen's

== Production ==
The star of Chocolate, Yanin Vismitananda, was discovered by director Prachya Pinkaew in 2003 when the director was working on casting sessions for Panna Rittikrai's directorial effort, Born to Fight. Already experienced in taekwondo, Yanin underwent more training with Panna Rittikrai's stunt team. The script for Chocolate was then developed with Yanin in mind. Yanin and b-boying champion Kittitat Kowahagul also trained in capoeira for their fight sequence.

The film was in production during 2006 and 2007, with promotional efforts including a cast appearance at the Bangkok Film Market during the 2007 Bangkok International Film Festival in July. A three-minute promotional video was released online in early January 2008, showing action scenes from the film as well as outtakes of what appeared to be painful injuries for the star and stuntmen.

== Reception ==
The film received generally positive reviews from critics, with praise directed at its action choreography and stunt work, while its plot drew criticism. On the review aggregator website Rotten Tomatoes, 71% of 38 critics' reviews are positive, with an average rating of 6.1/10. The website's consensus reads: "Chocolate is a bizarre martial arts flick, with a slushy plot, an unusual protagonist, and breathtaking stunts."

In 2025, filmmaker Quentin Tarantino ranked Chocolate seventeenth on his list of his 20 favorite films of the 21st century, praising its fight sequences.

== Sequel ==
With the box office success of Chocolate, Sahamongkol Film International was quick to announce their intention to film its sequel (in 3D).
