= Dhani Jones =

American football player (born 1978)

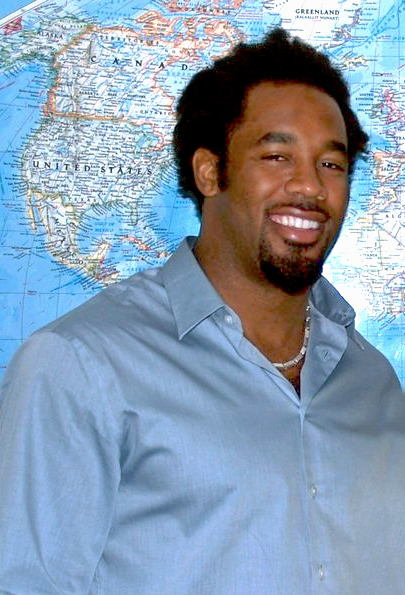
- Jones in 2009

No. 55, 57
- Position: Linebacker

Personal information
- Born: February 22, 1978 (age 48); San Diego, California, U.S.
- Listed height: 6 ft 1 in (1.85 m)
- Listed weight: 240 lb (109 kg)

Career information
- High school: Churchill (Potomac, Maryland)
- College: Michigan (1996–1999)
- NFL draft: 2000: 6th round, 177th overall pick

Career history
- New York Giants (2000–2003); Philadelphia Eagles (2004–2006); New Orleans Saints (2007)*; Cincinnati Bengals (2007–2010)
- * Offseason or practice squad member only

Awards and highlights
- National champion (1997); Second-team All-Big Ten (1999)

Career NFL statistics
- Total tackles: 893
- Sacks: 9.5
- Forced fumbles: 6
- Fumble recoveries: 7
- Interceptions: 5
- Stats at Pro Football Reference

Dhani Makalani Jones (born February 22, 1978) is an American former professional football player who was a linebacker for 11 seasons in the National Football League (NFL). He played college football for the Michigan Wolverines, earning All-Big Ten honors for three straight seasons. He was selected by the New York Giants in the sixth round of the 2000 NFL draft and played for the team for four seasons. Jones also played for the Philadelphia Eagles and Cincinnati Bengals. In addition to his football career, Jones hosted the Travel Channel series Dhani Tackles the Globe and the VH1 show Ton of Cash. Jones also was on the CNBC series Adventure Capitalists.

== Early life ==
Jones was born in San Diego, California. He attended middle school at Cabin John Middle School in Potomac, Maryland, where he played basketball. As a senior at Winston Churchill High School in Potomac, Jones was an All-Met, All-Western Region, and an All-County pick, and also was ranked the fifth best linebacker prospect in the Atlantic Coast Region despite missing most of the regular season with a ruptured disc he injured working out for Penn State earlier in the summer. Jones was also a varsity wrestler in high school, as well as a member of his high school's track team.

== College career ==
At the University of Michigan, Jones was a three time All-Big Ten honoree. As a sophomore, Jones started nine games at linebacker and finished second on the team with 90 tackles and six sacks, playing alongside Heisman Trophy winner Charles Woodson on Michigan's 1997 national champion squad. As a junior in 1998, Jones started at linebacker and finished with 72 tackles. Jones moved to strong side linebacker as a senior in 1999, and finished second on the team with 81 tackles. Jones is a member of Alpha Phi Alpha and is an initiate of the Epsilon chapter at the University of Michigan.

== Professional career ==
Pre-draft measurables
Height	Weight	Arm length	Hand span	40-yard dash	10-yard split	20-yard split	Bench press
6 ft 1 1/8 in (1.86 m)	240 lb (109 kg)	32 1/4 in (0.82 m)	10 in (0.25 m)	4.68 s	1.65 s	2.72 s	29 reps
All values from NFL Combine

=== New York Giants ===
Jones was selected by the New York Giants in the sixth round of the 2000 NFL draft with the 177th overall pick. He played with the team until 2003.

=== Philadelphia Eagles ===
The Philadelphia Eagles acquired Jones from the Giants as a free agent in 2004. During Jones stint with the Eagles, he started in Super Bowl XXXIX. On April 30, 2007, the Eagles released Jones.

=== New Orleans Saints ===
On July 6, 2007, Jones signed with the New Orleans Saints, where he was thought to be able to push for a starting job. Jones, however, was released on September 1, 2007, during final roster cutdowns.

=== Cincinnati Bengals ===
On September 19, 2007, Jones signed a one-year contract with the Bengals. In the 2008 offseason, Jones signed a 3-year contract to return to the Bengals. Following the 2010 season, Jones' contract expired and he was not issued a new contract, so he became a free agent.

Jones retired in October 2011.

== NFL career statistics ==
Legend
**Bold**	Career high

=== Regular season ===
Year	Team	Games		Tackles					Interceptions					Fumbles			
Year	Team	GP	GS	Cmb	Solo	Ast	Sck	TFL	Int	Yds	TD	Lng	PD	FF	FR	Yds	TD
2001	NYG	**16**	0	29	22	7	0.0	0	**1**	**14**	0	**14**	1	0	0	0	0
2002	NYG	15	14	82	60	22	0.0	8	**1**	1	0	1	4	0	**2**	0	0
2003	NYG	**16**	**16**	120	**93**	27	3.0	**10**	0	0	0	0	4	1	1	0	0
2004	PHI	**16**	15	72	49	23	0.5	7	**1**	0	0	0	5	0	1	0	0
2005	PHI	**16**	**16**	70	56	14	0.0	8	**1**	0	0	0	7	0	0	0	0
2006	PHI	**16**	13	76	55	21	0.5	4	0	0	0	0	6	0	0	0	0
2007	CIN	14	9	90	59	31	1.0	5	0	0	0	0	3	**2**	0	0	0
2008	CIN	**16**	**16**	116	75	**41**	0.0	6	**1**	13	0	13	**8**	1	1	0	0
2009	CIN	**16**	**16**	113	77	36	**3.5**	9	0	0	0	0	4	1	**2**	0	0
2010	CIN	**16**	**16**	**125**	86	39	1.0	3	0	0	0	0	2	1	0	0	0
		157	131	893	632	261	9.5	60	5	28	0	14	44	6	7	0	0

=== Postseason ===
Year	Team	Games		Tackles					Interceptions					Fumbles			
Year	Team	GP	GS	Cmb	Solo	Ast	Sck	TFL	Int	Yds	TD	Lng	PD	FF	FR	Yds	TD
2002	NYG	1	0	5	4	1	0.0	0	0	0	0	0	0	0	0	0	0
2004	PHI	**3**	**2**	3	2	1	0.0	0	0	0	0	0	**2**	0	0	0	0
2006	PHI	2	**2**	**11**	**8**	**3**	0.0	**2**	0	0	0	0	0	0	0	0	0
2009	CIN	1	1	7	6	1	0.0	0	0	0	0	0	0	0	0	0	0
		7	5	26	20	6	0.0	2	0	0	0	0	2	0	0	0	0

== Post-playing career ==
=== Dhani Tackles the Globe ===
Jones was the star of Dhani Tackles the Globe, a series for the Travel Channel in which he learns how to play international sports that are unknown to most Americans. For example, in the first season he played rugby union for English club, Blackheath. The show ran for two seasons.

=== Adventure Capitalists ===
Jones was a host/investor on the series Adventure Capitalists. This series first aired on August 22, 2016, on CNBC. Jones and other investors listen to pitches and try out products from new entrepreneurs. Jones and the other investors decided if they would like to invest in the entrepreneurs outdoor/adventure company.

== Business ventures ==
In 2010, Jones opened the Bow Tie Cafe in the historic Mount Adams neighborhood of Cincinnati, which sells coffee, drinks, cafe sandwiches.

Jones is a partner of VMG Creative, a New York City creative agency, with clients such as Michael Kors, Capital One, Estee Lauder, P&G.

Jones founded a creative agency, Proclamation, based in Cincinnati, and is chairman of Qey Capital Partners, an investment fund, both based in Cincinnati.

Jones is the CEO of Petram Data, a Company that uses pre-trained AI Models to reduce marketing spend and improve customer retention

== Personal life ==
In addition to his prowess as a professional athlete, Jones has shown a variety of skills off the field. Jones founded a company that sells high-end bowties, and he also wrote movie reviews and commentary for Page 2 on ESPN.com.

Jones is also an avid cyclist, using his fixed-gear bicycle to commute to practices and games throughout the year. He also participated in the cycling leg of the Durham Doughman Challenge on Travel Channel's Man v. Food. The challenge was a team quadrathlon consisting of running, swimming, cycling and food eating.

On June 7, 2011, Jones' book, The Sportsman: Unexpected Lessons from an Around-the-World Sports Odyssey, was released. The book talks about his experiences in football, travel, and life in general.

Jones is committed to several Cincinnati, OH charities and nonprofits. Among other positions, he serves on the boards of Breakthrough Cincinnati and the Cincinnati Art Museum. Jones founded a philanthropic organization, BowTie Cause, in 2010.

== Television ==
- Dhani Tackles the Globe (2009–2010) – Host – Travel Channel
- Timeless – Host – ESPN
- Ton of Cash (2011) – Host – VH1

Playbook360 (2011–2016) - Host - Spike

- GT Academy (2012–2014) – Host – Spike TV
- Spartan: Ultimate Team Challenge (2016–2017) – Host – NBC
- Adventure Capitalists (2016–2017) – Host – CNBC
