= Taweesin Visanuyothin =

Thai psychiatrist

- ทวีศิลป์ วิษณุโยธิน
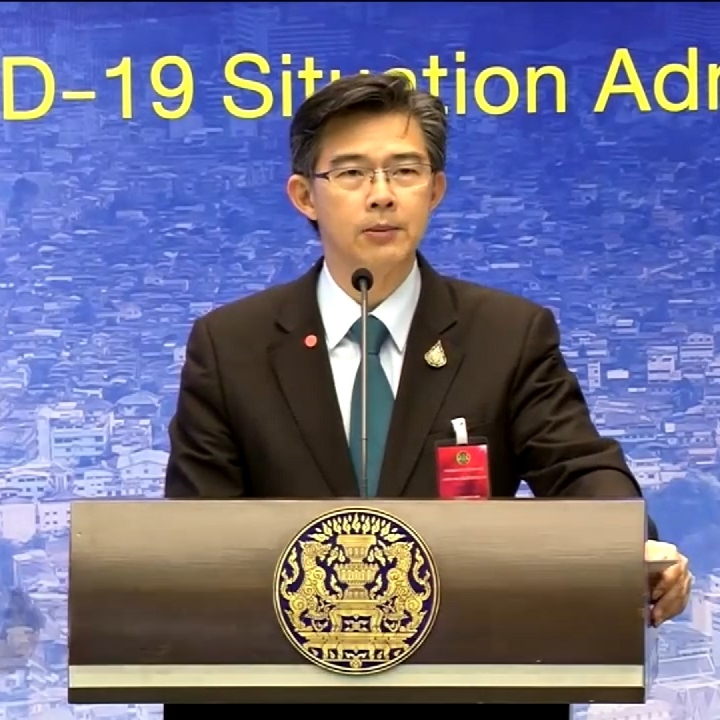
- Taweesin in Press Conference, 2020
- Born: 11 June 1965 (age 61)
- Other name: Taweesilp Visanuyothin (alternative spelling)
- Education: Faculty of Medicine, Khon Kaen University
- Occupations: Psychiatrist; Ministry of Public Health spokesperson
- Years active: 1989–present
- Known for: Spokesperson for Thai Ministry of Public Health and Center for the COVID-19 Situation Administration (CCSA)
- Spouse: Wilairat Visanuyothin
- Children: 2

Taweesin Visanuyothin (Thai: ทวีศิลป์ วิษณุโยธิน, RTGS: Thawisin Wisanuyothin; born 11 June 1965) is a Thai psychiatrist. He is widely noted for performing the duties of spokesperson for the Ministry of Public Health and the Center for the COVID-19 Situation Administration (CCSA) which gives brief daily summaries of the COVID-19 situation in Thailand.

== Early life, family and education ==
Taweesin was born in Nakhon Ratchasima province. He is the second of five children of Wengkuang and Phennapha Sae-to. His family has a small shop located in front of the Second Nakhon Ratchasima Municipality Marketplace. His father had lost his leg because of an accident when Taweesin was young. After that incident, every family member, including Taweesin, worked laboriously, such as pig farming and bag folding.

Taweesin studied at Anuban Nakhon Ratchasima School, Bun Watthana School. He graduated from the Faculty of Medicine, Khon Kaen University in 1989. In 1994, he decided to study in the Department of Psychiatry, University of Illinois College of Medicine, in the United States. He has completed in Certificate Fellow in Neuropsychiatry.

Taweesin is married to Wilairat Visanuyothin, a pediatrician, and has two children, That and Thanawin.

== Work ==
After his graduation from Khon Kaen University, he had worked at Nakhon Ratchasima Rajanagarindra Psychiatric Hospital for two years. Afterwards, he studied at the Somdet Chaopraya Institute of Psychiatry and worked as a psychiatrist and lecturer there until 1994. After he returned from study abroad, he continued working at Somdet Chaopraya Institute. During that time, he was noted for answering mental health question via various media. Since 2003, he has been promoted to work at Ministry of Public Health and was appointed to be a spokesperson for the Department of Mental Health and for the Ministry respectively.

On 26 March 2020, during COVID-19 pandemic in Thailand he was appointed to be the spokesperson of the Center of COVID-19 Situation Administration (CCSA) by the CCSA board, led by Prayut Chan-o-cha.

== Royal decorations ==
Taweesin has received the following royal decorations:

- Order of the Crown of Thailand, Knight Grand Cordon (Special Class)
- Order of the White Elephant, Knight Grand Cross (First Class)
- Chakrabarti Mala Medal

== Filmography ==
=== Films ===
Title	Year	Role	Ref.
Ong-Bak: Muay Thai Warrior	2003	Doctor Sak	
Chocolate	2008	Doctor Treat Zen's	

=== Dramas ===
Title	Year	Role	Ref.
Four Reigns (Phra Pokklaoracha Konawathippatai)	2008	An	
