= Dhani Tackles the Globe =

- Genre: Documentary; Sports; Adventure; Reality
- Presented by: Dhani Jones
- Narrated by: Dhani Jones
- Country of origin: United States
- Original language: English
- No. of seasons: 2
- No. of episodes: 20

Production
- Production location: Worldwide
- Running time: 45–48 minutes

Original release
- Network: Travel Channel
- Release: March 19, 2009 – June 22, 2010

Dhani Tackles the Globe is an American documentary television series hosted by former NFL linebacker Dhani Jones of the Cincinnati Bengals and Philadelphia Eagles, that aired on the Travel Channel. The series follows Jones around the globe as he learns how to play international sports and simultaneously explores the culture of each location. It was cancelled after two seasons.

== Episodes ==
=== Season One ===
- Thailand – Dhani travels Thailand to train as a muay Thai kick boxer and learn about Thai culture. In his lone match, he defeats his Thai opponent with a second-round knockout using leg kicks.
- Switzerland – Dhani travels to Switzerland to train in the Swiss sport of schwingen. Relying on his high school wrestling skills, as well as new techniques taught by his Swiss coach, Dhani won 2 of 4 matches against Swiss opponents in the first round, before bowing out in the single elimination final round.
- England – In January 2008 Dhani played in a rugby union match in England for Blackheath R.C. in the EDF Energy Trophy against Launceston RUFC and went fox hunting in the English countryside.
- Singapore – Dhani travels to Singapore to compete in the sport of dragon boat racing. Dhani trains with the Singapore and American teams and competes as part of the American team, which wins its preliminary heat, but loses in the second round to Singapore. Cultural activities include getting a pedicure from live sucker fish, eating frog's legs porridge, and the dreaded Durian fruit.
- Spain – Dhani travels to the Basque region of Spain to learn to play jai alai. Unlike prior shows where the training was more intense, the focus for this episode is the cultural aspects (food, wine, etc.) of the Basque region. In his sole match, Dhani and his coach (one of the top jai alai players in Spain) defeated their opponents.
- Cambodia – Dhani travels to Phnom Penh, Cambodia where he learns pradal serey with Kru Long Salavorn. He also travels to Angkor and takes in some Cambodian culture, including a youth break dancing center. At the Cambodian Television Network boxing stadium, he wins a three-round decision over his opponent.
- Australia – Dhani trains for and participates in a surf lifesaving competition.
- New Zealand – As part of his tour Dhani visits several sailing syndicates in New Zealand competing for the Louis Vuitton Pacific Series. He works as a grinder on Team New Zealand's yacht and sails as the 18th man with Team Origin.
- Ireland – Dhani travels to Ireland to play hurling. He also visits the Guinness brewery.
- Russia – Dhani travels to St. Petersburg, Russia and practices the Russian military sport of sambo. He also visits a Russian military base outside of the city.

=== Season Two ===
- Italy – First aired on April 19, 2010. Dhani travels to Italy to compete in a local cycling race in the Italian Alps. Dhani trains with a stage winner of the Giro d'Italia and learns more about the local culture in Northern Italy. Given his substantial upper body when compared to a typical cyclist, Dhani struggled with the initial climb of this race, and comes in several hours behind the winners. It was one of the few events where Dhani himself noted he "didn't have a chance to win". Nevertheless, he finished and gained a newfound respect for the grueling aspects of this sport.
- Senegal – First aired on April 26, 2010. Dhani travels to Senegal to train and compete in the Senegalese wrestling style known as Lutte. Dhani is matched with a revered Senegalese wrestler, known as "Bombardier", who trains him and introduces him to aspects of Senegalese culture. Relying on his high school wrestling skills as well as new techniques taught by his coach, Dhani won his lone match.
- Iceland – First aired on May 3, 2010. Dhani visits Iceland and competes in a strongman competition. The competition consists of several events testing the participant's strength and endurance. Dhani generally does well in training and seems to impress his coaches. After visiting a few sites, Dhani competes in a local event. Despite his lack of training and experience, he is one of the few contestants to complete every event and ends up in second place out of a dozen or more competitors.
- Jamaica – First aired on May 10, 2010. Dhani visits Jamaica and learns how to play cricket. As many Americans who grew up playing baseball, he initially has problems with fundamentals (i.e. dropping the bat as one would do in baseball but not in cricket). However he eventually gets the hang of it to take a couple of wickets and make some bowling and fielding plays.
- Croatia – First aired on May 17, 2010. Dhani travels to the port city of Dubrovnik, Croatia to learn water polo. Although a strong swimmer, Dhani appears exhausted by the training regimen of the local water polo club. While there, he takes in the cultural scene, traveling to a nearby village where shellfish are harvested, and he visits the oldest continuously operated pharmacy in the world. Being an enthusiast of bow ties, he shops at what is believed to be the first shop to produce neckties, (known originally as the cravat). In his single water polo match, Dhani sees some action on defense and scores a goal on offense.
- South Africa – First aired on May 24, 2010. In celebration of the 2010 World Cup Dhani travels to South Africa to learn soccer. In addition to training with a local club team, he gets to go cage diving and get face to face with great white sharks. In the lone match, Dhani plays the majority of the game on defense. However he was called upon to take a penalty kick and scored a goal for his team.
- Mexico – First aired June 14, 2010. In his most outrageous show to date Dhani travels to Mexico City, Mexico to become a lucha libre wrestler. The show begins where he and his interpreter are sitting ringside, when Máscara Año 2000, Jr. is tossed out of the ring in front of them. Words are exchanged between Máscara Año 2000, Jr. and the interpreter, and Dhani intervenes on behalf of his guide. After security separates them, Máscara Año 2000, Jr. and Dhani each announce to the crowd that they will wrestle next week to "settle" their dispute. After engaging in some cultural activities, the real action takes place when Dhani practices the full panoply of high-flying moves that make lucha libre entertaining. The match between Dhani and Máscara Año 2000, Jr. is action packed, and after a long battle, Dhani pins his opponent. However, Dhani is later disqualified for a low blow to his opponent.
- Scotland – Highland Games
- Brazil – Beach volleyball
- Nepal – Everest Base Camp

== See also ==
- Last Man Standing, UK series in which competitors travel the world and participate in traditional sports
