= Mercury Man =

2006 Thai superhero film

- Thai film poster
- Directed by: Bhandit Thongdee
- Written by: Joe Wannapin; Bhandit Thongdee; Songsak Mongkolthong
- Produced by: Prachya Pinkaew; Sukanya Vongstthapat
- Starring: Wasan Khantaau; Metinee Kingpayom; Arnon Saisangchan; Jinvipa Kheawkunya; Parinya Kiatbusaba; Darunee Khrittabhunyalai
- Cinematography: Sittipong Kongtong
- Edited by: Sudtipon Tubtim
- Music by: Traithep Wongpaiboon
- Distributed by: Sahamongkol Film International
- Release date: August 10, 2006
- Running time: 101 minutes
- Country: Thailand
- Languages: Thai; English
- Budget: 60 million baht

Mercury Man (Thai: มนุษย์เหล็กไหล or Ma noot lhek lai) is a 2006 Thai superhero martial arts action film. It is directed by Bhandit Thongdee with martial arts choreography by Panna Rittikrai of Ong-Bak, Tom-Yum-Goong and Born to Fight.

== Plot ==
After being stabbed with an ancient Tibetan amulet and having escaped to hospital, a Bangkok firefighter named Chan is transformed into a superhero when his body becomes a massive heat source, which he learns to manipulate to give him super strength, increased agility and the ability to make great leaps.

Chan's fate is entwined with an Afghan terrorist, Osama bin Ali, who wants the power of the Tibetan amulet to use in a plot to destroy the United States. With his international terrorist organization, led by henchwoman Areena, Osama kidnaps Chan's mother and sister (played by famed transgender Thai kickboxer Parinya Kiatbusaba) and takes them to the Royal Thai Navy base, where he hopes to launch a rocket at a US Navy chemical weapon ship. Osama also has suicide bombers spread out throughout Thailand, stationed in American franchises in Thailand, ready to act on his word.

Aided by the young female guardian of the amulet, Chan rescues his mother and sister. However, he must face Areena, who has stabbed herself with a companion amulet, giving her the powers of extreme cold and ice.

== Production ==
Similar to Ong-Bak, which was also choreographed by Panna Rittikrai and produced by Prachya Pinkaew, Mercury Man contains "shout outs" to Western films. References to Spider-Man are seen throughout Mercury Man, in dialogue, in Spider-Man T-shirts worn by extras and through spray-painted messages in the scenery, such as "Spidy how R U?"

== Soundtrack ==
Arnon Saisangchan (Osama bin Ali), is the lead singer of the Thai rock band Blackhead. Known as Phu Blackhead, he sings the song heard over the closing credits.
