= Panna Rittikrai =

Thai actor and director

- พันนา ฤทธิไกร
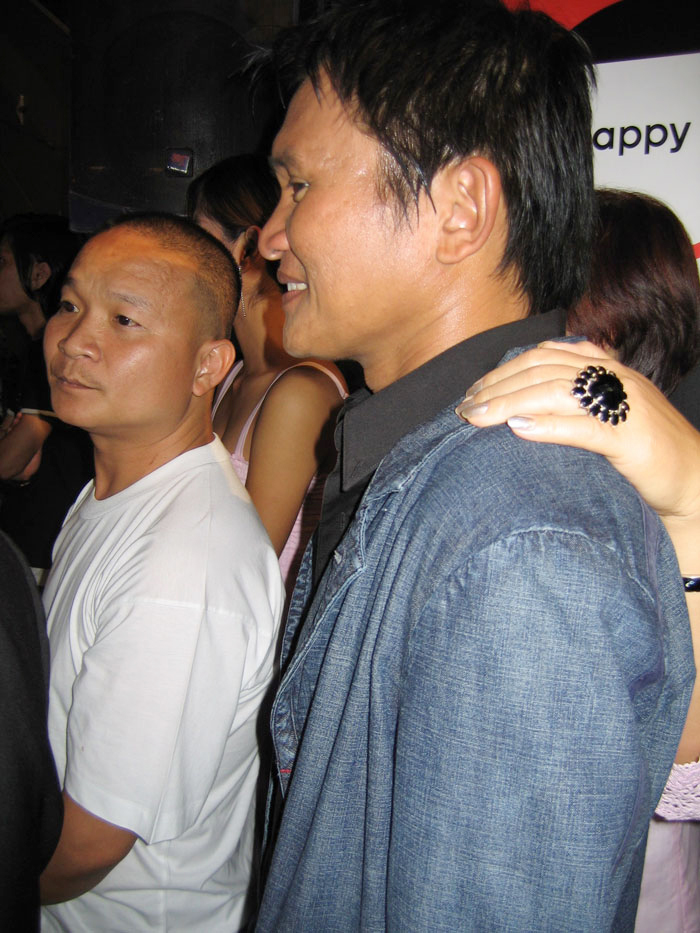
- Actor/comedian Petchtai Wongkamlao (left), and director Panna Rittikrai attend ceremonies for the press screening of Tom-Yum-Goong at Major Cineplex Ratchayothin in Bangkok on August 4, 2005.
- Born: Krittiya Lardphanna; February 17, 1961; Khon Kaen, Thailand
- Died: July 20, 2014 (aged 53); Bangkok, Thailand
- Education: Maha Sarakham Physical Education Institute (BA)
- Occupations: Martial arts choreographer; film director; screenwriter; actor
- Spouse: Laksana Saothongchai

Panna Rittikrai (Thai: พันนา ฤทธิไกร; RTGS: Phanna Ritthikrai) or birth name Krittiya Lardphanna (Thai: กฤติยา ลาดพันนา; RTGS: Krittiya Latphanna, February 17, 1961 – July 20, 2014) was a Thai martial arts action choreographer, film director, screenwriter, and actor. The head of the Muay Thai Stunt team (previously known as P.P.N. Stunt Team), he is best known for his work as a martial arts and action choreographer on the 2003 film Ong-Bak and 2005's Tom-Yum-Goong (known as The Protector in the US), starring Tony Jaa, whom Panna mentored.

== Biography ==
=== Early films ===
"You've probably never heard of my movies," Panna told the Bangkok Post in a 2004 interview. "They are popular among taxi drivers and som tam vendors and security guards and Isan coolies. My loyalest fans are folk people in the far-out tambons, where they lay out mattresses on the ground and drink moonshine whisky while watching my outdoor movies."

Born in Khon Kaen Province, Thailand, Panna started out in the movie business in 1979 as a physical trainer for actors in Bangkok. Learning a little about filmmaking and inspired by the movies of Jackie Chan and Bruce Lee, as well as stunts seen in James Bond movies, Panna moved back to Khon Kaen and formed his own stunt team, the P.P.N. Stunt Team (actually known as Muay Thai Stunt) and set about making films.

His first was Gerd ma lui (Born to Fight), which he remade in 2004.

=== International fame ===
With the worldwide releases of Ong-Bak and Tom-Yum-Goong, with their gritty, hard-hitting stunts, action-film fans the world over have wanted to see more, so film distributors are starting to release some of Panna's older titles on DVDs geared for the international market. Among the films finding new life on the home video market are Spirited Killer, or Puen Hode, co-starring Tony Jaa, as well as Mission Hunter 2, in which Jaa portrays a villain.

Panna's martial-arts choreography work also can be seen in the action-comedy, The Bodyguard, which starred and was directed by Thai comic actor Petchtai Wongkamlao. Recent and upcoming projects include Mercury Man, a Thai superhero film in which he coordinated the martial arts; the sequel to Ong-Bak, Ong Bak 2; and Chocolate, a film directed by Prachya Pinkaew starring a female martial artist, Yanin Vismistananda. He co-starred in Dynamite Warrior, a 2006 martial-arts action comedy set in 19th century Siam and starring Dan Chupong from Born to Fight. It was Panna's first acting role in 9 years.

=== Death ===
Panna Rittikrai had been receiving treatment for liver disease since November 2013. Rittikrai died in a hospital in Bangkok from complications brought on by acute liver and kidney failure on July 20, 2014. It was also later discovered that he had a brain tumor.

== Main filmography ==
=== Actor ===
Year	Title	Translated/Romanized title	Role	Notes
1982	ไอ้ผาง ร.ฟ.ท.	Ai Phang R.F.T.		
1983	ไอ้ ป.4 ไม่มีเส้น	Ai Por 4 Mai Mi Sen		
1983	พยัคฆ์ยี่เก	Dragon Killer		
1984	สิงห์รถบรรทุก 2	Sing Rod Bann Took 2		
1984	ข้ามากับพระ	Ka Ma Kub Pra		
1986	เกิดมาลุย	Gerd Ma Lui	Tong	Director
1986	น.ส.กาเหว่า	No So Ka Wao		
1986	ซิ่งวิ่งลุย	Sing Wing Lui (a.k.a. Run Thug Run)		Director, screenplay
1986	2นักสู้ผู้ยิ่งใหญ่	Thai Police Story		Director
1987	ปลุกมันขึ้นมาฆ่า	Plook Mun Kuen Ma Kah (a.k.a. Wake Up to Kill)		Director
1987	ข้าจะใหญ่ใครอย่าขวาง	Kah Jah Yai Krai Yah Kwang		
1987	เกิดมาลุย ภาค 2	Gerd Ma Lui 2		
1988	เพชรลุยเพลิง	Petch Lui Plerng		
1988	ฅนเถื่อน กทม	Khon Tuen Kor Tor Mor		
1988	คนหินจอมทรหด	Khon Hin Jorm Torrahod		
1988	เพชรฆาตเดนสงคราม	Mission Hunter (a.k.a. Dark Day Express)		
1989	ปลุกมันขึ้นมาฆ่า 2	Plook Mun Kuen Ma Kah 2 (Wake Up to Kill 2)		Director
1989	สู้ลุยแหลก	Soo Lui Laek		
1989	ลำเพลินโหด	Lum Pleung Hod		
1989	โหดตามคิว	Hod Tarm Kheew (a.k.a. Huk Lhiem Torrachon)		
1989	สมิงดงดิบ	Sa Ming Dong Dib		
1989	โหด	Hod		
1989	บ้าดีเดือด	Ba Dee Duek		
1989	โหดตามสั่ง	Hod Tarm Sung		
1989	เชือด..เชือดนิ่มนิ่ม 3	Iron Angels 3	Thai boxer	
1989	เสี่ยงตาย	Sieng Tai		
1989	มนต์เพลงรัก	Mon Pleng Ruk		
1990	เกิดมาลุย 3 อัดเต็มพิกัด	Gerd Ma Lui 3 (a.k.a. Born to Fight 3)		Director
1990	บ่อเพลิงที่โพทะเล	Bor Plerng Tee Pho Talae (a.k.a. River of Fire)		Director
1990	ตี๋ใหญ่ 2	Tee Yai 2		
1990	กองทัพเถื่อน	Kong Tub Tooan		
1990	ปลุกมันขึ้นมาฆ่า 3	Plook Mun Kuen Ma Kah 3		
1990	เพชฌฆาตดำ	Black Killer		
1990	ไอ้แจ้งมีเมีย	Ai Jang Mee Mia	Ai Jang	
1990	คู่เดือด	Koo Duek		
1990	ตะบันเพลิง	Taban Plung		
1990	3 อันตราย	3 Ann Ta Rai		
1990	หินตัดเหล็ก	Hin Tud Lhek		
1990	ไอ้เพชร บ.ข.ส.	Ai Petch Bor Kor Sor	Ai Petch	Director
1990	อาถรรพณ์เสือสมิง	A Tung Suer Saming (a.k.a. Black Magic Tiger)		
1990	บ้าแล้วต้องฆ่า	Ba Laew Tong Kha (a.k.a. Crazy and Must Kill)		
1990	หัวใจเหล็ก	Hua Jai Lek		
1990	เพชฌฆาตเหล็ก	Killer Lek		
1990	เชือด ๆ เหน่อ ๆ	Chuek Chuek Nuer Nuer		
1990	ก่อนจะสิ้นแสงตะวัน	Kon Ja Sing Sang Tawan		
1990	ขุมทรัพย์เมืองลับแล	Koon Sub Muang Lab Lae		
1990	เจาะนรกเผด็จศึก	Jok Narok Pa Dek Suk (a.k.a. Piercing Hell Dictatorship)		
1991	พยัคฆ์ร้าย เซี่ยงชุน	Payuk Rai Chiang Choon (a.k.a. The Chiang Choon Fighter)		Director, screenplay
1991	แบ๊งค์เถื่อน	Bang Tueng		
1991	ทะนง (ระห่ำสะท้านโลก)	Ta Nong Ra Hum Sa Tarn Lok		
1991	ท้าลุย	Ta Loui		
1991	2 เดนนรก	2 Dan Na Rok		
1991	ตังเกเดือด	Tang Kae Duak		
1991	หน่วยรบทมิฬ 1728	Noui Rob Ta Mi 1728		
1991	เลือดเข้าตา	Luad Kao Ta		
1991	เพชฌฆาตโหดสิงห์ป่าซุง	Killer Hod Sing Pa Soong		
1991	มือปราบสองแผ่นดิน	Mue Plab Song Pan Din		
1991	ใหญ่โค่นใหญ่	Yai Khon Yai		
1991	ลุยทะลุฟ้า	Lui Talu Fah		
1991	แผนกับดัก	Paen Kab Dak		
1991	เจ้าทรงปืน	Gun of God		
1991	ผ่าโลกมาลุย	Pha Lok Ma Loui		
1991	เจาะนรก 2 ตอน ดิบกระแทกดิบ	Jok Narok 2 Dib Kra Tak Dib		
1991	ระห่ำ 100%	Ra Hum 100%		
1991	ทัพนางพญา	Tap Nang paya		
1991	สิงห์เหนือ เสืออีสาน	Sing Nua Sua Isaan		
1991	พี่นักร้องน้องนักเลง	Pee Nuk Rong Nong Nuk Leng		
1991	ปลุกมันขึ้นมาฟัดผีกัด	Plook Mun Kuen Mah Fad Phee Kad (a.k.a. Awakened Zombie Battles)		
1991	สงครามผี	Song Kram Phee (a.k.a. Ghost War)		Director
1991	สองโทน	Song Tone		
1991	ผู้ใหญ่บ้านกระดูกเหล็ก	Poo yai Bann Kra Dook Lek		
1991	ยอดคนเสือภูเขา	Yord Kon Suer Poo Kao		
1991	คัมภีร์นักเลง	Kampee Nak Leng		Director
1991	มือขวาอาถรรพ์	Muer Kra A Tang		
1991	ทะลุฟ้ามาเกิด	Tha Loo Fa Ma Kerd		
1992	ไอ้เพชร บ.ข.ส. 2	Ai Petch Bor Kor Sor 2		Director
1992		Liu Talu Fah (a.k.a. Young Angel)		Director, writer, stung coordinator
1992	ทายาท.. ไอ้ผาง ร.ฟ.ท.	Tayard.. Ai Phang R.F.T.		
1992	โป้ง โป้ง ชึ่ง	Pong Pong Chung		
1992	นักร้องคะนองปืน	Nak Rong Ka Nong Puen		
1992	ลิงลากหาง ไอ้ช้างถีบ	Ling Lark Harng Ai Charng Teeb		
1992	จอมคาถา	Jom Ka Ta		
1992	โหดล่าหิน	Hod Lah Hin		
1992	สิงห์สยาม	Singh Siam (a.k.a. Siamese Lion)	Ryan	Director, writer, student coordinator
1992	เพชฌฆาตดำ 2	Black Killer 2		
1992	ล้างเมืองคนดุ	Lang Muang Kon Dook		
1993	ปีนเกลียว	Peen Gleaw		
1993	กวนโอ๊ย	Kuan Ouy		
1993	ทูตมรณะ	Tood Mor Rana (a.k.a. Angel of Death)		Director, writer
1993	ปลัดบ้านนอก	Plak Bann Nok		
1993	อสูรกาย คนไม่ใช่คน	Asoolkai Khon Mai Chai Kohn		
1994	นักเลงกลองยาว	Nuk Leng Klong Yao (a.k.a. The Rowdy Bunch)		Director
1994	เสือล่าเสือ	Suer La Suer		
1994	สยึ๋มกึ๋ย 2	Sayim Kia 2		
1994	นักฆ่าหน้าหยก	Nak Kha Na Yok		
1994	1+5 ฟ้าก็ห้ามไม่ได้	1+5 Fa Kor Ham Mai Dai		
1994	ควงเธอมาปล้น	Kuang Ther Mar Plon (a.k.a. Bangkok Hooligans)		Director
1994	พยัคฆ์ร้าย เซี่ยงชุน 2	Payuk Rai Chiang Choon 2		
1994	มนต์เพลงนักเลงบ้านนอก	Mon Pleng Nak Leng Bann Nok		
1994	ปลุกมันขึ้นมาฆ่า 4	Plook Mun Kuen Ma Kah 4 (a.k.a. Spirited Killer)	Spirited Killer	Director
1995	ข้ามากับปืน	Kah Mar Kub Puen		
1995	นักสู้เมืองอีสาน	Esan Fighter		
1995	ปีนเกลียว 2	Peen Gleaw 2		
1995	คนมหากาฬ	Khon Maha Kaf		
1995	กองทัพเถื่อน 2	Kong Tub Tooan 2		
1995	อัดแหลก ไอ้เพชร บขส. - ไอ้ผาง รฟท.	Ath Laek Ai Petch Bor Kor Sor - Ai Phang R.F.T.		
1996	มือปราบปืนโหด	Mue Prab Puen Hode (a.k.a. Hard Gun)		
1996	คนดิบ เหล็กน้ำพี้	Kon Dib Lhek Nam Pee		Director
1996	เพชรฆาตเดนสงคราม 2	Mission Hunter 2 (a.k.a. Battle Warrior)	Zombie	
1996	ฅนลูกทุ่ง	Kon Look Toong		
1997	ปู่ตา คาถาถล่มคน	Puta Khatha Thalom Khon		Director
1997	เซี่ยงชุน 3 พยัคฆ์ร้ายครกแตก	Chiang Choon 3: Payuk Rai Krok Taek		
1997	ล้างเมืองคนดุ 2	Lang Muang Kon Dook 2		
1997	แก๊งกระแทกก๊วน	Kang Kra Taek Kouan		
1997	คนสารพัดพิษ	Khon Sa Ra Pak Pik		
1997	ปีนเกลียว 3	Peen Gleaw 3		
1998	มังกรทมิฬ	Black Dragon		
1998	พญาไฟบรรลัยกัลป์	Paya Fai Bann Lai Kal		
2003	องค์บาก	Ong Bak	Villager (uncredited)	Martial arts choreographer, story writer
2005	ต้มยำกุ้ง	Tom-Yum-Goong		Martial arts choreographer
2006	ฅนไฟบิน	Dynamite Warrior	Nai Hoi Dam/Black Wizard	
2010	โคตรสู้ โคตรโส	Bangkok Knockout	Suthep Sisai	Director, story writer, production
2010	ครูบ้านนอก บ้านหนองฮีใหญ่	Kroo Bann Nok Bann Nong Hee Yai (a.k.a. The Country Teacher of Ban Nong He Yai)	Teacher Phan	
2013	เดอะสตันต์	The Stunt		

=== Crew ===
Year	Title	Title in Latin characters	Director	Producer	Choreographer	Other
2001	สุริโยไท	The Legend of Suriyothai			Yes	
2004	บอดี้การ์ดหน้าเหลี่ยม	The Bodyguard	Yes		Yes	
2004	เกิดมาลุย	Born to Fight	Yes		Yes	Writer
2006	มนุษย์เหล็กไหล	Ma noot lhek lai (a.k.a. Mercury Man)			Yes	
2008	องค์บาก 2	Ong-Bak 2	Yes	Yes	Yes	Writer
2008	ช็อคโกแลต	Chocolate (a.k.a. Zen, Warrior Within)		Yes	Yes	
2009	จีจ้า ดื้อ สวย ดุ	Raging Phoenix		Yes	Yes	
2009	5 หัวใจฮีโร่	Power Kids		Yes		
2010	องค์บาก 3	Ong Bak 3	Yes			Writer
2011	ต้มยำกุ้ง 2	Tom Yum Goong 2 (a.k.a. The Protector 2, Warrior King 2, Return of the Warrior)		Yes	Yes	
2011		Jukkalan (a.k.a. This Girl Is Bad-Ass!!)			Yes	
2011	อุโมงค์ผาเมือง	At the Gate of the Ghost			Yes	
2014	เร็วทะลุเร็ว	Vengeance of an Assassin	Yes			Writer
