= Dança de Guerra =

Dance of war
- Danca da guerra
- Directed by: Jair Moura
- Written by: Jair Moura
- Produced by: Jair Moura
- Starring: João Grande; João Pequeno
- Narrated by: William Mendonça
- Cinematography: Luiz Gonzaga
- Edited by: Mario Murakami
- Music by: Bimba, Tiburcinho, Totonho de Maré, Noronha
- Release date: 1972
- Running time: 18 minutes
- Country: Brazil
- Language: Portuguese

Dança de Guerra (Dance of War) is a short movie from 1972, directed by Jair Moura.

== Interpretations ==
Capoeira was included by Moura.

== Literature ==
- Desch-Obi, M. Thomas J. (2008). Fighting for Honor: The History of African Martial Art Traditions in the Atlantic World. Columbia: University of South Carolina Press. ISBN 978-1-57003-718-4.
