= Parinya Charoenphol =

Thai boxer (born 1981)

- ปริญญา เจริญผล
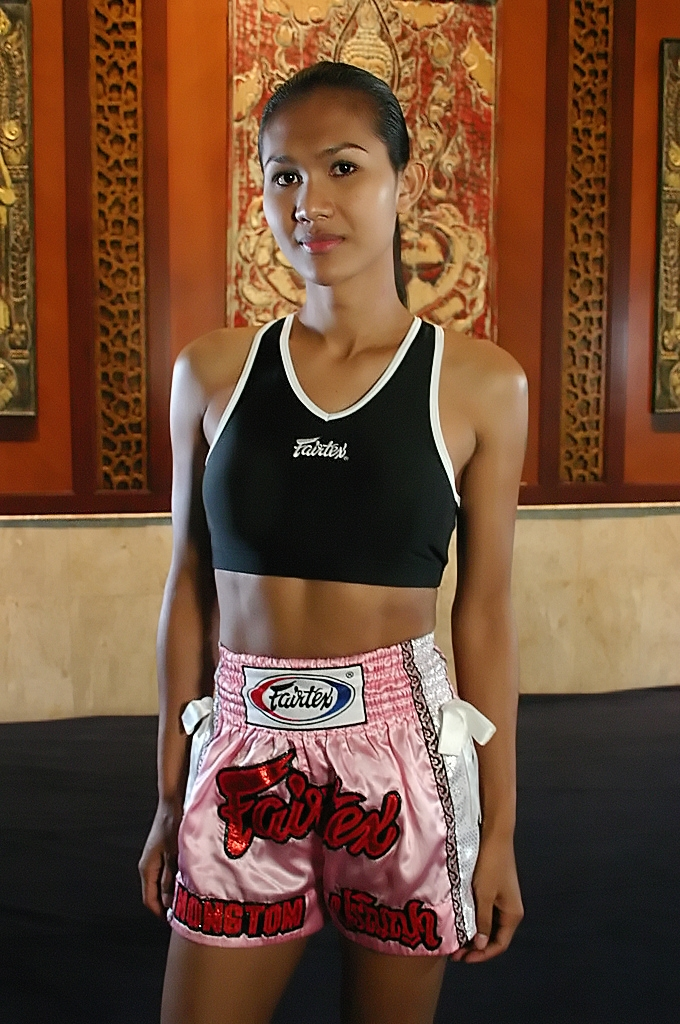
- Parinya Charoenphol at Fairtex Gym in Bangkok.
- Born: 9 June 1981 (age 45); Chiang Mai, Thailand
- Other names: Toom (ตุ้ม); Nong Toom (น้องตุ้ม); Parinya Kiatbusaba
- Occupations: Muay Thai boxer; actress; model
- Height: 1.75m (5 ft 8 in)

Parinya Charoenphol (Thai: ปริญญา เจริญผล, RTGS: Parinya Charoenphon; born 9 June 1981), nicknamed Toom, (Note: Thai: ตุ้ม; RTGS: tum) also known by the stage name Parinya Kiatbusaba (Note: Thai: ปริญญา เกียรติบุษบา; RTGS: parinya kiatbutsaba) and the colloquial name Nong Toom or Nong Tum, (Note: Thai: น้องตุ้ม; RTGS: nong tum; meaning 'Lil Sis Toom') is a Thai boxer, former muay Thai (Thai boxing) champion, model and actress. She . She is a kathoey (ladyboy), a Thai word referring to what is often considered a distinct gender in Thailand and elsewhere generally considered to be gender-nonconforming men or transgender women. At the age of 18, she underwent gender-affirming surgery.

== Career and current projects ==
Her public life began in February 1998, with a victory in Bangkok's Lumpini Boxing Stadium, the centre of the Muay Thai world. The Thai media were intrigued by the novelty and incongruity of a makeup-wearing 16-year-old kathoey defeating and then kissing a larger, more muscular opponent.

Although the Thai government had previously blocked kathoeys from participating in the national volleyball team for fear of negative reaction from the rest of the world, the Muay Thai establishment embraced Nong Toom, and tourism officials promoted her as "indicative of the wonders to be found" in Thailand. Muay Thai had been in a several-year slump at the time, and Nong Toom had revitalised both media and public interest in the sport, as shown by increased ticket sales and stadium revenue.

She was profiled in several magazines, and appeared in many Thai music videos. Subsequently, her public profile began to fade, but her bouts with a foreigner, as well as her trip to Japan to fight a Japanese challenger, kept her in the news. By the autumn of 1998, there was little coverage of Nong Toom to be found in either the mainstream or boxing media.

In 1999, Nong Toom caused considerable publicity by announcing her retirement from kick boxing, her intention to become a singer, and her plan to undergo sex reassignment surgery. She was initially turned down by some of the Bangkok surgeons she turned to, but was able to undergo sex reassignment surgery in 1999 at Yanhee International Hospital.

On 26 February 2006, Nong Tum made her comeback as boxer. She fought an exhibition match for Fairtex Gym's new Pattaya branch (re-dubbed Nong Toom Fairtex Gym) by fighting a 140-pound contest against Japan's Kenshiro Lookchaomaekhemthong. Nong Toom won by unanimous decision after the three-round fight, leaving her rival with a cut near his eye from an elbow in the last round.

Nong Toom was planning another exhibition bout for sometime in 2006 with a female boxer Lucia Rijker, who portrayed the lethal "Blue Bear" in the film Million Dollar Baby.

Nong Toom's first fight post-transition was in October 2007 versus Jorina Baars in Arnhem, the Netherlands.

On 31 May 2008 Nong Toom had a fight against Pernilla Johansson at Rumble of the Kings in Stockholm, Sweden, and won by decision.

In 2010, Nong Toom opened a boxing camp, Parinya Muay Thai, in Pranburi, which she owned and operated with American actor-writer Steven Khan.

As of 2011, she was teaching Muay Thai and aerobics to children at the Baan Poo Yai School.

== Media appearances ==
Her story is related in the 2003 film Beautiful Boxer in which she was portrayed by male kickboxer Asanee Suwan. The film won several national and international awards, yet opened to limited success in Thailand. The film's director, Ekachai Uekrongtham, also wrote the solo performance Boxing Cabaret for Nong Toom which she performed in the summer of 2005 at the Singapore Arts Festival and later in Bangkok.

Nong Toom's life as a kathoey is also part of the book Ladyboys: The Secret World of Thailand's Third Gender by Maverick House Publishers.

Her story was also included in Julina Khusaini's National Geographic documentary Hidden Genders (2003).

She had a prominent role in the 2006 superhero film-action film Mercury Man, playing the title character's transgender sibling and demonstrating her kickboxing prowess on the villains. In 2006, she appeared as a guest star on SBS television series World Record Pizza and Rallarsving in Sweden.

== See also ==
- Patricio Manuel, the first publicly known transgender professional boxer in the United States
- Fallon Fox, the first publicly known transgender mixed martial arts athlete
