= Yanin Vismitananda =

Thai actress and martial artist

- ญาณิน วิสมิตะนันทน์
- Born: Nicharee Vismitananda; 31 March 1984 (age 42); Bangkok, Thailand
- Other name: Yanin Mitananda
- Education: Kasem Bundit University
- Occupations: Actress; martial artist
- Years active: 2008–present
- Spouse: Adrian Robert Bowden (m. 2012, divorced): Kazu Patrick Tang (m. 2020)
- Children: 2

Signature
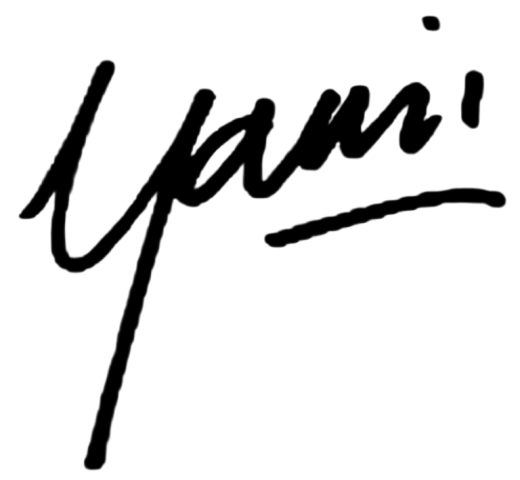

Yanin "Jeeja" Vismitananda (Thai: ญาณิน "จีจ้า" วิสมิตะนันทน์; RTGS: Yanin "Chicha" Wisamittanan), née Nicharee Vismitananda (Thai: ณิชชารีย์ วิสมิตะนันทน์; RTGS: Nitchari Wisamittanan; born 31 March 1984) is a Thai actress and martial artist. She specialises in Muay Thai. She is credited as Yanin Mitananda in Chocolate.

== Early life and education ==
Vismitananda was born in Bangkok to Prasita Vismitananda and Pawadol Borirak, a businessman who later died when Vismitananda was 17. She has an older brother, Nantapong "Jeed" Vismitananda. She is of Burmese, Chinese, English and Thai descent. Vismitananda holds a 4th Dan black belt in taekwondo. She received a bachelor's degree from Kasem Bundit University.

== Career ==
Vismitananda was discovered by Prachya Pinkaew in 2003.

Her film debut was the starring role in the film Chocolate (2008), and her second movie was Raging Phoenix (2009).

== Personal life ==
On 29 August 2012, Vismitananda revealed that she was five months pregnant, and married Adrian Robert Bowden, a co-star in her previous films and a younger brother of Thai singer Pamela Bowden. She also stated that she planned to suspend work for the following two years.. Vismitananda gave birth to a son, Jayden Bowden Vismitananda (เจย์เดน เบาว์เดน วิสมิตะนันทน์), on 22 January 2013. She and Bowden have since divorced and she is now married to her Raging Phoenix co-star, Kazu Patrick Tang. They have a daughter together.

== Filmography ==
=== Film ===
Year	Title	Role	Note	Ref.
2008	Chocolate	Zen		
2009	Raging Phoenix	Deu		
2011	This Girl Is Bad-Ass	Jukkalan		
2011	The Kick	Wawa		
2013	Tom Yum Goong 2	Ping-Ping		
2016	Never Back Down: No Surrender	Jeeja		
2016	Hard Target 2	Aldrich's Friend		
2017	Oversized Cops	Muay Thai Trainer	Special Appearance	
2018	Europe Raiders	"White Mantis"		
2019	Triple Threat	Mook		
2025	The Furious	Matia		

=== Television series ===
Year	Title	Role	Network	Notes	Ref.
2016	Kong Kra Pun Na Ree		Channel 3 (Thailand)		
2017	Halfworlds	Thip	HBO Asia		
2018	Monkey Twins	Tamako	GMM One		
2018	The Crown Princess	Petra	Channel 3 (Thailand)		
2021	Darna		Kapamilya Channel	Stunt Double: Jane De Leon	
2023–2026	FPJ's Batang Quiapo	Police Lieutenant Mai Mendoza	Kapamilya Channel		
