= FightWorld =

- Genre: Documentary
- Starring: Frank Grillo
- Country of origin: United States
- Original language: English
- No. of seasons: 1
- No. of episodes: 5

Production
- Running time: 41-44 min.

Original release
- Network: Netflix
- Release: October 12, 2018

FightWorld is a 2018 American docu-series, exploring the diverse fighting techniques found in cultures around the world. In each installment of the series, Frank Grillo travels to a different country to embed in the local fight culture, exploring various disciplines such as Boxing, Muay Thai, Lethwei, Senegalese wrestling and Krav Maga.

== Cast ==
- Frank Grillo
- Julio César Chávez
- Buakaw Banchamek
- Soe Lin Oo

== Episodes ==
Episode	Name	Description
1	Mexico: La Pistola y El Corazon	Actor Frank Grillo visits Mexico City, where he meets Julio César Chávez, speaks with aspiring boxers and learns the one rule of Mexican boxing.
2	Thailand: Fortunate Son	In Thailand, Grillo sees firsthand why Muay Thai and visits star Buakaw Banchamek.
3	Myanmar: Crossroads	Fighters from around the world travel to Myanmar for the World Lethwei Championship. Grillo trains with elite Lethwei fighter Soe Lin Oo.
4	Senegal: If I Should Fall from Grace with God	Grillo goes to Senegal along with countless passionate fans and gets caught up in the pageantry as two highly respected Senegalese wrestlers prepare to battle.
5	Israel: Masters of War	In Israel, Grillo receives a lesson on Krav Maga, a unique style of hand-to-hand combat used by citizens and military forces alike.

== Release ==
It was released for only one season with five episode on October 12, 2018 on Netflix streaming.
