= Lim Su-jeong (kickboxer) =

South Korean kickboxer

Lim Su-Jeong
- Born: October 17, 1985 (age 41); Seoul, South Korea
- Native name: 임수정
- Other names: Beautiful Fighter
- Nationality: South Korean
- Height: 1.66 m (5 ft 5 1/2 in)
- Weight: 57 kg (126 lb)
- Division: Bantamweight; Super bantamweight Featherweight
- Style: Muay Thai, Kickboxing
- Fighting out of: South Korea
- Team: T-Entertainment / Sam-san Eagle Gym
- Years active: 2004–2014

Mixed martial arts record
- Total: 1
- Wins: 1
- By decision: 1
- Losses: 0

Other information
- Mixed martial arts record from Sherdog

Lim Su-Jeong (Korean: 임수정, born October 17, 1985) is a former South Korean female Muay Thai kickboxer. She competes professionally since 2004 and is a former Southern Thailand Middleweight and South Korea Muay Thai Bantamweight Champion. Her good looks earned her the nickname Beautiful Fighter.

== Kickboxing career ==
Lim was born on October 17, 1985 in Seoul, South Korea. She started to train in Muay Thai for dieting when she was a high school student. She would be a quick learner, winning the South Korea Muay Thai Bantamweight title and the South Korean promotion Neo Fight Championship in 2006. At the age of 22, she went to Thailand for several months to practice Muay Thai. Here, she had success on the amateur circuit as well, winning bronze at the IMFA World Muaythai Championships 2007 held in Bangkok.

Lim then went on to have a very good 2009. Debuting in K-1, on March 20, 2009, she faced and defeated future shoot boxing champion Rena Kubota by split decision after an extra round. She followed it up with her third professional title - winning the Southern Thailand Middleweight title by outpointing Sowlor from Thailand. There was some disappointment, however, when she lost in an upset in her debut in shoot boxing. During the quarterfinals of Girls S-Cup 2009, on August 23, 2009, Lim, one of the favorites to win the cup, lost via unanimous decision against mixed martial artist Mei Yamaguchi, who was the eventual runner-up.

She closed 2009 by winning the King of the Ring Grand Prix at the event The Khan 2, held on November 27, 2009 in South Korea. Lim first defeated Czech Alena Hola by unanimous decision after three rounds, and next she defeated fellow South Korean Woo Yeon Park also by decision to win the championship belt.

Lim was given the chance to fight for a world title on May 28, 2011, taking on Christine Theiss for the WKA fullcontact World Middleweight Championship. In front of Theiss's hometown crowd she lost a close decision.

== Flames Sports Competition incident ==
Lim, who gained fame as the first Korean woman to compete in the K-1 mixed martial arts circuit, appeared on the TBS variety show *Flame Sports Club TV 2001*—broadcast on July 3, 2011—where she faced three Japanese male comedians in a three-round match. The program features competitions between female sports stars and male comedians that resemble real, full-contact fights. Her first opponent was Toshiaki Kasuga (32), a former college rugby player who had also competed in the K-1 tournament in 2007. Just eight seconds into the match, Lim was knocked down after being struck by consecutive knee strikes and low kicks from Kasuga, who outweighed her by 30 kilograms. As the situation grew serious, production staff halted filming during the first round. Lim explained, "I was angry at the sudden attack and considered quitting the shoot," adding, "but I gritted my teeth and continued because I thought stopping midway would only lead to worse injuries." The other participants, Hiroshi Shinagawa (39) and Koji Imada (45), also launched indiscriminate attacks on Lim that bordered on a beating. She was at a disadvantage compared to the male fighters; unlike them, she wore no protective headgear and used relatively oversized gloves. A representative from Lim's agency stated, "During our initial meetings with the broadcaster, we were told it was just a show and that there would be no strikes to the face." They continued, "However, contrary to that agreement, the match turned into a real fight right from the first round. We were shocked, so we stopped filming and lodged a protest with the broadcaster." However, Lim decided to continue the match, stating, "Even if the broadcaster lied, I cannot quit the game as a professional athlete." Ultimately, her condition worsened—including a tear in the inner muscle of her left shin—leaving her in need of two months of treatment; she had already been suffering from a leg injury at the time she was recruited for the event. This incident motivated the South Korean comedian, Hyung Bin Yoon, to become a professional MMA fighter. His debut in 2014 at the event, Road FC 014, was themed as a revenge match for Lim's incident in 2011. Yoon's opponent, Takaya Tsukuda, was billed as a Japanese ultranationalist fighter. Yoon defeated his Japanese opponent by TKO (via punches) in the first round.

== Outside sports ==
Aside from kickboxing and Muay Thai, Lim, who is nicknamed Beautiful Fighter because of her good looks, works as an actress as a side job. She appeared in TV series in South Korea and in the Thai martial arts film Chocolate.

== Titles ==
Professional

- 2009 King of the Ring Grand Prix Champion
- 2008 Southern Thailand Middleweight Champion
- 2006 South Korea Muay Thai Bantamweight Champion
- 2006 Neo Fight Bantamweight Champion
- 2004 Rookie of the year of the Korean Muaythai Association

Amateur

- 2007 IFMA World Muaythai Championships in Bangkok, Thailand (bronze) -54 kg

== Kickboxing record ==
Kickboxing record
wins ( KO's), losses, draw
Date	Result	Opponent	Event	Location	Method	Round	Time	Record
2013-10-02	Loss	(Morocco) Iman Chairi	World Muaythai Angels	Bangkok, Thailand	Decision (0–3)	3	2:00	
2013-02-02	Win	(China) Mao Ning	The Khan vs. Wulinfeng	Seoul, South Korea	Ext R. Decision (3–0)	4	3:00	
2012-01-15	Win	(Japan) Miku Hayashi	The Khan New Generation	Tokyo, Japan	Decision (3–0)	3	3:00	
2011-05-28	Loss	(Germany) Christine Theiss	Die Nacht der Champions	Munich, Germany	Decision (0–3)	10	2:00	
Fight was for the WKA fullcontact World Middleweight title
2010-03-28	Win	(Japan) Satoko Sasaki	J-Girls: Catch the stone 6	Tokyo, Japan	Ext R. Decision (2–0)	3	2:00	
2009-11-27	Win	(South Korea) Woo Yeon Park	The Khan 2, Final	Seoul, South Korea	Decision (3–0)	3	2:00	
Wins King of the Ring Grand Prix
2009-11-27	Win	(Czech Republic) Alena Hola	The Khan 2, Semi Finals	Seoul, South Korea	Decision (3–0)	3	2:00	
2009-09-26	Win	(China) Chen Qing	K-1 World Grand Prix 2009 in Seoul Final 16	Seoul, South Korea	Decision (3–0)	3	3:00	
2009-08-23	Loss	(Japan) Mei Yamaguchi	Shoot Boxing Girls Tournament 2009, Quarter Finals	Tokyo, Japan	Decision (0–3)	3	2:00	
2009-07-07	Loss	(Thailand) Phetnaree Krabi	Bangla Boxing Stadium	Phuket, Thailand	Decision	5	2:00	
2009-06-12	Win	(Thailand) NongMo	Bangla Boxing Stadium	Phuket, Thailand	TKO	2		
2009-06-07	Win	(Thailand) Yinggan Ranong	Bangla Boxing Stadium	Phuket, Thailand	TKO	2		
2009-05-19	Win	(Thailand) Sowlor	Patong Stadium	Phuket, Thailand	Decision	5	2:00	
Wins Southern Thailand Middleweight title
2009-05-04	Win	(Thailand) Sowler	Bangla Boxing Stadium	Phuket, Thailand	Decision	5	2:00	
2009-03-20	Win	(Japan) Rena Kubota	K-1 Award & MAX Korea 2009	Seoul, South Korea	Ext R. Decision (2–1)	4	2:00	
2008-09-12	Win	(Thailand)	Bangla Boxing Stadium	Phuket, Thailand	TKO	2		
2008	Win	(Thailand) Sowler	Patong Stadium	Phuket, Thailand	Decision	5	2:00	
2008-03-30	Win	(Australia) Ashley Lee	The Khan 1	Seoul, South Korea	TKO (broken nose)	3		
2007-12	Loss	(Netherlands) Jemyma Betrian	IFMA World Muaythai Championships 2007, Semi Finals	Bangkok, Thailand	Decision	3	2:00	
Wins IFMA World Muaythai Championships 2007 Bronze medal –54 kg
2007-12-01	Win	(Thailand)	IFMA World Muaythai Championships 2007, Quarter Finals	Bangkok, Thailand	Decision	3	2:00	
2006-11-23	Win	(South Korea) Yeon Sil Jeon	Neo Fight 9	Seoul, South Korea	Decision (3–0)	3	3:00	
2006-07-07	Loss	(Japan) Tomomi Sunaba	Cub*Kick's 3 days 1st - AJ Night: Tradition	Tokyo, Japan	Decision (0–2)	3	3:00	17-5
2006-06-03	Loss	(Russia) Olga Ivanova	IFMA World Muaythai Championships 2006, Quarter Finals	Bangkok, Thailand	Decision	3	2:00	17-4
Legend: Win Loss Draw/No contest Notes

== Mixed martial arts record ==
Professional record breakdown
1 match	1 win	0 losses
By knockout	0	0
By submission	0	0
By decision	1	0

Res.	Record	Opponent	Method	Event	Date	Round	Time	Location	Notes
Win	1–0	Emiko Raika	Decision (unanimous)	Revolution 2: Start of the Revolution	September 12, 2014	2	5:00	Seoul, South Korea	

== Filmography ==
=== Film ===
Year	Title	Role	Note	Reference
2008	Chocolate		Club fighters	

== See also ==
- List of female kickboxers
