= Born to Fight (1986 film) =

- เกิดมาลุย
- Directed by: Panna Rittikrai
- Screenplay by: Panna Rittikrai
- Produced by: Chokchai Melewan
- Starring: Panna Rittikrai; Hernfah Khwangmhek
- Cinematography: Nattawut Kittikhun
- Production company: Pechpanna Productions
- Distributed by: Sahamongkol Film International
- Release date: 1986; (Thailand)
- Running time: 94 minutes
- Country: Thailand
- Language: Thai

Born to Fight (Thai: เกิดมาลุย, Gerd ma lui) is a 1986 Thai martial arts action film directed by Panna Rittikrai in his directorial debut.

== Plot ==
Siafong (Hernfah Khwangmhek) is a lawyer working for a crime family in Hong Kong. He acquires evidence that his wealthy client's devious son-in-law Tungseung has been stealing money from the family. Tungseung sends a deadly gang of martial artists known as the Green Dragons to silence Sianfong, who flees to Thailand. A Thai cop and martial artist named Tong (Panna Rittikrai) searches for the lawyer to have him returned alive to Hong Kong, fighting off gang members along the way.

== Cast ==
- Panna Rittikrai as Tong
- Hernfah Khwangmhek as Siafong

== Remake ==
Sahamongkol Film International produced a title-only remake of the film directed by Panna Rittikrai in 2004. It stars Dan Chupong and involves terrorists launching nuclear missiles from a small border village.
