= Born to Fight (2004 film) =

- Thai movie poster
- เกิดมาลุย
- Directed by: Panna Rittikrai
- Written by: Morakot Kaewthanee; Thanapat Taweesuk; Panna Rittikrai
- Based on: Born to Fight by Panna Rittikrai
- Produced by: Prachya Pinkaew; Sukanya Vongsthapat
- Starring: Dan Chupong; Nappon Gomarachun; Santisuk Promsiri; Piyapong Piew-on; Somluck Kamsing; Kessarin Ektawatkul
- Cinematography: Surachet Thongmee
- Edited by: Thanapat Taweesuk
- Music by: Traithep Wongpaiboon
- Production company: Baa-ram-ewe
- Distributed by: Sahamongkol Film International
- Release date: August 5, 2004
- Running time: 96 minutes
- Language: Thai

Born to Fight (Thai: เกิดมาลุย, Gerd ma lui) is a 2004 Thai action film directed by Panna Rittikrai. It followed Ong-Bak: Muay Thai Warrior, on which Rittikrai served as martial arts choreographer, and featured more of his "no strings attached" stuntwork. Many of the actors in Born to Fight were Thai national athletes. The film is a remake of Rittikrai's 1986 film of the same title.

== Plot ==
Royal Thai Police undercover cops Deaw and Puntakarn participate in a sting operation to apprehend the drug lord General Yang and shut down his cartel in the Chonburi Province. After a destructive truck chase, they manage to capture General Yang, but Puntakarn is killed by a bomb set by the drug lord in one of his trucks.

Hoping to relieve the pain of his loss, Deaw accompanies his sister, taekwondo champion Nui, to a charity event sponsored by the country's Sports Authority to distribute relief goods to Pha-thong Village, located near the Thai/Burmese border. Deaw and Nui, along with other athletes representing their respective sports, arrive at the village and entertain the locals.

All is going well when suddenly, an armed militia invades the village, killing a number of people and holding the rest hostage. The militia demands the release of General Yang within 24 hours in exchange for the lives of the surviving villagers; failure to comply will result in the militia broadcasting the slaughter of all of the villagers to the World. The Prime Minister's attempt at liberating the village fails when the militia's surveillance cameras spot Task Force 90 Thai special forces troops within the premises, resulting in more villagers being executed and the deadline shortened to 8:00 a.m. the next day. While infiltrating the militia's camp, Deaw discovers that they will fire a nuclear missile toward Bangkok once General Yang is released and then blow up the village after they escape. Before he can act, he is captured and thrown in with the rest of the villagers.

The next morning, General Yang is released from prison and airlifted toward Pha-thong Village. As the army helicopters arrive and the militia escorts the drug lord, a radio broadcast of the Thai National Anthem inspires the athletes and villagers to rise up and battle their captives. Unarmed, they attack the heavily armed soldiers and get some revenge for those murdered by them. General Yang is once again apprehended after the militia leader is killed and his escorts are gunned down by special forces agents. Deaw storms through the militia camp, but the nuclear missile is launched by a man left behind. In desperation, he destroys the camp's three laptops, sending the missile off course and crashing into the waters of the Gulf of Thailand, south of Bangkok. He then discovers that the militia has rigged time bombs to destroy the village in less than five minutes. With the help of the special forces, Deaw gets the athletes and surviving villagers to evacuate before the entire village goes up in flames but then as the deadline approaches he goes back to try and rescue Tup.

Behind-the-scenes shots of some of the many dangerous stunts play during the credits.

== Cast ==
- Dan Chupong as Deaw
- Nappon Gomarachun as General Yang
- Santisuk Promsiri as Lowfei
- Piyapong Piew-on as Tun
- Somluck Kamsing as Tup
- Amornthep Waewsang as Moo
- Suebsak Pansueb as Jo
- Nantaway Wongwanichislip as Nye
- Kessarin Ektawatkul as Nui
- Rattaporn Khemtong as Tunta
- Chattapong Pantana-Angkul as Fong
- Sasisa Jindamanee as Baetoey
- Wannakit Sirioput as Foh

=== Casting notes ===
- BBTV Channel 7 anchors Nilawan Thonglai and Apisamai Srirangson appear as themselves.
- Dan Chupong is a member of Rittikrai's stunt team, Muay Thai Stunt. He previously played "Bodyguard 4" in Ong-Bak: Muay Thai Warrior, which starred Tony Jaa and featured stunt choreography by Rittikrai.
- Kessarin Ektawatkul is a former national taekwondo champion.
- Somluck Kamsing was a Muay Thai fighter and gold-medal winning boxer at the 1996 Summer Olympics.
- Piyapong Piew-on was a striker for the Thailand national football team and played professionally for FC Seoul in the K-League in the 1980s.
- Other sports represented include rugby, sepak takraw, soccer, gymnastics and Muay Thai (by a young female National Muay Thai Junior Champion and an elderly man).

== Reception ==
Born to Fight has received mixed reviews outside of Thailand.

Beyond Hollywood gave the film a positive review, calling it "90-odd minutes of random over-the-top action shot to a throbbing techno soundtrack. It’s not Ong Bak, although it does come dangerously close to being that other movie’s bastard love child." Scott Weinberg of DVD Talk gave the film four out of five stars, saying, "So it's a little quaint and corny when compared to the American action flicks, but it's also got a whole lot of energy, more than enough action, and some truly staggering stunt work. Fun, crazy stuff all the way."

On the negative side, Anton Bitel of Eye for Film gave the film two out of five stars, commenting that "it repeats the more irksome flaws of Ong-Bak, offering a naive brand of nationalism, somewhere on the border between the annoyingly cloying, the unintentionally hilarious and the downright xenophobic." John A. Nesbit of Old School Reviews gave the film a D+, calling it "little more than Thai flavored Michael Bay pyrotechnics on steroids in perpetual action sequences that appear ripped off from video games."
