= The Gangster (2012 film) =

2012 Thai film by Kongkiat Khomsiri

- Theatrical release poster
- Thai: อันธพาล
- Directed by: Kongkiat Khomsiri
- Written by: Kongkiat Khomsiri
- Produced by: Somsak Techaratanaprasert
- Starring: Krissada Sukosol Clapp; Pornchai Hongrattanaporn; Somchai Kemglad; Sakarin Suthamsamai; Krisada Supapprom; Nantharat Chaowarat; Pakchanok Wo-Onsri; Wasu Sangsingkaew; Boonsong Nakphoo
- Cinematography: Sayombhu Mukdeeprom
- Edited by: Kongkiat Khomsiri; Quanchi Ridhiwanna
- Music by: Kanisorn Studio
- Production company: Sahamongkol Film International
- Distributed by: Sahamongkol Film International; Baa-Ram-Ewe Co., Ltd.
- Release dates: June 12, 2012 (premiere at Paragon Cineplex); June 14, 2012 (nationwide)
- Running time: 114 minutes
- Country: Thailand
- Language: Thai
- Budget: ฿10-20 million
- Box office: ฿27.1 million

The Gangster (Thai: อันธพาล, romanized: Anthaphan) is a 2012 Thai epic crime drama film directed and written by Kongkiat Khomsiri, starring Krissada Sukosol Clapp, Pornchai Hongrattanaporn, Somchai Kemglad, Sakarin Suthamsamai, Krisada Supapprom, Nantharat Chaowarat, Pakchanok Wo-Onsri, Wasu Sangsingkaew, and Boonsong Nakphoo and distributed by Sahamongkol Film International

== Synopsis ==
Bangkok in the 1950s, from Salak Hin lane in Hua Lamphong neighborhood to the seven-storey building in Yaowarat and Wongwian Yi Sip Song Karakadakhom (July 22 Circle), they were under the gang of Thai Chinese mafia called "Four Kings".

Jod and Dang are the young men who goodfriend each other. Especially Dang is a leader and he is very respected among teenagers. They are in a gang by elder members as bosses, but one day Dang also suffered from a fatal car accident. After the coup (1957 coup by Sarit Thanarat) the new government has a policy to get rid of the gangs. As a result, these gang mafia scattered and Jod to fights with who are his former friends and his boss.

== Cast ==
- Krissada Sukosol Clapp as Jod/ Jod Howdy
- Somchai Kemglad as Dang/ Dang Bireley
- Sakarin Suthamsamai as Thong
- Krisada Supapprom as Piak
- Nantharat Chaowarat as Ploy
- Pakchanok Wo-Onsri as Oow Tee
- Pornchai Hongrattanaporn as Hia Lor (Elder brother Lor)
- Boonsong Nakphoo as Na Hum (Uncle Hum)
- Wasu Sangsingkaew as Phu Khan Kham Neung (Commander Kham Neung)
- Preecha Ketkham as Kamnan Tong (Headman Tong)
- Pongpat Wachirabunjong as Hia Seng/ Seng Pangtor (Elder brother Seng) (guest)
- Sonthaya Chitmanee as Serd (cameo)

== Production ==
The Gangster uses as its backdrop Thailand of the 1950s and 1960s, much like Nonzee Nimibutr's Dang Bireley's and Young Gangsters, which released in 1997 and very successful. Some characters from Dang Bireley's and Young Gangsters also have a role in this film, such as Dang Bireley and Pu Raberd Khuad (Pu The Bottle Bomb). In the press release launch, Jesdaporn Pholdee, who portrayed Dang Bireley in the 1997 film, was also featured in the event.
