= Suwinit Panjamawat =

Thai actor

- สุวินิต ปัญจมะวัต
- Born: November 21, 1984 (age 41); Lopburi, Thailand
- Education: Dhurakij Pundit University
- Occupation: Actor
- Years active: 2000–present
- Known for: Tears of the Black Tiger (2000); Jan Dara (2001)

Suwinit Panchamawat (Thai: สุวินิต ปัญจมะวัต, born 21 November 1984) nicknamed Num (Thai: หนุ่ม is a Thai actor. He is known for being young Dum Dua in Tears of the Black Tiger. In 2001, He got an award for the best male actor in Bangkok Critics Assembly Awards and the Suphannahong National Film Awards.

== Biography ==
Suwinit Panchamawat was born on November 21, 1984. He studied highschool at Surasakmontree School, and then studied his university years at Dhurakij Pundit University, graduated with a degree in broadcasting.

In 1991, Suwinit started his acitng career when he portrayed as Tonkla in Kling Wai Kon Por Sorn Wai. when he made his portrayal as young Dum Dua, in Tears of the Black Tiger by Wisit Sasanatieng. In 2001, he starred as the main character Jan Dara in Jan Dara by Nonzee Nimibutr. In 2002, he starred in one of the segments of the film Three. Suwinit also potrayed as Prince Pattanadid in the Japanese drama Spring Snow by Isao Yukisada, and as Ramong in an action film called Queens of Langkasuka In 2008.

Suwinit was featured in one of Thailand's magazines Hamburger as one of the important actors in Thailand every anniversary of the magazines industry.

In 2022, he became a host for Museum Detective, which was created by the Thai Public Broadcasting Service. The show lasted 13 episodes from 14 July to 6 October 2022.

== Personal life ==
Suwinit later walk out from the entertainment industry and work as a health therapist and opened a private clinic. He is the younger brother of Sunisa Panjamawat, an actor and singer. Sunisa is the person that lead him to potrayed as Tonkla in Kling Wai Kon Por Sorn Wai.

=== Filmography ===
Year	Title	Role
1991	Kling Wai Kon Por Sorn Wai	Tonkla
2000	Tears of the Black Tiger	Dum Dua
2001	Jan Dara	Jan Dara
2002	Three	Gaan
2005	Spring Snow	Prince Pattanadid
2008	Queens of Langkasuka	Ramong
2022	Museum Detective	Himself
