= Win Lyovarin =

Thai writer

- วินทร์ เลียววาริณ
- Born: Somchai Lyowarin (Thai: สมชัย เลี้ยววาริณ); 23 March 1956 (age 70); Hat Yai, Songkhla, Thailand
- Occupations: Novelist; short story writer; columnist
- Spouse: Lilian Lyovarin
- Writing career
- Genres: Criticism; suspense
- Notable works: Pracha Thippatai Bon Sen Khanan (Democracy, Shaken and Stirred)
- Website: Official website

Win Lyovarin (Thai: วินทร์ เลียววาริณ, RTGS: Win Liaowarin, birth name: Somchai Lyowarin, Thai: สมชัย เลี้ยววาริณ, born 23 March 1956) is a Thai writer. He is a two-time winner of the S.E.A. Write Award.

His novels and short stories have been hailed in Thailand for being provocative and encouraging young readers to develop critical thinking skills.

== Personal life ==
Win was born in Hat Yai District, Songkhla Province, Thailand. His father was a Chinese immigrant who settled in Hat Yai and earned his living as a shopkeeper. Win has a son named Trin who is currently a doctor in Singapore.

Win graduated a bachelor's degree in architecture from Chulalongkorn University. He worked as an architect in Singapore for 4 years before moving to New York to work and study. When he came back to Thailand, he started a career in advertising as an art director and pursued a master's degree in marketing from Thammasat University. He began writing during this time.

His experience in architecture and advertising heavily influenced some of his more experimental works. His experimental short stories usually contains both image and short text, both providing equally important context to the story.

== Awards ==
=== S.E.A. Write Award ===
- S.E.A. Write Award in 1997, for the novel Pracha Thippatai Bon Sen Khanan (translated in 2003 as Democracy, Shaken and Stirred)
- S.E.A. Write Award in 1999, for the short story collection Sing Mi Chiwit Thi Riak Wa Khon ("the creatures called humans")

=== National Book Improvement Committee ===
- Outstanding Book Award in 1995, for Aphet Kamsuan
- Outstanding Book Award in 1995, for Pracha Thippatai Bon Sen Khanan
- Honorable Mention in 1995, for Samut Pok Dam Kap Baimai Si Daeng
- Outstanding Book Award in 2003, for Pik Daeng

=== Thailand Research Fund ===
- One of 88 Good Science Books in 2001, for Duean Chuang Duang Den Fa Da Dao
- One of 100 Good Books That Children and Young Adults Should Read, for Sing Mi Chiwit Thi Riak Wa Khon

=== Silpathorn Award ===
Win received the Silpathorn Award for Literature in 2006, awarded annually by the Thailand Ministry of Culture Office of Contemporary Art and Culture to living contemporary artists in the fields of literature, music, filmmaking, visual arts, and performing arts.

== Works ==
=== Novels ===
- Pracha Thippatai Bon Sen Khanaan (ประชาธิปไตยบนเส้นขนาน; 1994) ISBN 978-974-85854-7-5
  - Published in English in 2003 as Democracy, Shaken and Stirred ISBN 978-974-91296-9-2. A review by Ron Morris states that the Thai title of the book translates as "Democracy Along Parallel Lines". Winbookclub product details
- Pik Daeng (ปีกแดง; novel; 2002) ISBN 978-974-87924-7-7
- Phu Chai Khon Thi Tam Rak Thoe Thuk Chat Phim Khrang Thi Paet Sip Ha (ผู้ชายคนที่ตามรักเธอทุกชาติ พิมพ์ครั้งที่ 85; 2006) ISBN 978-974-93277-4-6
- Lok Bai Thi Song Khong Mo (โลกใบที่สองของโม; 2006) ISBN 974-92394-8-2
- Fon Tok Khuen Fa (ฝนตกขึ้นฟ้า; 2007) ISBN 974-88214-4-7
- Khattakam Chak Rasi (ฆาตกรรมจักรราศี; 2008; book three in the Siao Nak Suep เสี่ยวนักสืบ series)
- Bunga Pari (บุหงาปารี; 2008; adapted from the screenplay Queens of Langasuka)

=== Collected short stories and articles ===
- Samut Pok Dam Kap Baimai Si Daeng (สมุดปกดำกับใบไม้สีแดง; 1994) ISBN 978-974-90404-7-8
- Aphet Kamsuan (อาเพศกำสรวล; 1994) ISBN 978-974-90404-8-5
- Duean Chuang Duang Den Fa Da Dao (เดือนช่วงดวงเด่นฟ้าดาดาว; 1995) ISBN 978-974-90127-6-5
- Sing Mi Chiwit Thi Riak Wa Khon (สิ่งมีชีวิตที่เรียกว่าคน; 1999) ISBN 978-974-85855-0-5
- Nueng Wan Diao Kan (หนึ่งวันเดียวกัน; 2001) ISBN 978-974-90048-3-8
  - Published in English in 2005 as A Day in the Life ISBN 978-974-91872-5-8
- Lang An Buri (หลังอานบุรี; 2001) ISBN 978-974-90048-2-1
- Pan Nam Pen Tua (ปั้นน้ำเป็นตัว; 2003) ISBN 978-974-90879-4-7
- Am ( ำ; 2003) ISBN 978-974-91297-0-8
- Wan Raek Khong Wan Thi Luea (วันแรกของวันที่เหลือ; 2004) ISBN 978-974-91863-6-7
- Khatakam Klang Thale (ฆาตกรรมกลางทะเล; 2004; book one in the Siao Nak Suep เสี่ยวนักสืบ series); ISBN 978-974-91876-6-1
- Pla Thi Wai Nai Sanam Futbon (ปลาที่ว่ายในสนามฟุตบอล; 2005) ISBN 978-974-91872-4-1
- Niyai Khang Cho (นิยายข้างจอ; 2005) ISBN 978-974-92738-7-6
- Charun Charat Ratsami Phrao Phrang Phroi (จรูญจรัสรัศมีพราว พร่างพร้อย; 2005) ISBN 978-974-93375-7-8
- Roi Thao Lek Lek Khong Rao Eng (รอยเท้าเล็กๆของเราเอง; 2005) ISBN 978-974-93277-5-3
- Khadi Phii Nang Takhian (คดีผีนางตะเคียน 2006; book two in the Siao Nak Suep เสี่ยวนักสืบ series) ISBN 978-974-94437-6-7
- Lok Dan Thi Han Lang Hai Duang Athit (โลกด้านที่หันหลังให้ดวงอาทิตย์; 2006) ISBN 978-974-93957-7-6
- Khwam Fan Ngo Ngo (ความฝันโง่ ๆ; 2006) ISBN 974-94624-3-2
- Ya Kae Samong Phuk Tra Khwai Bin (ยาแก้สมองผูก ตราควายบิน; 2007) ISBN 974-88226-9-9
- Nam Khaeng Unit Tra Khwai Bin (น้ำแข็งยูนิต ตราควายบิน; 2007) ISBN 978-974-8232-75-1
- Bueang Bon Yang Mi Saeng Dao (เบื้องบนยังมีแสงดาว; 2007) ISBN 974-7476-29-0
- Bang Kaphong (บางกะโพ้ง; 2007) ISBN 974-8480-24-0
- Athit Khuen Thang Thit Tawan Tok (อาทิตย์ขึ้นทางทิศตะวันตก; 2008)
- Doen Pai Hai Sut Fan (เดินไปให้สุดฝัน; 2008)
- Sen Rob Wong Kong Nueng Wan (เส้นรอบวงของหนึ่งวัน; 2009) ISBN 978-974-642-081-5

==== With Prabda Yoon ====
- Khwam Na Cha Pen Bon Sen Khanan (ความน่าจะเป็นบนเส้นขนาน; 2002) ISBN 978-974-90723-5-6
- Khwam Na Cha Pen Bon Sen Khanan 2 (ความน่าจะเป็นบนเส้นขนาน 2; 2004) ISBN 978-974-92032-5-5
- Khwam Na Cha Pen Bon Sen Khanan 3 (ความน่าจะเป็นบนเส้นขนาน 3; 2005) ISBN 978-974-92863-7-1
- Khwam Na Cha Pen Bon Sen Khanan 4 (ความน่าจะเป็นบนเส้นขนาน 4; 2006) ISBN 978-974-94148-3-5
- Khwam Na Cha Pen Bon Sen Khanan 5 (ความน่าจะเป็นบนเส้นขนาน 5; 2007) ISBN 978-974-8233-08-6

==== Screenplays ====
- Queens of Langkasuka (2008, with Nonzee Nimibutr)
