= Bangkok Dangerous =

Bangkok Dangerous may refer to:

- Bangkok Dangerous (1999 film), Thai crime drama directed by the Pang Brothers
- Bangkok Dangerous (2008 film), American remake of the 1999 film, also directed by the Pang Brothers
