= Patharawarin Timkul =

Thai actress and model

- ภัทรวรินทร์ ทิมกุล
- Born: 8 December 1977 (age 48)
- Other name: May (เมย์)
- Occupations: Actress; singer; writer; model; business; chef

Patharawarin Timkul (Thai: ภัทรวรินทร์ ทิมกุล, RTGS: Phattharawarin Thimkun; born March 1, 1977) is a Thai actress and model. Her films include Bangkok Dangerous and Jan Dara. She is the daughter of leading Thai dance theater figure and National Artist, Performing Arts branch Patravadi Mejudhon. Her nickname is May.

== Biography ==
Patharawarin was trained as a ballerina and dancer as a child, and first found work as a model and acting in television commercials. She has appeared as the cover girl on a number of Thai magazines, and has found steady work in the Thai film industry since her first feature-film role in Bangkok Dangerous (1999), the debut film from the Pang Brothers. She co-starred as Aom, a worker in a go-go bar and contact for the protagonist gunman. She has appeared in mostly crime films and in films where she plays a vixen. Another of her well-known roles was as Khun Kaew in Nonzee Nimibutr's erotic drama, Jan Dara.

She has also on occasion appeared in performances at her mother's open air theater, the Patravadi Theatre, located in Bangkok Yai.

In 2005, May represented Thailand as an ambassador to the World Youth Peace Summit.

Alternate English spellings of her name include Patarvarin Timkul, Patarawarin Timkul, Pataravarin Timkul or Patawarin Timkul.

== Filmography ==
Year	Title	Role
1999	Bangkok Dangerous	Aom
2001	Jan Dara	Wilai Wissanan / Kaew
2002	Butterfly in Grey	Malee
2004	Yah Nark	
2007	Body	Dararai
2009	The Sanctuary (2009 film)	Selina
2013	Make Me Shudder	Pannee
2014	Dangerous Boys	Peng's mother
2020	Please (Her)	Bew's mother

=== Television series ===
Year	Title	Role
1993	Sot Han Song	Ravi
1995	Yaowarat Nai Payu Fon	Hong
1997	Sao Chai Hi-Tech	Niya
1998	Thep Niyai Nai Sanor	Boom
1999	Kijagum Chai Sod	Suratsawadee
2000	Hong Neu Mangkorn	Soi
2000	Thippiya Duriang	Niralai / Li Hong Hua
2001	Kor Yood Hua Jai Wai Piang Ther	Chaiya
2004	Mang Korn Daew Dai	Rujee / Soi
2013	Hormones: The Series	Teacher Aoh
2014	Sunshine, My Friend	On (Oranee's mother)
2016	Club Friday Season 7: The Fault of Love	Pin
2016	Pitsawat	Lady Arunchai Alongkornsakun
2016	Bangkok Bachelors	May
2021	Girl From Nowhere	Teacher A (Episode: Liberation)
2021	Mae Bia	Rungthip
2021	The Player	Thitapa (Giwi's mother)
2024	Mom's Recipe	Orrasa (Ep. 8)
2024	Laplae the Hidden Town	Angkab
