= Jan Dara (2001 film) =

2001 Thai film by Nonzee Nimibutr

- The Thai VCD cover.
- Directed by: Nonzee Nimibutr
- Written by: Nonzee Nimibutr; Sirapak Paoboonkerd; Utsana Phloengtham
- Produced by: Peter Chan; Jo Jo Yuet-chun Hui; Duangkamol Limcharoen; Nonzee Nimibutr
- Starring: Suwinit Panjamawat; Christy Chung; Eakarat Sarsukh; Wipawee Charoenpura; Patharawarin Timkul
- Cinematography: Nattawut Kittikhun
- Edited by: Sunij Asavinikul
- Music by: Chartchai Pongprapapan; Pakawat Waiwitaya
- Production companies: Applause Pictures; Cinemasia
- Distributed by: Tai Entertainment
- Release dates: September 12, 2001 (Canada); September 28, 2001 (Thailand)
- Running time: 113 min.
- Country: Thailand
- Language: Thai

Jan Dara (Thai: จัน ดารา) is a 2001 Thai erotic-period-drama film directed and co-written by Nonzee Nimibutr and co-starring Hong Kong cinema actress Christy Chung. It is based on a novel by Utsana Phloengtham and follows the titular character as he attempts to break free from the cycle of sex and abuse perpetuated in his wealthy household while fulfilling his own pleasures and desires. The film premiered at the 2001 Toronto International Film Festival. In Thailand, the film was controversial because its sex scenes tested the censorship bounds of the 1930 Film Act.

== Plot ==
Jan Dara is a boy growing up in 1930s Siam in a wealthy, dysfunctional family where sex has a huge impact on everyone's lives. Jan is viewed by his father, Khun Luang, as cursed, since his mother died giving birth to him, and he is relegated to doing servant work in the house as a result. The younger sister of Jan's mother, Aunt Waad, is brought in to care for Jan. The sex-addicted Luang has sex with many women in his household, including Waad, whom Jan is constantly exposed to. Jan becomes jealous since he has developed feelings for his aunt.

Waad and Luang have a daughter, Kaew. Luang spoils Kaew and raises her to despise her own brother. Waad, meanwhile, resents her daughter's rotten personality and affectionately treats Jan as her own son instead. The teenage Jan befriends Khen, the son of the family cook, who has begun a secret relationship with Kaew's nanny Saisoi. Khen introduces him to sex by making him lose his virginity to Saisoi. He also falls in love with and pursues Hyacinth, a student he encounters and later escorts to her home daily after she finishes school.

Luang's longtime mistress, the sophisticated nymphomaniac Boonlueang, moves into a guesthouse on the estate. She is surprisingly compassionate to Jan, and she and Jan eventually begin a sexual relationship. However, his affair makes him hesitant to pursue a relationship with Hyacinth and he writes her a farewell letter. A teenaged Kaew, who had become attracted to Saisoi, begins resenting Khen and Saisoi after discovering their relationship; she later accuses Jan of rape when he catches her seducing Khen to set him up as revenge for pursuing Saisoi. Knowing her daughter's deceitful nature, Waad defends Jan, but Luang ultimately banishes Jan and Khen. Jan willingly leaves the house, having finally decided to stand up against his own father. As he packs his things to leave, Waad reveals to him that he was conceived after his mother was gang raped by Waad's then-boyfriend and his friends, making it impossible to know who is his biological father.

After years away from Bangkok investigating about his real father, the adult Jan is brought back to the family estate. Kaew has become pregnant and Jan is forced into a loveless arranged marriage with his sister so that the damage to the family's reputation is smoothed over. Jan agrees to the marriage as long as he is promised the deed to the estate. He also deduces that Luang is the father of Kaew's child, having forced his daughter to have sex with him when she became an adult, and he uses this to finally gain power over Luang and Kaew in exchange for maintaining the secret. Jan rekindles his affair with Boonlueang. Jan learns that Hyacinth has died due to typhoid fever during his time away from Bangkok.

During his wedding to Kaew, Jan impulsively has sex with one of the family's maids in front of the portrait of his mother, with him coming to terms with the fact that he has repeated Luang's promiscuous and abusive ways. Kaew gives birth to her father's child, who has down syndrome. She curses the baby, which leads to his name "Pree." Luang, already crippled from old age and impotent after feeling guilty about getting his daughter pregnant, witnesses Jan have sex with Boonlueang and falls into a catatonic state. After helping Jan raise Pree and seeing that the house has settled, Waad leaves the family to become a nun. Jan discovers Kaew is also having a longtime secret affair with Boonlueang, and he agrees to his wife's proposal to share her. In exchange, he demands that Kaew give him a child since his true love, Hyacinth, has died. He repeatedly rapes his wife, despite her only being attracted to women. When Kaew becomes pregnant with Jan's child, she has the baby aborted instead to his and Boonlueang's horror.

Feeling guilty for tormenting Kaew, Jan eventually becomes impotent as well and could not be aroused with anyone anymore, even with Boonlueang. Kaew continues to maintain a certain authority in the premises, while Luang remains catatonic even when his son/grandson Pree tries to play with him. As Jan looks over as the ruler of the household, he once again ponders his true father.

== Cast ==
- Suwinit Panjamawat as Jan Dara, the protagonist and stepson of Khun Luang, as well as Aunt Waad's nephew and Kaew's stepbrother and later husband
  - Eakarat Sarsukh as adult Jan Dara
- Christy Chung as Khun Boonlueang, Luang's longtime mistress who begins affairs with Jan and Kaew
- Wipawee Charoenpura as Aunt Waad, Jan's compassionate aunt who becomes his maternal figure, as well as Kaew's mother
- Patharawarin Timkul as Kaew, Jan's manipulative stepsister, biological cousin and later wife, as well as the daughter of Luang and Waad
- Santisuk Promsiri as Khun Luang, Jan's abusive and sex-addicted stepfather and patriarch of the household, as well as the father of both Kaew and Kaew's son Pree
- Sasithorn Panichnok as Hyacinth, a student who Jan sees as his true love
- Kanchit Thamthong as Khen Krathingthong, the sex-crazed son of the cook of Jan's family who becomes Saisoi's partner
- Sukanya Kongkawong as Saisoi, Kaew's longtime nanny since childhood and Khen's partner who unintentionally sparks Kaew's sexual awakening

== Production ==
Christy Chung said it was a 'great, new experience' to work with the shy 17-year-old Thai actor, Suwinit Panjamawat. He was so embarrassed during their sex scenes, she claims, that he had to wear a jock strap. Chung says this garment hurt her considerably on the set, explaining rather graphically how the grinding of its fabric against her skin caused friction burns during the more frenetic moments of simulated passion."

== Awards ==
- 2001 Thailand National Film Association Awards: Best art direction (for Ek Iemchuen); best cinematography (for Nattawut Kittikhun). Also nominated for best screenplay and best sound.

== Film festivals ==
In addition to its premiere at the 2001 Toronto International Film Festival, Jan Dara has also screened at the Vancouver International Film Festival, London Film Festival, Pusan International Film Festival, International Film Festival Rotterdam and the San Francisco International Asian American Film Festival.

== DVD release ==
The DVD, with English subtitles, has been issued by Kino International (Region 1) and in Thailand by APS (Region 3).
