= Three (2002 film) =

2002 film by Kim Jee-woon, Nonzee Nimibutr and Peter Chan

- Three (Going Home)'s movie poster
- Directed by: Kim Jee-woon; Nonzee Nimibutr; Peter Ho-Sun Chan
- Written by: Jojo Hui; Kim Jee-woon; Nitas Singhamat
- Produced by: Duangamol Limcharoen; Jojo Hui; Nonzee Nimibutr; Oh Jung-Won; Peter Ho-Sun Chan
- Cinematography: Hong Kyung-pyo; Nattawut Kittikhun; Christopher Doyle
- Edited by: Nonzee Nimibutr; Chung Yoon-Chul; Kong Chi-leung
- Music by: Cho Sung-Woo; Sinnapa Sarasas; Peter Kam; Lee Byung-woo; Apisit Wongchoti
- Production companies: CJ Entertainment; Sahamongkol Film International; Applause Pictures
- Release date: July 12, 2002
- Running time: 129 minutes
- Countries: South Korea; Thailand; Hong Kong
- Languages: Korean; Thai; Cantonese; Mandarin
- Box office: $1,683,621

Three (Korean: 쓰리; RR: Sseuri, Thai: อารมณ์ อาถรรพณ์ อาฆาต, Chinese: 三更; pinyin: Sāngēng) is a 2002 horror anthology film consisting of three segments by directors from three Southeast Asian and East Asian countries.

The segments are, in order: Memories, directed by Kim Jee-woon (South Korea), The Wheel, directed by Nonzee Nimibutr (Thailand), and Going Home, directed by Peter Chan (Hong Kong).

A sequel by different directors following the same concept, Three... Extremes, was released in 2004; it did not feature a Thai director, but a Japanese director instead. Although Three was not originally released in the United States, the success of its sequel led to the original's release under the title Three... Extremes II.

== Memories ==
Directed and screenplay by Kim Jee-woon
Cinematography by Hong Kyung-pyo

A man goes to a psychiatrist to try to remember what happened the day his wife disappeared from his life. Meanwhile, his wife wakes up and finds herself lying on a deserted road, having no idea how she got there in the first place. Slowly, she recollects the memories of her previous life and takes a lead towards her and her husband's residence, a flat located in an empty housing estate called "New Town". Strange things befall the couple: the husband experiences nightmares of his ghastly wife mutilating herself, while the wife feels as if others do not acknowledge her existence. When she finally arrives at her residence, she discovers the full truth.

The man had murdered his wife after an argument and cut her into pieces. Her remains are then stored in a black bag seen at certain points in the movie. The man experiences trauma after the incident, while the reason why others ignore the wife is because no one can see her. The man is then seen driving away from New Town with his wife's remains.

=== Cast ===
- Jeong Bo-seok - Husband
- Kim Hye-soo - Wife
- Choi Jeong-won - Doctor
- Jang Jung-won - Eun-Ji
- Jee Sung-keun - Taxi driver
- Moon Jeong-hee - Hyun-joo, the sister of the wife
- Park Hee-soon - Hyun-joo's husband

== The Wheel ==
Directed by Nonzee Nimibutr
Story by: Ek Iemchuen and Nonzee Nimibutr
Screenplay by Nitas Singhamat
Cinematography by Nattawut Kittikhun

A puppet master (known as Hun lakhon lek) named Master Tao lies dying in his bed after he has drowned his wife and son. Tao fears a curse coming from his puppets, which will exact their improper owners misery should they take hold of them. He is later burned alive inside his house with the spirits of his wife and son becoming witnesses. His rival, Master Tong, a tutor for traditional Thai dance connected to Hun lakhon lek (known as Khon) attempts to steal the puppets to raise his prestige. However, this causes the deaths of many people in the troupe. Tong eventually meets the same fate as Tao when the house he is in catches fire and burns down.

=== Cast ===
- Suwinit Panjamawat - Gaan
- Kanyavae Chatiawaipreacha - Nuan
- Pornchai Chuvanon - Plew
- Anusak Intasorn - Im
- Pattama Jangjarut - Nan
- Savika Kanchanamas - Sa-Ing
- Manop Meejamarat - Cht
- Tinnapob Seeweesriruth - Dang
- Vinn Vasinanon - Bua
- Pongsanart Vinsiri - Master Tong
- Komgrich Yuttiyong - Master Tao

== Going Home ==
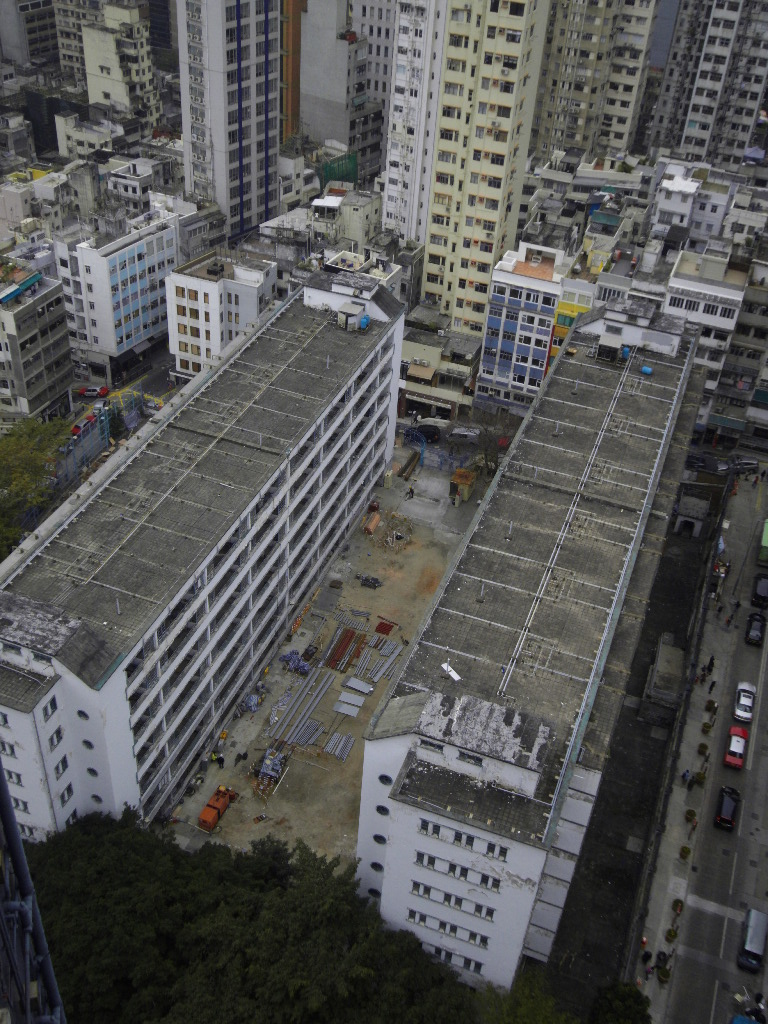
Hollywood Road Police R & F Married Quarters, where the segment Going Home was shot.

Directed by Peter Chan
Story by Teddy Chan and Su Chao-Bin
Screenplay by Matt Chow and Jo Jo Hui Yuet-chun
Cinematography by Christopher Doyle
Filming location: Former Police Married Quarters on Hollywood Road, Sheung Wan, Hong Kong

A widowed cop, Chan Kwok-wai moves to a dying apartment with his son, Cheung. He is informed about Yu, a neighbor across the complex, who lives with his paralyzed wife, Hai'er, and daughter. Yu's daughter creeps Cheung, but the two become friends and later play at a photo studio. However, Chan mistakenly believes that Yu has kidnapped Cheung and attempts to break into his apartment, only to get caught and rendered unconscious. Yu takes Chan hostage and reveals that his wife has died, yet he continues to talk to her as if she is alive. He promises to release him in three days, the time when his wife would "wake up" through the help of Chinese medicine, after which the two would go back to their Changsha home in the mainland. He also reveals that he never has a daughter, for she was aborted when his wife succumbed to liver cancer three years before.

On the third day, Chan's fellow cops manage to arrest Yu. However, before he is taken away, he escapes and attempts to reach Hai'er, only to get killed when a car hits him. The doctor who treated Yu and Hai'er tell Chan the full truth about her patients as well as the fact that though Hai'er has died, she does indeed shows signs of life. The film ends with Cheung leaving the photo studio, which is shown to be closed from the outside but thriving in the inside, implying that it is otherworldly. Yu, Hai'er, and their daughter enter the studio to get their photos taken.

=== Cast ===
- Leon Lai - Yu
- Eric Tsang - Chan Kwok-wai
- Eugenia Yuan - Hai'er, Yu's wife
- Li Ting-Fung - Cheung
- Lau Tsz-Wing - Yu's Daughter
- Camy Ting - Pathologist
- Ting Tak-Ming - Janitor
- Wong Heng - Doctor
- John Shum - Photographer

== Release ==
Three was first released in theaters on July 12, 2002. In the Philippines, the film was released by Solar Entertainment on October 13, 2004.

The film was released in the United States under the title Three Extremes II, as the sequel was released first in U.S. territories, followed by this film.

== Accolades ==
The third segment of the film, Going Home, has won:

- 2002 Golden Horse Film Festival:
  - Best Actor: Leon Lai
  - Best Cinematography: Christopher Doyle
- 2003 Hong Kong Film Awards:
  - Best New Performer: Eugenia Yuan
