= Queens of Langkasuka =

- The Thai theatrical poster.
- Directed by: Nonzee Nimibutr
- Written by: Win Lyovarin
- Produced by: Nonzee Nimibutr
- Starring: Jarunee Suksawat; Ananda Everingham; Jesdaporn Pholdee; Dan Chupong; Sorapong Chatree
- Cinematography: Natthakit Preechacharoenwat
- Edited by: Nonzee Nimibutr; Panutat Wisetwong; Likhit Waratgool
- Music by: Chatchai Pongprapaphan
- Distributed by: Sahamongkol Film International
- Release date: 23 October 2008
- Running time: 133 minutes
- Country: Thailand
- Language: Thai
- Budget: 140 million baht

Queens of Langkasuka (Thai: ปืนใหญ่จอมสลัด; RTGS: Puen Yai Chom Salat) is a 2008 Thai historical fantasy adventure film directed by Nonzee Nimibutr and written by two-time S.E.A. Write Award winner Win Lyovarin.

Known as Pirates of Langkasuka in the UK, as Legend of Langkasuka in Australia and Canada, and as Legend of the Tsunami Warrior in the US.

== Plot ==
Queen Hijau (The Green Queen) of Pattani faces overthrow by the rebel Prince Rawai, who is allied with pirate captain Black Raven. The pirates attempt to capture a huge cannon built by Dutchman Janis Bree and Chinese inventor Lim Kiam, but the Dutch ship carrying the cannon blows up and the cannons sink into the sea.

Meanwhile, an orphaned sea gypsy boy named Pari (meaning "stingray") lies in a fishing village which is constantly under attack by Black Raven's raiding parties. The boy, gifted in the magical art of Dulum, is taken by his uncle Anyar to learn the magical ways of the ocean from White Ray. However, the sage refuses to teach the boy. Nevertheless, Pari is soon able to communicate with the marine life. He grows into manhood and fights against Black Raven's pirates.

Black Raven, who also a practitioner in the Dulum ocean magical arts, has been trying unsuccessfully to raise the huge cannon from the sea.

The local ruler, Queen Hijau, wants her own large cannon and seeks out Lim Kiam, whom she finds is living in the sea gypsy village. She sends away her sisters, Princess Biru (The Blue Princess) and Princess Ungu (The Purple Princess). They are under the protection of the queen's loyal commander, the fierce silat exponent Lord Yarang.

Yarang comes under attack at the village by Black Raven's. Pari helps fight off the pirates, and Yarang escapes. Princess Ungu was thought to have been killed, but she was rescued by Pari and taken to White Ray's remote island.

A romance develops between Ungu and Pari, but Ungu is intended to marry the Prince of Pahang, an important ally of Langkasuka. Pari himself is still tortured by memories of the death of his childhood sweetheart at the hands of Black Raven's men.

Pari encounters Black Ray, an evil, unstable alter ego of White Ray, and begins to learn more about Dulum and the conflict between the black and white sides of the magic.

Eventually, all the forces - the rebel prince, the pirates, the ocean sorcerers, the queen and the princesses - battle for the sunken cannon. During this battle, Black Raven uses a pair of whales to tow a raft with a heavy cannon into range of the castle walls. Pari - previously presumed to be dead - responds by rising from the ocean, standing on the back of a manta ray. He calls to the whales who slip their bonds and breach, landing on and destroying Black Raven's raft

== Cast ==
- Jarunee Suksawat as Queen Hijau
- Jacqueline Apithananon as Princess Biru
- Anna Ris as Princess Ungu
- Chupong Changprung as Lord Yarang
- Ananda Everingham as Pari
- Sorapong Chatree as White Ray/Black Ray
- Jesdaporn Pholdee as Abdul Ghafur Muhiuddin Shah of Pahang
- Winai Kraibutr as Black Raven
- Jakkrit Phanichphatikram as Lim Kium
- Andre Machielsen as Janis Bree
- Preecha Katkham as Anyar
- Kunanek Naiyanaprasert as Pari (youth)
- Suwinit Panjamawat as Yarang's second in command
- Manassanan Patcharasopachai
- Mesini Keawratri
- Ake Oree as Prince Rawai
- Thiti Micheli
- Attaporn Theemakorn
- Suppakorn Kitsuwan
- Arisa Sontirod
- Kamol Luangrojkul

== Reception ==
Queens of Langkasuka, which went into production in 2005, was at first called Queens of Pattani, but the name was changed to avoid political connections to the South Thailand insurgency and Pattani separatism, and to tie the story in with the legend of Langkasuka.

The film premiered at the 2008 Cannes Film Market to mixed reviews. Derek Elley of Variety said the film lacked focus and at 133 minutes was too long. Maggie Lee of The Hollywood Reporter was more upbeat, praising the sumptuous costume design and action sequences, but also said the film was too long.

Based on the reception from the industry press, studio Sahamongkol Film International pushed for a shorter version of the film. The film's August 2008 release in Thai cinemas was postponed until October, with the director citing Thailand's unstable political atmosphere.

A boost of confidence was given though, when the film was scheduled for the Venice Film Festival, where it would play in a special out-of-competition midnight screening. Queens of Langkasuka was also the "gala opening" film for the 2008 Bangkok International Film Festival.

== Derivative works ==
The screenplay for Queens of Langkasuka was adapted by Win Lyovarin into the novel Bunga Pari (Thai: บุหงาปารี), also released in 2008.
