= Jarunee Suksawat =

Thai actress

- จารุณี สุขสวัสดิ์
- Born: 12 February 1962 (age 64); Bangkok, Thailand
- Other names: Ple; Caroline Desneiges
- Education: Bachelor of Social Sciences, Suan Sunandha Rajabhat University, Thailand
- Occupations: Actress; model
- Years active: 1977–present
- Known for: Thai action films (1970s–1980s)

Jarunee Suksawat (Thai: จารุณี สุขสวัสดิ์, RTGS: Charuni Suksawat; born 23 February 1962), also known by her French name Caroline Desneiges, is a Thai actress and businesswoman. She has been referred as the "Action Queen of Thailand" and is best known for her numerous appearances in action films in the 1970s and 1980s.

== Early life and education ==
Suksawat was born to a Thai mother, Rabiab Suksawat, and a French father, Ferdinand Desneiges, who had abandoned her since she was a young age. Her grandmother helped raise Suksawat as a single mother in low-income housing. Suksawat attended Bang Kapi School, followed by a vocational course at Chao Phraya Commercial, and finally receiving a Bachelor's degree in Social Science from Suan Sunandha Rajabhat University and a Master's degree in Cosmetical Sciences from Mae Fah Luang University in Chiang Rai, Thailand.

== Career ==
=== Acting ===
Suksawat starred in hundreds of films and was known as the "action movie queen", although she had no training in martial arts. She began acting in films in 1977, first in Sawasdee Khun Kroo and then in Rak Laew Raw Noi with popular actor Sorapong Chatree. She was a protégé of director Promsin Sibunruang.

In 1980, she starred in the drama film Baan Sai Thong, directed by Ruj Ronnapop and later in the sequel Pojjaman Sawangwong, seen as a breakthrough role. Before that, she said she was typecast as a tomboy.

She left acting in the mid 1980s after being injured while filming, but occasionally returns to acting, including in the 2008 film Queens of Langkasuka directed by Nonzee Nimibutr, her first role in ten years. She had turned down a number of previous offers and found it difficult to return to filming.

=== Business ===
Suksawat runs an alternative health and beauty products company, Thaidham Alliance. She was on the steering committee of the 2011 conference of the International Federation of Societies of Cosmetic Chemists.

== Accolades ==
- Golden Star 1980
- Popular Vote
- Mekhala Queen of Thai Film 2014
