= Saksiri Meesomsueb =

Thai poet and writer (born 1957)

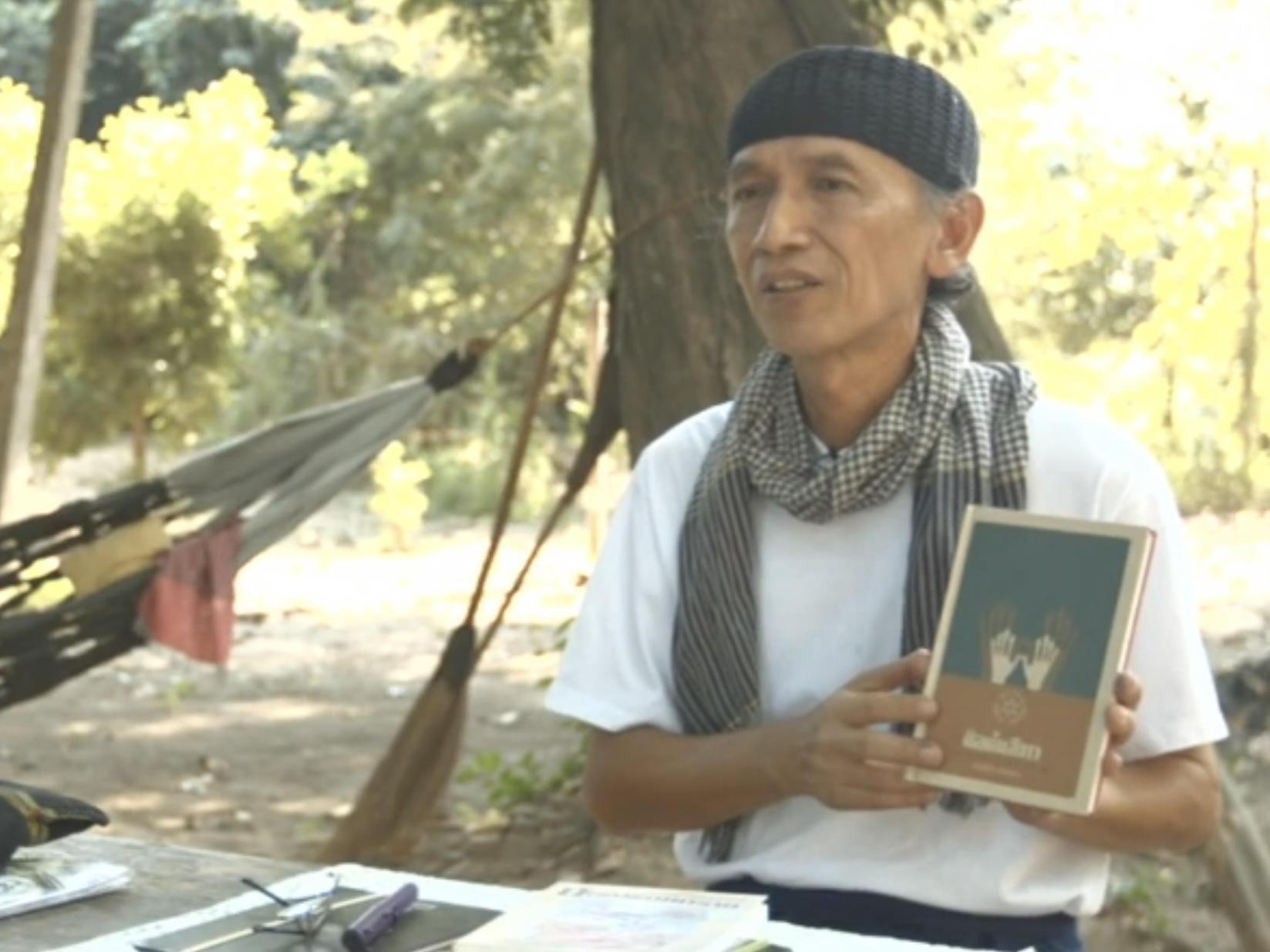
Meesomsueb in 2020

Saksiri Meesomsueb (Thai: ศักดิ์ศิริ มีสมสืบ; RTGS: Saksiri Misomsuep; born 23 August 1957 in Nakhon Sawan) is a Thai poet and writer. He is also known by the pen name Kittisak.

== Awards ==
Meesomsueb won the 1992 S.E.A. Write Award for his collection of poems, That Hand is White. In 2005, he was given the Silpathorn Award for Literature.
