= Elephant White =

2011 film by Prachya Pinkaew

- Theatrical release poster
- Directed by: Prachya Pinkaew
- Written by: Kevin Bernhardt
- Produced by: Humberto Arechiga; Daniel Bernhardt; Frank DeMartini; Djimon Hounsou; Sally Lear; Peter Safran; Tom Waller
- Starring: Djimon Hounsou; Kevin Bacon
- Cinematography: Wade Muller
- Edited by: David Richardson
- Music by: Robert Folk
- Production companies: Nu Image; Millennium Films
- Distributed by: Millennium Entertainment
- Release date: May 17, 2011
- Running time: 91 minutes
- Countries: Thailand; United States
- Languages: English; Thai
- Budget: $10 million

Elephant White is a 2011 American action-thriller film starring Djimon Hounsou and Kevin Bacon. Filming took place in Bangkok, Thailand.

== Plot ==
American assassin Curtie Church (Hounsou) is completing a job in Thailand when 14-year-old child prostitute, Mae, witnesses Church killing a group of her captors, the Chang Cao gang, and afterwards framing the Jong Ang Gang for the murders. Church collects his payment for the job from his client, Rajahdon, whose daughter was murdered. Church travels to his hideout near a monastery and within sight of Kitty Kat, a Jong Ang Gang club. While Church is eating, Mae arrives. After interrogating her, he ties her up and gags her. Church has strange dreams of Mae, then awakes in the monastery. He leaves immediately and kills the snipers watching the club of his weapons dealer, Jimmy (Bacon), taking one of their cellphones. Church arranges a meeting with Rajahdon, but hides outside until Rajahdon leaves. Church follows him back to a brothel and pays for a room. After entering the room, he asks the girl if Rajahdon is the boss and where he is. He sees Mae riding a white elephant toward him and wakes up at his hideout. He tells Mae his business is finished in Bangkok. Church then wakes up and it is revealed the previous fight sequence was all just a dream.

Boss Katha and Advisor Bhun discuss how to find Church when Rajahdon walks in. It is then revealed that Rajahdon is Katha's son. The planned assassination of Bhun and the gang war was secretly intended by Rajhadoon as a means for him to succeed his father as his father deems him to be unfit to lead the gang and he chooses Bhun as the successor instead. With Bhun out of the way, Rajhadon would kill Church and win himself back into his fathers good graces. Rajahdon says he will take care of Church himself. Church calls Jimmy to tell him he's leaving, but wants Jimmy to take care of Mae. Jimmy tells Rajahdon that Church is leaving, but Rajahdon still wants to kill Church to assure his position as successor to Boss Katha. Church drives to the gang headquarters and crashes through the wall into the room where Boss Katha and Advisor Bhun are. Church holds Katha hostage while Jimmy and Rajahdon arrive. Church offers to buy all the girls to free them and he begins to tell Katha about the bounty Rajahdon placed on Bhun and whole scheme concocted by Rajadon to succeed as gang leader. Rajahdon tries to shoot him, but Jimmy kills Rajahdon first. The guards then shoot Jimmy but he survived. Disappointed at his son's recklessness, Katha accepts Church's offers to buy the all the girls he has. Church takes a picture of Mae off the wall and Katha says she was the first girl he brought in but she died thirty years ago. Church is confused but soon realizing that he has been talking with Mae's spirit all along who wants him to rescue all the enslaved girls. Jimmy and Church leave with the girls, but Church tells Jimmy he has to go back. Jimmy says he will make sure the girls get help.

== Cast ==
- Djimon Hounsou as Curtis "Curtie" Church
- Kevin Bacon as Jimmy "The Brit"
- Jirantanin Pitakporntrakul as Mae
- Weeraprawat Wongpuapan as Boss Katha
- Abhijati "Meuk" Jusakul as Advisor Bhun
- Sahajak Boonthanakit as Rajahdon
- Creighton Mark Johnson as Lead Gunman Bodyguard (uncredited)
- Ron Smoorenburg as Bodyguard (uncredited)
- Desmond O'Neill as Bodyguard (uncredited)

== Marketing ==
At the beginning of the film, in a shot showcasing Bangkok is a billboard advertising The Expendables, which was also made by Nu Image/Millennium Films the previous year.

== Home media ==
The film was released on Blu-ray Disc and DVD on May 17, 2011.
