= Tawan Tud Burapha =

- Also known as: The Brothers
- Genre: Action; Drama; Gangster; Heroic bloodshed
- Written by: Niphon Phewnen & Prayote Suksricharoensuk (concept stories); Na Phut Susri & Kongkiat Khomsiri (screenwriters)
- Directed by: Kongkiat Khomsiri
- Starring: Nawat Kulrattanarak; Yuke Songpaisan; Jintanutda Lummakanon; Monchanok Saengchaipiangpen
- Opening theme: "Everyone has its own way" (ทางใครทางมัน) performed by Chirasak "Maew" Panphum
- Ending theme: "Sorry" (ขอโทษ) performed by Jaruwat "Dome" Cheawaram
- Composer: Kanisorn Studio
- Country of origin: Thailand
- Original language: Thai
- No. of episodes: 17

Production
- Producers: Takonkiet Viravan; Niphon Phewnen
- Production location: Bangkok
- Cinematography: Kongkiat Khomsiri & Phya Nimcharoenphong
- Running time: 120 minutes (per episode); Mondays & Tuesdays at 20:20 (ICT)
- Production companies: Exact Co., Ltd. & Scenario Co., Ltd. (in the networks of GMM Grammy)

Original release
- Network: One 31
- Release: 17 August – 12 October 2015

Tawan Tud Burapha (Thai: ตะวันตัดบูรพา; RTGS: Tawan Tat Burapha; lit: The Sun cuts the East; International title: The Brothers) was a Thai TV drama in action/drama and heroic bloodshed genre. It remake from a Channel 5's 2001 drama of the namesake (starred Saksit Tangthong and Jesdaporn Pholdee). It aired on One31 directed and written by Kongkiat Khomsiri.

== Plot summary ==
Tawan (The Sun) and Burapha (The East) are brothers and the sons of a well-known righteous police. They are very close as brothers. Burapha is into boxing, while Tawan wants to follow in their father's footsteps to become a police. One day, they hear a gun shot and go to see what is going on. This way, they witness a murder and when the time comes to point the finger at the killer, Tawan is not hesitantto do the right thing. Burapha knows that the bad guys will not leave their family alone and he begs Tawan not to be a witness. This is how the conflict begins.

== Cast ==
Main

- Nawat Kulrattanarak as Tawan/Tawanchai
- Yuke Songpaisan as Burapha
- Jintanutda Lummakanon as Thicha
- Monchanok Saengchaipiangpen as Joe/Joe Tha Tian

Supporting

- Arnuttaphol Sirichomsaeng as Chatchai
- Phitchanat Sakhakon as Jermchat
- Sorapong Chatree as Ja Wes (Sergeant Wes)
- Billy Ogan as Kieng the Red Dragon
- Santisuk Promsiri as Sia Charoen (Tycoon Charoen)
- Phoori Hiranyapruk as Tat
- Akarat Nimitchai as Dab Suea (POL. SEN. SGT. MAJ. Suea)

== Awards and nominations ==
Year	Award	Category	Recipient	Result
2015	7th Nataraj Awards	Best Cinematography	Kongkiat Khomsiri & Phya Nimcharoenphong	Nominated
2015	7th Nataraj Awards	Best Actor	Nawat Kulrattanarak	Nominated

== International broadcast ==
Country	Channel	Premiere	Title
Vietnam	TVStar - SCTV11	January 1, 2016	Nghịch Chiến Sinh Tử
