= Vasan Sitthiket =

Thai artist (born 1957)

- วสันต์ สิทธิเขตต์
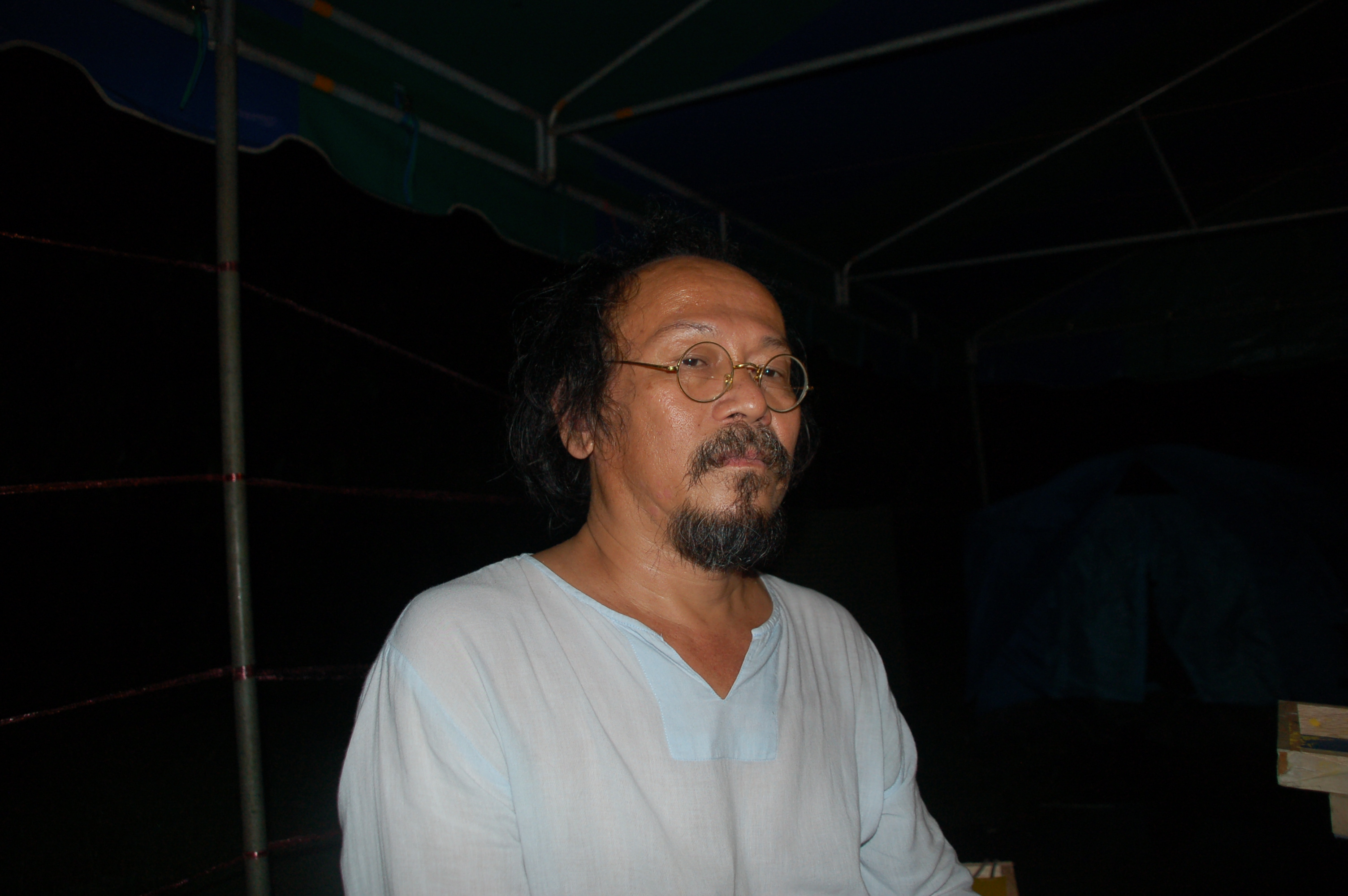
- Vasan in 2008
- Born: 7 October 1957 (age 68); Nakhon Sawan, Thailand
- Education: College of Fine Arts, Bangkok
- Known for: Painting, sculpture, performance art
- Awards: Silpathorn Award; 2007 Visual arts

Vasan Sitthiket (Thai: วสันต์ สิทธิเขตต์; RTGS: Wasan Sitthikhet; born on 7 October 1957 in Nakhon Sawan province, Thailand) is a Thai contemporary visual artist. A graduate of the College of Fine Arts in Bangkok, he has works in many fields, including painting and poetry. He has staged three plays, written more than 10 books of poetry, children's books and political writings.

== Works ==
Active since the 1970s, Vasan's works are often provocative and political in nature. One of his works was a performance art piece involving fake rubber breasts and buttocks and a simulated rape of the entire nation of Thailand.

In 2000, an exhibition of a new collection that included 50 paintings featuring Thai politicians and military officers in sexually compromising poses was cancelled by Chulalongkorn University, five days before it was to open. At the 50th Venice Biennale in 2003, he displayed some large-scale portraits of George W. Bush and other world leaders, created on canvas by using custom-made rubber stamps. Vasan's media has also included drawings, woodcut prints, ceramic sculpture, installations and performances.

In 2005, he set up the Artist Party, a political art project that mocked the then-ruling Thai Rak Thai party and prime minister Thaksin Shinawatra. He has supported the People's Alliance for Democracy ("Yellow Shirts") against Thaksin. The group has used his artwork as backgrounds for their demonstration stages, on their T-shirts and propaganda outlets, and Vasan appeared at the rallies to recite poems or perform music.

In 2007, he received the Silpathorn Award in Visual Arts.
