= Pinaree Sanpitak =

Thai artist

- Born: 1961 (age 64–65); Bangkok, Thailand
- Education: University of Tsukuba, Northern Territory University

Pinaree Sanpitak (born 1961) is a Thai conceptual and contemporary artist. Her work addresses motherhood, womanhood, and self by using the shape of breast to provoke the symbol of feminism and femininity. She attended the University of Tsukuba in Ibaraki, Japan, and Northern Territory University in Darwin, Australia. In 2007, Sanpitak received the Silpathorn Award for Visual Arts from the Thai Ministry of Culture.

== Life and career ==
Pinaree Sanpitak was born in 1961, in Bangkok Thailand. She was born and raised in Bangkok, Thailand and currently lives and works in Bangkok today. She studied visual arts and communication design in the School of Fine Arts and Design at the University of Tsukuba, in Ibaraki, Japan earning a Bachelor of Fine Arts Degree in 1986. During her studies at the university from 1981 to 1986, she earned the Monbusho Scholarship from the Japanese Government. In 1999, she attended Northern Territory University in Darwin, Australia for Printmaking Workshop. In 2000, she attended the International Artists’ Studio Program in Stockholm, Sweden. In 2001, she attended the Headlands Centre for Arts in Sausalito, California.

Her work was included in the 2024 exhibition Making Their Mark: Works from the Shah Garg Collection at the Berkeley Art Museum and Pacific Film Archive (BAMPFA). Her work was included in the 2025 exhibition Dis/orient: Contemporary Art of the Asian Diaspora at the Nasher Museum of Art, Durham, NC.

== Influences and inspirations ==
Pinaree Sanpitak is one of the most compelling and respected Thai artists of her generation. Her work is among the most powerful explorations of women's experiences in Southeast Asia. She demonstrates an intentionally feminine sensibility to her artistic practice. Sanpitak injects Thailand's burgeoning contemporary art scene with a strong female presence. Her primary inspiration is the female body, distilled to it is the most basic form of the human breast. Her work is modelled after attending the University of Tsukuba in Japan and got inspired by the colourful intensity of traditional Thai art. She uses various art techniques such as painting, sculpting, drawings, culinary art, etc. to explore the female form. A central motif in her work has been the female breast. The inspiration of the female breast became intensified after giving birth to her only child 21 years ago. While nursing her son she became conscious of how the breast upheld itself, she has looked beyond the mother and child connection to the breast as a metaphor for womanhood and self. Her most famous work are breast-shaped cushions where people can rest on and explore their sensory perception.

== Selected works ==
Hanging by a Thread (2012), consists of 18 hammocks, crafted from paa-lai, multicolored cotton textile that are also used for clothing, sheets, and items of ordinary life. The 18 hammocks are hung around 10th century sculpture of the Hindu god "Vishnu", which was created during the Khmer Empire. Vishnu represents the protector; meaning there would be no need to move it as it would protect the art work. She crafted pieces that seem to float in to space; it is suspended in the air, which offers a sense of safety but also serve as ghostly reminders of lost lives. This artwork was installed in the debut at Tyler Rollins Fine Art in New York, the hanging pieces were originally installed lopsided, which was not intentional, however, Sanpitak left them like that because it represented the unstable environment.

Temporary Insanity (2003-2004), a silk, synthetic fiber, battery, motor, propeller, sound device, dimensions variable. This was Installed at the Austin's AMOA- Arthouse, which explored the liminal space between genders while navigating between the silks of Thailand and the sands of Texas. This exhibition consists of 100 soft sculptures, and Sanpitak poetically muddles bodily forms and their associative functions. It is an arrangement of roundish cushioned objects, placed directly on the gallery floor. The objects present interactivity with the audience. They produce a soft audio effect that is mechanically derived of natural sound. "The shapes are more morphed, both breasts and balls". The effects are not only a blurring of genders, but also a blending of the human and the inanimate. Temporary Insanity recalls Buddhist practices by inviting viewers to stoop on the group, which invokes the conventional gesture of paying respect and offering prayer. The warm colour and dyed silk objects evoke both flesh and the countryside, the world recalls the palette of Buddhist pagoda frescoes and ceremonial objects.

noon- nom (2001-2002), organza, synthetic fibers, 55 pieces. This artwork was presented in Singapore Art Museum collection. The word "Nom" in the title translates as breast milk, which emphasizes each term's nurturing function. The work's title and form both evoke earliest instinct of nestling into the soft, fleshiness of the mother's chest in search of warmth and sustenance. noon-nom invites the visitor to not only touch the artwork, but also be touched, getting up close and personal with a familiar form that is nurturing, sensual, and sacred: the human female breast. These soft sculptures covered in organza are part of Sanpitak's ongoing and extensive body of works across different media and genre incorporating the human corpus as a vessel and mound. She questions the attitudes toward the female breast in significance as a natural form that symbolizes nourishment and comfort as well as portraying sensuous and spiritual feminine body. This artwork creates a physical and metaphorical space where participants can freely interact with tactile sculpture. noon-nom illustrates the importance of touching and feeling as a means of reconnecting human relationships.

Womanly Abstract art work: Womanly Bodies (1998), made with saa fiber & ratan, Womanly Echo (1998), made with acrylics and pastels collage on canvas, and Womanly Slick (1998), made with acrylic, pastel, ink, and charcoal on paper. These installations resemble temple stupas, and are inspired by churches. It is a metaphor; "I’m trying to put the female into a religious context, because we are so segregated". Womanly Echo and Womanly Slick have a collage overlaid in monochrome so that the Bessel is stark and hard- edged with contour lines. "Using black concentrates my work. Black represents melancholy". She believes that black is just another colour, it is not about sorrow. Womanly Bodies consisted of 25 rhythmic sculptures standing 2-½ m tall, their stitched saa fiber material gives them a coarse texture and organic distortions in their repetitious stature. The first inspection of work spears to be less sexually changed, the direct reference of this is females are seen as sex objects.

== Collections ==
Sanpitak work is in the collections of the Los Angeles County Museum of Art (LACMA), Los Angeles, CA, USA, The Asian Art Museum, San Francisco, CA, USA, Queensland Art Gallery, Brisbane, Australia, Fukuoka Asian Art Museum, Fukuoka, Japan, Singapore Art Museum, Singapore,

== Reception ==
Curator Jasmin Stephen says that Pinaree has engaged with notions of the self, feminism, and female experience for many years. Her approach to these issues is an expansive one, which has been shaped by her experience of showing all over the world. Stephen goes on and says "I think her works of resisting any dominating or ridged accounts of feminism while being of interest to scholars and audiences engaged in feminism throughout the world. An unknown curated stated regarding Sanpitak’s Breast Stupa Cookery Project states "this process of exchange is like a rebirth; it symbolically manifests the life cycle" as the breast stupa creates are never the same or repeated.

== Femininity and feminism ==
Femininity on a Plate (Breast Stupa Cookery – 2005) An adverse effect of Pinaree Sanpitak's signature work provokes hallucinating objects like boobs, whether fried eggs, bowls, lampshades etc. Sanpitak expresses her thoughts and experiences through breasts taking into culinary art. "It’s my lifetime project," says the artist, who has collaborated with cooks and chefs from many countries to express the symbol of femininity on the plate. Sanpitak worked with professional and amateur chefs to create meals using specially designed breast stupa- shaped cooking molds made in glass aluminum and glazed stoneware. The artist and her collaborator-chefs have hosted many of these events, presenting their five-course nourishing nipple- meals to audiences in Thailand, Japan, China, Spain, France, and the United States. "The inspiration came when I gave birth to my son. I used the breast shape, which is a beautiful form, to represent myself and also to symbolize not only motherhood but also femininity, and womanhood. There is a deeper meaning because when you look at mothers breast- feeding their child, it’s about both giving and receiving". The recipes and cooking process are documented and compiled as videos and cookbooks. In August 2005, the first official Breast Stupa Cookery event took place at the Jim Thompson House, which involved four chefs in preparing a buffet banquet for 200 guests. Over four years, Breast Stupa Cookery events has been organized over the world. The Breast Stupa culinary experience changes people's perceptions and make them look beyond what they see on the plate.
