= Nat Yontararak =

Thai pianist

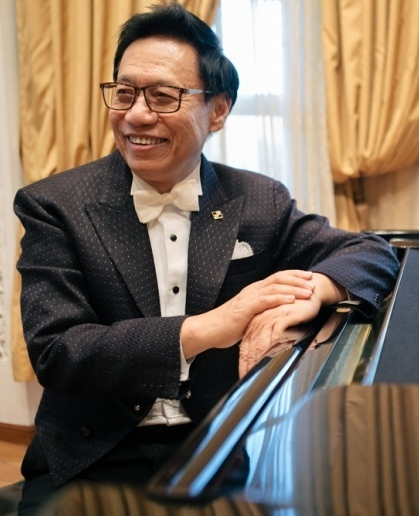
- Yontararak at Sala Sudasiri Sobha in Bangkok, Thailand
- Born: 6 October 1954 (age 72); Bangkok, Thailand
- Education: Chulalongkorn University; Goldsmiths College; University of Reading
- Occupation: Pianist

Nat Yontararak (Thai: ณัฐ ยนตรรักษ์: born 6 October 1954), is a Thai classical pianist, composer and music teacher.

== Biography ==
Nat was born in Bangkok and studied at Bangkok Christian College. He started learning piano at the age of nine and became a student of Pantipa Treepoonpol.

He won the first prize in the first Siam Music Festival in 1971 when he was 16.

For college, he attended Chulalongkorn University, and graduated with a degree from the Faculty of Architecture.

He continued with music for his graduate studies, attending Goldsmiths College in London. He won a scholarship and a British Council support grant for further study in Piano Performance at the University of Reading. He also received a grant from H.H. Princess Sudasiri Sobha.

He returned to Thailand in 1983 and set up his own studio and music school.

In addition to teaching and composing, he regularly gives concerts, both in Thailand and abroad.

Among his works is the piano sonata, "Glory to Our Great Kings", which was presented at the United Nations as part of the commemoration of the 50th session of the UN General Assembly in October 1995.

He was given the Silpathorn Award for Thai contemporary artists in 2006.

Yontararak has been a Steinway Artist since 2003.

Nat Yontararak married Wongdeaun Indharavud (Pa-Wongdeaun Yontararak), who performed the leading role in Vichit Kounavudhi's 1978 drama - First Wife (Mia Luang) and Suwat Woradilok's 1979 film - Son of the Slave (Look Thas). Wongdeaun Indharavud is the great-granddaughter of Chao Keo Naovarat, the last king of Chiang Mai. He is the uncle of Thai singer Nicha Yontararak, better known as Minnie of (G)I-dle.

== Discography ==
- Glory to Our Great Kings (Marco-Polo/Naxos)
