= OK Baytong =

- The Thai film poster.
- Directed by: Nonzee Nimibutr
- Written by: Nonzee Nimibutr
- Produced by: Duangkamol Limcharoen
- Starring: Phoovarit Phumpuang; Jeeranan Manojam
- Cinematography: Chankit Chamnivikaipong
- Edited by: Pen-Ek Ratanaruang
- Music by: Chatchai Pongprapaphan
- Distributed by: Sahamongkol Film International
- Release date: 26 December 2003
- Running time: 98 minutes
- Country: Thailand
- Language: Thai

OK Baytong (Thai: โอเค เบตง) is a 2003 Thai drama film about Buddhist-Muslim relations in southern Thailand. It is written and directed by Nonzee Nimibutr.

== Plot ==
Tum is a young man who has been a monk living in a Buddhist monastery in Thailand since he was 5 years old, but after hearing that his sister has been killed in an attack on a train by insurgents, he decides to leave the monastery and make his way to southern Thailand, where his sister ran a beauty salon in a town called Betong, in a district in Yala Province, on the border with Malaysia.

In looking to put his sister's affairs in order, Tum finds himself conflicted. His sister has a daughter, by a Muslim man who lives on the Malaysian side of the border. He is torn between running his sister's business, and taking a larger role in her child's life.

In addition to his duties to his sister, Tum deals with internal conflict regarding his romantic and sexual attraction for a woman, as well as his feelings regarding Muslims, whom he holds responsible for his sister's death.

== Cast ==
- Phoovarit Phumpuang as Tum
- Jeeranan Manojam as Lynn
- Saranya Kruengsai

== Film festivals ==
OK Baytong was shown at many film festivals worldwide in 2004, including:

- Bangkok International Film Festival
- Berlin Film Festival
- Hawaii International Film Festival
- Hong Kong International Film Festival
- New York Asian Film Festival
- Pusan International Film Festival
- Seattle International Film Festival
- Vancouver International Film Festival
