= Apichart Choosakul =

Thai actor (1956–2010)

- Born: Apichart Choosakul; 1956; Nong Khae, Saraburi, Thailand
- Died: September 6, 2010 (aged 54); Ramkhamhaeng Hospital, Bangkok
- Other names: Muek (หมึก)
- Citizenship: Thai
- Education: Assumption College; Chulalongkorn University
- Occupations: Actor; assistant director
- Years active: 1980s–2010
- Known for: Dang Bireley's and Young Gangsters (1997)
- Spouse: Chamaiporn Kalayanamitr

Apichart Choosakul, also known as Abhijati Jusakul (Thai: อภิชาติ ชูสกุล; 1956 – September 6, 2010), was a Thai actor and director. He is known for his role Dang Bireley's and Young Gangsters (1997).

== Life and career ==
Choosakul was born in Saraburi in central Thailand, graduated from Assumption College and received bachelor's degree from Faculty of Communication Arts, Chulalongkorn University.

He became widely known in 1997 as Moo Chien (Sgt Chien) in Dang Bireley's and Young Gangsters, a former mafia police officer who is a senior friend of a group of teenage gangsters led by Dang Bireley. He performed so well that it was memorable to the audience in the style of a discreet old gangster. Someone gave him the nickname "Thai Morgan Freeman".

Since then he has acted in many films and TV series as a supporting actor and has been an assistant director in many Thai and international films such as The Legend of Suriyothai (2001), Stealth (2005), Rambo IV (2008) etc.

In terms of personal life, he was married to Chamaiporn Kalayanamitr for more than 30 years.

=== Death ===
He died on September 6, 2010, from liver cancer. It was detected in February of the same year.

== Selected filmography ==
=== As actor ===
==== Film ====
- Dang Bireley's and Young Gangsters as Sgt Chien (1996)
- The Beach as Cannabis plantation owner (2000)
- Ang Yee: Luuk chaai phan mangkawn as Sa Zhu (2000)
- City of Ghosts (2002)
- Headless Hero as Suea Men (2002)
- Shutter (2004)
- Just Friend (2004)
- Rescue Dawn as Phisit (2005)
- Nong Teng Nakleng-pukaotong as Luang Samai (2006)
- Headless Ghost (2007)
- Ghost Station (2007)
- Elephant White as Advisor Bhun (2011)
- Mindfulness and Murder (2011)

==== Television ====
- Silk Knot as Editor Tao (2001)
- Niraj sorng pop as Phraya Phonthep (2002)
- Nong Mai Rai Borisut as Pol Snr Sgt Maj Lek (2004)
- Tarksin Maharaj as Phra Chieng-ngoen (2007)

=== As assistant director ===
- Aces Go Places 5: The Terracotta Hit (1989)
- Heaven & Earth (1993)
- Mortal Kombat (1995)
- The Legend of Suriyothai (2001)
- Return To Paradise (2001)
- Stealth (2005)
- Rambo IV (2008)

== Accolades ==
- Bangkok Critics Assembly Awards 1997 (Best Supporting Actor)
