= Kulapat Yantrasast =

Thai architect and designer

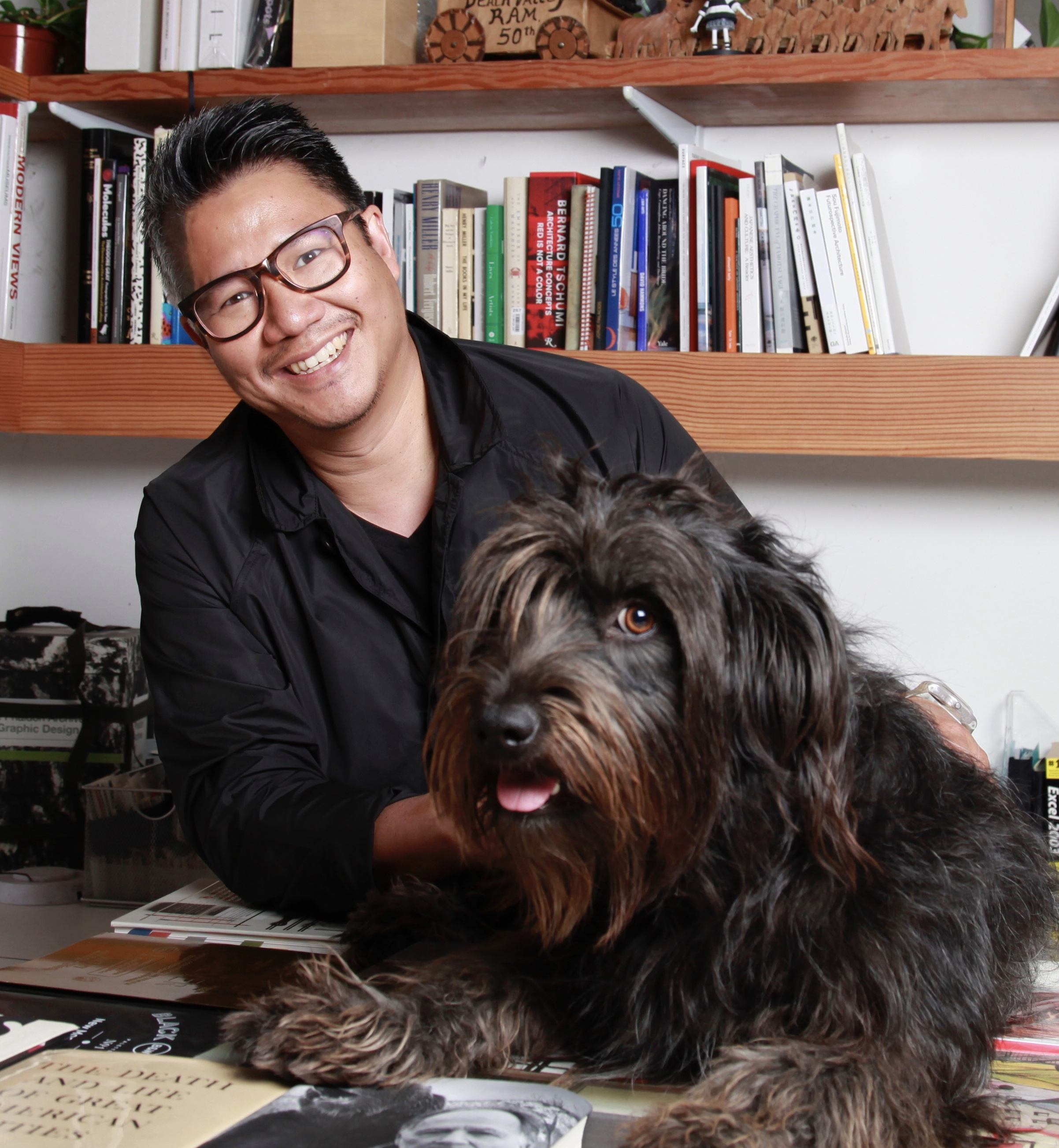
- Kulapat Yantrasast in 2015
- Born: Bangkok, Thailand
- Education: Chulalongkorn University; University of Tokyo
- Occupation: Architect
- Awards: Silpathorn Award
- Practice: wHY
- Buildings: Grand Rapids Art Museum, Grand Rapids, Michigan Speed Art Museum, Louisville, Kentucky The Metropolitan Museum of Art AAOA Galleries, New York, New York EPA Center Arts, East Palo Alto, California

Kulapat Yantrasast (Thai: กุลภัทร ยันตรศาสตร, born in 1968 or 1969 in Bangkok) is an architect and designer. Originally from Thailand and now based in Los Angeles, he is a founding partner and Creative Director of WHY, a multidisciplinary design practice. In 2007 Yantrasast led the design for the Grand Rapids Art Museum, the first art museum building in the world to receive the LEED Gold certification for environmentally sustainable design.

== Background ==
Yantrasast was born in Bangkok, Thailand, where he graduated with honors from Chulalongkorn University. He received his M.Arch. and Ph.D. degrees in architecture from the University of Tokyo, under a Japanese Government scholarship.

He is currently on the Board of Trustees of the Pulitzer Arts Foundation and the Noguchi Museum, and he is part of the Artists Council for the Hammer Museum at UCLA. Yantrasast has served on the Artists’ Committee of the Americans for the Arts since 2005.

== Professional career ==
From 1996 to 2003, Yantrasast worked as an associate of Japanese architect Tadao Ando, responsible for international projects including the Modern Art Museum of Fort Worth in Fort Worth, Texas (2002), Armani / Teatro in Milan, Italy (2001), Fondation Francois Pinault pour l’Art Contemporain in Paris, France (2001–2003), the Calder Museum project in Philadelphia, PA, (1999–2002) and the Clark Art Institute in Williamstown, MA (2001–2014) as well as international design competitions.

Yantrasast co-founded WHY Architecture in 2003 with Yo-Ichiro Hakomori. The studio's first major commission was the completion of the Grand Rapids Art Museum (2007) in Michigan. WHY has since worked on a number of large museum projects, including the expansion of the Speed Art Museum in Louisville, KY, and gallery design and planning for Harvard Art Museums and the Art Institute of Chicago.

The practice is currently engaged in major gallery renovation projects including the Rockefeller Wing of the Metropolitan Museum of Art and the Northwest Coast Hall at the American Museum of Natural History. Other leading cultural projects include a new contemporary art museum in Makati, Philippines, and the Tchaikovsky Academic Opera and Ballet Theater in Perm, Russia.

Yantrasast has also designed a number of private residences, including large scale homes in Malibu, Venice Beach, and Beverly Hills, CA, and villas in Chiang Mai and Phuket in Thailand.

The practice has been working with a consortium of civic leaders, private developers, and urban planners to revitalize the historic Portland Warehouse District adjacent to Louisville, Kentucky. In 2017 and 2018 respectively, the WHY Landscape Workshop won two international competitions to design large-scale urban parks: West Princes Street Gardens and the Ross Pavilion in Edinburgh, Scotland, and Rees Ridge Waterfront Park in Toronto, Canada. Yantrasast is also involved in community projects in California, including a mixed-use affordable housing compound in Watts, Los Angeles and EPACENTER Arts, a youth arts and music center in East Palo Alto. In 2017, Yantrasast designed a new west coast flagship Christie's office and exhibition space in Beverly Hills.

In September 2023, the Asian Art Museum of San Francisco sued WHY for allegedly failing to fully deliver a $38 million expansion project completed in March 2020. According to the lawsuit, the expansion project was delivered behind schedule, and did not meet minimum museum-quality standards, requiring significant remediation from the museum. WHY contends that issues with the building are the result of construction failures and the builder not following WHY's design or "basic, standard construction practices".

In September 2024, the Musée du Louvre announced that Yantrasast and WHY Architecture had been selected to design the most significant museographic overhaul at the renowned French museum in over a decade. Working in collaboration with the Paris-based BGC Studio, WHY Architecture was unanimously selected to design the Louvre's new department dedicated to Byzantine and Eastern Christian Art. Additionally, WHY Architecture and BGC Studio will complete a total renovation of the Roman Antiquities trail. The French-American team will be led by Yantrasast. This newest department at the Louvre is scheduled to open in 2027.

== Awards and recognition ==
In 2009, Yantrasast received the Silpathorn Award for Design from Thailand's Ministry of Culture for outstanding achievement and notable contributions to Thai contemporary arts and culture. He was the first architect to receive the award.

Yantrasast was named of the 100 Most Powerful People in the Art World by Art+Auction magazine in their 2012 Power 100 issue.

In 2020, Architectural Digest listed WHY on AD100, their annual survey of the top names in interior decoration, architecture, and landscape design.

== Notable works ==
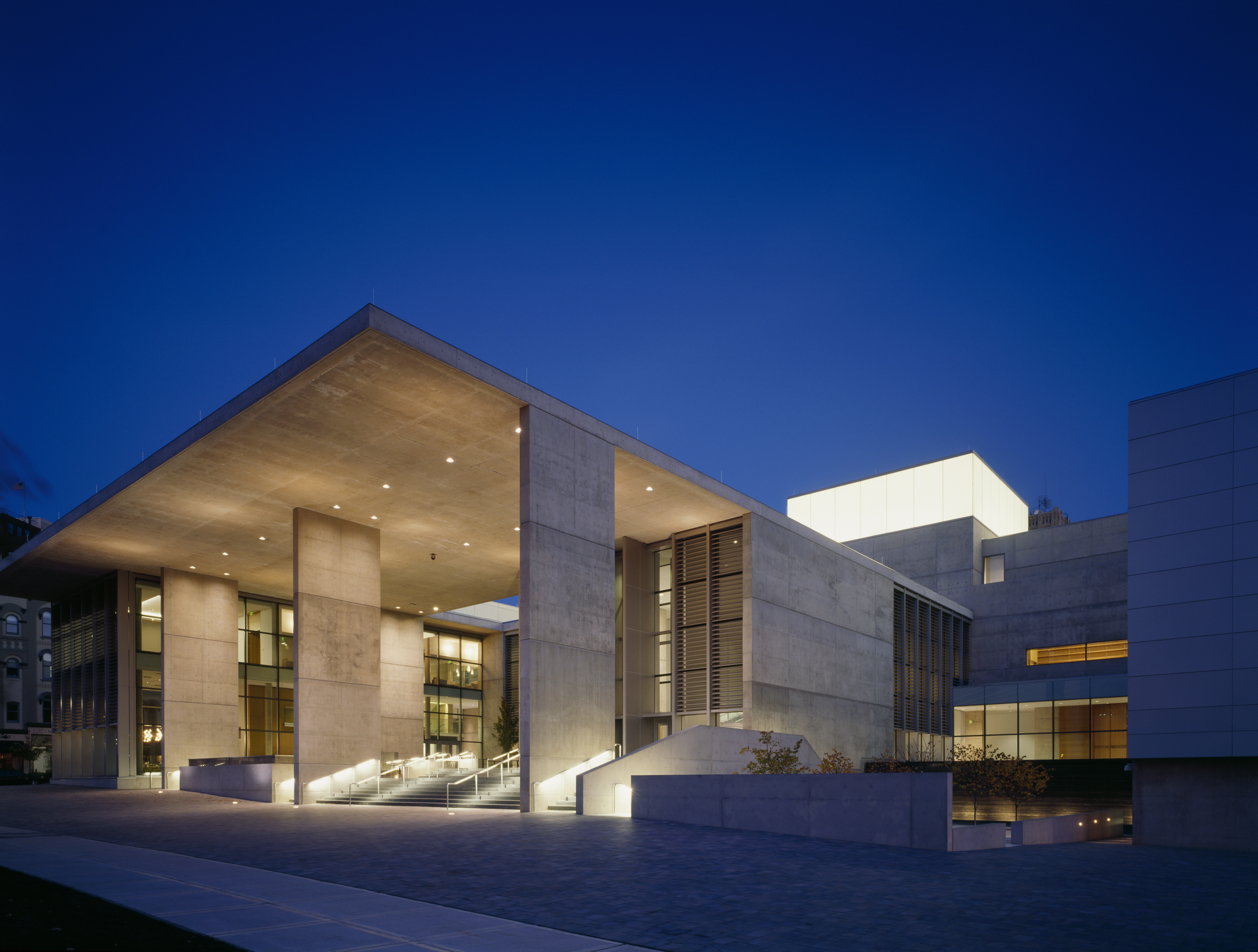
Grand Rapids Art Museum, Grand Rapids, Michigan, (2007)

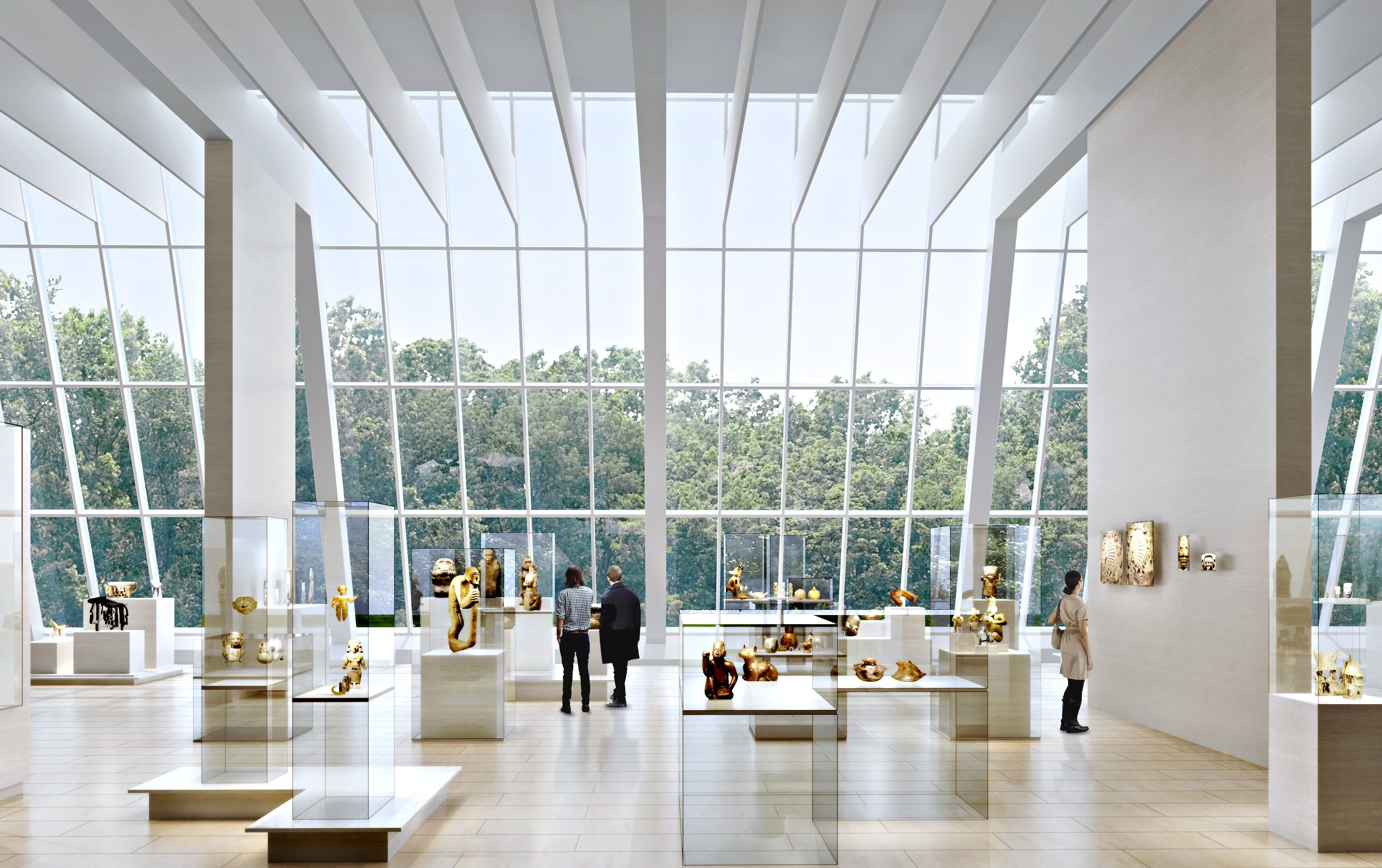
The Metropolitan Museum of Art AAOA Galleries, New York, New York (2025)

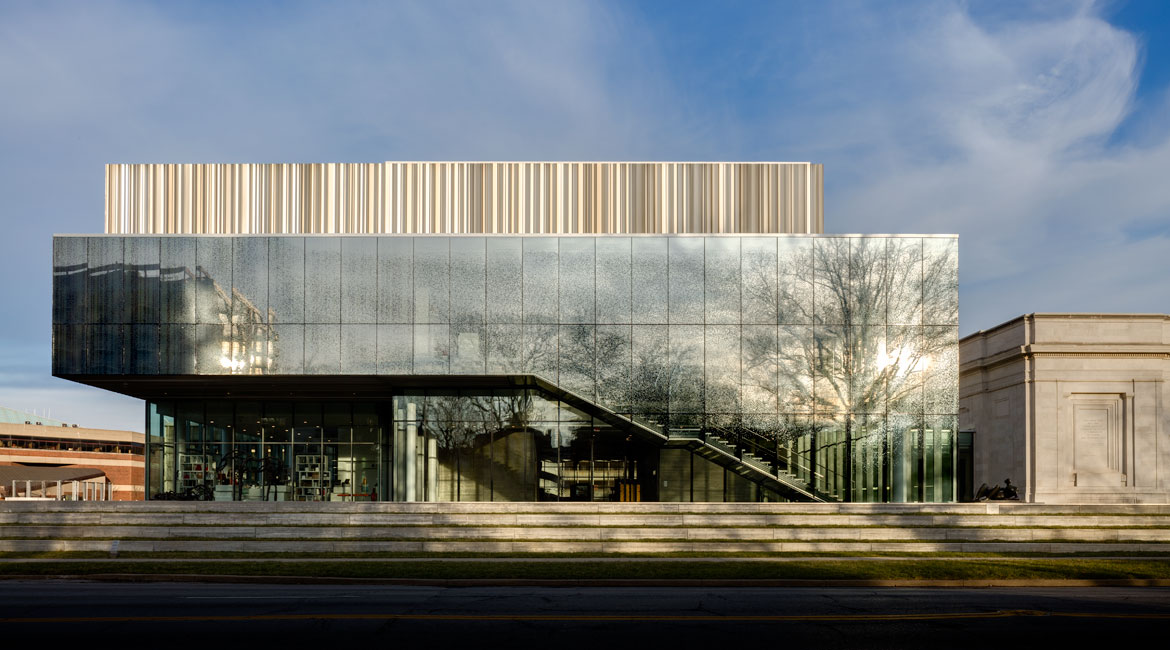
Speed Art Museum, Louisville, Kentucky (2016)

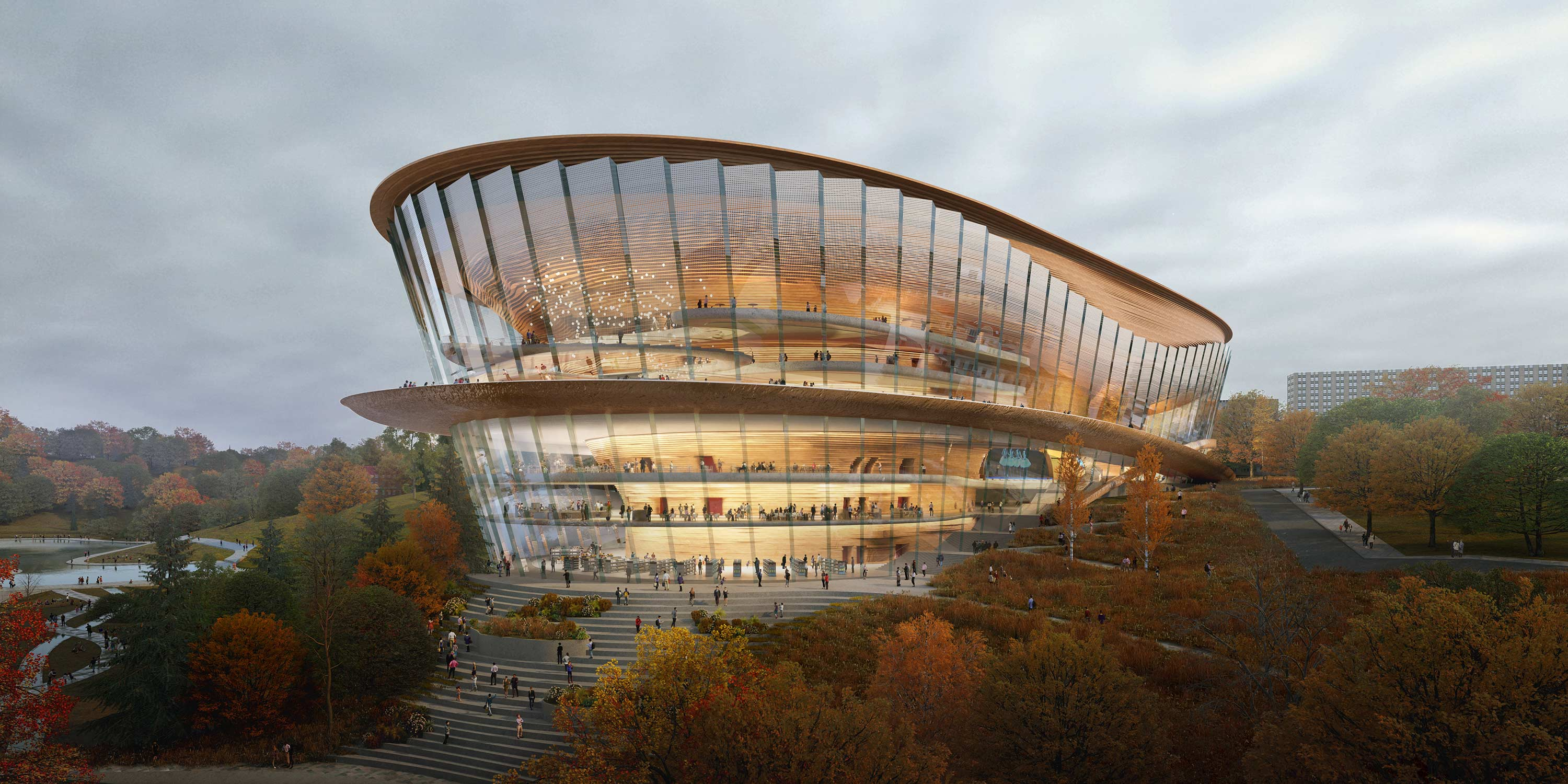
Perm Tchaikovsky Opera and Ballet Theatre, Perm, Russia (2020- )
- Asian Art Museum of San Francisco (2018)
- American Museum of Natural History Northwest Coast Hall (2017)
- Marciano Art Foundation (2017)
- David Kordansky Gallery (2014)
- L&M Arts Gallery (2010)
- Galleries at the Art Institute of Chicago (2007)
- Studio Art Hall, Pomona College (2014)
- Galleries at the Harvard Art Museum (2015)
- Walkway at the Worcester Art Museum (2015)
- Interpretative Green Bridge at the Los Angeles River
