= Dang Bireley =

Thai gangster

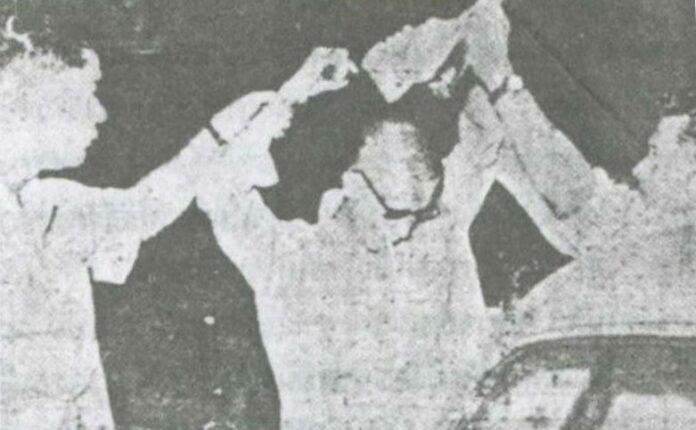
- A photograph of Dang Bireley while he was surrendering to the police
- Born: Bancha Sisuksai (บัญชา ศรีสุกใส); 1940; Trok Salak Hin, Pathum Wan, Bangkok, Thailand
- Died: 1964 (around 24 years); New Phetchaburi Road, Bangkok, Thailand
- Resting place: Wat Saket, Pom Prap Sattru Phai, Bangkok, Thailand; 13.753475°N 100.50838°E
- Other names: Dang, Dang Bireley
- Criminal charges: Leader of young gangsters
- Spouse: Wallapa na Songkhla

Dang Bireley (Note: Also written as Daeng Bireley.) (Thai: แดง ไบเล่), a Thai teenage gangster, became widely known through his portrayal in retro films of the 1950s and early 1960s, particularly Dang Bireley's and Young Gangsters in 1997. Many people first learned about him through the cinematic representation of his life.

== Biography ==
He was born around 1940 in Trok Salak Hin, a narrow alley branching off Rong Mueang Road, beside Hua Lamphong railway station in Bangkok. In the film Dang Bireley's and Young Gangsters, his mother is depicted as a prostitute. In reality, Dang's mother was not a prostitute. She had previously worked as a housekeeper in a brothel located in Trok Bireley, beside Wat Suthat. She gave birth to Dang later in life. When the original owner of the brothel planned to retire, she was entrusted to manage the business as a means to support Dang's upbringing. Daeng and his mother moved to this area, where he acquired the nickname "Bireley" after the alley. At that time, the alley (Note: The house where Dang once lived and the Bireley's soda factory, now officially called Soi Siriphat, no longer exist as they did in the past.) was also home to the Bireley's soft drink factory.

As Dang grew up, he became the leader of a group of teenage delinquents. He was good-looking, charming, and generous, which drew many friends around him. Each had a nickname, like Pu the Bottle Bomb, Dum Esso, Lam Sing, Phot Charoen Phat, Piak Charoen Phat, Pu Krung Kasem, Lo Saphan Khao, also known as Lo the Cleaver, Phan Lang Wang, Lo Mansi, and Jod Howdy. They were known as the "Ko Lang Wang" (โก๋หลังวัง, lit. 'gangsters behind the palace') named after the area behind Wang Burapha. This was a popular spot for young people to gather.

According to Pu Krung Kasem (Note: His real name was Banjured Kridsanayut (บรรเจิด กฤษณายุทธ). He later became the husband of the famous singer Thitima Suttasunthorn. Banjured passed away in 2022 at the age of 85.), one of Dang's close friends, who spoke on the TV program Johjai on Channel 5 in 1997, he and Dang were not friends at first. They were just teenage delinquents of the same era. Dang was active on the Phra Nakhon side, while Pu and his friends stayed on the Thonburi side. One day, as Pu was about to start wearing long school trousers, he went to Bang Lamphu to buy fabric. There, he met Dang's group at a food stall in the middle of the Sip Sam Hang Road. Both groups glared at each other and agreed to have a fight the next day. This became a key scene in the film Suek Sim Sam Hang Bang Lamphu (ศึก 13 ห้างบางลำพู, lit. 'the battle of Sip Sam Hang, Bang Lamphu'). Pu and his friends said the film exaggerated the story and it was never that violent in reality.

He also recounted that Dang Bireley and Pu the Bottle Bomb later had a falling out, though it was not violent and had nothing to do with a woman, contrary to the film's story about Wallapa (Note: Wallapa's real name was Wallapa na Songkhla (วัลภา ณ สงขลา). She passed away in 2019 at the age of 75 in Nonthaburi. She and Dang had one son together.), a nightclub singer who was Dang's girlfriend. The real conflict began when Dang won a knife duel in front of a large crowd at Suphachalasai Stadium during a school sports event against students from another school. Dang's victory and the fame he gained made him feel grown-up and independent. This annoyed his close friend Pu, who then harassed Wallapa at the bowling alley in Gaysorn Plaza, trying to provoke her to tell Dang, so that the two friends would come into conflict.

Wallapa said he was polite and well-mannered. He didn't drink or smoke, and his favorite drink was a milkshake.

The fact, which is completely different from the film, is that Dang eventually became a monk and did not die in a car accident while traveling to work for Tycoon Jiew, an influential figure in Chonburi. Instead, he passed away in a traffic accident in Bangkok.

== Later life & death ==
According to Wallapa and Pu Krung Kasem, after Dang was ordained at Wat Suthat, he did not remain at peace for long. Pu the Bottle Bomb and Dum Esso followed and harassed him even at the temple, leading to confrontations. The police later contacted Wallapa and asked her to persuade Dang to surrender, assuring that he would not be pursued further or harmed. Wallapa relayed the message and convinced Dang to turn himself in. He left the monkhood without a formal ceremony and surrendered to the authorities. The court sentenced him to two years in Lat Yao Prison. However, due to his good behavior and his role assisting prison guards and medical staff, his sentence was reduced, and he served just over a year.

Dang died shortly after his release. Wallapa later recalled that Dang was only around 23 or 24 years old at the time of his death, around 1964. That night, he had gone to a nightclub where she was performing, accompanied by a friend she did not know, a student returning from studying in the United States. Dang and his friend got into an altercation with another table of customers. Fearing Wallapa might get into trouble as well, Dang went to confront them in a small alley outside the club. He and his friend were overpowered, so they attempted to escape in the friend's sports car. On the way, the driver swerved to avoid an oncoming truck, and Dang was thrown from the car, hitting his head on the curb. His skull was crushed, and he died instantly on New Phetchaburi Road. Wallapa only learned of his death from his relatives the following day. At present, the ashes of Dang and his mother are kept at Wat Saket in Bangkok.

== In popular culture ==
In addition to the 1997 film Dang Bireley's and Young Gangsters starring Jesdaporn Pholdee, which is a well-known portrayal of Dang, up to the present the character Dang Bireley has appeared in contemporary media two more times: in the 2012 film The Gangster played by Somchai Khemklad, and in the 2025 stage adaptation of Dang Bireley's and Young Gangsters performed by Naphat Siangsomboon. He was later adapted into a 2026 television series on One31 titled Bangkok Gangster, starring Sutthirak Subvijitra.
