= Silpathorn Award =

Annual award for Thai contemporary artists

The Office of Contemporary Art and Culture emblem, upon which the design of the Silpathorn Award brooch is based.

The Silpathorn Award, Thai: รางวัลศิลปาธร, is an honour for living Thai contemporary artists presented annually by the Office of Contemporary Art and Culture, Ministry of Culture of Thailand. The awards were established in 2004 to promote Thai contemporary artists who are considered to be in their mid-career and who have already made notable contributions to Thai fine arts and culture.

Artists are honored in the fields of visual arts, literature, music, film, performing arts, design and architecture.

== History ==
Education and promotion of fine arts in the Kingdom of Thailand was under the auspices of the Department of Fine Arts of the Ministry of Palace Affairs. In 1943, the department's schools became Silpakorn University, founded by Silpa Bhirasri, an Italian sculptor who was named Corrado Feroci, but became a Thai citizen during World War II and is considered the father of fine arts in Thailand.

Other offices promoting fine arts included the Office of the National Culture Commission and the Religious Affairs Department.

In 1985, the Office of the National Culture Commission established the Thailand National Artist designation, which is conferred on notable Thai artists as a lifetime achievement award.

The Office of Contemporary Art and Culture (OCAC), under the Ministry of Culture, was formed in 2001 and was tasked with supporting, and promoting contemporary art and culture. While the National Artist programme has been generally aimed at veteran artists, especially those in the areas of Thai traditional arts, the OCAC recognised that younger artists needed support, promotion and recognition as well. In 2004, the Silpathorn Award was created, with honorees in the fields of visual art, literature, music, film and performing arts. In 2008, an award for the field of design was added.

=== Qualifications ===
Silpathorn Award honorees must meet the following qualifications:

- Thai nationals.
- Between the ages 30 to 50 years and still alive on the announcement day.
- Their works have continually been exposed to the general public until present.
- Their works have been released in Thailand and have made a great impact on Thai contemporary art and inspired young artists.

=== Silpathorn Kitikhun award ===
In 2008, a Distinguished ("Kitikhun") category was created for senior artists over 50 years of age who, because of controversy or unconventional works, would likely never be considered for the more conservative Thailand National Artist honor. At first this category was known in English as the "Honorary" category, but the translation was changed to "Distinguished" at the time the awards were actually given. This is because it was felt that in English an "honorary" award might be considered to be less "real" whereas the intent of the committee was to create a senior grade of the award.

=== Definition of Silpathorn ===
Silpathorn in Thai language is a combination of two words: "Silpa", meaning "Art", and "Thorn" (or "Torn"), meaning "the Upholder", thus Silpathorn means "Upholder of Art".

=== Silpathorn brooch, cash prize ===
The Silpathorn Award is in the form of a brooch, modeled on the emblem of the Office of Contemporary Art and Culture, and made of white and yellow gold and decorated with diamonds and emeralds. There is also a cash prize, which as of 2007 was 100,000 baht.

== List of Silpathorn Award winners ==
| Year | Visual arts | Literature | Music | Film | Performing arts | Design^{[A]} | Architecture^{[B]} |
|---|---|---|---|---|---|---|---|
| 2004 | Chalermchai Kositpipat | Chart Korbjitti | Danu Huntrakul | Pen-Ek Ratanaruang | Pradit Prasarttong | | |
| 2005 | Pornchai Jaima | Saksiri Meesomsueb | Bundit Ungrangsee | Apichatpong Weerasethakul | Manop Meejamrus | | |
| 2006 | Chatchai Puipia | Win Lyovarin | Nat Yontararak | Wisit Sasanatieng | Pichet Klunchuen | | |
| 2007 | Pinaree Sanpitak; Vasan Sitthiket; Rirkrit Tiravanija | Siriworn Kaewkan | Narong Prangcharoen | Thunska Pansittivorakul | Nimit Pipithkul | | |
| 2008 | Araya Rasdjarmrearnsook | Paiwarin Khao-Ngam; Khajornrit Raksa | Narongrit Dhamabutra | Nonzee Nimibutr | Sineenadh Keitprapa | Sompis Phosakul | |
| 2009 | Phatyos Buddhacharoen; Sakarin Krue-on | Orasom Suddhisakorn | Den Euprasert | Pimpaka Towira | Janaprakal Chandruang | Kulapat Yantrasast; Eggarat Wongcharit; Somchai Jongsaeng; Prinya Roj-arayanont | |
| 2010 | Navin Rawanchaikul | Saneh Sangsuk | Chaiyoot Tosa-nga | Aditya Assarat | Nikorn Saetang | Withoon Khunalangkan (interior design); Pracha Suveeranont (graphic design); Wasinburi Supanichwarapat (design) | Patama Roonrakwit |
| 2019 | Natee Utarit | Worapoj Panpong | Anan Nakkong | Sayombhu Mukdeeprom | Damkeng Thitapiyasak | Singh Intrachooto | Boonserm Premthada |
| 2020 | Arin Rungjang | Uten Mahamid | Kaiwan Kulavadhanothai | Wannasak Sirilar | Anocha Suwichakornpong | Surachai Puthikulangkura | Chatpong Chuenruedeemol |
| 2021 | Pratchaya Phinthong | Veerasak Chansongsang | Anothai Nitibhon | Sumontha Suanpolrat | Nawapol Thamrongrattanarit | Kritsana Yensutjai | Tonkao Panin |
| 2022 | Tawatchai Puntasawasdi | Jadet Kamjorndet | Chaipak Patarajinda | Sarawanee Tanatanit | Lee Chatameteekul | Nakarin Yano | Varudh Varavarn |
| 2023 | Tawan Wattuya | Jidanun Lueangpiansamut | Damrih Banawitayakit | Monthatip Suksopha | Anucha Boonyawatana | Isr Upa-in | Attaporn Kobkongsanti |

^{A} Design award initiated in 2008.
^{B} Architecture award initiated in 2010.

== List of Distinguished ("Kitikhun") Silpathorn Award winners ==
The Distinguished Silpathorn Award was created in 2008.

=== 2008 ===
- S. P. Somtow, composer, conductor and author
- Saiyart Semangern, designer
- Suwan Kongkhuntien, designer

=== 2009 ===
- Bruce Gaston, composer and musician

=== 2010 ===
- No honorees named

== See also ==
- S.E.A. Write Award
- Thailand National Artist
- Cinema of Thailand
- Culture of Thailand
- Dance of Thailand
- Music of Thailand
