= Bangkok Dangerous (1999 film) =

1999 Thai action film

- Poster
- Directed by: The Pang Brothers
- Written by: The Pang Brothers
- Produced by: Adirek Wattaleela; Nonzee Nimibutr; Pracha Maleenont; Brian L. Marcar
- Starring: Pawalit Mongkolpisit; Premsinee Ratanasopha; Patharawarin Timkul; Pisek Intrakanchit; Korkiate Limpapat
- Cinematography: Decha Srimantra
- Edited by: The Pang Brothers
- Music by: Orange Music
- Distributed by: Film Bangkok
- Release date: November 1, 1999
- Running time: 105 minutes
- Country: Thailand
- Language: Thai

Bangkok Dangerous (Thai: บางกอกแดนเจอรัส เพชฌฆาตเงียบ อันตราย) is a 1999 Thai action film written and directed by the Pang Brothers. Stylishly edited, the story of a deaf and mute hitman was the debut film for the twin-brother team of filmmakers. A 2008 remake of the same name starring Nicolas Cage was also directed by the Pangs.

== Plot ==
Kong is a deaf-mute gunman, an assassin for hire who can neither hear nor see his gunshots or victims. He receives his guidance through Aom, a stripper in Bangkok, who rides on his back and gives him directions. Because of his disability, he was taunted by other children and grows up into an angry young man.

At a target range, he finds he has a knack for target shooting when he visualizes the faces of the boys that taunted him in the target. His deafness gives him an edge in shooting, as he does not react to the gunshots.

One day while cleaning up, a customer named Joe is at the shooting range with his girlfriend, Aom. Joe notices Kong watching them and he offers the pistol to Kong, who impresses Joe and Aom with his shooting. Aom agrees to be Kong's partner and teaches him how to shoot, while riding behind him. When Joe injures his gun hand in a battle, Kong is ready to take on more work.

Working for a mob boss, Kong is sent on a job to Hong Kong and when he returns to Bangkok, he catches a cold and needs medicine, so he stops at a pharmacy and meets Fon, a pretty pharmacist, who he eventually takes out a few times. This encounter changes Kong's perspective on life as he realizes that life can be meaningful, even for a deaf-mute assassin like him.

Aom has trouble with one of the mob boss' henchmen. She spurns him, but he rapes her. Enraged, Joe kills the henchman, which brings the mob's wrath down on Joe, which in turn leads to more revenge killing by Kong, and a final big shoot-out in a water bottle plant. Severely injured in the battle and cornered by the police, Kong puts his head next to the mob boss's and then shoots himself in the head, killing the two of them.

== Cast ==
- Pawalit Mongkolpisit as Kong
- Premsinee Ratanasopha as Fon
- Patharawarin Timkul as Aom
- Pisek Intrakanchit as Joe

== Reception ==
On review aggregator Rotten Tomatoes, the film has an approval rating of 53% based on 38 reviews, with an average score of 5.5/10. Metacritic, which uses a weighted average, assigned the film a score of 45 out of 100, based on 12 critics, indicating "mixed or average" reviews.

== Awards and nominations ==
- 2000 Toronto International Film Festival - won the international critics' (FIPRESCI) Award
- 2001 International Film Festival Rotterdam - nominated for a Tiger Award.

== Remake ==
At the 2006 Cannes Film Festival, the Pang Brothers announced they would remake Bangkok Dangerous with Nicolas Cage in the lead role, though Cage's character would not be deaf/mute. With the working titles One Night in Bangkok and Time to Kill, shooting took place in Bangkok in August 2006, and the remake was released on September 5, 2008.

== See also ==
- List of films featuring the deaf and hard of hearing
- Pattiyal (2006), an Indian Tamil-language film, which was inspired from Bangkok Dangerous
