= Dang Bireley's and Young Gangsters =

Dang Bireley's and Young Gangsters (2499 Antapan Krong Muang)
- Theatrical release poster
- Thai: 2499 อันธพาลครองเมือง
- Directed by: Nonzee Nimibutr
- Written by: Wisit Sasanatieng
- Based on: Mafia Way by Suriyan Saktaisong
- Produced by: Visute Poolvoralaks
- Starring: Jessadaporn Pholdee; Noppachai Muttaweevong; Attaporn Teemakorn; Supakorn Kitsuwon; Chartchai Ngamsan; Apichart Choosakul; Champagne X
- Cinematography: Winai Patomboon
- Edited by: Sunit Ussavinikul
- Music by: Orange Music
- Distributed by: Tai Entertainment
- Release date: April 11, 1997
- Running time: 110 min
- Country: Thailand
- Language: Thai

Dang Bireley's and Young Gangsters (Thai: 2499 อันธพาลครองเมือง or 2499 Antapan Krong Muang; literally: 2499 Gangsters Rule the City) is a 1997 Thai epic biographical crime drama film directed by Nonzee Nimibutr. This film about young Thai gangsters in 1950s Thailand. Featuring John Woo-style heroic bloodshed, it was Nimibutr's debut film.

The 2499 in the Thai title refers to the year in the Buddhist calendar when the story starts, corresponding to the Gregorian year 1956.

== Plot ==
Dang, the son of a prostitute, growing up in 1950s Thailand, compensates for his inferiority complex by boosting up his ego. At the age of 13, he killed a man who was beating his mother. By age 16, he had dropped out of school and started his own protection racket. With his right-hand man Lam Sing, Dang is highly protective of Piak, and is also friends with Pu Bottle Bomb and Pu's sidekick Dum.

Dang attracts the attention of a young night club singer named Wallapa, who pressures Dang to stop being a gangster and live a normal life. Dang's mother also wishes that he would stop being a gangster and ordain as a Buddhist monk.

Dang carves out more territory by killing the local crime boss Mad Dog. Meanwhile, Piak is caught up in a fight between rival school gangs, instigated by Pu and Dum. The fight leads to a falling out between Dang and Pu the beginning of a feud between the two. Following a military coup all the gangsters must leave Bangkok for the countryside, Dang, Lam Sing and Piak go to work for Sergeant Chien, a former policeman turned gangster, at Chien's bar and gambling den next to an American military base. Chien needs more muscle to go against a rival operator, Headman Tek, and brings in Pu and Dum against Dang's wishes. Pu and Dum stir up trouble in the gambling den and reignite their feud with Dang's gang although Sergeant Chein tries to calm them. However Sergeant Chien is killed by a motorcyclist gunman and Pu and Dum go to work with his rival Headman Tek forcing Dang's gang out of the town.

Dang returns to Bangkok, where he plans on fulfilling his mother's wishes and taking his oath as a monk. However, Pu and Dum show up during the ceremony and gun battle ensues. Lam Sing is killed, and Dang and Piak are wounded, but Pu and Dum are killed.

In an epilogue, narrated by an older Piak, it is revealed that Dang survived his wounds, but continued life as a gangster seemingly unable to become a monk, and then died in a car accident at age 24, just like his idol James Dean.

== Cast ==
- Jessadaporn Pholdee as Dang, Dang Bireley
- Noppachai Muttaweevong as Lam Sing
- Attaporn Teemakorn as Piak, Piak Wisut Kasat
- Supakorn Kitsuwon as Pu, Pu the Bottle Bomb
- Chartchai Ngamsan as Dum, Dum Esso
- Champagne X as Wallapa
- Apichart Choosakul as Sergeant Chien
- Parichart Borsudhi as Dang's mother
- Piya Bunnak as Pol, Pol Trok Thawai
- Teerachai Plugpimarn as Mad Dog
- Suthakorn Jaimun as Headman Tek

== Popularity and the talk of the town ==
When the film was released, it quickly gained widespread popularity. It stood out from other Thai films of the time because of its realistic production and international-standard storytelling. The film is often credited with opening a new era in Thai cinema. Loosely based on Sen Tang Mafia (เส้นทางมาเฟีย, "Mafia Way"), a crime novel by Suriyan Saktaisong, the film features characters modeled after real people. Suriyan himself claimed to be Piak, one of Dang Bireley's close friends as portrayed in the film. However, individuals who actually knew Dang strongly disputed this claim. They insisted that they had never heard of Suriyan before and were certain he had never been part of Dang's circle. The film sparked considerable debate in Thai society, especially concerning the historical accuracy of its portrayal of Dang Bireley. Many people who claimed to have known him personally said that he did not have the kind of personality shown in the film. One example often cited is that Dang never drank alcohol. Like many teenagers of his era, he preferred milkshakes, which were very popular at the time. In addition, several scenes in the film were viewed as exaggerated. Many events depicted either did not happen at all or were not as violent or dramatic as the film suggested. While these dramatizations contributed to the film's cinematic appeal, they also raised questions about the balance between creative storytelling and factual representation.

Dang Bireley's and Young Gangsters was also praised as the debut work for many members of the production team including the director, screenwriter, and numerous members of the cast.

== Awards and nominations ==
The film won Best Picture and Best Director at the Thailand National Film Association Awards. At the 1997 Vancouver International Film Festival, it was nominated for a Dragons and Tigers award.

== Release ==
The film premiered on Friday, April 11, 1997.

It is back to screen again in 25 years on July 7, 2022 in the form of an outdoor cinema at Townspeople Plaza near the Giant Swing and the Bangkok City Hall in the project of Bangkok’s Anticipated Film Fest, that is a project of Bangkok Metropolitan Administration (BMA) by the governor Chadchart Sittipunt with outdoor film screenings (emphasis on Thai films) in different places, alternating with each other by Dang Bireley's and Young Gangsters being the first that started.

== Play ==
Dang Bireley's and Young Gangsters was adapted into a musical, performed from May 26 to June 29, 2025 at Muangthai Rachadalai Theatre, starring Naphat Siangsomboon as Dang Bireley, Paris Intarakomalyasut as Pu Bottle Bomb, Tate Henry Myron as Dum Esso, Narakorn Nichakulthanachot as Piak Wisut Kasat, Saharat Thiempan as Lam Sing, directed and produced by Takonkiet Viravan.
