= Jesdaporn Pholdee =

Thai actor, model, and presenter (born 1977)

- เจษฎาภรณ์ ผลดี
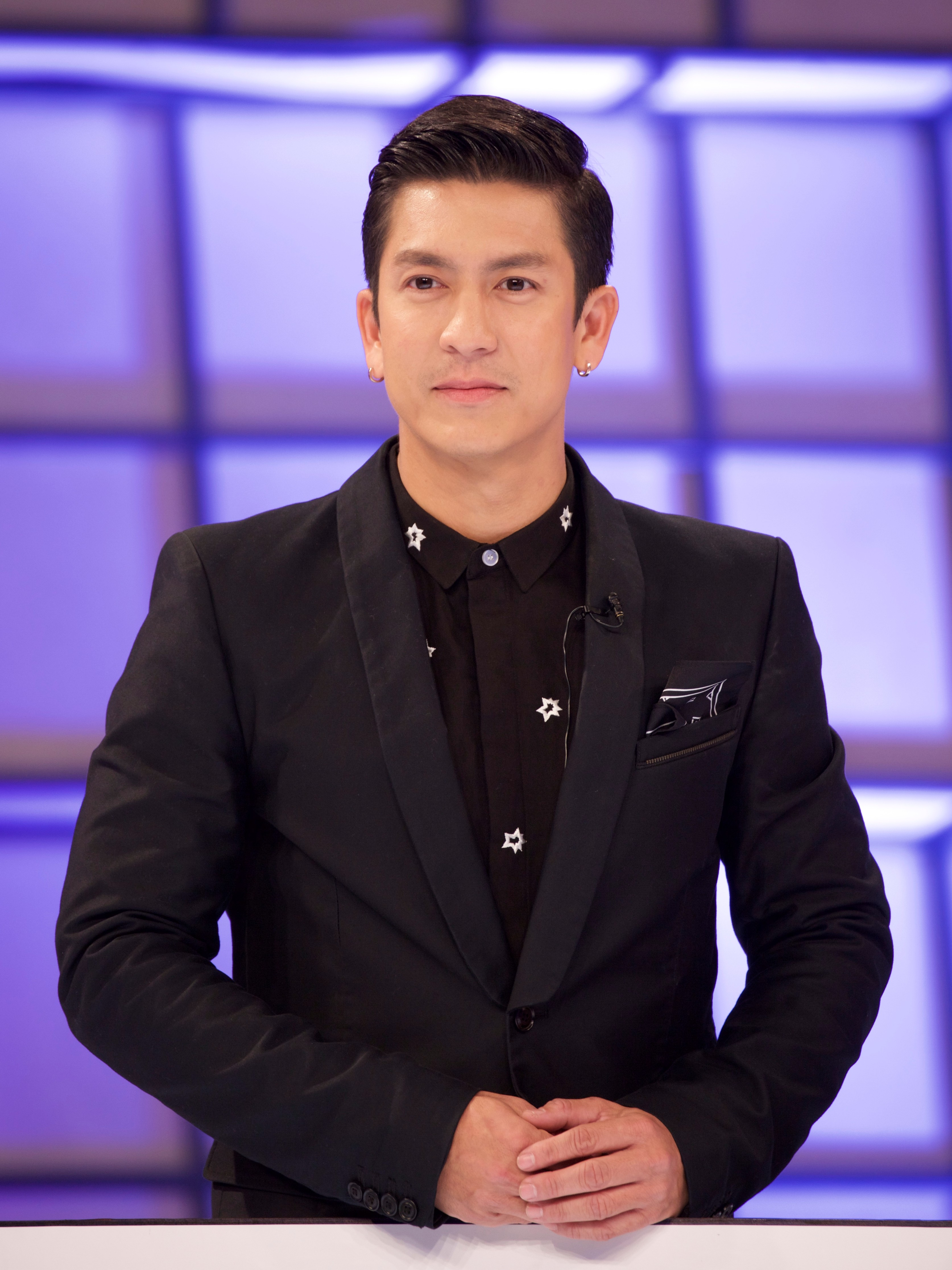
- Born: Jesdaporn Pholdee; June 5, 1977 (age 48); Bangkok, Thailand
- Other name: Tik
- Education: Bachelor's degree from the Industrial Department of the Faculty of Engineering at the University of the Thai Chamber of Commerce
- Occupations: Actor, TV Host, Presenter
- Years active: 1997–present
- Known for: Dang Bireley's and Young Gangsters; The Iron Ladies; Tawun Thud Burapah; Kaew Tah Pee; Prissana; Wanida; Forget Me Not
- Height: 1.70 m (5 ft 7 in)
- Spouse: Sittamon Pholdee (m. 2009)
- Children: 2
- Website: www.navigatortiktun.com

Jesdaporn Pholdee (Thai: เจษฎาภรณ์ ผลดี; RTGS: Chetsadaphon Phondi; born June 5, 1977, or nickname Tik (Thai: ติ๊ก)) is a Thai actor and presenter.

== Biography ==
=== Early life and education ===
Jesdaporn Pholdee is the eldest of three brothers; he has two younger brothers. His brother Pichetchai Pholdee is also actor. He completed his high school education at Yothinburana and graduated with a bachelor's degree from the Industrial Department of the Faculty of Engineering at the University of the Thai Chamber of Commerce. He was conferred an Honorary Degree of Doctor of Science in environmental science and natural resources from the Faculty of Science and Technology at Rajamangala University of Technology Phra Nakhon on December 16, 2014.

=== Career ===
Jesdaporn Pholdee entered the entertainment industry while he was studying at the university as a presenter for television commercials and in still pictures for advertisements before the director saw him in a studio and approached him to play the role of the leading male character in the movie Dang Bireley's and Young Gangsters that was historically successful both in terms of revenue and critique. It was regarded as the movie that sparked the popularity and comeback of Thai movies that were in the doldrums.

This was also his birth declaration. After that, he has continued to have his workmanship coming out such as fashion shooting, modeling, films, television dramas/ lakorns, and being a presenter for various brands of products.

=== Navigator ===
Apart from acting, Tik has also been the host and producer of the Navigator with, an ecotourism program on Channel 3 since 2005, and a guest speaker to talk about ecotourism in several academic establishments and organizations all these times. He and his program have received awards from a variety of institutions. Later on in 2014, Jesdaporn Pholdee was conferred an Honorary Degree of Science in environmental science and natural resources Doctorate from Rajamangala University of Technology.

=== Personal life ===
He is married (July 9, 2009).

== Filmography ==
=== Films ===
Year	Thai Title	English Title	Role	Notes	With
1997	2499 อันธพาลครองเมือง	Dang Bireley's and Young Gangsters	Dang Bireley	Lead Role	Champagne X
1997	คนป่วนสายฟ้า	Destiny Upside Down	Thaenkhun	Lead Role	Sonia Couling
1998	303 กลัว/กล้า /อาฆาต	303 Fear Faith Revenge	Prince Dowwaduang Sila	Guest Starring Role	
2000	สตรีเหล็ก	The Iron Ladies	Chai	Lead Role	Suchira Arunnaphiphat
2000	สตางค์	Satang	Rabue	Lead Role	Khemupsorn Sirisukha
2003	สตรีเหล็ก 2	The Iron Ladies 2	Chai	Lead Role	Suchira Arunnaphiphat
2003	คู่แท้ปาฏิหาริย์	The Whistle	Muton	Lead Role	Natthaweeranuch Thongmee
2004	คนเห็นผี 2	The Eye 2	Sam	Supporting Role	
2006	พระ เด็ก เสือ ไก่ วอก	The Magnificent Five	Suea	Lead Role	Paula Taylor
2008	ปืนใหญ่ จอมสลัด	Queens of Langkasuka	Prince Pahang	Supporting Role	Anna Ris
2008	ปาฏิหารย์รักต่างพันธุ์	Deep in the Jungle	Wint	Lead Role	Ploy Jindachote
2011		Shadowboxing 3: Last Round			
2012	รักฉันอย่าคิดถึงฉัน	I Miss You: If You Love Me, Don't Miss Me	Doctor Thana	Lead Role	Apinya Sakuljaroensuk, Natthaweeranuch Thongmee
2012	ยอดมนุษย์เงินเดือน	Super Salaryman	Pan	Lead Role	Natchalai Sukkamongkol

=== TV Dramas ===
Year	Thai Title	English Title	Title	Role	Network	Notes	With
1999	โซดา กับ ชาเย็น	Soda and Ice Tea	Soda Gub Cha Yen	Pattaya/Pattana	Channel 5	Lead Role	Kejmanee Pichaironnarongsongkram
2000	ปริศนา	Prissana	Prissana	Tun Chai Pote Preecha	Channel 7	Lead Role	Taya Rogers
2001	ตะวัน ตัด บูรพา	The Brothers	Tawun Thud Burapah	Burapah	Channel 5	Lead Role	Pimmada Boriruksuppapon
2001	วังวารี	Water Palace	Wang Waree	Phadon	Channel 3	Lead Role	Myria Benedetti
2002	ตกกระใด หัวใจพลอยโจน		Tok Kra Dai Hua Jai Ploy Jone	Cholchat	Channel 3	Lead Role	Kathaleeya McIntosh
2002	ร้อยเล่ห์ เสน่ห์ร้าย	100 Trickery's Dangerous Passion	Roy Leh Sanae Rai	Kongpope	Channel 5	Lead Role	Phiyada Akkraseranee
2003	เลือดขัตติยา	Destiny of a Princess	Luerd Kattiya	Anothai	Channel 5	Lead Role	Phiyada Akkraseranee
2004	นางสาวจริงใจกับนายแสนดี	Miss Sincere and Sir Good	Nang Sao Jing Jai Kub Nai San Dee	Sang Dee	Channel 7	Lead Role	Pachrapa Chaichua
2005	ฝันเฟื่อง	Impossible Dream	Fhun Fueng	Rattawee	Channel 5	Lead Role	Sopitnapa Chumpani
2006	ต่างฟ้าตะวันเดียว	Separate Sky, One Sun	Tang Fah Tawan Diew	Huto Heyman Tonnikan	Channel 3	Lead Role	Janie Tienphosuwan
2006	แก้วตาพี่	You are My Eyes	Kaew Tah Pee	Chisanu "Nu" Naresuan	Channel 3	Lead Role	Khemupsorn Sirisukha
2010	วนิดา	Wanida	Wanida	Major Prajak Mahasak (Yai)	Channel 3	Lead Role	Taksaorn Paksukcharern
2013	รักนี้ชั่วนิรันดร์	Autumn in My Heart	Autumn in My Heart	พาทิน	True Visions - Asian Series Channel	Lead Role	Sucharat Manaying
2014	อย่าลืมฉัน	Forget Me Not	Yah Leum Chan	Khemachad "Khem"	Channel 3	Lead Role	Ann Thongprasom
2015	เลือดมังกร: สิงห์	Dragons Blood - Singh	Luerd Mungkorn - Singh	Songkrod	Channel 3	Lead Role	Nittha Jirayungyurn
2016	เจ้าบ้าน เจ้าเรือน	Household Deity	Jao Ban Jao Ruen	Raiwin	Channel 3	Lead Role	Sririta Jensen
2016	เพลิงนรี	Lady of Fire	Plerng Naree	Pol.Gen. TheePob	Channel 3	Lead Role	Davika Hoorne
2016	เจ้าเวหา: ผู้ครองฟ้า	Sky Conqueror	Sky Masters Series	Commander Yothin	True4U (24) filming will start September 2016	Lead Role	Davika Hoorne
2018	คู่ซี้ผีมือปราบ	The Ghost Buster	Koo See Pee Meu Bprab	Lieutenant tie	Workpoint TV	Lead Role	
2018	ด้วยแรงอธิษฐาน	The Power of Prayer	Duay Rang Atitharn	Krit	Channel 3	Lead Role	Nittha Jirayungyurn
2020	ดั่งดวงหฤทัย	Like a Star in my Heart	Dung Duang Haruetai	King Rangsiymun	Channel 3	Lead Role	Kimberley Anne Woltemas
2020	XYZ	XYZ the Series		Ongkrak	True4U	Support Role	

=== TV Program Production ===
- Navigator An award-winning documentary and adventure travel TV program since 2005 that promotes nature conservation, ecotourism, and indigenous knowledge of the locals in spectacular countryside of Thailand.

== Awards and achievements ==
- Thailand Blockbuster Entertainment Award - Rising Star Award for Dang Bireley's and Young Gangsters (1997)
- Pasurataswadee Award for being a Good Role Model Against Drugs (2000)
- Honor Pin (Kemkrat)Award for being a Good Role Model Against Drugs (2001)from PM Gen. Chawalit Yongjaiyuth
- Thailand Esquire Award - Man At His Best Award 2001 - Actor Achievement Award by Esquire Magazine
- Selected to be the presenter for Thai Tourism between 2002 and 2004
- Star Entertainment Awards - Best Actor in the TV Series Tawan Tud Burapa (2002)
- Elle Style Awards - Hottest Style of the Year and Best Actor (2002)
- Sua Tong Kum (เสื้อทองคำ) Award 2002 - Thai Tailor Association from the Privy Councilor HE Gen. Pichitr Kullavanichaya
- Honor Pin received from Princess Ubol Rattana on International Anti-Drug Day June 26, 2002
- Petch Siam Awards 2002 from Chandrakasem Rajabhat University, Office of Art & Culture
- Sexiest Man of the Year Award: Durex Poll between years 2002 and 2005
- Top Award - Best Actor in the TV Series Roy Leh Saneh Rai (2002)
- Mekhala Awards 2004 - Best Actor from TV Series Ms jingjai and Mr Sandee
- Mekhala Vote Awards 2004 - Most Popular Actor
- Top Award - Best Actor in the TV Series Lued Kattiya (2003)
- Top Award - Best Actor in the TV Series Nangsao Jingjai Gub Nai Saandee (2004)
- Kom Chak Luek Award - Best Actor of 2006 for Kaew Tah Pee TV Series
- OK! Magazine Award 2007 - Female Heartthrob
- Dusit Poll - Dusit Rajabhat University's Countrywide Survey - Most Favourite Actor in 2001, 2002, 2003 and 2004
- ABAC Poll - Assumption University's Countrywide Survey - Most Favourite Actor 2006
- The Man whom woman wants to marry with the most Voted Award 2008 – SOHU.COM, China
- The Most Popular Actor 2008 – Sudsapda's Young & Smart 2008 Voted Awards
- The Hottest Couple - WE Magazine 2009
- Green Globe Award 2010 – Media Category, awarded by Petroleum Authority of Thailand (Navigator Program)
- SeeSun Bunthueng Awards 2010 - The Best Leading Actor of the Year
- The Most Popular Actor 2010 - Sudsapda's Young & Smart 2010 Voted Awards
- 8th Kom Chad Luk Awards – The Most Popular Actor 2010
- TV Pool Top Awards – The Best Actor 2010
- 25th Golden Television Awards - The Leading Actor of Distinction 2010
- 4th Rakangthong (Golden Bell) Awards 2011 – awarded by Broadcaster and Journalist's Assembly of Thailand (BJ.AT) for being the role model in social responsibility/ contributions/ good deeds, following the King's footsteps, given by the acting Buddhist Supreme Patriarch (Sangharaja) and H.E. Air Chief Marshal Kamthon Sindhavanon - a Privy Councillor (appointed advisor to His Majesty The King)
- The Most Popular Show Host – Sudsapda's Young & Smart 2011 Voted Awards (from Navigator program)
- 2012 Phra Kinnaree Award - awarded by Broadcaster and Journalist's Assembly of Thailand (BJ.AT) awarded for being the role model in social responsibility/ contributions/ good deeds, following the King's footsteps, given by His Excellency Kamthon Sindhavanon, the former Air Chief Marshal and currently one of His Majesty's Privy Councillors
- 2012 Male Hot Stuff Award – OK! Magazine (Thailand)
- 2014 SIAM DARA STARS AWARDS - Best Actor from “Forget Me Not”
- 2014 Male Hot Stuff Award – OK! Magazine (Thailand)
- 2015 Male Hot Stuff Award - OK! Magazine (Thailand)
- 2016 Parent of the Year – “The Best Role Model Parents” - The Pholdees: Tik & Peach, awarded by Amarin Baby & Kids magazine
- 2016 Father of the Year – “The Best Role Model Father” awarded by Amarin Baby & Kids magazine
- 2016 No. 1 on Suandusitpoll "The Most Famous Actor"
