= Nonzee Nimibutr =

Thai film director, film producer, and screenwriter (born 1962)

- นนทรีย์ นิมิบุตร
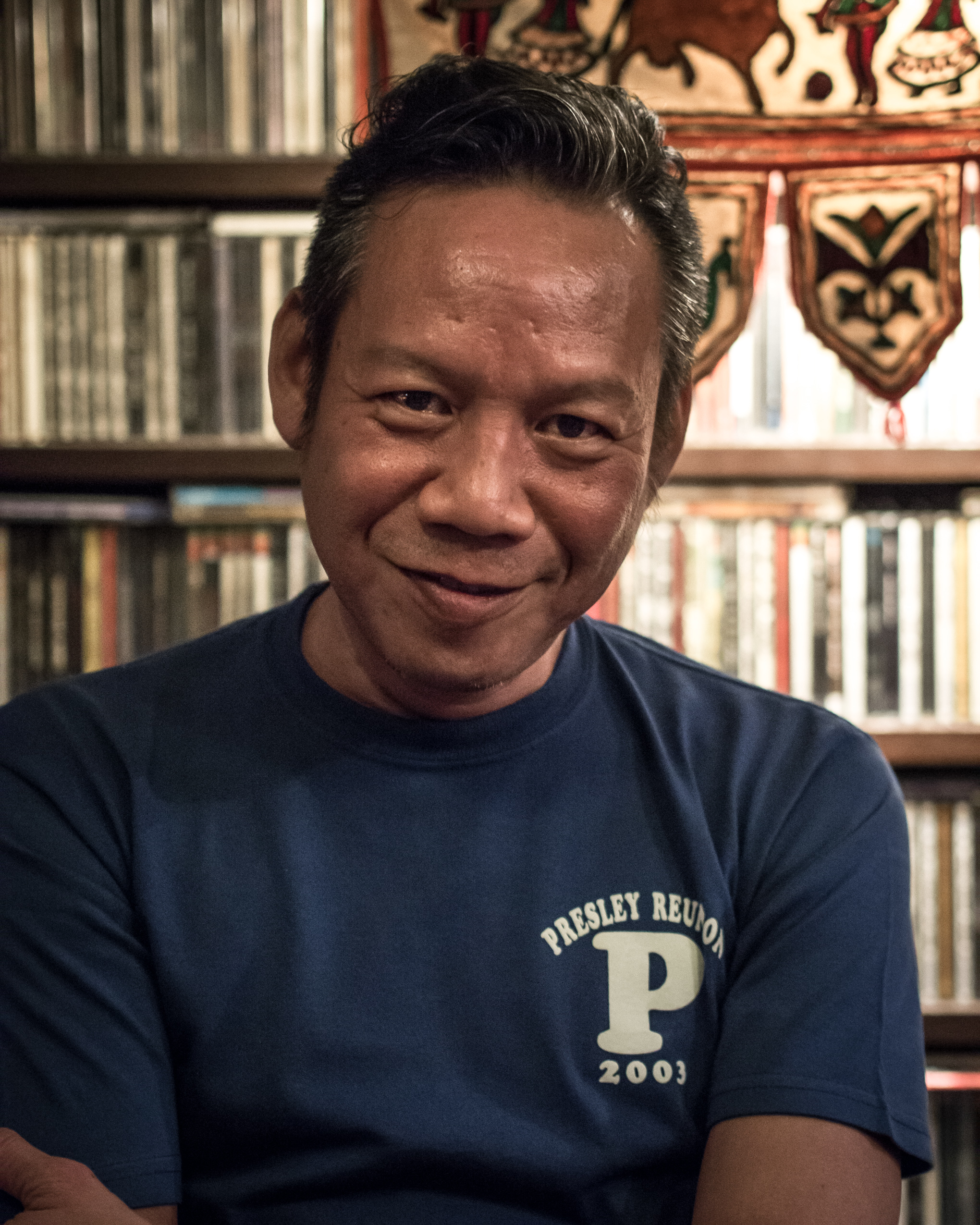
- Nonzee in Chiang Mai (2014)
- Born: 18 December 1962 (age 63); Nonthaburi, Thailand
- Education: Silpakorn University
- Occupations: Film director; screenwriter; film producer
- Notable work: Dang Bireley's and Young Gangsters; Nang Nak; Jan Dara

Nonzee Nimibutr (Thai: นนทรีย์ นิมิบุตร, RTGS: Nonsi Nimibut; Born: 18 December 1962) is a Thai film director, film producer and screenwriter. Best known for his ghost thriller, Nang Nak, he is generally credited as the leader among a "New Wave" of Thai filmmakers that also includes Pen-Ek Ratanaruang, Wisit Sasanatieng and Apichatpong Weerasethakul.

== Biography ==
=== Education ===
Nonzee is a relative of Lieutenant General Phachoen Nimitbutr (เผชิญ นิมิบุตร), Director of the Signal Department of the Royal Thai Army and the founder of Thailand's first television station, Army TV Channel 5. Nonzee graduated with a Bachelor of Arts in visual communication design from the Faculty of Decorative Arts at Silpakorn University in 1987. Classmates included Wisit Sasanatieng and production designer Ek Iemchuen. He started his career as a director of television commercials and music videos.

=== First films ===
He made his feature-film debut with 1997's Dang Bireley's and Young Gangsters, with a screenplay by Wisit Sasanatieng. The story was set in 1956 in Bangkok and follows the adventures of a gang of young criminals, with the action showing the influence of John Woo films. It was named best picture at the Thailand National Film Awards and was nominated for a Dragons and Tigers Award at the Vancouver International Film Festival.

His next film was Nang Nak, a thriller based on a popular Thai ghost story, also scripted by Wisit. A famous ghost story that has been depicted in many Thai films and television series, the story is about a husband comes home from war and takes up living with his wife and newborn son who, unbeknownst to him, have died while he was away. The moodily framed horror film won numerous awards, including best picture at the Thailand National Film Awards.

Both Young Gangsters and Nang Nak were hits at the box office and were credited with reinvigorating the Thai film industry.

=== Pan-Asian production ===
With his third film, Jan Dara, Nonzee began a trend of pan-Asian film production in the Thai industry, bringing in Hong Kong actress Christy Chung to star in the erotic drama. He also sought funding from studios outside Thailand.

Ahead of its release, Jan Dara was controversial because its sexual subject matter, involving incest, rape and abortion, tested the bounds of Thailand's 1930 Censorship Code. The film was released with the board's cuts for the film's commercial run in Thailand, but it was available uncut for film festivals.

Nonzee also became quite active as a producer, putting his name on such films as Bangkok Dangerous by the Pang Brothers; Tears of the Black Tiger by Wisit Sasanatieng; the historical battle epic, Bangrajan by Thanit Jitnukul and Pen-Ek Ratanaruang's Monrak Transistor.

He co-founded his own production company, Cinemasia, with his production partner, Duangkamol Limcharoen. She died in 2003.

Continuing on his path of pan-Asian production, Nonzee initiated the horror trilogy, Three, in which he and two other directors, Hong Kong's Peter Chan and Korean director Kim Ji-Woon, each directed a segment.

=== Recent work ===
While keeping busy as a producer, he directed 2003's OK Baytong, a topical, contemporary drama about a young man who must leave the Buddhist monkhood and go to Muslim-dominated southern Thailand to attend to the affairs of his sister, who was killed in a train bombing.

In 2005, he directed a short film, The Ceiling for the Asian Film Academy, in conjunction with the Pusan International Film Festival. The 18-minute, English-language film starring South Korean actors is the story of a young writer who climbs into the crawlspace above her apartment and spies on the woman living next door.

His next film, Queens of Langkasuka, is an epic historical-fantasy involving pirates and three princesses who must protect their realm, Langkasuka. The film was originally to be called Queens of Pattani, but the name was changed to avoid possible political overtones stemming from the South Thailand insurgency and Pattani separatism. Shooting began in August 2006. The film stars Jarunee Suksawat, Ananda Everingham from Shutter, Dan Chupong from Kerd ma lui, Jesdaporn Pholdee, Winai Kraibutr and Sorapong Chatree.

Another film mentioned as being in development by Nonzee is a ghost thriller, Toyol, a Singaporean co-production about a pair of Hong Kong children who move with their father to Bangkok and are introduced to a stepmother they do not like, in a house that has some problems, namely, the toyol.

He has also produced Noo Hin: The Movie, a live-action adaptation of the popular Thai comic book (or manga) by Padung Kraisri, about a plucky Isan woman who works as a maid in a middle class urban Thai home.

In 2008, Nonzee became the fifth filmmaker to be honored with the Thailand Culture Ministry's Silpathorn Award, an honor previously bestowed on Pen-ek Ratanaruang, Apichatpong Weerasethakul, Wisit Sasanatieng and Thunska Pansittivorakul.

== Filmography ==
=== Director ===
- Dang Bireley's and Young Gangsters (2499 Antapan Krong Muang) (1997)
- Nang Nak (1999)
- Jan Dara (2001)
- Three, segment San Geng (The Wheel) (2002)
- OK Baytong (2003)
- The Ceiling (2005) (short film)
- Queens of Langkasuka (2008)
- Distortion (2012)
- Timeline (2014)
- The Gift (2017)
- Once Upon A Star (2023) (Netflix film)
- Tee Yai: Born to Be Bad (2025) (Netflix film)

=== Producer ===
- Bangkok Dangerous (1999)
- Tears of the Black Tiger (Fah Talai Jone) (2000) (producer)
- Bang Rajan (2000)
- Jan Dara (2001)
- Monrak Transistor (Transistor Love Story) (2001)
- Three, segment San Geng (The Wheel) (2002)
- Last Life in the Universe (Ruang Rak Noi Nid Mahasan (2003)
- The Letter (Jod Mai Rak) (2004)
- The Overture (Hom Rong) (2004)
- The Eye 2 (Jian Gui 2 (2004)
- Noo Hin: The Movie (2006)
- Queen of Langkasuka (2008)
- Pro May (Atchariyah Tong Sang) (2019)
- Nemesis (Kuen Yuttitum) (2020)
- The Cursed Land (Dan Sap) (2024)
