= List of Indonesian women writers =

This is a list of women writers who were born in Indonesia or whose writings are closely associated with that country.

== A ==
- Asmirandah (born 1989), actress, short story writer
- Sekar Ayu Asmara (active since 2001), songwriter, screenwriter, film director
- Boni Avibus (born 2002), playwright, poet, actress
- Djenar Maesa Ayu (born 1973), novelist, short story writer, screenwriter, filmmaker

== B ==
- Fira Basuki (born 1972), novelist

== C ==
- Linda Christanty (born 1970), short story writer, essayist, journalist
- Leila Chudori (born 1962), short story writer, novelist, scriptwriter
- Rain Chudori (born 1994), short story writer, actress

== D ==
- Herawati Diah (1917–2016), journalist

== E ==
- Alberthiene Endah (active since 1993), biographer, novelist, journalist

== F ==
- Lily Yulianti Farid (born 1971), short story writer, journalist

== H ==
- Ratih Hardjono (born 1960), journalist, non-fiction writer
- Toeti Heraty (1933–2021), poet, academic
- Stefani Hid (born 1985), novelist, short story writer, columnist

== K ==
- Marianne Katoppo (1943–2007), novelist, theologian
- Rohana Kudus (1884–1972), first female Indonesian journalist

== L ==
- Dewi Lestari (born 1976), novelist, singer, songwriter

== M ==
- Okky Madasari (born 1984), novelist

== N ==
- Clara Ng (born 1973), novelist, short story writer, children's writer

== P ==
- Laksmi Pamuntjak (born 1971), poet, novelist, essayist, food writer
- Intan Paramaditha (born 1979), novelist, short story writer, academic
- Pipiet Senja (pen name of Etty Hadiwati Arief, 1957–2025), novelist, poet, short story writer

== R ==
- Hanna Rambe (born 1940), journalist, novelist, biographer
- Helvy Tiana Rosa (born 1970), playwright, short story writer
- Siti Rukiah (1927–1996), poet, novelist
- Prima Rusdi (born 1967), screenwriter, short story writer
- Oka Rusmini (born 1967), poet, novelist

== S ==
- Titie Said (1935–2011), novelist, journalist, editor
- Ratna Sarumpaet (1949), dramatist
- Sariamin Ismail (1909–1995), novelist and educator active under the penname Selasih
- Myra Sidharta (born 1927), literary scholar, columnist, autobiographer
- Sugiarti Siswati (died May 1987), short story writer
- Julia Suryakusuma (born 1954), journalist, non-fiction writer
- Astrid Susanto (1936–2006), politician, non-fiction writer, educator
- Madelon Szekely-Lulofs (1899–1958), novelist, journalist

== T ==
- Marga T (1943–2023), romance writer, children's writer
- Totilawati Tjitrawasita (1945–1982), journalist, short story writer
- S. K. Trimurti (1912–2008), journalist, political activist

== U ==
- Ucu Agustin (born 1976), journalist, documentary filmmaker
- Ayu Utami (born 1968), novelist, short story writer

== W ==
- Mira W. (born 1951), novelist, screenwriter
