= Un Soir du Paris =

Lesbian-themed short story collection

- Author: Various
- Cover artist: Mulyono
- Language: Indonesian
- Subject: Lesbianism
- Genre: Short story anthology
- Publisher: Gramedia Pustaka Utama
- Publication date: 2010
- Publication place: Indonesia
- Pages: 127
- ISBN: 978-979-22-6208-7

Un Soir du Paris (An Evening in Paris) is a lesbian-themed short story collection compiled by SepociKopi.com and published in 2010 by Gramedia Pustaka Utama. It consists of twelve short stories collected over a three-year period from several publications. The first Indonesian short story collection dealing with lesbianism, it received mixed reception.

== Background ==
In Indonesia, few works have been written dealing with lesbianism. To address that, beginning in August 2007 the LGBT website SepociKopi.com began collecting short stories published up to ten years previously with a lesbian theme, both those published in mass media and those published in individual short story anthologies. These works were first republished on the website. Several of the authors published in the anthology had previously written works dealing with lesbianism, including Clara Ng with her novel Gerhana Kembar (Twin Eclipses; 2007) and Linda Christanty with her short story "Mercusuar" ("Lighthouse").

== Contents ==
Un Soir du Paris consists of 12 short stories. It is preceded by a foreword by Balinese writer Oka Rusmini, who had previously published two novels dealing with lesbianism: Tarian Bumi (Dance of the Earth; 2000) and Tempurung (Shell; 2010).

=== Cahaya Sunyi Ibu ===
Rafli, in a letter to his sister Rosa, writes of his aging mother's love affair with an elderly Jewish woman named Caroline, who is her roommate in a nursing home in the United States. The women, as well as several other residents, are attempting to escape the nursing home as they consider the conditions inhumane. Caroline and the mother spend long hours in the garden discussing it. When Caroline dies, the mother and other residents plan to make their escape to the beach. In his closing remarks, Rafli writes that he intends to join them to better understand his mother.

"Cahaya Sunyi dari Ibu" ("A Silent Light from Mother") was written by Triyanto Triwikromo in Los Angeles and Semarang in 2007. It was originally published in Jawa Pos on 21 October 2007. Rusmini wrote that the story required further polishing, to make it more than a simple melancholic love story. Dalih Sembiring, writing for The Jakarta Globe, wrote that the story had an interesting premise but was "sometimes mired in over-the-top poetic language."

=== Danau ===
An unnamed female narrator, part of a guerrilla campaign which dumps bodies in a lake reported to be haunted, admires a woman from afar. The narrator stalks her, takes a picture from her bedroom, and ultimately meets her. The two become friends, but the narrator hides her guerrilla lifestyle. Although both are romantically interested in each other, they decide to not pursue a relationship due to society's disapproval of lesbianism.

"Danau" ("Lake") was written by Linda Christanty and originally published in Pantau magazine in December 2003. Rusmini wrote that the story required further polishing, to make it more than a simple melancholic love story. Sembiring wrote that the story felt as if it were "treading water", but still compelling.

=== Dua Perempuan dengan HP-nya ===
Two working women, fresh from the office, go to the beach and sit in a convertible, holding hands while talking on their cell phones. Sandra, in a blazer and miniskirt, talks to her maid and ensures that her children and husband are properly taken care of, as she will come home late. Susan, in a blazer and pants, aggressively tells her husband's secretary that she cannot make a meeting, while accusing the secretary of having an affair. When their conversations are over, the women begin kissing passionately and, when their cell phones ring, reach into their blazers to turn off the phones.

"Dua Perempuan dengan HP-nya" ("Two Women and Their Cell Phones") was written by Seno Gumira Ajidarma in Jakarta on 18 August 1997. It was originally published in Koran Tempo on 1 April 2001. Rusmini wrote that the subject matter, of heterosexual matters disturbing a lesbian relationship, was indeed common, and that the story would have been more interesting had Ajidarma provided a way for the two unnamed lovers to further their relationship. Sembiring wrote that the story left the reader with a sense of liberation, and both main characters were comfortable with their sexual orientation.

=== Hari Ini, Esok, dan Kemarin ===
An unnamed housewife grows tired of the daily routine at her home, and dissatisfied with her husband. She becomes romantically involved with Elena, and over several months the two make plans for the future. The housewife ultimately decides to tell her husband that she is a lesbian and leave him for Elena. She prepares her husband's favourite meal to ease the blow. However, when her husband comes home she finds herself unable to destroy their relationship.

"Hari Ini, Esok, dan Kemarin" ("Today, Tomorrow, and Yesterday") was written by Maggie Tiojakin. Rusmini noted that the story had a similar theme to "Dua Perempuan dengan HP-nya", that the main character felt like she was a deviant due to marrying a man. Sembiring wrote that the story had a "suspenseful, foreboding mood".

=== Lelaki yang Menetas di Tubuhku ===
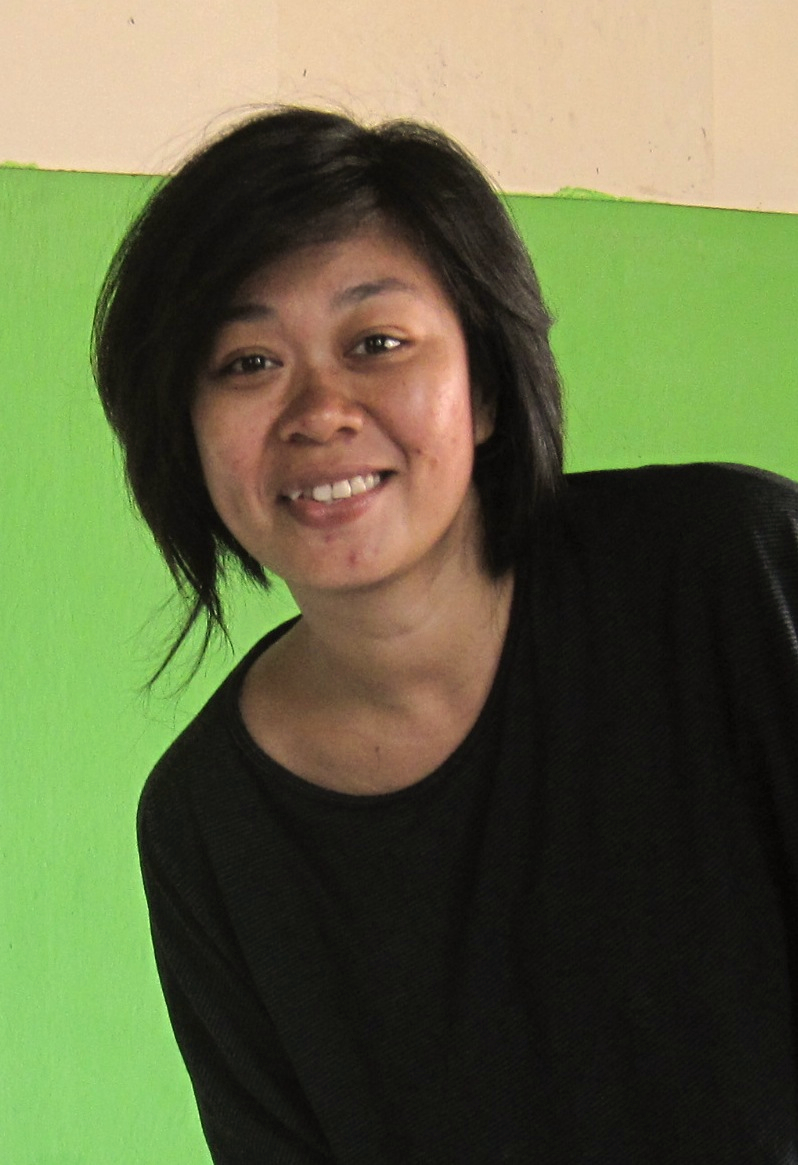
Ucu Agustin, writer of "Lelaki yang Menetas di Tubuhku"

An unnamed narrator recalls how she became a lesbian. At the age of eight, when attending a party for adults and in search of a bathroom, she stumbled across a dark room where two women were kissing passionately. Since then, she felt as if she were physically a woman but had a man inside her. She entered a three-year relationship with a woman named Devina, who was impregnated then left by her boyfriend. Afterwards she enters into several more relationships, openly admitting her lesbianism, but finds herself branded a deviant.

"Lelaki yang Menetas di Tubuhku" ("The Man Who Hatched in My Body") was written by Ucu Agustin on 19 February 2006. It was originally published in Jawa Pos on 13 August 2006. Rusmini wrote that the story had an interesting premise, but the faltering use of language and rushed feel of the story led to it not fulfilling its potential. Sembiring wrote that the story had sharp focus and was one of the stronger ones in the collection.

=== Mata Indah ===
A pair of sisters, Lei and Lea, are mutually jealous of each other. The elder, uglier sister Lei is jealous of her sister's looks and voice; Lea is jealous of Lei's eyes, which are bright and shining as opposed to her dull grey ones. After years of hating each other, one day they kill each other and steal what they most desire: Lei rips out Lea's throat and takes her voice, while Lea gouges out Lei's eyes and uses them herself. Their mother, full of sorrow, preserves them and puts them in separate areas of the house, Lei in the basement and Lea in the attic. Still aware, the sisters watch as years pass and everyone dies. When a young couple comes to look at the house, Lei thinks smugly that she will finally be able to attract a man with her lovely voice, while Lea will only be able to look wishfully at the women she desires.

"Mata Indah" ("Beautiful Eyes") was written by Clara Ng and originally published in Koran Tempo on 17 June 2007. Rusmini wrote that the story showed Ng's storytelling skills, packaging a simple theme as if it were a fairy tale by Hans Christian Andersen, with a twist that the beautiful sister, who has many male suitors, is a lesbian. Sembiring described the story as being "tinged with darkness and symbols" of hatred in society.

=== Menulis Langit ===
Dayu is a young girl who enjoys writing. When her teacher is impressed by her writing, Dayu writes increasingly complex sentences. She describes a beautiful angel, who she thinks will visit her in her sleep. As her development is much greater than that of her classmates, Dayu is sent to first grade; the teacher helps Dayu develop her writing skills further, and Dayu says that one day she wants to write on the sky. By university, Dayu is able to do so, colouring the clouds grey and causing rain. One day, after writing "Welcome to the wonderful world of homosexuality!" in the sky, the angel visits Dayu. She asks why Dayu writes on the sky; Dayu says it is for the angel. This response is cut short when the angel kisses Dayu on the lips.

"Menulis Langit" ("The Sky Scribbler") was written by Abmi Handayani and originally published (in English) in The Jakarta Post on 1 June 2008. Rusmini wrote that the story had an interesting idea, but required more eroticism to be more effective. Sembiring described the story as having a whimsical tone, which he felt gave it greater excitement.

=== Potongan-Potongan Cerita di Kartu Pos ===
The narrator receives numerous postcards from Agus Noor, detailing the story of Maiya. Maiya bought a necklace consisting of beads made of tears, then showed it off to her friends Mulan and Andien. As Maiya continued to show off her necklace, Andien whispered to Mulan that Maiya's husband Dhani was having an affair. When sleeping one night, Maiya heard sobs coming from her necklace; this did not abate for several days. With the help of Andien, with whom she had been secretly having an affair, she tracked down the village from which the necklace originated and discovered that it was made of crystallised tears; the villagers had cried so much that the tears could no longer flow as water. Upon returning home, Maiya cried her own crystallised tears. The narrator, revealed to be Dhani, gives a necklace enclosed with the postcards to his lover, Mulan; the necklace was said to be made from Maiya's tears.

"Potongan-Potongan Cerita di Kartu Pos" ("Story Fragments on Postcards") was written by Agus Noor in Jakarta in 2006. It was originally published in his short story collection of the same title in 2006. Rusmini wrote that the story required further polishing, to make it more than a simple melancholic love story. Sembiring opined that the plot was well crafted, with a mixture of "subtle lesbian elements" which made the "unique and symbolic narrative come full circle."

=== Saga ===
Wan returns to her home and her husband, Erald, after spending the day with her lesbian lover Aini. Having married Erald not for love, but to please her family after her village discovered that she and another girl were in a relationship, Wan finds her relationship with Aini much more fulfilling. Erald, an abusive drunk who often listens to hard rock until the early hours of the morning, believes that Aini and his wife are just friends and allows them to meet freely. After spending a day with Aini, Wan comes home, where Erald forces himself upon her. Wan smiles through her tears, finding strength in her thoughts of Aini.

"Saga" was written by Shantined in February 2008. It was originally published in the magazine Jurnal Perempuan in May of that year. Rusmini wrote that the story required further polishing, to make it more than a simple melancholic love story. Sembiring considered the story sub-par.

=== Sebilah Pisau Roti ===
An unnamed narrator and her unnamed friend are fighting. The narrator has fallen in love with her friend, but this is not received. The friend is unable to accept that she is loved by another woman. She takes out a knife and threatens to kill herself, but is calmed by the narrator. After the friend goes to sleep, the narrator – recalling how she had discussed this relationship with another friend, and how society applied a double standard to love affairs between homosexual and heterosexual couples – goes to the bedroom, lies beside her friend, and plunges the knife into her chest.

"Sebilah Pisau Roti" ("A Bread Knife") was written by Cok Sawitri and originally published in Kompas on 28 October 2001. Rusmini wrote that the story required further polishing, to make it more than a simple melancholic love story. Sembiring considered the story sub-par.

=== Tahi Lalat di Punggung Istriku ===
A married businessman loves the mole on his wife's back. In their twenty years of marriage, he has made it a habit to kiss the mole every day and even ejaculate on it after sexual intercourse with his wife; the only time he has almost been unfaithful was when a prostitute had a similar mole. One day, he comes home and cannot find it on her body; she says that she has never had a mole. After several days of looking for and asking about it, he becomes depressed and refuses to touch his wife; he eventually locates the prostitute he had refused before and has sex with her. At her massage, his wife talks to her masseuse and reveals that she had had the mole removed by laser as she wanted her husband's attention; the masseuse, who had mentioned the technique, holds her tight and says that she is still there.

"Tahi Lalat di Punggung Istriku" ("The Mole on My Wife's Back") was written by Ratih Kumala and originally published in her short story anthology Larutan Senja (Dusk's Solution; 2006). Rusmini wrote that the story required further polishing, to make it more than a simple melancholic love story. Sembiring opined that the story had a well-crafted plot and interesting twist, that the wife was involved in a lesbian relationship; however, he noted that the twist would have been more powerful if the story were not already in a lesbian-themed book.

=== Un Soir du Paris ===
An unnamed female narrator meets with a person in the streets of Paris and asks to kiss that person. They kiss, slowly at first but soon passionately, ignoring passersby and a sudden downpour. When they part ways, the narrator recalls that she had dated this person, Loui, until Loui's parents caught them having sexual intercourse. Loui was put in a mental hospital and the narrator forced to leave the area; the narrator had intended to jog Loui's memory with the kiss, but failed. In the final passage, it is revealed that Loui's name is Louisa.

"Un Soir du Paris" ("An Evening in Paris") was written by Stefanny Irawan on 17 December 2006. It was originally published in Media Indonesia on 22 April 2007. Rusmini wrote that the story required further polishing, to make it more than a simple melancholic love story. Sembiring wrote that the work's tone, conflict and execution made it "unforgettable".

== Release and reception ==
Un Soir du Paris was published by Gramedia Pustaka Utama on 9 September 2010. It was the first lesbian-themed short story collection in Indonesia.

In her foreword, Rusmini wrote that none of the stories had a "bite" or made her "quiver" when reading them; (Note: Original: "... tak ada yang menggigit dan membuat saya menggigil ketika membaca cerpen-cerpen ini ...") she wrote that it would have been better had more writers dealt with psychological issues faced by lesbian women in a repressive society. Sembiring found the quality of the stories collected to be uneven. He noted that several were well-developed, while others "never seem to get off the emotional launch pad"; he expressed hope that the collection would lead to further such-themed works. Dewi Lestari, as quoted in Media Indonesia, described the collection as "not only extraordinary, but unusual" (Note: Original: "... bukan hanya luar biasa, tapi juga tidak biasa ...") and proof that love can strike whomever, no matter their orientation.
