= Zakaria Ariffin =

Malaysian playwright, theatre director and educator (1952–2025)

- زکريا عارفين
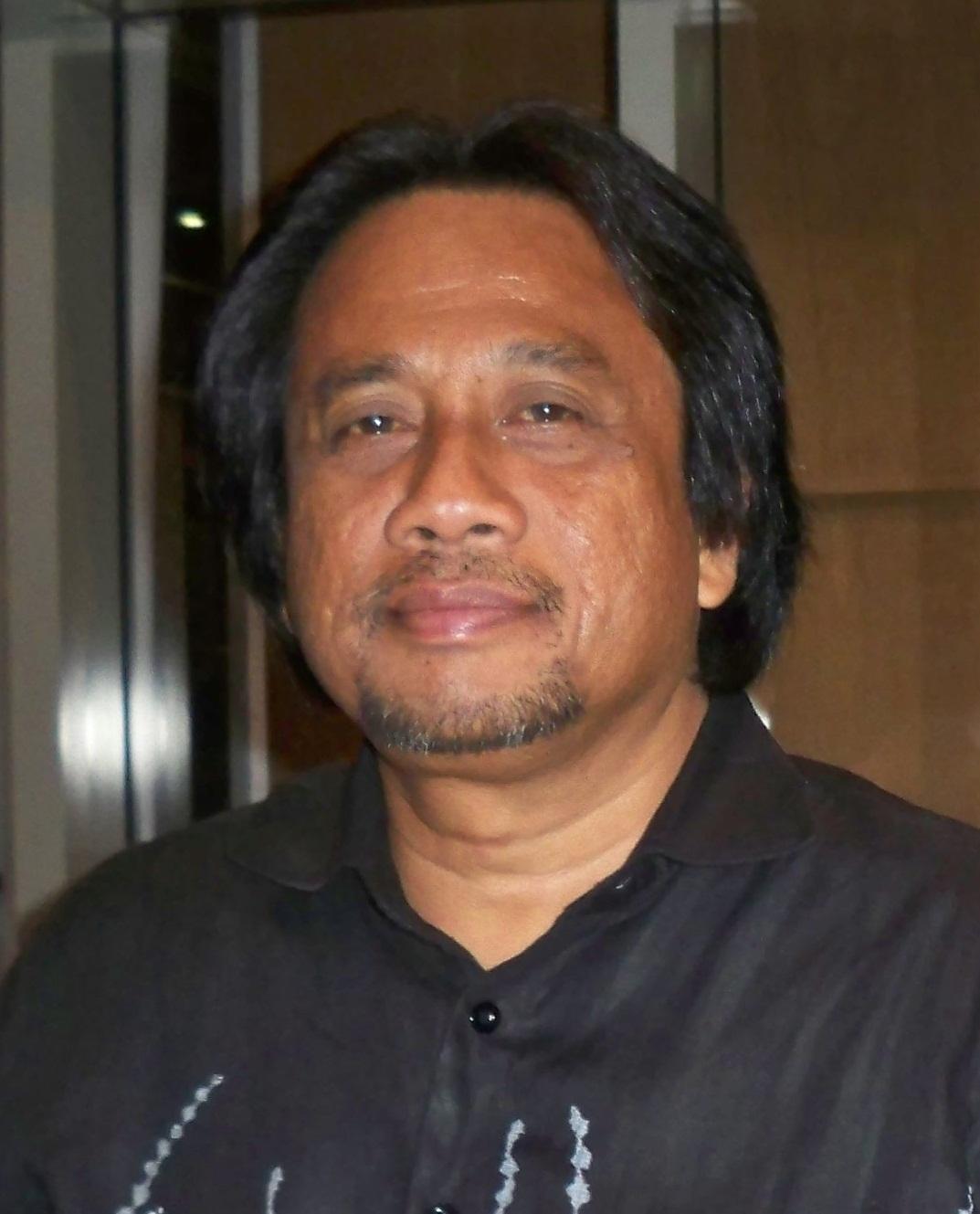
- Ariffin in 2013
- Born: Zakaria bin Ariffin; 22 July 1952; Kuantan, Pahang, Federation of Malaya
- Died: 19 February 2025 (aged 72); Slim River, Perak, Malaysia
- Citizenship: Malaysia
- Education: University of Science, Malaysia
- Occupations: Playwright, director, theatre critic
- Writing career
- Language: Malay
- Years active: 1970s–2025
- Period: 1975–1978
- Genre: Plays
- Notable awards: Esso-Gapen II Prize (1988–89); Literary Prize of Malaysia (1988–89); Award "Seri Angkasa" of Radio and Television of Malaysia (1988–89); S.E.A. Write Award (2001); Literary Prize of Johor (2007); State prize in the field of art (in the nomination for individual achievements, 2009)

Zakaria Ariffin (22 July 1952 – 19 February 2025) was a Malaysian playwright, theatre director and educator.

== Life and career ==
Ariffin was born at Kuantan, where he graduated from high school. In 1974, he entered the Paedagogical College of Sultan Idris in Tanjung Malim, but only studied there for five months. However, during that time, Ariffin was acquainted with the playwright Noordin Hassan, who liked how he staged his play The Door. In 1975, on the advice of the master, he entered the Faculty of Performing Arts at the University of Science in Penang. His teachers were well-known theatre-makers and directors, Kala Devata (Mustafa Kamil Yasin), Ghulam Sarwar, Gus Nasaruddin, Krishen Jeet, and Zainal Latif. At the same time, he took an active part in Penang's theatrical group, Angkatan Sasaran, both as an actor and as a stage director. He began writing and staging his plays, starting with Penunggu Warisan, in 1977.

After graduating from the university in 1978, he started work in the department of literature of The Institute of Language and Literature of Malaysia (DBP), where he had the opportunity to communicate with well-known writers, such as Usman Awang, Osman Zainuddin, Johan bin Jaafar, Atondra, and Malina Manjoy. Ariffin joined the theatrical company of the DBP "Anak Alam" and played in such productions as Hunchback from Tanjung Putri by Shahrom Hussein, Visitors at Kenny Hill by Usman Awang, Hatta Azad Khan's Seven corpses and statues, and Where the Moon Always Cracks from A. Samad Said. Along with this, he continued to write plays himself: The Opera House (1978), The King of the Fools (1993), Do Not Kill Sam (1994), The Woman of the English Lieutenant (1995). These were mostly of protest and satirical character with elements of Malay opera (bangsawan). Some of his plays attracted the attention of Central Television (e.g. If you are not lucky, you will not get lucky). The cooperation with Noordin Hassan continued; in particular, in 1994 he took part in staging his play, This night the tortoise cried.

In 1996, he moved to the National Academy of Arts as a lecturer, where he soon headed the theatre department. There he staged his new plays This is not the end (1996), Teja (1997), Imam (1998), and also, with the support of the Ministry of Culture, large-scale productions of the old ones — The Opera House (1988), King of the fools (1997), Siti Zubaidah (2000) — on the stage of the prestigious Palace of Culture in Kuala Lumpur. In 2001, he initiated the wayang (traditional puppet theatre) Nusantara Festival, held in Kuala Lumpur. In 2007, he published the play Kesuma, which resonated widely in theatre circles. In 1997, he participated in the international writing programme at Iowa University (USA).

As a theatre critic, Ariffin published the books, Modern Malay Drama in Essays (1981) and The Drama of Three Epochs (1984).

Ariffin died of stroke on 19 February 2025, at the age of 72.

== Awards ==
- Esso-Gapen II Prize (1988–89)
- Literary Prize of Malaysia (1988–89)
- Award "Seri Angkasa" of Radio and Television of Malaysia (1988–89)
- S.E.A. Write Award (2001)
- Literary Prize of Johor (2007)
- State prize in the field of art (in the nomination for individual achievements, 2009)

== Selected works ==
- Indahnya pelangi. Iustrasi [With illustrations by] Ibrahim Md. Said. Kuala Lumpur: Dewan Bahasa dan Pustaka, 1985.
- Samad Ismail. Kuala Lumpur: Dewan Bahasa dan Pustaka, 1991 (совместно с др.)
- Usman Awang. Kuala Lumpur: Dewan Bahasa dan Pustaka, 1991 (совместно с др.)
- Biografi seniman negara Rahman B. Kuala Lumpur: Sierra Focus Sdn. Bhd., 2005

=== As editor ===
- Drama tiga zaman [Drama of Three Epochs] (in Malay) (1st ed.). Kuala Lumpur: Dewan Bahasa dan Pustaka [Language and Literature Council]. 1984. OCLC 10866996.
- Glosari istilah kesusasteraan. Kuala Lumpur: Dewan Bahasa dan Pustaka, 1988 (совместно с др.).
- (ред.) Modern ASEAN Plays: Malaysia. Kuala Lumpur: ASEAN Committee on Culture & Information, 1994

=== Plays ===
- Perantau zaman. Kuala Lumpur: Dewan Bahasa dan Pustaka 1986
- Pentas opera . Kuala Lumpur : Dewan Bahasa dan Pustaka, 1989
- The opera house Malay: Pentas opera. Translator: Solehah Ishak. Kuala Lumpur: Dewan Bahasa dan Pustaka, 1989
- Keris Mas. Kuala Lumpur: Dewan Bahasa dan Pustaka, 1989 (совместно с др.)
- Siti Zubaidah: Sebuah skrip bangsawan Kuala Lumpur: Istana Budaya, 2001
- Komedi dalam trilogi drama ([Cet. 1] ed.). Bangi: Penerbit Universiti Kebangsaan Malaysia. 2006. ISBN 967942765X.
- Merdeka! merdeka! merdeka!: Sebuah drama sejarah. Kuala Lumpur : Istana Budaya, 2006
- Trilogi Raja Lawak. Kuala Lumpur: ITBM, 2014

=== Theatre and film criticism and theory ===
- Drama Melayu moden dalam esei (in Malay). Dewan Bahasa dan Pustaka, Kementerian Pelajaran, Malaysia. 1981. OCLC 8585273.
- Filem: Karya dan karyawan (kumpulan esei dan kritikan filem) Kuala Lumpur: Akademi Seni Kebangsaan, 2005.

=== Educational ===
- Mengenal Budaya Bangsa. Kuala Lumpur: Dewan Bahasa dan Pustaka, 1990.
- Kemahiran hidup bersepadu kemahiran teknikal (Tingkatan 1, 2, 3 KBSM) (cовместно с K. H. Khiu). Petaling Jaya: PEP Publications, 2009
- Kemahiran hidup bersepadu: Kemahiran teknikal. (Tingkatan 1, 2 & 3 KBSM) (совместно с Rubiah Effendi). Petaling Jaya, Selangor : PEP Publications, 2012
