= Muna Masyari =

Indonesian writer (born 1985)

- Born: Munawaroh Masyari; 26 December 1985 (age 40); Pamekasan, Madura, East Java, Indonesia
- Occupations: Writer, tailor
- Spouse: Muhatip
- Writing career
- Language: Indonesian
- Genres: Short story, novel
- Notable works: Martabat Kematian (2019); Rokat Tase' (2020); Damar Kambang (2020)
- Notable awards: Kompas best short story (2017); Anugerah Sutasoma (2020); Penghargaan Sastra, Badan Bahasa (2021)

Muna Masyari (born Munawaroh Masyari; 26 December 1985) is an Indonesian short story writer and novelist from Pamekasan, on the island of Madura. Self-taught as a writer, she published her first story in 2004. Her fiction shows Madurese culture from a woman's perspective.

Her story "Kasur Tanah" was named Kompas's best short story of 2017. Her collections Martabat Kematian (2019) and Rokat Tase' (2020) received the East Java Language Office's Anugerah Sutasoma in 2020 and the Agency for Language Development and Cultivation's literary award in 2021 respectively, and her novel Damar Kambang (2020) was nominated for the 2021 Kusala Sastra Khatulistiwa. She has also published the collection Kembang Selir (2023). As of 2023, her main income was from tailoring.

== Early life ==
Munawaroh Masyari was born in Pamekasan, Madura, on 26 December 1985. She developed an interest in literature through reading, including books available at school, and taught herself to write creatively by studying the work of other authors. In a 2021 interview she cited Ahmad Tohari and Oka Rusmini as influences on the way she describes landscapes and settings.

== Writing career ==
Masyari's first published story, "Menyibak Tirai Kelam" ("Parting the Curtain of Darkness"), was an entry in a 2004 Islamic short story contest run by the magazine Annida; it appeared under her older sibling's name because she did not yet have an identity card. She used Facebook to find writing communities and through this learnt how to submit stories to newspapers and magazines, and began sending stories to the newspaper Kompas in 2010. Her first story in a national publication appeared in Republika in 2011. Her story "Celurit Warisan" ("The Heirloom Celurit"; 2016) was selected for Kompas's annual anthology Cerpen Pilihan Kompas 2016. Her short story "Kasur Tanah" ("Dirt Mattress") was selected as Kompas's best short story of 2017. The award was presented in June 2018 during the newspaper's anniversary celebrations, where the Teater Mandiri troupe, directed by Putu Wijaya, performed a stage adaptation of the story.

In 2029, Sulur published Martabat Kematian (The Dignity of Death), a collection of her short stories. It received the 2020 Anugerah Sutasoma from the East Java Language Office (Balai Bahasa Provinsi Jawa Timur), which was presented to her on 15 October 2020 in Sidoarjo. Penerbit Buku Kompas published her collection Rokat Tase' (Sea Thanksgiving Ritual) in February 2020; it contains twenty stories drawing on Madurese traditions and local myths. The book received the literary award (Penghargaan Sastra) of the Agency for Language Development and Cultivation (Badan Pengembangan dan Pembinaan Bahasa) in 2021.

Her novel Damar Kambang (Floating Oil Lamp) was published by Kepustakaan Populer Gramedia in 2020, and was nominated for the 2021 Kusala Sastra Khatulistiwa.

Kembang Selir (The Concubine's Flower), published by DIVA Press in 2023, is a collection of fifteen of her short stories, most of which had previously appeared in national media.

== Themes ==
Masyari has described her prose as a way of presenting Madurese culture from a woman's perspective, and has said that she draws many of her ideas from the experiences of Madurese women around her. Her fiction depicts women negotiating customs such as arranged and early marriage, and she has travelled within Madura to research the local traditions that appear in her stories.

In a 2020 study of four stories from Martabat Kematian, the literary scholars Erika Citra Sari Hartanto and Miftahur Roifah examined her portrayals of women confronting early arranged marriage and restrictive cultural expectations, arguing that her female characters speak up and seek agency over their own futures.

Her novel Damar Kambang is set in Karang Penang, a Madurese community where traditions coexist with modern life. Its central character, Cebbhing, is about fourteen when her wedding to Kacong is called off because her family considers the groom's wedding gifts an insult to their honour. Kacong and his uncle Sakrah then put a spell on her. After she goes to Kacong and becomes pregnant, her father, Madlawi, abuses her and arranges for her to marry his religious teacher, the kiai Ke Bulla, as his third wife. Two other women narrate parts of the story. One is Marinten, Ke Bulla's second wife, who was lost by her first husband in a wager on a bull race, along with the family's salt ponds and home. The other is Kacong's mother who was raped by her brother-in-law Sakrah. At the end of the novel, Kacong learns that Sakrah is his biological father.

The novel depicts Madurese wedding customs such as the mokka' blabar ritual, in which the groom's party must be admitted at the gate of the bride's home, and presents Cebbhing's marriage to the kiai as a cure for an illness attributed to witchcraft. Writing in Karas in 2021, S. Prasetyo Utomo read the novel as a feminist exploration of women's struggles within patriarchal traditions. A study by the literary scholars Diyana Mareta Hermawati, Aquarini Priyatna and Amaliatun Saleha in 2024 examined the novel's use of three female first-person narrators: Cebbhing, Marinten and Kacong's mother. They argued that this structure presents women as subjects who question their circumstances within marriage, and saw the characters' actions as resisting prescribed gender roles and customs.

== Personal life ==
As of 2023, Masyari was married to Muhatip, an electronics repairer, and had had four children, two of whom had died. Muhatip has said that while he knows little about writing, he is fully supportive of her writing career. She worked as a tailor in Larangan Badung, Pamekasan, and sewing was her main source of income. She has described how she develops story ideas while tailoring.

== Awards ==
- 2017 – Best short story of the year, Kompas, for "Kasur Tanah"
- 2020 – Anugerah Sutasoma, Balai Bahasa Provinsi Jawa Timur, for Martabat Kematian
- 2021 – Penghargaan Sastra, Badan Pengembangan dan Pembinaan Bahasa, for Rokat Tase'
- 2021 – Kusala Sastra Khatulistiwa (nominated), for Damar Kambang

== Works ==
=== Short story collections ===
- Martabat Kematian (Yogyakarta: Sulur, 2019)
- Rokat Tase' (Penerbit Buku Kompas, 2020; ISBN 978-623-241-207-1)
- Kembang Selir (Yogyakarta: DIVA Press, 2023; ISBN 978-623-189-210-2)

=== Novels ===
- Damar Kambang (Kepustakaan Populer Gramedia, 2020)
