= Malou Jacob =

Filipino playwright

Malou Leviste Jacob is a Filipino playwright. She was a recipient of the S.E.A. Write Award.

== Biography ==
Jacob has been a resident playwright of Philippine Educational Theater Association (PETA). She finished Bachelor of Arts in Communication in Maryknoll College (now Miriam College). She continued her studies in the field of TV production and Direction in City University of New York; and Film production in New York University. She has written and directed a lot of dramas for television and documentary films. Her works include Pagod na Ako, Irog, and a TV special about the National Artist Amado V. Hernandez. She has been a teacher in playwriting workshops of PETA-CITASA and has also been creative consultant of Communication Foundation for Asia.

== Works ==
Works she has written for PETA Kalinangan Ensemble include

- Timbangan ay Tagilid (1970)
- Aidao (1972, co-written by Franklin Osorio)
- Raha Sulayman at Megat Salamay (1978)
- Juan Tamban (1979)
- Ang Mahabang Pagdadalawang Isip sa Maikling Buhay ng Isang Peti-Burgis (1982).
- Pepe

Quotes:

"A playwright cannot work in isolation. A playwright must be in touch with the realities behind our make-believe world."
