= Chit Oo Nyo =

Burmese writer

- ချစ်ဦးညို
- Born: 30 December 1947; Mandalay, Burma
- Occupations: writer; novelist; script-writer; academic
- Spouse: Myint Myint Aye
- Writing career
- Pen name: Chit Oo Nyo
- Genres: Historical Novel, Buddha's life based novel, Short story
- Notable work: Lingadipa Chithu
- Notable awards: S.E.A. Write Award (2017)

Chit Oo Nyo (Burmese: ချစ်ဦးညို; born 30 December 1947) is a Burmese writer, novelist, script-writer and academic. He is considered a gifted author of Myanmar literature in the 20th century.

He has written many historical fictions using his creative talent of writing with different views on history, novels based on the life of the Buddha, and a few contemporary novels.

Lingadipa Chitthu is one of his prominent works, regarded as a popular classic in Myanmar. He made a number of literary speeches at different literary events home and abroad. Since 1999, he has served as an external examiner and advisor of the National University of Arts and Culture, Yangon and fellow of the university too.

== Life and career ==
=== Youth ===
Chit Oo Nyo was born Kyaw Swar on 30 December 1947 in Mandalay, Myanmar, the oldest of the seven children, to parents U Shwe Daung Nyo and Daw Sein Yin. Called Kyaw Kyaw when young, he grew up with stories told by his grandma, Daw Aye Kyin, a headmistress at a primary school. When he learnt reading at school, he visited the school library and read story books. That was how he loved reading.

He got a scholarship after 7th grade. When his grandparents asked him what he wanted, his reply was to buy the whole series of novels called "Detective U San Shar". Not only did they buy the novel series but also they then bought 12 volumes of "His Philosophy" by Sagaing U Phoe Thin. He once said in an interview that the love and passion for literature rooted in him thanks to the guidance and support of his family and the people around him and he became a civilized man.

The works of Bhamaw Tin Aung, Mya Than Tint are said to have influenced him in his early life. He spent his young life studying at several schools in Mandalay. In 1962 he went to Mandalay University and moved to Yangon University to study Philosophy, which he graduated with honours of three subjects in 1968. Then he continued to study to earn a Master's degree.

=== Career ===
==== Academic career ====
He at first chose an academic career as a tutor serving at Workers' college (Yangon), Sittwe college and the Yangon Co-operative Central school from 1969 until 1974. Then he gave up his academic job and earned his living as a scriptwriter and director for Sandar Oo theatrical group, a traditional and cultural performance troupe.

==== Literary career ====
In 1977 he earned for a living as a writer. From 1983 to 1988 he worked as an editor for Thabin magazine (a theater magazine). From 1999 to 2000 he was an editor-in-chief at Shwepyitan Journal.

A short story 'Yangon Downtown', for the first time, appeared in the October issue of Moewai magazine is the piece with which he is said to become an author.

Later his works of novels, articles and translations appear in Moe Wai and Shumawa literary magazines. In the mid-1970s, he could write his debut and smash hit novel 'Lingadipa Chitthu' (Beloved of Lanka) (လင်္ကာဒီပချစ်သူ). The novel is a different version of the Ramayana epic, where he plotted the storyline in which he, unlike the original version, depicted Ravana as the protagonist.

Afterwards he wrote many novels with historical background of Bagan, Innwa, Taunggoo, Hanthawaddy and Konbaung eras. Apart from the historical novels, he has also written many novels based on the life of the Buddha and several contemporary novels.

He has been one of the few writers who deliver most literary speeches both at home and abroad like a few Asian countries for the Myanmar audience. In recent years, he participated in up to about 200 literary events by giving talks in a year.

He established a publishing house named 'Lingadipa'.

==== Theatrical career ====
Shwe Daung Nyo, Chit Oo Nyo's father, was one of noted theatrical (or) stage performers and acted as a tutor for traditional male-dance when the school of arts and culture was first opened in 1952. Young Chit Oo Nyo did not learn from his father how to write dramas, play musical instruments systemically but he got familiar with the dialogues, songs, verses used in the field of the theatrical performance when time went by. He said that his father did teach him 'Baby Phoe Sein dance', a type of dance for a boy.

Chan Tha, a prominent stage performer, said, "Chit Oo Nyo is, no doubt, interested in performing arts and his style of dancing implies that he is really crazy about Ramayana dance. His body and hand movements are as well much attractive." He contributed to Myanmar traditional theatrical field by writing stage dramas, editing Thabin magazine (a theater magazine) from 1983 to 1988, scriptwriting and directing in a theatrical group.

==== Film career ====
Not only have some of his novels been adapted into films but also he has been acting as a scriptwriter and/or shooting manager for many films in the film industry. In the academy-award winning film Thu Kyun Ma Khan Bi (Never shall we be enslaved!) released in 1997, he did the screenplay of the film and was assigned as an art director and production designer as well. He was chosen as one of the scriptwriters for the upcoming film 'Aung San' that is expected to be screened in late 2020.

Wu yue chuan qi or Musical Legend, the joint drama TV series between China and Myanmar, is based on a historical story of Pyu Era and the original script was written by Chit Oo Nyo.

== Lingadipa Chithu ==
Lingadipa Chithu is the most well-known historical novel ever written by him and was first published in 1977. The novel is based on the Ramayana epic story, where Rama is the protagonist. From a different perspective on the main epic story, he wrote a novel of his own, where Ravana (Dassagiri) (Note: Dassagiri (ဒဿဂီရိ) is an alternative name of Ravana in Myanmar and is the king of Rakshasa tribe, a man-eating ogre tribe, and usually described to have ten heads; one in view and nine hidden.) is the hero and protagonist of the novel. He also depicted Ravana as a dynamic and pitiable character. Chit Oo Nyo was only 29 when he wrote the book. The book was republished three times until 2015. The novel has been translated into English.

== Influences ==
As a young person, Chit Oo Nyo read and admired many works by notable authors such as Sagaing U Phoe Thin, Mya Than Tint, Bhamaw Tin Aung and Thakhin Mya Than. And when he wrote historical fictions, he had to study many chronicles and essays by historians like Than Tun. Being a graduate in philosophy, he said his favorite subjects were the philosophy of history and aesthetics, which equally influenced his works very much.

== Honours ==
In 2017, 'the Southeast Asian Writers Award' was bestowed on him.

Strange to say, he has not got any Myanmar National Literature Award yet.

== Selected works ==
He has authored over 89 books and some of his selected works are as follows:

- Lingadipa Chitthu(လင်္ကာဒီပချစ်သူ)
- Meeting with Dawissara (ဒေဝစ္ဆရာနှင့်တွေ့ဆုံခြင်း)
- The great envoy of peace(ငြိမ်းချမ်းရေးမဟာတမန်)
- Unhistoric, historic and historical speeches (သမိုင်းမတွင် သမိုင်းတွင် သမိုင်းဝင်နေတဲ့ စကားများ)
- The King's dancer and legendary novels (ဘုရင့်ကချေသည်နှင့် ရာဇဝင်ဝတ္ထုရှည်များ)
- The prisoner of Yadanargiri(ရတနာဂီရိအကျဉ်းသား)
- Yazakumara(ရာဇကုမာရ)
- Joyful utterance of Manisanda(မဏိစန္ဒာဥဒါန်း)
- Queen Shin Saw Pu(ဘုရင်မ ရှင်စောပု)
- Lord treasurer (ရွှေတိုက်စိုး)
- The pain of love from Suvannabhumi(သုဝဏ္ဏဘူမိ ဝေဒနာ)
- Hninn Kethaya's beloved hero (နှင်းကေသရာချစ်တဲ့သူရဲကောင်း)
- Kosambi(ကောသမ္ဗီ)
- Ma Gyambon from a row of (seven) houses (ခုနှစ်အိမ်တန်းက မဂျမ်းပုံ)
