= SEA Write Award =

Southeast Asian poetry and prose award

S.E.A. Write Award logo

The S.E.A. Write Award, or Southeast Asian Writers Award, is an award that is presented annually since 1979 to poets and writers of Southeast Asia.

The awards are given to the writers from each of the countries comprised in the Association of Southeast Asian Nations, though not all countries in ASEAN are represented every year. The award is sometimes given for a specific work by an author, or it could be awarded for lifetime achievement. The types of works that are honored vary, and have included poetry, short stories, novels, plays, folklore, and scholarly and religious works.

The ceremonies are held in Bangkok, with a member of the Thai royal family presiding. The award was conceived by the management of The Oriental hotel in Bangkok, which then sought further backing from Thai Airways International and other companies. The ceremonies have featured some notable guest speakers, including Iris Murdoch, Peter Ustinov, Jeffrey Archer, James A. Michener, Gore Vidal, William Golding, Rita Dove and Paul Theroux. The 2006 keynote speaker, Nobel Prize laureate Wole Soyinka canceled his keynote speech in protest against the Thai military's coup against the government, and was replaced at the last moment by S. P. Somtow.

The 2011 ceremony was postponed until February 2012 because of the 2011 Thailand floods. Edwin Thumboo was the keynote speaker. The 2016–18 ceremonies were postponed due to the passing of the Thai king in 2016. The three Singaporean winners received their awards in November 2019.

== List of S.E.A. Write Award winners ==
=== 1979–1989 ===
Until 1984, ASEAN comprised Indonesia, Malaysia, the Philippines, Singapore and Thailand. Brunei was admitted in 1984 and its first S.E.A. Write honoree was named in 1986.

Year	Brunei	Indonesia	Malaysia	Philippines	Singapore	Thailand
1979	-	Sutardji Calzoum Bachri	A. Samad Said	Jolico Cuadra	Edwin Thumboo	Kampoon Boonthawee
1980	-	Putu Wijaya	Baharuddin Zainal (Baha Zain)	Nick Joaquin	Masuri bin Salikun	Naowarat Pongpaiboon
1981	-	Goenawan Mohamad	Abdullah Hussain	Gregorio C. Brillantes	Wong Meng Voon 黄孟文	Ussiri Dhammachote
1982	-	Marianne Katoppo	Usman Awang	Adrian Cristobal	M. Balakrishnan (Ma Ilangkannan)	Chart Korbjitti
1983	-	Y. B. Mangunwijaya	Adibah Amin	Edilberto K. Tiempo	Arthur Yap	Komtuan Khantanu (Prasatporn Poosusilapadhorn)
1984	-	Budi Darma	A. Latiff Mohidin	Virginia R. Moreno	Wong Yoon Wah	Wanich Jarungidanan
1985	-	Abdul Hadi Wiji Muthari	Arena Wati (Muhammad Dahalan bin Abdul Biang)	Ricaredo Demetillo	Noor S.I. (Ismail bin Haji Omar)	Krisna Asokesin (Sukanya Cholsuk)
1986	Muslim Burmat (Haji Muslim bin Haji Burut)	Sapardi Djoko Damono	Kemala (Ahmad Kamal Abdullah)	Jose Maria Sison	Paranan (C. Veloo)	Angkarn Kalayanapong
1987	Yahya bin Haji Ibrahim	Umar Kayam	Noordin Hassan	Bienvenido N. Santos	Lee Tzu Pheng	Paitoon Thanya (Thanya Sangkapanthanon)
1988	Leman Ahmad (Haji Leman bin Ahmad)	Danarto	Azizi Haji Abdullah	Rio Alma (Virgilio S. Almario)	Leou Pei Ann (Chua Boon Hean)	Nikom Rayawa
1989	Adi Kelana (Haji bin Haji Muhamad Said)	Gerson Poyk	Siti Zainon Ismail	Lina Espina Moore	Suratman Markasan	Chiranan Pitpreecha

=== 1990–1994 ===
Year	Brunei	Indonesia	Malaysia	Philippines	Singapore	Thailand
1990	Awang Mohd Salleh bin Abd. Latif	Arifin C. Noer	S. Othman Kelantan	Carmen Guerrero Nakpil	Rama Kannabiran	Anchalee Vivatanachai
1991	Mohammad Zain	Subagio Sastrowardoyo	Jihaty Abadi (Yahya Hussin)	Isagani R. Cruz	Gopal Baratham	Mala Kamchan (Charoen Malaroj)
1992	Awang Haji Abdul Rahman	Ali Akbar Navis	Ismail Abbas	Alfred Yuson	Cheong Weng Yat	Saksiri Meesomsueb (Kittisak)
1993	Pengiran Haji Mohd. Yusuf (Yura Halim)	Ramadhan K.H.	Kamaruzzaman Abdul Kadir	Linda Ty-Casper	Muhammad Ariff Ahmad	Sila Komchai (Winai Boonchuay)
1994	Yang Mulia Awang Haji Morshidi bin Haji Marsal (Mussidi)	Taufiq Ismail	A. Wahab Ali	Buenaventura S. Medina Jr.	Naa Govindasamy	Chart Korbjitti

=== 1995–1999 ===
Vietnam joined ASEAN in 1995 and named its first S.E.A. Write honoree in 1996. Laos and Myanmar were admitted in 1997 and named their first honorees in 1998. Cambodia joined ASEAN in 1999, and named its first S.E.A. Write honoree that same year.

Year	Brunei	Cambodia	Indonesia	Laos	Malaysia	Myanmar	Philippines	Singapore	Thailand	Vietnam
1995	P.H. Muhammad Abdul Aziz	-	Ahmad Tohari	-	Suhaimi Haji Muhammad	-	Teodoro T Antonio	Dan Ying (Lew Poo Chan)	Paiwarin Khao-Ngam	-
1996	Pengiran Haji Sabtu bin Pengiran Haji Mohamad Salleh	-	W.S. Rendra	-	Zaharah Nawawi	-	Mike L. Bigornia	Minfong Ho	Kanokphong Songsomphan	To Huu
1997	Awang Mohammad bin Haji Timbang	-	Seno Gumira Ajidarma	-	Muhammad Haji Salleh	-	Alejandro Roces	Elangovan	Win Lyovarin	-
1998	Badaruddin H.O.	-	N. Riantiarno	Thongkham Onemanisone	Othman Puteh	Sinbyu-Kyun Aung Thein	Marne L. Kilates	Abdul Ghani Hamid	Raekham Pradouykham (Suphan Thongklouy)	Ma Van Khang
1999	Norsiah M.S. (Mohd Shahri bin Pokjlaid Haji Md Hussin)	Pich Tum Kravel	Kuntowijoyo MA.	Chanthi Deuanesavanh	Khadijah Hashim	Kyaw Aung	Ophelia Alcantara Dimalanta	Catherine Lim	Win Lyovarin	Huu Thinh

=== 2000s ===
Year	Brunei	Cambodia	Indonesia	Laos	Malaysia	Myanmar	Philippines	Singapore	Thailand	Vietnam
2000	Pehin Dato Abdul Aziz bin Juned	Kong Bun Chhoeun	Wisran Hadi	Souvanthone Bouphanouvong	Lim Swee Tin	Daw Yin Yin (Saw Mon Nyin)	Antonio Enriquez	Teoh Hee La 张曦娜	Wimon Sainimnuan	Nguyen Khai
2001	Rahim M.S. (Awang Haji Ibrahin bin Haji Muhammad)	Mao Ayuth	Saini K.M. (Saini Kosim)	Somsy Dexakhamphou	Zakaria Ariffin	Htin Gyi (Tekkatho Htin Gyi)	Felice Prudente Sta. Maria	K. T. M. Iqbal(Mohamed Iqbal)	Chokchai Bundit (Chokchai Bunditsilasak)	Nguyen Duc Mau
2002	Rosli Abidin Yahya	Seng Sam An	Darmanto Jatman	Viseth Svengsuksa|Viseth Svengsuksa	Anwar Ridhwan	-	Roberto T. Añonuevo	Mohamed Latiff bin Mohamed	Prabda Yoon	Nguyen Kien
2003	Hashim bin Haji Abdul Hamid	Kim Pinun	Nh. Dini	Theap Vongpakay	Zakaria Ali	-	Domingo G. Landicho	Philip Jeyaretnam	Duanwad Pimwana	Bang Viet
2004	Jawawi bin Haji Ahmad	Chey Chap	Gus tf Sakai	Thongbay Phothisane	Zurinah Hassan	-	César Ruiz Aquino	Soon Ai Ling 孙爱玲	Rewat Phanpipat	Do Chu
2005	Rahimi A.B.	Miech Ponn	Acep Zamzam Noor	Bounseune Sengmany	Abdul Ghafar Ibrahim	-	Malou Jacob	P. Krishnan	Binlah Sonkalagiri (Wuthichat Choomsanit)	Phu Tram
2006	Sawal Rajab	Pal Vannarirak	Sitor Situmorang	Douangdeuane Bounyavong	Jong Chian Lai	-	Victor Emmanuel Carmelo D. Nadera, Jr.	Isa Kamari	Ngarmpun Vejjajiva	Le Van Thao
2007	Haji Moksin bin Haji Abdul Kadir	Ourn Suphany	Suparto Brata	Ratanavong Houmphanh	Prof. Rahman Shaari	-	Michael M. Coroza	Rex Shelley	Montri Sriyong	Tran Van Tuan
2008	Zairis M.S.	Sin Touch	Hamsad Rangkuti	Othong Khaminsou	Hatta Azad Khan	-	Elmer Alindogan Ordonez	Stella Kon	Vachara Sajasarasin (Vachara Phetchphromsorn)	Nguyen Ngoc Tu
2009	Hajah Norsiah binti Haji Abdul Gapar	-	Floribertus Rahardi	Khamseng Synonthong	Azmah Nordin	-	Abdon Jr Balde	Chia Hwee Pheng	Uthis Haemamool	Cao Duy Son

=== 2010s ===
Year	Brunei	Cambodia	Indonesia	Laos	Malaysia	Myanmar	Philippines	Singapore	Thailand	Vietnam
2010	Wijaya (Awang Mohd Jamil)	-	Afrizal Malna	Dara Kanlaya	Zaen Kasturi	-	Marjorie Evasco	Johar Bin Buang	Zakariya Amataya	Nguyen Nhat Anh
2011	Mohd Zefri Ariff bin Mohd Zain Ariff	-	D Zawawi Imron	Bounthanong Xomxayphol	S.M. Zakir	-	Romulo P. Baquiran Jr.	Robert Yeo Cheng Chuan	Jadet Kamjorndej	Nguyen Chi Trung
2012	Pengiran Haji Mahmud bin Pengiran Damit (Mahmudamit)	-	Oka Rusmini	Duangxay Luangphasy	Ismail Kassan	-	Charlson Ong Ong	Suchen Christine Lim	Wipas Srithong	Trung Trung Dinh
2013	Haji Masri Haji Idris	Sok Chanphal	Linda Christanty	Soukhee Norasilp	Mohamed Ghozali Abdul Rashid	Maung Sein Win	Rebecca T Anonuevo-Cunada	Yeng Pway Ngon	Angkarn Chanthathip	Thai Ba Loi
2014	Haji Mohd Yusuf bin Haji Mohd Daud	Var Sam Ath	Joko Pinurbo	Somsouk Souksavath	Md. Ismail Zamzam	Daw Khin Than	Jun Cruz Reyes	Haresh Parmanand Sharma	Saneh Sangsuk (Dan-arun Saengthong)	Thanh Thảo (Ho Thanh Cong)
2015	Haji Abdul Aziz bin Tuah	Kho Tararith	Remy Sylado	Phonesavanh Phanthavichith	Jasni Matlani	Ledwinthar Saw Chit	Jerry B. Gracio	Jamaludeen Mohamed Sali	Veeraporn Nitiprapha, Saiduean Ta Bod Nai Khaowongkot ("Blind Earthworms in a Labyrinth")	Tran Mai Hanh
2016	Haji Jamaluddin bin Aspar	Proeng Pranit		Soubanh Luangrath	Rejab bin Ismail	Aung Cheimt	Bienveindo Lumbera	Ovidia Yu	Phalang Phiangphirun (Kirksit Palamart), Nakhorn Kon Nork ("The City of Outsiders")	Nguyen The Quang
2017	Haji Mahadi Bin Haji Matarsat (Mahadi R.S.)	Lek Chumnor		Somchay Chanthavong	Zainal Abidin Suhaili	Chit Oo Nyo	Kristian Sendon Cordero	Chia Joo Ming	Jidanun Lueangpiansamut, Singto Nork Khok ("The Unorthodox Lion")	Tran Hung
2018	Tarif bin Haji Abdul Hamid	Pol Pisey		Phiulavanh Luangvanna	Mawar Safei	Ma Thida	Ricardo Monreal de Ungria	Goh Mey Teck	Veeraporn Nitiprapha, Phutthasakkarat Asadong Kub Song Jam Khong Song Jam Khong Maew Kularb Dam ("Memories of the Memories of the Black Rose Cat")	Le Minh Khue
2019	Haji Abdul Hamid bin Haji Tamat (Salmi Mesra)		Eka Kurniawan		Shamsudin Othman		John Iremil Teodoro, Pagngaran sa Elepante (Naming the Elephant)	Simon Tay	Angkarn Chanthathip, Rawang Tang Klub Ban ("On The Way Back Home")	Tran Quang Dao

=== 2020s ===
Year	Brunei	Cambodia	Indonesia	Laos	Malaysia	Myanmar	Philippines	Singapore	Thailand	Vietnam
2020	Haji Bujang bin Haji Matnor (Bujang M.N.)	Pech Sangwawan	Leila Chudori			Pyait Hlaing Oo (Pandora)	Christina Pantoja-Hidalgo, Pagan: City of Four Million Pagodas	Nadiputra	Jadet Kamjorndej, Kuen Pee Suea Lae Ruang Lao Khong Sat Uen Uen ("That Night of the Year of the Tiger and Other Animal Stories")	Vo Khac Nghiem
2021	Dr. Haji Morsidi bin Haji Muhamad (Morsidi M.H)		Yanusa Nugroho		Rosli K. Matari	Nat Mout Ah Ni Cho	Nicholas B. Pichay, Tanaw Mula sa Court of Appeals (View from the Court of Appeals)	Chua Chee Lay	Siriworn Kaewkan, Defun ("The Story of Defun")	Vinh Quyen
2022	Pengiran Haji Shamsu bin Pengiran Haji Kadar								Palita Phonpradapphet, Jon Kwa Lok Ja Ob Kod Rao Wai ("Until We Lie The World's Embrace")	Nguyen Binh Phuong, Mot vi du xoang (An ordinary example)
2023	Chong Ah Fok								Narisapongse Rakwattananont, Duai Rak Lae Phuphang ("Family Comes First")	Nguyen Mot, Tu gio thu sau den gio thu chin (From the sixth to the ninth hour)
2024	Hajah Nur Hamizah binti Haji Samihon, Dua Puluh		Matin Suryajaya	Panya Phanthaphanith	Roslan Bin Jomel	Knin Thandar	Edgar Calabia Samar		Prasertsak Padmarid, Kee Bad	Nguyen Tham Thein Ke
2025			Dorothea Rosa Herliany	Bounthavy Komphaphanh	Hafizah Binti Iszahanid	Ohn Maung	Ralph Lorenz Gapac Fonte		Siwakarn Pathumsoot, Ik Fak Dan Kadan Hok	Pham Thi Xuan Ban
2026									Wipas Srithong, Rang Plaeng: Samoraphum Haeng Khwam Wipalas Khong Nuea Nang ("Body Horror: The Battlefield of the Flesh's Madness")	
