= Paiwarin Khao-Ngam =

Thai writer

Paiwarin Khao-Ngam (Thai: ไพวรินทร์ ขาวงาม, born on February 10, 1961, in Roi Et) is a Thai writer.

His first work, There's No Poem From A Poor Man, was published in 1979. In 1995 he won the S.E.A. Write Award for his collection of poems, Banana Tree Horse.
