= Zaharah Nawawi =

Malaysian writer (1940–2022)

- Born: 5 May 1940; Kampung Parit Jawa, Batu Pahat, Johor
- Died: 31 May 2022 (aged 82); Rawang
- Occupations: Novelist, journalist
- Writing career
- Language: Malay
- Notable work: Anugerah
- Notable awards: S.E.A. Write Award (1996)

Zaharah Nawawi (5 May 1940 – 31 May 2022) was a Malaysian novelist, journalist and editor. She won the S.E.A. Write Award in 1996 for her novel Anugerah.

== Early life ==
Zaharah Nawawi was born on 5 May 1940 in Kampung Parit Jawa, Mukim Empat, Batu Pahat, Johor. She completed the sixth grade at Malay School Kampung Parit Jawa Mukim 4 in 1952. Zaharah started writing when she was 12 years old. She taught the Malay language at Chinese national schools in Yong Peng from 1957 to 1961.

== Career ==
From 1968 to 1976, she was on the editorial board of the magazine Wanita. She was a member of the Women's Magazine Editor's Conference in 1975 and 1976. Her first novel, Sebelum Berakhirnya Musim Bunga, was published in 1972. She worked as a journalist at Utusan Melayu for the Sunday paper Mingguan Malaysia and was the editor-in-chief of Mastika magazine in 1975 and 1976.

At Berita Publishing, a subsidiary of The New Straits Times Group, Nawawi was a general editor of Malaysian Language Publishing from 1976 to 1985. In 1985 and 1986 she was managing editor at Pustaka Cipta Sdn Bhd. She received funding from the House Language and Literature's Creative Donation fund to research Mohd Salleh bin Abdul Karim. The study led to Nawawi's 1988 book Panglima Saleh Selampang Merah. The book tells the story of the commander's struggle alongside villagers against the Communist activities and tyranny of the Malayan Peoples' Anti-Japanese Army in 1945 in Batu Pahat.

From 1988 to 1995, she was the editor of the magazine Timang, published by the National Population and Family Development Board of the Ministry of Women, Family and Community Development.

Nawawi wrote the 1995 novel Anugerah. The 1351-page historical novel is the longest in the Malay language and concerns opposition to the Malayan Union and Malay demands for independence. Described as her masterpiece, the novel was made into a play. Nawawi won the S.E.A. Write Award for Malaysia for Anugerah in 1996.

Nawawi was a guest artist for Dewan Bahasa dan Pustaka in 1997 and 1998, preparing the creative work Merentas Laluan.

During her writing career, Nawawi produced several adult novels, children's novels, and short story collections. She used a number of pen names throughout her career, including Zaharah binti Haji Nawi, I.M., Iman Murni, Pena Mutiara, Zahni Batu Pahat, Zahni Malaya, and Sutera Diwangga.

Her 1981 novel Jalur Sinar Di Celah Daun was a text used in schools for Forms 4 and 5 for seven years. Her children's book Ebe dan Eme won a national book prize in 1990 for best non-illustrated children's book. Nawawi wrote a biography of Azah Aziz in 2001. Her first collection of poetry, Warna & Waja, was published in 2003.

In 1993, she began holding writing workshops. In 1997, she founded the Zaharah Nawawi Writers Club (Kelab Penulis Zaharah Nawawi; KEPEZI). Writers who have attended Nawawi's workshops include Faisal Tehrani and Siti Jasmina Ibrahim.

== Selected works ==
=== Novels ===
- Sebelum Berhujungnya Musim Bunga (1972)
- Jalur Sinar Di Celah Daun (1984)
- Persisir Hitam (1985)
- Menuju Ke Puncak (1987)
- Selamat Datang Adzie Farahah (1988)
- Panglima Saleh Selampang Merah (1988)
- Anugerah (1995)
- Cinta Penyerahan Tragedi (written with Hamidah Kamaruddin; 2003)
- Hujan Sudah Teduh (2004)
- Haruman Kencana (2004)
- Jalur Sinar Di Celah Daun (2007)
- Bulan dan Mentari (2007)

=== Children's novels ===
- Ebe dan Eme (1988)
- Wira dan Tuah (three series; 1993)
  - Ke Mana Wira
  - Mencari Hujan Emas
  - Wira Anak Berjasa
- Komputer Baru Untuk Mama (short story collection)

=== Biographies and autobiographies ===
- Azah Aziz: Kartika di langit seni (2001)
- Merentas Laluan
- Paksi

== Awards ==
- S.E.A. Write Award (1996)
- Johor Darul Ta'zim Literary Prize (1999)
- Johor Literary Artist Prize (1999)

== Death ==
Zaharah died on 31 May 2022 at the KPJ Rawang Specialist Hospital in Rawang. Her cause of death was reported to be skin cancer. She was interred at the USJ 22 Islamic Cemetery in Subang Jaya.
