= Binlah Sonkalagiri =

Thai writer (1965–2025)

Wuthichat Choomsanit (Thai: วุฒิชาติ ชุ่มสนิท; 14 May 1965 – 6 November 2025), better known by the pen name Binlah Sonkalagiri (บินหลา สันกาลาคีรี, RTGS: Binla Sankalakhiri), was a Thai author. He won the S.E.A. Write Award in 2005 for his work Chao Ngin (Princess).

== Life and career ==
Wuthichat was born on 14 May 1965. He graduated high school from Mahavajiravudh Songkhla School in Songkhla Province. He attended the Faculty of Communication Arts at Chulalongkorn University but did not graduate before starting his career as editor-in-chief Pai Yarn Yai, a publication belonging to writer and singer Suu Boonliang. He also worked as a reporter for Matichon and Khao Sod daily newspapers before turning to writing on his own in 1994.

As Binlah Sonkalagiri his works include short stories, children's books, novels and travel documentaries. Under his real name, Wuthichat's works include Chan Duem Duang Arthit (I Drink the Sun), Kid Tung Took Pee (Miss You Every Year), Pla Chalarm Fun Lor (The Broken Tooth Shark), Duem Talay Sarb, and Arb Talay Say (Drink in the Lake, Bathe in the Desert).

Sonkalagiri resided in Chiang Mai Province, and died on 6 November 2025, at the age of 60.
