= Kanokphong Songsomphan =

Thai writer (1966–2006)

Kanokphong Songsomphan กนกพงศ์ สงสมพันธุ์
- Born: 9 February 1966; Khuan Khanun, Phatthalung Province, Thailand
- Died: 13 February 2006 (aged 40)
- Occupation: Writer
- Writing career
- Notable works: Another Land; The Broken Bridge
- Notable awards: S.E.A. Write Award (1996)

Kanokphong Songsomphan (Thai: กนกพงศ์ สงสมพันธุ์; 9 February 1966 – 13 February 2006) was a Thai writer. He won the S.E.A. Write Award for Thailand in 1996 with a collection of short stories entitled Another Land (Thai: แผ่นดินอื่น; RTGS: Phaendin Uen). His other major work was The Broken Bridge (Thai: สะพานขาด; RTGS: Saphan Khat), which was translated into Japanese.

== Biography ==
=== Early life, education ===
Kanokphong completed his primary education at Wat Pikulthong School and his secondary education at Phatthalung School. He published his first poem, The Truth That Is (Thai: ความจริงที่เป็นไป; RTGS: Khwamching Thi Pen Pai), at age 15 in a local newspaper. By age 18, he was one of the co-founders of the Nakhon Group, a local panel of academics and writers dedicated to conserving culture and literature in Nakhon Si Thammarat. The group evolved into a publishing company.

He published his first short story, Like the Burning Sun (Thai: ดุจตะวันอันเจิดจ้า; RTGS: Dut Tawan An Choetcha), in Matichon Weekly. Several more short stories appeared in various magazines.

He attended Prince of Songkla University, studying management science, but dropped out to further develop his writing by travelling in the Luang mountains and learning about the local cultures there.

=== Collected works, awards ===
His first collection of poetry, Forest of Dewdrops (Thai: ป่าน้ำค้าง; RTGS: Pa Namkhang), was published in 1988. It was followed in 1989 by a collection of short stories, The Broken Bridge (Thai: สะพานขาด; RTGS: Saphan Khat). It won the Karaked Laurel Award and was translated into Japanese in 1990.

In 1996, another short story, The Small World of Salman (Thai: โลกใบเล็กของซัลมาน; RTGS: Lok Bai Lek Khong Sanman), also won the Karaked Laurel Award, making Kanokphong the first to win the award twice.

His second collection of short stories, The Monocotyledon Man (Thai: คนใบเลี้ยงเดี่ยว; RTGS: Khon Bai Liang Diao), was published in 1992.

Kanokphong's third collection, Another Land (Thai: แผ่นดินอื่น; RTGS: Phaendin Uen), won the S.E.A. Write Award in 1996. One of the stories, The Cat of Bukeh Krue Saw (Thai: แมวแห่งบูเก๊ะกรือซอ; RTGS: Maeo Haeng Buke Krue So), concerns a group of soldiers sent to protect a village. Tragedy occurs and the soldiers are forced to withdraw. Kanokphong said the collection was a summation of the conflicts in Southern Thailand.

=== Forest retreat ===
From 1996, Kanokphong lived in the "Valley of Rains and Forest" in Amphoe Phrom Khiri, Nakhon Si Thammarat Province. He retreated from being active on the literary scene, but eventually issued his last collection of short stories, The World Revolves Around Itself (Thai: โลกหมุนรอบตัวเอง; RTGS: Lok Mun Rop Tua Eng).

Another book was forthcoming, but Kanokphong was in poor health. Fellow S.E.A. Write laureate Thanya Sanyapantanont said Kanokphong's working habits during this period were "an attempt at self immolation".

=== Death ===
In February 2006, Kanokphong was admitted to Nakharin Hospital for treatment of influenza. He was discharged but later readmitted, where he succumbed to a severe lung infection. Funeral services were held at Wat Pikulthong in Phatthalung.
