= Wimon Sainimnuan =

Thai writer

Wimon Sainimnuan (Thai: วิมล ไทรนิ่มนวล; born in either 1955 or 1958) is a Thai author of contemporary fiction with strong Buddhist and social justice themes. In 2000 he was awarded the S.E.A. Write Award for his novel อมตะ (Amata, or Immortal).

Wimon Sainimnuan was born near Phra Pin Klao Bridge on the Thonburi side of the Chao Phraya River. His parents moved to Nakhon Pathom province two years later to grow rice; here he was exposed to a "traditional rural environment," which would inform much of his later writing, especially in terms of religious beliefs. At age 11, his parents moved the family back to "a tiny room in a wooden shack in the Huay Khuang slum." His father delivered coal and gambled; his mother made desserts for a street merchant. Around age 12, he began to suffer from migraines and ulcers. This period of Wimon's life was described in his 1987 novel, คนจน (Khon Chon, The Poor).

In 1975, at age seventeen, he published his first short story. Around the same time, he began three years of training at teacher colleges in Bangkok and Ayutthaya. He became a teacher and married a woman named Arunee, also a teacher. He started his career in Nakhon Pathom, but transferred to Ayutthaya after three years because of differences with the administration. In 1982, he published his first novel, แมงมุมอ้วน (Maengmum Ouan, The Fat Spider), a novel for children. That same year, he entered Srinakharinwirot University.

In 1983, Wimon's first collection of short stories appeared. Around the same time, using borrowed money, he started his own printing press, Tharntawan, to print translations that he commissioned from friends. In 1984, at age 26 he wrote in just 26 days his breakout novel, งู (Ngu, Snakes). งู, reportedly inspired by The Grapes of Wrath, "denounces the evil of power seekers hiding in monks' robes and the connivance between monks and politicians." He would continue as a teacher for a few more years before leaving to write full-time. Other novels include คนทรงเจ้า (Khon Songchao, The Medium, 1988, which was made into a film), โคกพระนาง (Khok Phranang, The Princess Mound, 1989), and จ้าวแผ่นดิน (Chawphaendin, Lord of the Earth, 1996), which form a series with Snakes, and Amata (2000).

Many of his books explore Buddhist themes and the dichotomy of an individual's will versus societal forces. Amata, for example, involves a wealthy businessman who has himself cloned with the intention of using the clones as organ donors. The plot revolves around the eventual transplantation of the businessman's brain into his clone's younger body. Since in Buddhism the heart is where the "mind" lives, the clone's mind can take control of the businessman's brain, thus freeing him from the older man's rule when the now unused body is committed to cryogenic storage. Wimon's works are populated by "bogus and genuine monks," murderers, kidnappers, rapists (and other sexual taboos), and good guys who are still "violent, ill-tempered, and foul-mouthed," and touch on themes that include the exploitation of farmers, women's liberation, the education system, and political problems of all kinds. Although some of his characters are "excessively black-and-white," he writes with a righteous anger and is bent on exposing fraud and "human failings."
