= Atsiri Thammachot =

Thai writer

Atsiri Thammachot (born 10 July 1947) is a writer in Thailand. He is the winner of the Southeast Asian Writers Award in 1981 for the short story "Khun-Thong you will return at dawn"

== Life and career ==
He was born in the Hua Hin district of Prachuap Khiri Khan to a family that fished the waters of the Gulf of Thailand for a living. He attended school in Hua Hin until his father lost his fishing boat at sea, at which point the family mortgaged the house and land so that the father could purchase another one, which he then lost at sea soon after.

National Statistics Office census work

After finishing up his secondary education in Bangkok, a biography of him in khɔ̀ɔp fáa thá-lee kwâaŋ notes that he worked for the National Statistics Office census in the provinces of Sakon Nakhon, Nakhon Phanom, and Phetchabun for two years. It is noted to be a time that allowed him to become informed of the problems facing communities in rural areas. Part of the reason for his going to work for the NSO were the difficult financial circumstances his family was confronting with respect to the fishery bringing in insufficient income.

In the prelude to his work, dèk phûu-jǐŋ khon kɛ̀ɛ mɛɛw lɛ́? phǒm, it is noted that while surveying for the NSO Thammachot went to villages with three hundred households or more, where beyond fulfilling his role of collecting data for the census he was able to communicate with household members on a variety of subjects, gaining first-hand accounts to learn of the particular challenges and obstacles facing these groups of people, and building up a more well defined sense of life in Isan and the north.

Marcel Barang writes that the period Thammachot spent working for the NSO in the Northeast and North exposed him to the “hotbeds of communist insurgency” that were prevalent in the late 1960s, and that during this time he started to drink, began to have an interest in politics, and kept records of his experiences that later functioned as a foundation for his future literary projects. Barang further notes that the 1972 work, An old man’s memories (sǎm-nʉ́k khɔ̌ɔŋ phɔ̂ɔ thâw), was the first of his short stories, and was based in large part on the experiences he had acquired while living in the Northeast.

University

When Thammachot completed his secondary school education in Bangsue north of Bangkok, he attempted to study in the department of Political Science at Chulalongkorn but failed to gain admission. However, after working for the NSO, he was accepted into the department of Public Relations and Mass Communications at Chulalongkorn. He began writing when he was an undergraduate student; for the short story An old man’s memories, noted above, he received third place in the competition for the prize phláp phlaam maa-lii in 2515 (1972) from the ‘Chulalongkorn Literary Assembly’.

He entered study in the department of Communication Arts at Chulalongkorn University in 1970.

Journalist and writer

After university, he went to work for two to three newspapers and attempted, without much success, to publish books about cinema. In 2517 (1974) he worked as a newsman for Siamrath and became a regular editor for the newspaper’s entertainment page; however, during the 1980s he was a regular columnist for Siamrath, and additionally assisted editors in choosing articles and letters to publish in the newspaper. Atsiri Thammachot still writes articles for Siamrath, and his pieces appear periodically in the form of editorials. In a discussion provided by a literary analysis group following the stories in the collection bâan rim thá-lee it is noted that Thammachot’s employment at the newspaper constrains the opportunities he has to write short stories, but at the same time, his role working in news media adds to his creative capacity through the perspective of one who is an observer (paraphrasing from Thai).

As for the themes that motivate his creative works, Thammachot remarks that he aims to have people in Thai society understand the lives of one another, especially the ‘small lives’ that exist at the fringes of society in Thailand. He says further that if he is able to accomplish this, regardless of how much or little this goal is met, people will be able to establish love and understanding and will be able to help and assist one another.

== Works ==
Short stories

In the collection of short stories bâan rim thá-lee a discussion following the texts by the Literary Analysis Group (klùm waan-ná-kaam phí-nít) provides outlines of the rhetorical character and central themes that emerge in Thammachoat’s work. Noting that his stories use language to generate a soft rhythm, the discussion points out that in almost all of Thammachot’s stories, the concept of pleasure and enjoyment (khwaam-rʉ̂ʉn-rom) as a guiding theme in the plot is absent. Recognizing that there are definite trends of sorrow, the Group also notes, however, that the central themes of his work do not concentrate on or suggest a loss of hope. Rather, concepts such as coming to an understanding of the realities of certain conditions, gaining new knowledge, and uncovering the beauty that hides in life’s small things (paraphrasing from Thai) appear in his work. The use of such ideas implies a sense of introducing a moral direction, which is aimed to educate the reader in some way.

Novels

In comparison with his short stories, his novels are said to bear a lot of similarities in terms of main ideas; however, the novels contain significantly more description and attention to individual details. For example, plots concentrating on people who earn a livelihood from the sea tend to show up amid changing economic and environmental circumstances owing to forces beyond their control in both types of work.

Marcel Barang sums up Thammachot’s literary contributions as focusing on “the plight of the common man”
