= Fiksimini =

Indonesian internet community

Fiksimini (meaning "miniature fiction"), also spelled fiksi mini, is an Indonesian internet community based on Twitter in which followers or fans write short compositions to pique reader interest. Its participants are known as Fiksiminiers.

== History ==
Fiksimini was founded by short story writers Clara Ng, Agus Noor, and Eka Kurniawan as a way for them to share and critique their work. Originally established on Facebook on 18 April 2010, it was later expanded to Twitter, where it found more of a following. Within several months, other writers, such as Ratih Kumala and Salman Aristo, joined, as did several entrepreneurs.

By January 2011, when Fiksimini had a national conference in Jakarta, the community had self-organised chapters in Yogyakarta, Surabaya, Jakarta, and Bandung. As of September 2011, Fiksimini has 77,000 followers, with 400 staff and facilitators. The participants come both from throughout the Indonesian archipelago and Australia. Similar groups include @Sajak_Cinta (meaning "Love Poems") and #Dialog3Akun (meaning "dialog of 3 accounts").

== Features ==
Fiksimini's goal is to have followers contribute short pieces of text to inspire or influence readers; the submissions must conform with Twitter's 140 character limit. To participate, interested parties write the hashtag #fiksimini followed by their work. A moderator then compares the work against a set of guidelines established by Noor and decides whether or not to retweet it; to be retweeted, the work must be minimalist in length but stick in its reader's mind and signify a much wider world. A retweeting by the channel is considered by the community the equivalent of being published.

According to The Jakarta Post, several contributors have published books since becoming involved with the community. As of September 2009 the community together has published five. For example, moderator Salman Aristo, better known for his screenplays, published an illustrated compilation of his politically themed fiksimini tweets under the title Politweet in 2011.

== Other projects ==
The community has developed a second online community for films, Film Fiksi Mini. It is under the supervision of Diki Umbara, a film critic. The first film prepared by the community was Ternyata Masih Cinta (So He Does Love Me), a short film based on a work about a man swallowing a ring so it could be close to his heart. Some films are made in one shot.

A community for songs has also been established, with singer Erdian Aji serving as facilitator. The community has had songs performed at the Hoopla! Film Festival in Singapore and the Ubud Writers and Readers Festival in Ubud, Bali. Ringback tones for several songs are also available.
