= F. Rahardi =

Indonesian poet and journalist

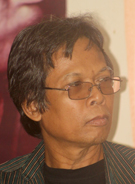
- F.Rahardi, Indonesian Writer and journalist
- Born: Floribertus Rahardi; 10 June 1950 (age 75); Ambarawa, Central Java, Indonesia
- Occupation: Indonesian writer

Floribertus Rahardi (born 10 June 1950) is a poet and a journalist.

== Biography ==
He also writes articles, columns, critiques on literature, short stories and novels. He dropped out of senior high school in grade 11, but passed a special examination to become a teacher in 1969. After that he became an elementary teacher and a head master in a school in Kendal Regency, Central Java. In 1974 he went to Jakarta and changed his profession into a journalist, an editor and wrote articles and columnist in various media. He first wrote poetry at the end of the 1960s and was published in Semangat Magazine, Basis Magazine (Jogjakarta), and Horison magazine (Jakarta). He then wrote articles, critiques on literature, short stories, and novels.

== Works ==
His works among others are: poetry anthology Soempah WTS (The Prostitutes Pledge) (1983), Catatan Harian Sang Koruptor (The Diary of a Corruptor, 1985), Silsilah Garong (Tree Family Tree of a Robber, 1990), Tuyul (The Small Bald Ghost, 1990) and Pidato Akhir Tahun Seorang Germo (New Year's Eve Speech of a Pimp, 1997). Short stories anthology Kentrung Itelile (1993). Article anthology Petani Berdasi(The Farmer who Wears A Tie, 1994). Anthology of reflections Menggugat Tuhan (Blaspheming God, 2000). Lyrical prose Migrasi Para Kampret (The Migration of Bats, 1993), and Negeri Badak (The Rhinoceros Country, 2007). Agriculture technical books Cerdas Beragrobisnis (Smart Agrobusiness, 2003), Agar Tanaman Cepat Berbuah (Tips for Accelerating Plants to Bear Fruits, 2007), and Bercocok Tanam dalam Pot (The Pot Plant, 2009). Other books Panduan Lengkap Menulis Artikel, Feature dan Esai (The Complete Guide to Write Articles, Features, and Essay, 2006), and Menguak Rahasia Bisnis Gereja (Uncovering The Secret of Church Business, 2007). Novels Lembata (2008), Ritual Gunung Kemukus (The Ritual of Kemukus Hill, 2008), and Para Calon Presiden (The Presidency Candidates, 2009).

In 1984 he was banned by the Jakarta Board of Arts when he intended to bring prostitutes in his poetry reading event from his book Soempah WTS (1984) in Taman Ismail Marzuki Jakarta. In 1986 he was banned by the police when he wanted to read his poems from the book The Diary of A Corruptor (Catatan Harian Sang Koruptor), also at TIM, Jakarta. On 30 December 1997 he launched his book titled New Year's Eve Speech of a Pimp (Pidato Akhir Tahun Seorang Germo), at the home that belongs to Soeharto, one of the pimps in a red district called Silir, Surakarta, Central Java. When he became Editor in Chief Trubus more writing at home. Office is used for managerial affairs.

== Recent activities ==
He currently involved in several public organisations, among them Indonesian Orchids Society (PAI), The Agribusiness Working Forum (FKA), The Indonesian Catholic Graduates and Intellectuals Affairs (ISKA), and Indonesian Experiential Learning Association (AELI). He was a vice director and editor in chief of the board of advisors in Majalah Trubus. Currently he acts as a guest editor for Flona Magazine, Hidup Magazine, Obor Publisher, and a columnist at Kontan Tabloid and Business News Bulletin.

He has lived in Kampung Tipar, Village Mekarsari, Cimanggis, Depok, West Java, Indonesia. he lives and works at home. He is married with three children.

== Awards ==
First award, in 1995 his poetry anthology titled Tuyul received an award Hadiah Sastra id:Ide Peluang Usaha Kecil untuk Pemula.

Second award, The SEA Write Award 2009 (Southeast Asian Writer Award) in Bangkok together with seven other recipients of the countries Malaysia, Laos, Brunei, Singapore, Philippines, Thailand, Viet Nam, and he himself represented Indonesia. A prestigious literary award in Southeast Asia. Award the SEA Write Award conducted since 1979 and given to the literary achievement in Southeast Asia. He received a plaque and some money. F. Rahardi received a prestigious gift by his The Rhinoceros Country (Negeri Badak), a lyric prose, a literary work which is not much cultivated by other writers. Before The Rhinoceros Country (Negeri Badak), F. Rahardi had written the lyrics to the title prose The Migration of The Bats (Migrasi Para Kampret).

Third award, F.Rahardi also won for the best Prose category with a work titled Lembata in the ninth Khatulistiwa Literary Award held at Plaza Senayan, Jakarta, Indonesia, 10 November 2009. For him the award is a recognition of this form of literature.

== List of publications ==
A list of publications is as follows

I. The Poetry Anthologies: (1.) Soempah WTS (The Prostitute's Oath) Published by Puisi Indonesia Foundations 1983 (2.) Catatan Harian Sang Koruptor (The Corruptor Diary) Published by PustakaSastra Foundations 1985 (3.) Silsilah Garong (The Robber Family Tree) Published by Pustaka Sastra Foundation 1990 (4.) Tuyul Published by Pustaka Sastra Foundation 1990 5. Pidato Akhir Tahun Seorang Germo (The Last Years Speech of The Pimp) Published by Puspa Swara 1997

II. The Short Story Anthologies: (1.) Kentrung Itelile Published by Puspa Swara 1993

III. The Lyrical Prose: (1.) Migrasi Para Kampret (The Migration of The Bats) Published by Puspa Swara 1993 (2.) Negeri Badak (The Rhinoceros Country) Published by Visi Media 2007

IV. Novel: (1.) Lembata Published by Lamalera 2008 (2.) Ritual Gunung Kemukus (The Kemukus Hills Ritual) Published by Lamalera 2008 (3.) Para Calon Presiden (The President Candidates) Published by Lamalera 2009

V. Other Kinds Of Books: (1.) Cerdas Beragrobisnis (The Best Idea of Agribusiness), Published by Kawan Pustaka 2003 (2.) Agar Tanaman Cepat Berbuah (The Handling of Fruits Crops), Publishing By Agromedia Pustaka 2007 (3.) Bercocoktanam Dalam Pot (The Containers Gardening), Publishing by Flona Magazine 2009 (4.) Panduan Lengkap Menulis Artikel, Feature, dan Esai (The Complete Tools Writing an Article, Feature, and Esay) Published by Kawan Pustaka 2006 (5.) Menguak Rahasia Bisnis Gereja (Opening in a Secret Church Business) Published by Visi Media 2007 (6.) Menggugat Tuhan (The God Accuse) Published by Kanisius 2000, etc.

VI. An Article: More Than 700 article publish at Kompas, Suara Pembaruan, The Jakarta Post, Tempo Magazine, Trubus Magazine, Hidup Magazine, The Business News, Kontan, etc.
