= Pal Vannarirak =

Cambodian novelist, poet and TV presenter

- Born: 23 November 1954 (age 71); Kampong Chhnang Province
- Occupations: Novelist; censor; poet

Pal Vannarirak (born 23 November 1954) is a Cambodian novelist, poet and TV presenter. She worked as a censor where she stole back her own books which had been confiscated. She has written over 40 books and she won the Southeast Asian Writers Award in 2006.

== Life ==
Vannarirak was born near the town of Kampong Chhnang in Kampong Chhnang Province in Cambodia.

Her family was affected by the Khmer Rouge and they were moved out into the country. During the Khmer Rouge, the movement unleashed a self-genocide that resulted in many deaths and particularly of the country's intelligentsia. It has been estimated that there were 38,000 intellectuals but by the end of the Khmer Rouge's ruke there were only 300 and the number of people who could not read or write was 6 out of ebery ten people.

On 7 January 1979 Vietnam claimed victory bringing the Khmer Rouge period to an end. However Vietnam was in charge and Vannarirak was recruited by the occupying forces as a censor. She values this job as knowing the kind of writing that was not allowed allowed her to secretly create that kind of writing. Sometimes the books were distributed as hand written copies in one hundred page notebooks. A novel required two or three notebooks and these would be bound together and then distributed by rental shops. Books that were not about socialism were illegal and she wrote over thirty stories and they were not about socialism. Her husband objected to her illicit activity but she ignored his objections. On occasion she saw that her own books had been confiscated by the censors. She was able to take them home and sell them for a second time.

On the 10th anniversary of that event Vannarirak was given first prize for her book "Darkness Went Away" which was her first novel.

In 1995 her novel Unforgettable won a Preah Sihanouk Reach Award. The war inside Cambodia ended in 1998.

The Southeast Asian Writers Award in 2006 was awarded to Vannarirak.

By 2007 she was the vice-president of the Khmer Writers' Association. She has written more than 40 books and dozens of short stories but she remembers crying when she found out that her husband had burned some of her original stories. She has also presented a TV show about books.
