= Na Govindasamy =

Singaporean academic

Na Govindasamy (18 April 1946 – 26 May 1999) was a Singaporean educator, writer and an Internet researcher.

Govindasamy was a lecturer at the National Institute of Education, who worked to develop the Singapore 16 bit Unicode system which uses Tamilnet and Tamilfix fonts and enables a user to input Tamil in all three computer platforms - Windows, Mac and Unix. These fonts enable a user to read emails and web pages in Tamil on a terminal with only a shell account.

Amongst his other achievements, Govindasamy contributed to the development of Tamil literature in Singapore. He made significant contributions, specifically the creation of several plays, dramas and short stories for radio and television. Among the plays, two proved to be very popular, namely Anbukku Apaal and Alaigal Oyvathillai. He also published a collection of short stories entitled Thedi, for which he received the National Book Development Council’s award in 1992. In 1977 in Singapore, he initiated the Ilakkiya Kalam (Literary Critics' Circle) which gathered and analysed the best stories of the period and subsequently a collection of the best short stories of 1977 was published in 1981. He also published a novelette, Velvi. In 1994, he was awarded the S.E.A. Write Award.

Govindasamy died in 1999.

== Awards ==
- 1994 S.E.A. Write Award
