= Veeraporn Nitiprapha =

Thai author of novels and short stories (born 1962)

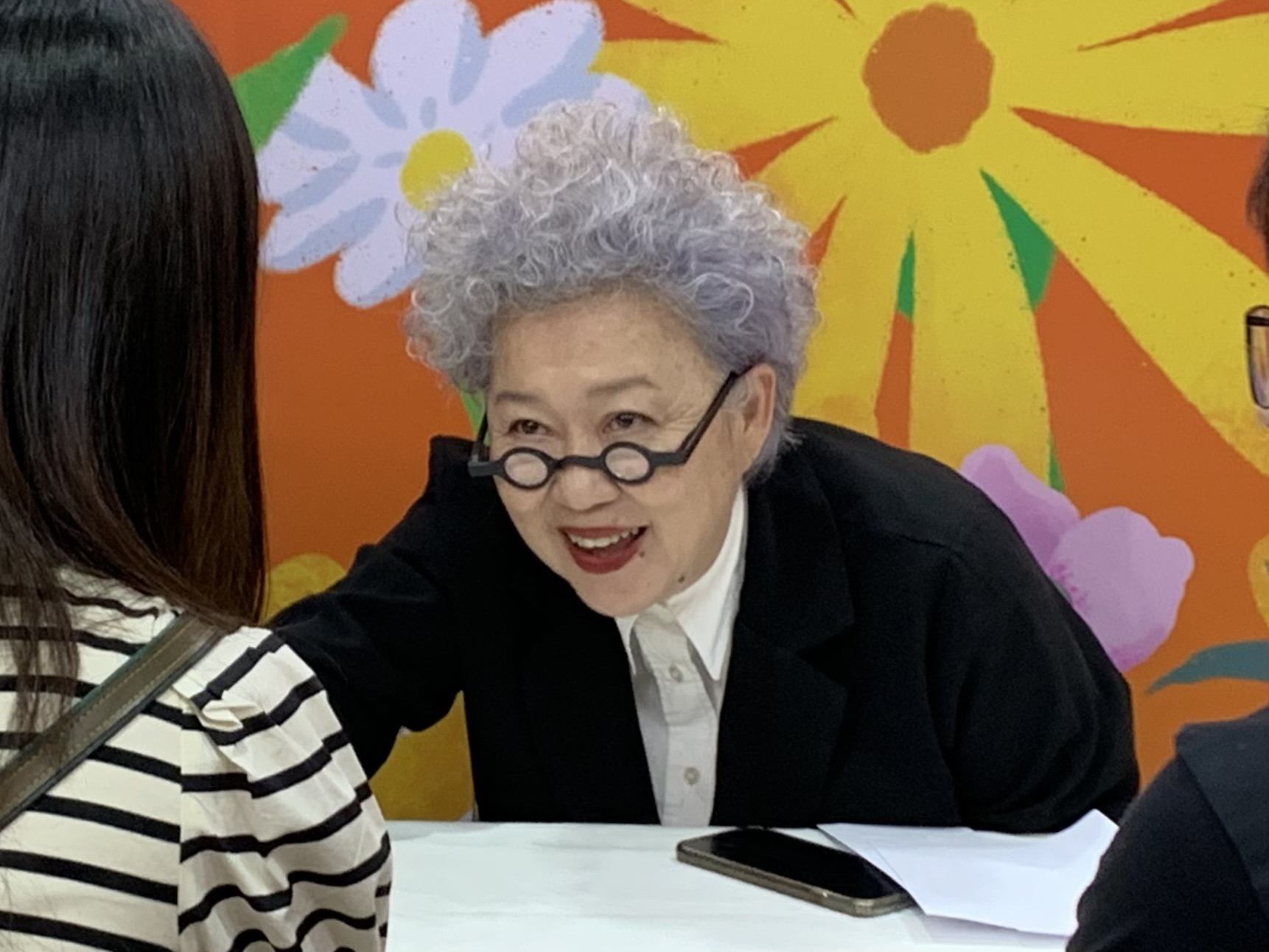
- Nitiprapha at Book Expo Thailand 2024
- Born: 4 August 1962 (age 64); Bangkok, Thailand
- Occupation: Novelist

Veeraporn Nitiprapha (Thai: วีรพร นิติประภา, RTGS: wiraphon nitiprapha; born August 4, 1962, in Bangkok) is a Thai author of novels and short stories. Her work has been acclaimed for its distinctive lyrical character, often influenced by classical Thai literature, and its subtle reflection on human relationship in modern Asian society and its intersection with current politics. Her first novel Saiduean Ta Bod Nai Khaowongkot (Blind Earthworms in a Labyrinth, ไส้เดือนตาบอดในเขาวงกต) won the prestigious Southeast Asian Writers Award (also known as S.E.A. Write Award) in 2015 and established her among the leading Southeast Asian writers of her generation. Nitiprapha has published several short stories in magazines, which are noted for their innovative narrative techniques and stylistic richness. Her second novel Phutthasakkarat Asadong Kub Song Jam Khong Song Jam Khong Maew Kularb Dam (Memories of the Memories of the Black Rose Cat, พุทธศักราชอัสดงกับทรงจำของทรงจำของแมวกุหลาบดำ) won S.E.A. Write Award in 2018, making her the first woman to win the literary award twice.

== Biography ==
Born in Bangkok, Veeraporn Nitiprapha was the second of two children in her family. She grew up and spent most of her life in Bangkok. She started writing and publishing poems and short stories at the age of 17. After a short period of studies in Melbourne, Australia, she returned to Bangkok and began her first career as an editor for a fashion magazine and then a copywriter for various advertising agencies, later becoming a creative director. She then decided to leave the advertising industry and turned to jewelry design. Since her jewelry brand, which she had run for more than a decade, closed down, she has been devoting herself entirely to writing.

Nitiprapha is married and has a son. She lives in Bangkok. She is known to be an avid gardener and a cat lover.

== Work in Translation ==
- ไส้เดือนตาบอดในเขาวงกต (Translated into English as The Blind Earthworm in the Labyrinth by Kong Rithdee; River Books, 2019)
- พุทธศักราชอัสดงกับทรงจำของทรงจำของแมวกุหลาบดำ (Translated into English as Memories of the Memories of the Black Rose Cat by Kong Rithdee; River Books, 2022)

== Works ==
=== Novels ===
- Saiduean Ta Bod Nai Khaowongkot (Blind Earthworms in a Labyrinth; ไส้เดือนตาบอดในเขาวงกต; 2015) ISBN 978-974-02-1222-5
- Phutthasakkarat Asadong Kub Song Jam Khong Song Jam Khong Maew Kularb Dam (Memories of the Memories of the Black Rose Cat; พุทธศักราชอัสดงกับทรงจำของทรงจำของแมวกุหลาบดำ; 2018) ISBN 978-974-02-1523-3
- Talaysab Namta (ทะเลสาบน้ำตา; 2020) ISBN 978-616-8132-17-3

=== Essays ===
- Prod Obkod Manoos Look (โปรดโอบกอดมนุษย์ลูก; 2020) ISBN 9786168255278

In 2018, Nitiprapha became the first woman to receive the S.E.A. Write Award twice, having previously won the award in 2015 for "The Blind Earthworm in the Labyrinth". Her second S.E.A. Write Award was presented for "Memories of the Memories of the Black Rose Cat", making her the third Thai writer overall—and the first Thai woman—to receive the honor twice.

== Movie Appearances ==
Veeraporn Nitiprapha appears in the 2023 Netflix series 6ixtynin9. Her character, identified in IMDB as the Lady in White (also listed as Angel in the credits), meets each character as they attempt to pass from living to the other side with dispassionate bureaucratic efficiency -- until she doesn't.
