= Nikom Rayawa =

Thai novelist

Nikom Rayawa (Thai: นิคม รายยวา; RTGS: Ni-khom Raiyawa; born 1944 in Sukhothai) is a Thai novelist.

He holds a bachelor's degree in Economics from Thammasat University, where he began his writing career. While there, he was the founder of the University's first writer's group. In addition to being a novelist, he has also worked on palm and cocoa plantations as well as being involved in the Thai petroleum industry.

In 1988, he received the S.E.A. Write Award.

== Writings in English ==
- High Banks, Heavy Logs; English translation by Richard C. Lair. Australia : Penguin, 1991. ISBN 0-14-014727-6
