= Wisran Hadi =

Indonesian writer

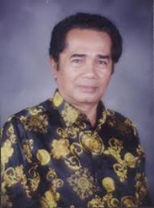
- Born: July 27, 1945; Padang, West Sumatra, Indonesia
- Died: June 28, 2011 (aged 65); Padang, West Sumatra
- Writing career
- Language: Indonesian
- Genres: Novels, plays, short stories
- Notable works: Four Malay Plays, Puti Bungsu, Jalan Lurus, Orang-Orang Blanti
- Notable awards: Southeast Asian Writers Award (2000)

Wisran Hadi (born 27 June 1945, Padang, West Sumatra – died 28 June 2011, Padang) was an Indonesian playwright and novelist. He won the Southeast Asian Writers Award in 2000.

== Life and education ==
Wisran was born in Lapai, Padang on 27 July 1945, the third of thirteen children. His father, H. Darwas Idris, was the Grand Imam of the Muhammadiyah Mosque in Padang and an expert in Indonesian interpretation of Islamic art. Wisran attended school in Padang, then completed religious teacher training there. He then studied at the Indonesian Fine Arts Academy (ASRI) in Yogyakarta, graduating in 1969.

His interest in writing developed after he returned to Padang in 1973. He won the DKJ Playwriting Competition (a script writing competition held by the Jakarta Arts Council) for the first time in 1976, going on to win it many more times. He took part in the International Writing Program at Iowa University, United States, in 1977, and also observed modern theatre in both the US and Japan.

He was a guest lecturer at the Faculty of Letters at Andalas University and INS Kayu Tanam.

He was married to poet Upita Agustina and had five children.

== Career ==
Wisran wrote more than fifty plays, five novels, a collection of poetry, and a number of short stories.

His dramatic work both drew on and subverted Randai, the folk theatre of the Minangkabau people. He was playwright/director of the Padang group Teater Bumi, which represented Indonesia in the 1990 Festival of Indonesia in the USA. His plays often employ dance and song to evoke the world of legend and spoken dialogue to voice the contemporary world. His 1978 play Puti Bungsu (youngest princess) attracted both praise and controversy, including the threat of action from the adat council. Other notable plays include Simpang (1977), Jalan Lurus (1985) and Four Malay Plays (2000), which was awarded the Southeast Asian Writers Award.

His novels include Di Pinggir Kota, di Pinggir Kita (1977, on the edge of us) and Orang-Orang Blanti (2000, the people of Blanti). His short stories include "Sore Itu Daun-Daun Mahoni Gugur Lagi" (1977, that afternoon the mahogany leaves fell again) and "Catatan Kumal Si Malin Kundang" (1986, Malin Kundang's dirty notes).

== Awards ==
He won the DKJ Playwriting Competition in 1976, 1978, 1979, 1980, 1981, 1984, 1985, 1997, and 1998. In 1991, he received an exemplary artist award from the Padang Level II Regional Government. Also in 1991 he received a literature award from the Language Centre for his play Jalan Lurus.

In 2000 he won the Southeast Asian Writers Award for Empat Sandiwara Orang Melayu (four Malay plays, 2000).

== Legacy ==
The Wisran Hadi Award is named after him. Recipients include Heru Joni Putra in 2019.
