= Gerson Poyk =

Indonesian writer (1931–2017)

- Gerson Poyk
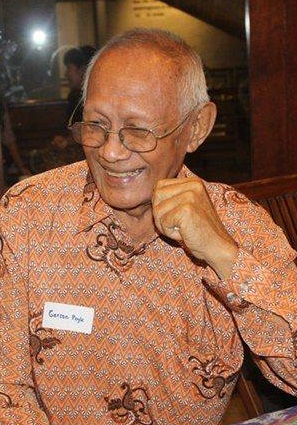
- Gerson Poyk. Jakarta, 2015
- Born: Herson Gubertus Gerson Poyk; 16 June 1931 (age 95); Namodele, Rote Island
- Died: 24 February 2017 (aged 85); Depok
- Citizenship: Indonesia
- Occupations: writer, journalist
- Spouse: Agustin Antuaneta Saba
- Children: Fanny J. Poyk
- Writing career
- Language: Indonesian
- Years active: since 1950s
- Genres: novel, short stories
- Notable awards: Journalistic Prize of Adinegoro (1965, 1966, 1985, 1986); S.E.A. Write Award (1989); Newspaper Kompas Award (Lifetime Achievement Award) for achievements in literature (1997); Indonesian Government Culture Award (2011); Prize of the Academy of the Province of Nusatenggara Timur (2012)

Gerson Poyk (June 16, 1931 – February 24, 2017) was an Indonesian writer and journalist, representative of the "Generation-66". Full name Herson Gubertus Gerson Poyk. Among friends he was known as "Pak Bea" (Sir Bea) or "Oom Bea" (Uncle Bea).

== Brief biography ==
Poyk was born in Namodele, Rote Island. He graduated in 1956 from a Christian school of teachers in Surabaya. After that he taught at schools in Ternate (1956-1958) and Bima (1958). In 1962–1970, he was a journalist in the evening capital newspaper "Sinar Harapan", in 1970-1971 – in the National information agency "Antara". Then during two years he was engaged in the international writing program at Iowa University (USA). In 1982, he participated in a literary seminar in India. He died in Depok, aged 85.

== Literary creativity ==
He started to write in the 1950s. He published his works in the magazines "Mimbar Indonesia", "Budaya", "Sastra", Horison. In the 1960s and 1970s he became a notable writer. He published more than 100 collections of poetry, short stories, essays and novels. The last collection of poems "Dari Rote ke Iowa" (from Rote to Iowa) was launched on June 25, 2016, as part of the celebration of the writer's 85th birthday.

The first novel "The First Days" was published in 1964 in the magazine "Mimbar Indonesia" and was highly appreciated by the well-known critic HB Jassin. The novels "Three Solo Concerts" and "The Pearl" were published in 1968. The novel "Teacher" based on the writer's experience at the school on Ternate, was written in 1971 and published by the authoritative Jakarta publishing house "Pustaka Jaya" in 1973. Among the collections of short stories are “Matias Akankari (1971), "Rocking and love letters of Alexander Rajaguguk" (1974), “Nostalgia for the Small Sunda Islands” (1976), “The Trap” (1978), “Under the Sun of Bali” (1982), "The Little Coral" (1985). The novels of the late 1970s and the 1980s are "Caresses of savannahs" (1979), “The Love thread” (1982), “The Bell” (1982), “Requiem for a Woman (1983), “The Pearl in the Paddy Field "(1984)," Prayer for Peace "(1987),"The Dream of Nyoman Sulastri and Hannibal" (1988),"Poti Volo"(1988), "Thunderstorm over the Country"(2010).

The writer's works have been translated into English, Dutch, German, Russian, Turkish and Japanese.

== Awards ==
- Journalistic Prize of Adinegoro (1965, 1966, 1985, 1986)
- S.E.A. Write Award (1989)
- Newspaper Kompas Award (Lifetime Achievement Award) for achievements in literature (1997)
- Indonesian Government Culture Award (2011)
- Prize of the Academy of the Province of Nusatenggara Timur (2012)

== Family ==
- The wife Agustin Antuaneta Saba (since 1960)
- Five children, including a daughter Fanny J. Poyk (writer and journalist)

== Memory ==
- The writer's name is given to a park Kupang (Taman Budaya Gerson Poyk).
- The association of the writers of the province of Nusatenggara Timur declared the writer's birthday as the Day of literature in this province.

== The main works ==
- Hari-Hari Pertama (1968)
- Sang Guru (1971)
- Cumbuan Sabana (1979)
- Giring-Giring (1982)
- Matias Akankari (1975)
- Oleng-Kemoleng & Surat-Surat Cinta Rajagukguk (1975)
- Nostalgia Nusa Tenggara (1976)
- Jerat (1978)
- Di bawah Matahari Bali (1982)
- Requim Untuk Seorang Perempuan (1981)
- Mutiara di Tengah Sawah (1984)
- Impian Nyoman Sulastri (1988) Hanibal (1988)
- Poli Woli (1988)
- Meredam Dendam (2009)
- Negeri Lintasan Petir (2010)
- Keliling Indonesia dari Era Bung Karno sampai SBY (2010)
- Seribu Malam Sunyi: Kumpulan Novelet (2012)
- Nyoman Sulastri: Ketika Kata Hati Begitu Pasti (2012)
- Seribu Malam Sunyi: Di Waktu Malam, Seperti Malam Ini, Aku Hanya Melihat Bintang-Bintang: Kumpulan Novelet (2012)
- Aku Dan Surabaya dan Nakamura (2016)

== Translations of the writer's stories into Russian ==
- A woman and her children. Translated by S. Kuznetsova // Modern Indonesian prose. 70th years. Compiled by V. Braginsky. Moscow: Raduga, 1988, p. 492-510
- Matthias Akankari. Translated by E. Rudenko // Modern Indonesian prose. 70th years. Compiled by V. Braginsky. Moscow: Raduga, 1988, p. 511-517
