= Anchan =

Thai writer

Anchalee Vivatanachai (born 1952), writing under the pen name Anchan, is a Thai writer living in the United States. She was a recipient of the S.E.A. Write Award.

== Biography ==
She was born in Thonburi and received a BA in Thai language and literature from Chulalongkorn University. After graduating, she went to live in New York City with her parents. She met her husband there. She studied gemology at the Gemological Institute of America and worked for a jewelry company in New York City.

Anchan published her first story "Mother Dear" which, in 1985, was named the best short story of the year by the Thai PEN Center. Her short story collection Anmanī hāēng chīwit (Jewels of Life) received the Southeast Asian Write Award in 1990. A collection of poems Lāisư̄ (The Letters) was shortlisted for a Southeast Asian Write Award in 1995.
