= Hamsad Rangkuti =

Indonesian writer (1943–2018)

- Born: Hasyim Rangkuti; May 7, 1943; Galang, Medan, Indonesia
- Died: August 26, 2018 (aged 75)
- Occupation: Writer

Hamsad Rangkuti (7 May 1943 – 26 August 2018) was an Indonesian writer.

In 2007, he won the South East Asian Write Award among Indonesian writers for "Bibir dalam Pispot".

== Works ==
- Bibir dalam Pispot (2003) ISBN 979-709-064-7; "Lips on the Chamber Pot", translated by Harry Aveling (Angkor Verlag; Kindle E-book 2015)
- Sampah bulan Desember : kumpulan cerpen (2000) ISBN 978-979-9251-55-8
- Cemara (1982)
- Lukisan perkawinan (1982)
- Ketika lampu berwarna merah (2001) ISBN 979-9251-65-6
- Aisyah di balik tirai jendela (2006) ISBN 979-25-7670-3
- Kalung dari gunung: kumpulan cerpen pengarang-pengarang aksara (2004) ISBN 979-9140-56-0
