= Jidanun Lueangpiansamut =

Thai writer

Jidanun Lueangpiansamut (Thai: จิดานันท์ เหลืองเพียรสมุท, born 18 September 1992) is a Thai writer and S.E.A. Write Award winner.

Jidanun began writing at the age of twelve. She has written fantasy stories and yaoi novels, but became widely known in 2017 when she became the youngest S.E.A. Write Award winner ever, for Singto Nok Khok, a collection of dystopian short stories.
