= Sok Chanphal =

Cambodian songwriter

- Born: August 27, 1984 (age 40); Kampong Cham Province, Cambodia
- Occupation: Songwriter
- Years active: 2010–present

Sok Chanphal (Khmer: សុខ ចាន់ផល; born August 27, 1984) is a Cambodian songwriter who got the S.E.A. Write Award in 2013.

== Awards and honours ==
- S.E.A. Write Award (2013)

== Related websites ==
- Staff, Post. "Sok Chanphal Tells How to Be a Successful Song Writer". www.phnompenhpost.com.
- "Book Fair to Inspire Khmer Youth - Khmer Times". 16 November 2014.
