= Mira W. =

Indonesian writer

- Born: Mira Widjaja (or Wong); 13 September 1951 (age 74); Jakarta, Indonesia
- Occupation: Author
- Writing career
- Language: Indonesian
- Genres: Romance, Children's

Mira Widjaja (Wong), or Mira W. (b. 13 September 1951), is a highly popular Indonesian author. In spite of her background being an ethnic Chinese of Cantonese extraction from the Peranakan Chinese diaspora community, her work now reaches audiences from the entire country. Her father, Othniel, was among the pioneers of the Indonesian movie industry. She writes in an accessible genre and deals with topics such as romance, crime and hospital life. She was a medical doctor before establishing herself as a writer.

== Biography ==
Mira was born in Jakarta on 13 September 1951 to film producer Othniel Widjaja (1908–1986) and his wife; she is the youngest of five children. Her brother, Willy Wilianto, became a filmmaker like his father. While in elementary school, she took up writing, which garnered support from her teachers. One of her teachers sent a short story Mira had written to a children's magazine, where it was published. Mira's first short story submitted on her own, entitled "Benteng Kasih" ("Fortress of Love") in Femina magazine in 1975, while she was attending medical school at Trisakti University. Her first novel, Dokter Nona Friska (Miss Friska's Doctor) was serialised in Dewi magazine in 1977; her second novel, Sepolos Cinta Dini (As Innocent as Puppy Love) soon followed. The following year, she published Cinta Tak Pernah Berhutang (Love has Never Been in Debt).

After graduating from Trisakti in 1979, she became a lecturer of medicine at Prof. Moestopo University in Jakarta. Mira's most successful book, Di Sini Cinta Pertama Kali Bersemi (Here Love First Blossomed), was published in 1980. She continues to produce works, drawing from writers such as Nh. Dini, Agatha Christie, Y. B. Mangunwijaya and Harold Robbins for inspiration. Mira has been cited as an early inspiration for another ethnic Chinese Indonesian female writer, Clara Ng.

== Pseudonym ==
The pen name Mira W., which obscures the Chinese-Indonesian names Widjaja and Wong, has been described by literary critic Pamela Allen as hiding Mira's Chinese heritage to better match Indonesian culture. Another writer said to use a pseudonym in such a manner is Marga T. This is due in part to illwill towards Chinese Indonesians during Suharto's New Order regime.

== Works and adaptations ==
As of 1995, Mira has published over 40 novels, many of which have been cinematized, including Dari Jendela SMP (From the Middle School Window), Di Sini Cinta Pertama Kali Bersemi, Ketika Cinta Harus Memilih (When Love Must Choose) and Permainan Bulan Desember (Games in December). In total she has contributed the story to twenty-three films and soap operas, making her debut as screenwriter in 1973's Jauh di Mata, directed by her brother Willy.

== Themes ==
Mira's main characters are always women, and the novels often show women suffering at the hands of men, as well as from their own internal conflicts. Her works also deal with gender roles and stereotypes.
