= Clara Ng =

Indonesian writer (born 1973)

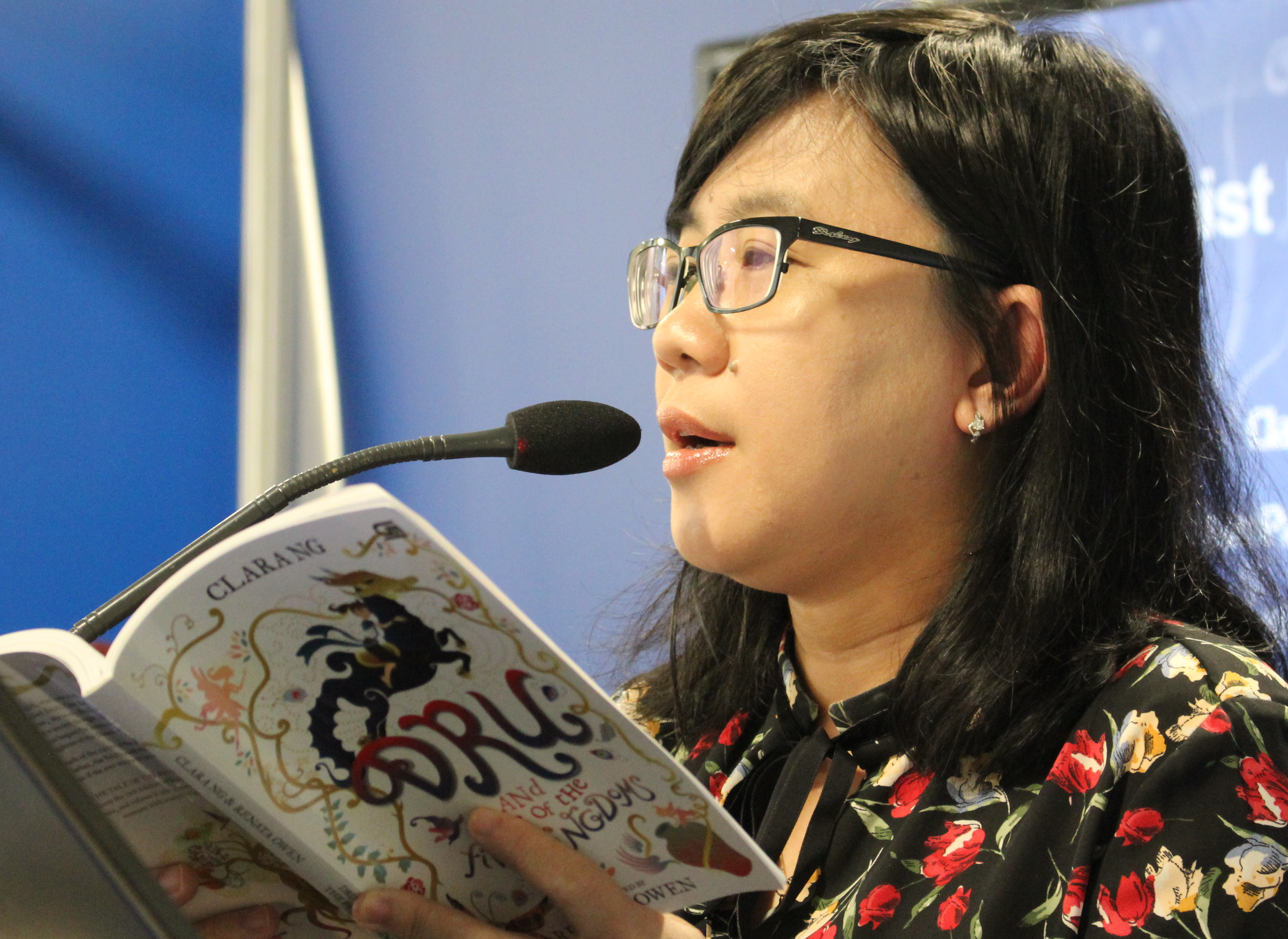
- Ng reading her book Dru and Tale of The Five Kingdoms at the 2019 London Book Fair
- Born: Clara Regina Juana; 28 July 1973 (age 53); Jakarta, Indonesia
- Education: Ohio State University
- Occupation: Author
- Spouse: Nicholas Ng (m. 2000)
- Children: 2
- Writing career
- Language: Indonesian
- Period: 2002–present
- Genres: Novels, short stories, children's
- Notable awards: 3 Adhikarya Awards

Clara Ng (née Regina Juana; born 28 July 1973) is an Indonesian writer who is known for both adult fiction and children's literature.

During her childhood in Jakarta, Ng enjoyed reading and read at an advanced rate. After finishing her primary and secondary education in Indonesia, during which time she took up writing, Ng went to the United States to study at Ohio State University. After her graduation in 1997, she worked in the US for a year before returning to Indonesia to work at a shipping company. After three years working there, in which time she married and had two miscarriages, Ng quit to become a professional writer. Her trilogy Indiana Chronicle was well received. Since then, she has released several novels, as well as numerous short stories (including one anthology) and twenty-one children's books, and some collections of fairytales.

Ng, who is a stay at home mother, writes in her spare time at home. Her topics are different depending on the genre she is writing in; her adult-oriented works often deal with minority groups, while her children's books are meant to teach empathy. Her children's works have won three Adhikarya Awards from the Indonesian Publishers Association, and LGBTQ groups have praised her novel Gerhana Kembar (Twin Eclipse; 2007) for avoiding stereotyping the group. However, some educators have protested the lack of an explicit moral message in her children's books.

== Biography ==
=== Early life ===
Ng was born in Jakarta on 28 July 1973 with the name Clara Regina Juana and was raised in the Kemayoran sub-district. She took up reading at a young age, reportedly capable of reading translations of The Adventures of Tintin by kindergarten. She also enjoyed Hans Christian Andersen's fairytale The Snow Queen, which influenced her writing. By age 11 she was reading adult-oriented works by Mira W. Ng attended Budi Mulia Elementary School from 1979 until 1986, then attended Van Lith Middle School until 1989; it was while in middle school that she taught herself creative writing and began creating works. She completed her high school education at Bunda Hati Kudus, graduating in 1992. While in high school, she became interested in social issues, including discrimination faced by ethnic Chinese, LGBT, and women.

After high school, Ng went to the United States and began studying at Ohio Dominican University in Columbus, Ohio, but later transferred to Ohio State University; she graduated with a bachelor's degree in interpersonal communications in 1997. While in the US, she read numerous children's books; these later influenced her writings. After graduating, she spent a year working in the US before returning to Indonesia in 1998. Upon her return to Indonesia, she spent three years working in the human resources department of Hanjin Shipping but left after she had two miscarriages, the first when she was seven months pregnant and the second at seven weeks. While staying at home, she took up writing.

=== Writing career ===
Ng made her debut as a novelist with Tujuh Musim Setahun (Seven Seasons A Year) in 2002, which sold poorly. She gained recognition with her Indiana Chronicle trilogy, which consists of Blues (2004), Lipstick (2005), and Bridesmaid (2005). These works were classified as pop literature, but readers identified with the main characters — urban working women. Tempo magazine notes that the trilogy pioneered the metro pop genre in Indonesia. Between Lipstick and Bridesmaid, another novel, The (Un)Reality Show, was released in 2005.

In 2006, Ng's short story "Rahasia Bulan" ("The Moon's Secret") was included in a lesbian and gay-themed short story collection of the same name. The work also included stories by Alberthiene Endah, Djenar Maesa Ayu, and Indra Herlambang. That year, she published two novels: Dimsum Terakhir (The Last Dim Sum) and Utukki: Sayap Para Dewa (Utukki: Wings of the Gods). The following year Ng published another two novels, Tiga Venus (Three Venuses) and Gerhana Kembar (Twin Eclipse). The latter, which was initially run as a serial in the newspaper Kompas and later picked up by Gramedia, was about lesbianism. The title was a result of Ng combining the Sun (commonly representative of men) and the Moon (commonly representative of women) to create a united symbol to represent homosexuality. Ng launched a short story collection, Malaikat Jatuh (Fallen Angel) in 2008. The collection dealt mainly with death. The collection was followed in 2009 by the novel Tea For Two, which was first published as a serial in Kompas.

Ng's short story "Barbie" was adapted as a film by actor-cum-presenter Raffi Ahmad in 2010, with Yuni Shara in the titular role. Barbie followed the story of a night-club singer and her lover, a security guard at the club. The film premiered at the LA Lights Indie movie festival. That same year she released two other books, Dongeng Tujuh Menit (The Seven-Minute Fairytale) and Jampi-jampi Varaiya (Varaiya's Incantations). Another one of her short stories, "Mata Indah", was included in the lesbian-themed anthology Un Soir du Paris (An Evening in Paris); other writers in the anthology included Seno Gumira Ajidarma, Ucu Agustin, and Noor.

In 2010, Ng, Agus Noor, and Eka Kurniawan established the Fiksimini community on Facebook as a way to critique each other's work, later branching out to Twitter. As of 2011 the community, with approximately 70,000 followers, allows writers, both professional and aspiring, to tweet an idea within the 140-character technical limitations of the software which could make the reader think. On 1 July 2011, Ng published Ramuan Drama Cinta (Love Potion Drama), and in November she released Dongeng Sekolah Tebing (Fairytales from the School on the Cliff), a collection of 53 stories about children who attend a school on a cliff.

Aside from writing novels and short stories, she also writes children's books, a genre that she entered due to a lack of Indonesian-language works. As of 2008, Ng has written 21 such books in three series: Berbagi Cerita Berbagi Cinta (Sharing Stories, Sharing Love; started in 2006 and numbering seven books), Sejuta Warna Pelangi (A Million Colours of the Rainbow; started in 2007 and numbering nine books), and Bagai Bumi Berhenti Berputar (As If the Earth Stopped Rotating; started in 2008 and numbering five books).

== Style ==
Ng's main characters are generally female. These characters generally do not hold the same employment; some occupations held by her characters include office worker, animal nursery employee, and automotive repair shop owner. Her children's stories are written simply, illustrated, and deal with children's feelings; they are intended to give children more empathy. The characters' names are chosen to be easy to remember.

== Reception ==
Ng has received several awards. Her 2006 children's story Rambut Pascal (Pascal's Hair, from the Berbagi Cerita series) won an Adhikarya Award for Best Children's Book from the Indonesian Publishers Association (Ikatan Penerbit Indonesia, or IKAPI). The following year she won the same award for Sejuta Warna Pelangi. Another followed suit in 2008 for Jangan Bilang Siapa-Siapa (does not Tell Anybody).

A. Junaidi, writing for The Jakarta Post, notes that Gerhana Kembar was well received by Indonesia's LGBT community as it did not link homosexuality to negative issues like drug use.

Ng notes that her children's stories have been generally well received. However, some educators disagree with the lack of an explicit moral message; Ng argues that her books have multiple interpretations: those by children and those by adults.

== Personal life ==
As of 2010, Ng is married to Nicholas Ng, a Malaysian citizen whom she met while working at Hanjin Shipping; the couple married in 2000. Together they have two children. She lives in Tanjung Duren, West Jakarta. According to an interview with Kompas, Ng is a stay-at-home mother and writes in an office in her house. She writes in her spare time, usually in the morning, as in the afternoon she must pick up her children.
