= Sugiarti Siswati =

Indonesian writer

Sugiarti (later Sugiarti Siswadi) (died May 1987) was an Indonesian writer from Klaten who came of age during the Indonesian Revolution. In 1947 she was a prizewinner in a competition organized by the IPPHOS (see Alex Mendur) for short stories about the war of independence. According to Harian Rakjat, she was a graduate of the Ali Archam Academy (closed 1964). Adding her husband's name to her own, Sugiarti Siswati became an influential member of the PKI-sponsored Lekra, which published her short story collection Sorga Di Bumi (1960), and by 1962 was co-editor of Api Kartini ("Flame of Kartini"), a journal of the Indonesian Women's Movement.

She was arrested following 1965's 30 September Movement and survived the ensuing massacres but disappeared from public life. In 1986 she showed several unfinished stories dealing with this period to Hersri Setiawan. Recent interest in her work has centered on her contributions to feminism.
