= Ucu Agustin =

Indonesian journalist, writer, and filmmaker

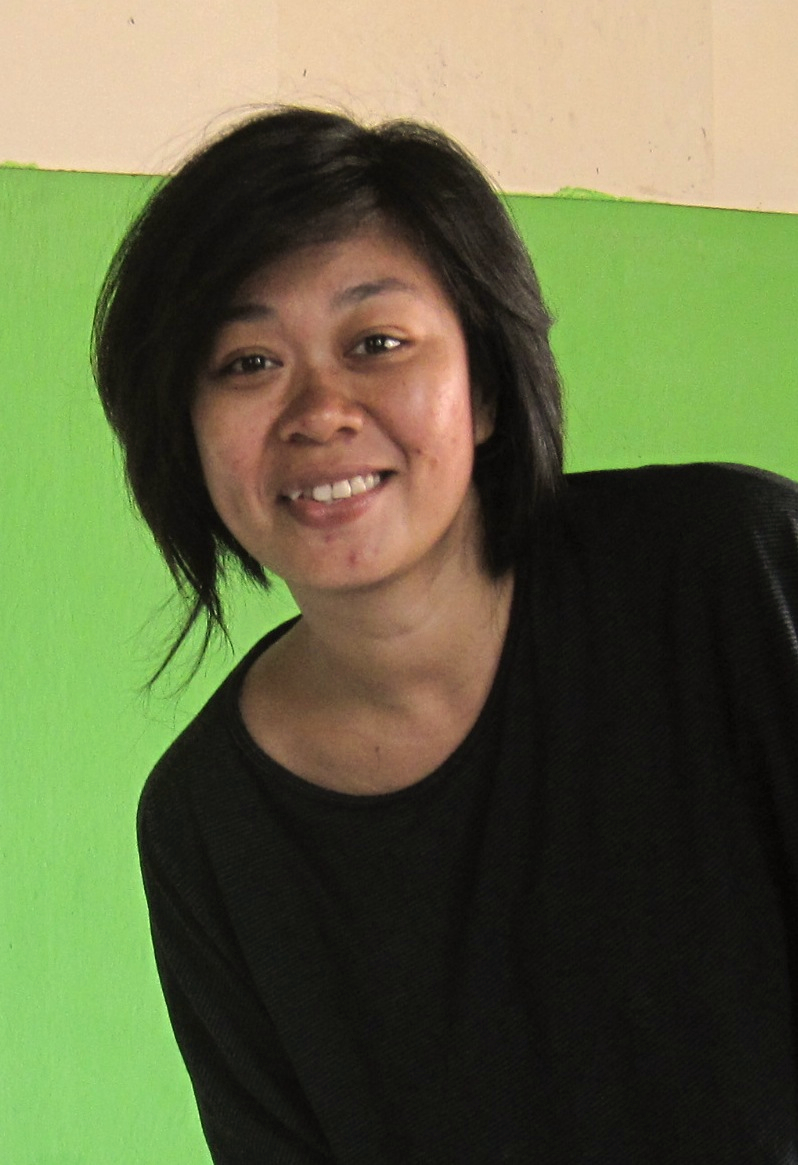
- Ucu Agustin in January 2011
- Born: 19 August 1976 (age 50); Sukabumi, West Java, Indonesia
- Education: Jakarta Islamic State University
- Occupation: Documentary filmmaker
- Height: 1.55 m (5 ft 1 in)

Ucu Agustin (born 19 August 1976 in Sukabumi, Indonesia) is an Indonesian journalist, writer, and documentary filmmaker.

Educated in an Islamic boarding school, Ucu became interested in journalism after realising that there were many prostitutes from her hometown. Beginning in the print media, she moved to making documentaries after she saw a lack of opportunities for human interest pieces in newspapers. One of her first documentaries, Death in Jakarta, was produced with the help of funds from the Jakarta International Film Festival. Other documentaries include Ragat'e Anak and Konspirasi Hening. She has also written several children's books and short stories.

Ucu has been described as "one of Indonesia's top documentary filmmakers" and often deals with social issues in her work. Ragat'e Anak was screened at the Berlin International Film Festival in 2009.

== Early life, education and early career ==
Ucu was born in Sukabumi, West Java, on 19 August 1976 to a strict Muslim family. As a child, she studied in the Darunnajah Islamic boarding school in Jakarta for six years; removed from the outside world, she felt shocked when she learned that many of the women in her hometown worked as prostitutes. This discovery led her to become more critical of the world around her and made her interested in journalism. Ucu later attended the Jakarta Islamic State University.

After graduation, Ucu began working with print media, contributing to Pantau magazine after publishing several short stories and articles elsewhere. Dissatisfied with the lack of opportunities for writing pieces dealing with social issues she later switched to audio-visual media; she has also cited the intense amount of editing that her works went through as a reason for the change, noting that there "always seemed to be a wide space between the reality that happened and the 'reality' that was reported".

Ucu also became active in writing. She published five Islamic-themed children's books in 2003, insisting on receiving royalties rather than the standard flat rate. She has also written a short story, entitled "Lelaki yang Menetas di Tubuhku" ("The Man That Hatched Inside My Body"), for inclusion in the lesbian-themed short story collection Un Soir du Paris (An Evening in Paris). The book also included stories by Clara Ng, Seno Gumira Ajidarma, and Agus Noor.

== Filmmaking ==
Ucu's first documentary was Pramoedya: Last Chapter. In 2005, Ucu made the 28-minute documentary Death in Jakarta. This film, dealing with the experiences of poor people after a loved one dies in Jakarta, was inspired by her observations when passing Utan Kayu Public Cemetery in Utan Kayu, East Jakarta. It was produced after becoming one of four finalists in the Jakarta International Film Festival Script Development Competition. Ucu received Rp. 25 million (US$3,000) in prize money and was lent a camera by the competition; it was her first time using a professional-grade camera. In April of that year she released Kalau Kanakar (If Kalakar?), a short story collection.

Her next film, Ragat'e Anak (For The Sake of Children), dealt with the lives of two part-time prostitutes in a cemetery in Tulungagung, East Java. The documentary was included in Pertaruhan (At Stake), a compilation of works produced by the Kalyana Shira Foundation. In August 2006, Ucu released a short story compilation, Dunia di Kepala Alice (The World in Alice's Head), and a novel, Being Ing. On 4 June 2009, the Tulungagung government shut down the prostitution district as a result of the documentary; in response, Ucu said that she regretted the decision.

Her next documentary, Konspirasi Hening (Conspiracy of Silence) was produced by Nia Dinata. It drew its title from a statement by Kartono Mohamad, former head of the Indonesian Doctors Association, that a "conspiracy of silence" had led to rules about healthcare being essentially unenforceable. The feature-length film, Ucu's first, explored healthcare issues in Indonesia by following the lives of three people, two who had suffered from malpractice and a poor man without access to healthcare.

In 2011 Ucu collaborated with Dinata again on Batik: Our Love Story, a documentary on the traditional textile batik. Dinata directed, while Ucu served as screenwriter. As of September 2011, Ucu is working on three documentaries: Knocking The Door, about the Indonesian Bill for Public Information; Thank You for Loving Me, about deforestation in Indonesia; and Where Did You Go My Love, about kidnap victims.

Through the Cipta Media Bersama program, run by the Ford Foundation in collaboration with several other groups, in November 2011 Ucu received a Rp.700 million (US$100,000) grant to produce a new film. The film, entitled Tidak Bermula [dan Tidak Berakhir] dengan Berita (Not Starting [and Not Ending] With News) will compare the habits of the press during the death of former president Soeharto and the media in 2012; it is hoped to shed light on issues faced by the press in both periods and promote media literacy.

== Themes ==
Ucu's Islamic children's books take a moderate stance.

Ika Krismantari, writing for The Jakarta Post, notes that Ucu tends to deal with "challenging" themes such as social injustice, healthcare, and gender inequality in her documentaries; gender issues are present in most of her works. Ucu considers social justice and human rights other key themes of her works.

Ucu has noted that she hopes that viewers are influenced by the hard lives faced by the subjects, whom she calls "inspiring". In September 2011, she stated that she was most pleased with Death in Jakarta, Ragat'e Anak, and Konspirasi Hening. Many of her documentaries are distributed online.

== Reception ==
Krismantari describes Ucu as "one of Indonesia’s top documentary filmmakers".

Ucu was one of the winners of the 2005 Jakarta International Film Festival Script Development Competition, which led to her being able to make Death in Jakarta. Pertaruhan, containing her documentary Ragat'e Anak, was shown in the Panorama section of the Berlin International Film Festival in 2009; together with Laskar Pelangi (also shown that year), it was the first Indonesian film shown in Panorama. Ucu went to Berlin with Dinata to attend the showing.

== Personal life ==
Krismantari describes Ucu as being "a petite woman who can pack a fair punch", in reference to Ucu's 1.55 m (5 ft 1 in) frame and strong mind.

== Filmography ==
- Pramoedya: Last Chapter (2006)
- Death in Jakarta (2006)
- Nine Lives of A Women (2007)
- Women Behind the Cut (2008)
- An Unfinished One (2008)
- Ragat'e Anak (For The Sake of Children; 2008)
- Waktu itu, Januari 2008: Sebuah Catatan Kaki (That Time, January 2008: A Footnote; 2009)
- Konspirasi Hening (Conspiracy of Silence; 2010)
