= Noordin Hassan =

Malaysian playwright and Malaysian National Laureate

Yang Berbahagia Datuk Noordin Hassan DSPN AMN
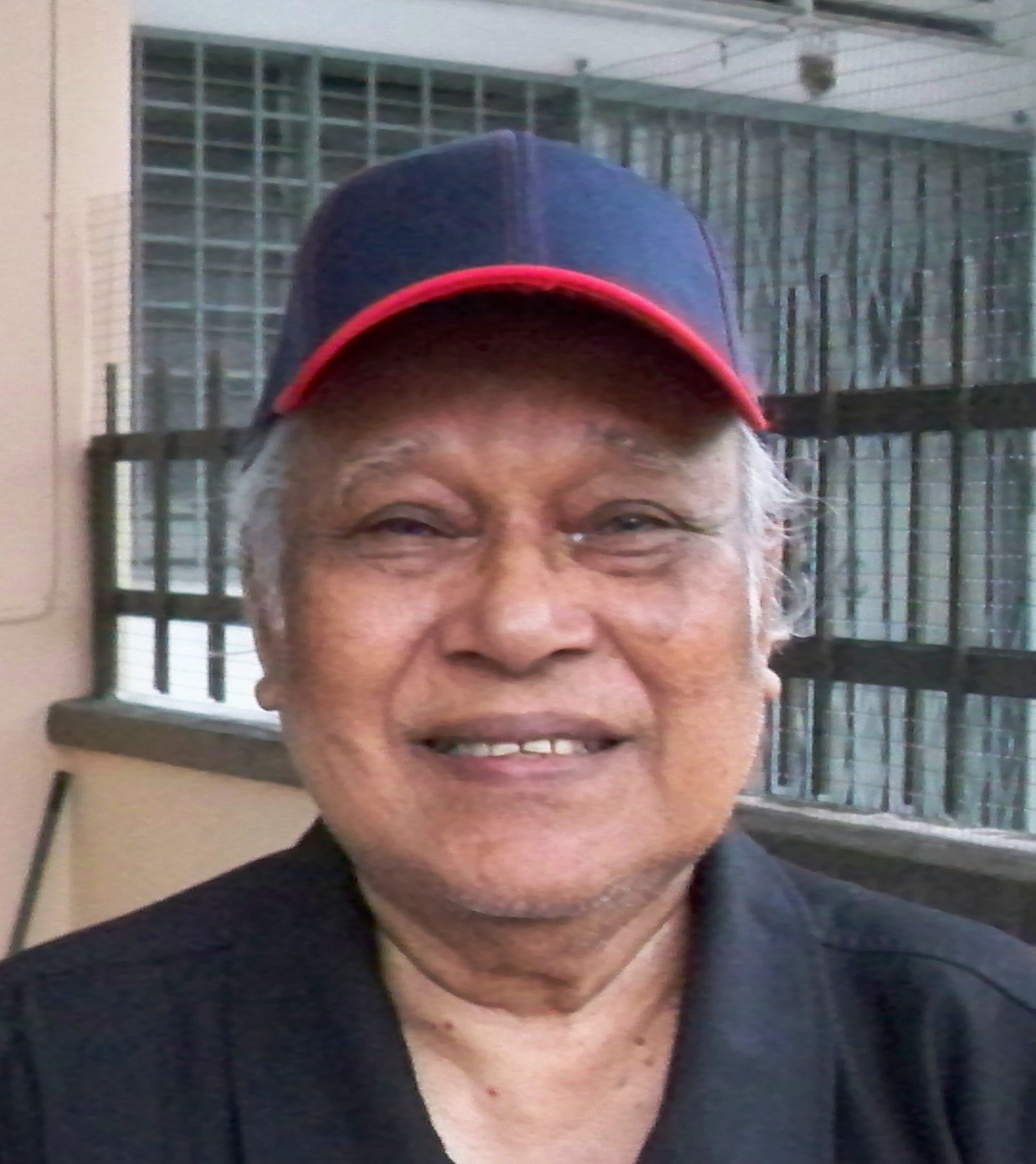
- Kuala Lumpur, September 2, 2012
- Born: Noordin Hassan; January 18, 1929 (age 97); Penang, Malaysia
- Citizenship: Malaysia
- Education: University of London
- Occupation: Playwright
- Writing career
- Language: Malay
- Years active: 1970s–present
- Period: 1962–1966
- Notable awards: Malaysian National Laureate (1993)

Noordin Hassan (born January 18, 1929, Penang) is a Malaysian playwright and Malaysian National Laureate.

== Brief biography ==
He received his secondary education in Malaysia, higher education in England (University of London, 1962–1966). He also followed the course of drama at Newcastle University (1976).

== Creativity ==
He wrote and performed on the basis of his plays more than 30 productions, in which social criticism takes imaginative fantastic-allegorical, sometimes absurdist forms. To enhance the attraction, he resorts to the techniques of the traditional Malay theater, boldly introduces verses, music, songs, clownish interludes ("No grass in the wind", 1970, "Do not kill butterflies", 1978; "This night the tortoise cried", 1994 etc.). Author of the concept of "theater of faith" (teater fitrah). Considering artistic creativity as an act of worshiping God and knowledge of God, he subordinates this subject to the plot and aesthetics of his works, widely resorting to Islamic symbolism and allegory. Among the plays of Islamic content is the play "Cindai".

== Awards ==
- Literary Prize of Malaysia (1972)
- Order of "Defender of the Crown" from the Paramount Ruler of Malaysia (1979)
- S.E.A. Write Award, Thailand (1987)
- Title Malaysian National Laureate – highest title for writers in Malaysia (1993)
- Order "For Service to the State" from Governor of Penang and the honorary title "Datuk" (1994)

== Bibliography ==
- A. Rahim Abdullah. "Melihat Nilai Melayu Melalui Dunia Mungkin Noordin Hassan" – dlm. "Dewan Sastera". Kuala Lumpur: DBP, 1993, No. 6 (Jun), hlm. 63–65; N 7 (Julai), hlm. 80–82.
- Halilah Haji Khalid. Noordin Hassan Dalam Esei dan Kritikan. Kuala Lumpur: DBP, 2004
