= Linda Christanty =

Indonesian author and journalist

Linda Christanty (born 18 March 1970) is an Indonesian author and journalist.

Christanty was born in Bangka Island, at the island province of Bangka Belitung.

She won the 2013 S.E.A Write Award.

== Works ==
Some of her books are:

- Kuda Terbang Maria Pinto/Maria Pinto’s Flying Horse (short stories, 2004)
- Dari Jawa Menuju Atjeh: Politik, Islam dan Gay/From Java to Atjeh: Politic, Islam and Gay (essays, 2008)
- Rahasia Selma/Selma’s Secret (short stories, 2010)
- Jangan Tulis Kami Teroris/Don’t Write that We Are Terrorists/Schreib ja nicht, dass wir Terroristen sind! (essays, 2011)
- Seekor Anjing Mati di Bala Murghab/A Dog Died in Bala Murghab (short stories, 2012)
- Seekor Burung Kecil Biru di Naha: Konflik, Tragedi, Rekonsiliasi/A Little Blue Bird in Naha: Conflict, Tragedy, Reconciliation (2015).

== Awards ==
- The Kompas Daily Best Short Story ("Daun-Daun Kering", 1989)
- Human Rights Award for Best Essay ("Militarism and Violence in East Timor", 1998).
- Khatulistiwa Literary Award (Kuda Terbang Maria Pinto, 2004 and Rahasia Selma, 2010)
- Indonesian Language Center Award of the Ministry of National Education (Dari Jawa Menuju Atjeh, 2010 and Seekor Anjing Mati di Bala Murghab, 2013)
- S.E.A Write Award (Southeast Asian Writers Award), 2013
