= Oka Rusmini =

Indonesian writer and poet

- Born: Ida Ayu Oka Rusmini; Jakarta, Indonesia
- Education: Literature, Udayana University
- Occupations: Writer, journalist
- Spouse: Arif Bagus Prasetyo
- Children: Pasha Renaisan
- Writing career
- Language: Indonesian
- Period: Reform Era Generation (1994–present)
- Genres: poetry, novel, children's story, short story, essay
- Subject: women in the Balenese patriarchal society
- Notable work: Dance of the Earth
- Notable awards: S.E.A. Write Award (2012), Khatulistiwa Literary Award (2014), etc

Ida Ayu Oka Rusmini, known as Oka Rusmini, is an Indonesian poet and novelist. She is a recipient of the S.E.A. Write Award.

== Biography ==
She was born in Jakarta, Indonesia. Her writing is characteristic of the condition of women in the patriarchal culture in traditional society. Oka has to her credit collections of short stories, poems and novels. Oka's poem has also been included along with twelve other Balinese contributors in a book entitled Bali Living in Two Worlds, edited by Urs Ramseyer from the Museum der Kulturen Basel in Switzerland.

Oka has also served as the fashion editor in the Bali Post, the largest local newspaper in Bali. She has been speaking at various national and international literary forums, such as the Ubud Writers and Readers Festival in Bali; the Pulpit Poet 21st Century at Taman Ismail Marzuki, Jakarta in 1996; ASEAN Writers Writing Program, 1997; International Poetry Festival, Surakarta, 2002 and that in Denpasar, Bali in 2003. She represented Indonesia at the Winternachten Literature Festival in The Hague and Amsterdam, the Netherlands.

In 2003, she was invited as a guest author at the University of Hamburg, Germany.

== Awards ==
In 1994, she won the best short story prize for her entry "Putu Menolong Tuhan" in the Femina magazine, which was also translated as "Putu Helps his God" by Vern Cork and included in a book Bali Behind the Seen, published in Australia. In the same magazine, her novel "Sagra" won the prize for the novel category.

This was followed by the Horizon literary magazine best short story award for her collection of stories entitled "Pemahat Abad", translated as The Sculptor of the Century, between the periods of 1999–2000. Her short story "The Century Carver" has been translated into English by Pamela Allen. Poetry Journal awarded her with the best poetry in 2002.

In 2003, her novel Tarian Bumi, "Dance of the Earth" was hailed as the "Work Honorees Writing Literature 2003" by the Ministry of Education, Language Centre, Indonesia. The novel has been translated in German and is in process to be translated into English by Lontar Foundation.

== Publications ==
- Rusmini, Oka (1997). Monolog Pohon: 30 Sajak [Monologue Tree] (in Indonesian). Denpasar: Griya Budaya. OCLC 68081169.
- Utan Kayu: Tafseer in Games (1998)
- Bali: The Morning After (Australia, 2000)
- Rusmini, Oka (2001). Sagra (in Indonesian). Magelang: IndonesiaTera. ISBN 978-979-9375-43-8. OCLC 48266060. ISBN 979-9375-43-6.
- Rusmini, Oka (2001). Bali: living in two worlds : a critical self-portrait. Germany: Museum der Kulturen Basel. ISBN 978-3-7965-1873-7. OCLC 49847870. ISBN 3-7965-1873-7.
- Rusmini, Oka (2003). Kenanga (in Indonesian). Indonesia: Gramedia Widiasarana. ISBN 978-979-732-168-0. OCLC 52757274. ISBN 979-732-168-1.
- Rusmini, Oka (2003). Patiwangi (in Indonesian). Jogjakarta, Jakarta: Bentang Budaya. ISBN 978-979-3062-96-9. OCLC 53059140. ISBN 979-3062-96-7.
- Boxwood (2003)
- Rusmini, Oka (2004). Malaikat biru kota Hobart : suara dari Bali (in Indonesian). Jogjakarta: Logung Pustaka : Akar Indonesia. OCLC 58536543.
- McGlynn, John (2006). Menagerie: Indonesian fiction, poetry, photographs, essays, Volume 4. Jakarta: Lontar Foundation.
- Rusmini, Oka (2007). Warna kita : seratus puisi pilihan (in Indonesian). Jakarta: Gramedia Widiasarana Indonesia. ISBN 978-979-759-710-8. OCLC 138344720. ISBN 979-759-710-5.
- Rusmini, Oka (2007). Erdentanz [Roman aus Bali] (in German). Germany: Bad Honnef Horlemann. ISBN 978-3-89502-234-0. OCLC 188168178. ISBN 3-89502-234-9.
- Rusmini, Oka (2007). Tarian bumi : sebuah novel [Dance of the Earth] (in Indonesian). Jakarta: Gramedia Pustaka Utama. ISBN 978-979-22-2877-9. OCLC 169896533. ISBN 979-22-2877-2.
- Rusmini, Oka (2008). Pandora : kumpulan puisi (in Indonesian). Jakarta: Gramedia Widiasarana Indonesia. OCLC 271872265.
- Rusmini, Oka (2009). Kundangdya (in Indonesian). Jakarta: Pusat Bahasa, Departemen Pendidikan Nasional. ISBN 978-979-685-965-8. OCLC 599052170. ISBN 979-685-965-3.
- Rusmini, Oka (2010). Tempurung (in Indonesian). Jakarta: Gramedia Widiasarana Indonesia. ISBN 978-979-081-063-1. OCLC 645787765. ISBN 979-081-063-6.
- Color We (2007)
- The Century Carver (2009)
