= List of literary movements =

Literary movements are a way to divide literature into categories of similar philosophical, topical, or aesthetic features, as opposed to divisions by genre or period. Like other categorizations, literary movements provide language for comparing and discussing literary works. These terms are helpful for curricula or anthologies.

Some of these movements (such as Dada and Beat) were defined by the members themselves, while other terms (for example, the metaphysical poets) emerged decades or centuries after the periods in question. Further, some movements are well defined and distinct, while others, like expressionism, are nebulous and overlap with other definitions. Because of these differences, literary movements are often a point of contention between scholars.

== Table ==
This is a table list of modern literary movements: that is, movements after the Renaissance literature. Ordering is approximate, as there is considerable overlap. Notable authors ordering is predominantly by precedence.

Movement	Description	Notable authors
Renaissance literature	The literature within the general Western movement of the Renaissance united by the spirit of Renaissance humanism, which arose in the 14th-century Italy and continued until the mid-17th century in England	Petrarch, Giovanni Boccaccio, Janus Pannonius, Baptista Mantuanus, Jacopo Sannazaro, Niccolò Machiavelli, Ludovico Ariosto, François Rabelais, Jorge de Montemor, Miguel de Cervantes, Thomas Wyatt, Edmund Spenser, William Shakespeare, Georg Rudolf Weckherlin
The Makars or Scottish Chaucerians	The term has been specifically used to refer to a movement of number of court poets of the 15th and 16th century Scots-language literature in the period of the Northern Renaissance. Figures such as William Drummond who wrote in English might loosely be seen as forming a continuation into the 17th century	Robert Henryson, Walter Kennedy, William Dunbar, Gavin Douglas, David Lyndsay, Alexander Montgomerie
Mannerism	A 16th-century movement and style that emerged in the later Italian High Renaissance. Mannerism in literature is notable for its elegant, highly florid style and intellectual sophistication	Michelangelo, Clément Marot, Giovanni della Casa, Giovanni Battista Guarini, Torquato Tasso, Veronica Franco, Miguel de Cervantes
Petrarchism	A 16th-century movement of Petrarch's style followers, partially coincident with Mannerism	Pietro Bembo, Michelangelo, Mellin de Saint-Gelais, Vittoria Colonna, Clément Marot, Garcilaso de la Vega, Giovanni della Casa, Thomas Wyatt, Henry Howard, Joachim du Bellay, Edmund Spenser, Philip Sidney, Bálint Balassi
Grobianism	A particular movement in 16th-century German literature that parodied moralizing works and ridiculed in the most extreme caricatures the imitation of Romanesque fashions by gentle circles. The Grobianus Tischzucht (1538) and Friedrich Dedekind's Grobianus (1549) works give their name to Grobianism	Friedrich Dedekind, Johann Fischart
Castalian Band	A Scottish Renaissance grouping of court poets, or makars, and musicians headed by the King at the end of the 16th century. Their proficient use of sometimes highly mannered verce forms makes them forerunners to Scottish and English Baroque	Alexander Montgomerie, William Fowler, John Stewart, William Alexander
Baroque	A variable 17th-century pan-European art movement that replaced Mannerism and involved several, especially, early 17th-century literary schools. The Baroque characterised by its use of ornamentation, extended metaphor and wordplay	Giambattista Marino, Lope de Vega, John Donne, Vincent Voiture, Pedro Calderón de la Barca, Georges and Madeleine de Scudéry, Georg Philipp Harsdörffer, John Milton, Andreas Gryphius, Christian Hoffmann von Hoffmannswaldau, Hans Jakob Christoffel von Grimmelshausen
Marinism	This 17th-century followed Mannerism Italian Baroque poetic school and techniques of Giambattista Marino and his followers was based on its use of extravagant and excessive extended metaphor and lavish descriptions	Giambattista Marino, Cesare Rinaldi, Bartolomeo Tortoletti, Emanuele Tesauro, Francesco Pona, Francesco Maria Santinelli
Conceptismo	A 17th-century Baroque movement in the Spanish literature, a similar to the Marinism	Francisco de Quevedo, Baltasar Gracián
Culteranismo	Another 17th-century Spanish Baroque movement, in contrast to Conceptismo, characterized by an ornamental, ostentatious vocabulary and highly latinate syntax	Luis de Góngora, Hortensio Félix Paravicino, Conde de Villamediana, Juana Inés de la Cruz
Précieuses	The main features of this 17th-century French Baroque movement, similar to the Spanish culteranismo and English euphuism, are the refined prose and poetry language of aristocratic salons, periphrases, hyperbole, and puns on the theme of gallant love	Honoré d'Urfé, Vincent Voiture, Jean-Louis Guez de Balzac, Charles Cotin, Antoine Godeau, Madeleine de Scudéry, Isaac de Benserade, Paul Pellisson, Madame d'Aulnoy, Henriette-Julie de Murat
Metaphysical poets	A 17th-century English Baroque school using extended conceit, often (though not always) about religion	John Donne, George Herbert, Andrew Marvell
Cavalier Poets	17th-century English Baroque royalist poets, writing primarily about courtly love, called Sons of Ben (after Ben Jonson)	Richard Lovelace, William Davenant
Euphuism	A peculiar mannered style of Baroque English prose, richly decorated with rhetorical questions	Thomas Lodge, John Lyly
Classicism or Neoclassicism	A 17th–18th centuries Western cultural movement that partially coexisted with the Baroque, coincided with the Age of Enlightenment and drew inspiration from the qualities of proportion of the major works of classical ancient Greek and Latin literature	Pierre Corneille, Molière, Jean Racine, John Dryden, William Wycherley, William Congreve, Jonathan Swift, Joseph Addison, Alexander Pope, Voltaire, Carlo Goldoni, Friedrich Gottlieb Klopstock, Gotthold Ephraim Lessing
Amatory fiction	Romantic fiction popular around 1660 to 1730; notable for preceding the modern novel form and producing several prominent female authors	Eliza Haywood, Delarivier Manley, Aphra Behn
The Augustans	An 18th-century literary movement based chiefly on classical ideals, satire and skepticism	Alexander Pope, Jonathan Swift
Rococo	Also known as Late Baroque, the final expression of the Baroque movement that began in France in the 1730s and characterized by a cheerful lightness and intimacy of tone, and an elegant playfulness in erotic light poetry and principally small literary forms	Anne Claude de Caylus, Alexandre Masson de Pezay, Évariste de Parny, Jean-Baptiste Louvet de Couvray, Paolo Rolli, Pietro Metastasio, Friedrich von Hagedorn, Johann Wilhelm Ludwig Gleim, Johann Uz, Johann Nikolaus Götz, Christoph Martin Wieland
Sentimentalism	Literary sentimentalism arose during the 18th century, partly as a response to sentimentalism in philosophy. In 18th-century England, the sentimental novel was a major literary genre. The movement was one of roots of Romanticism	Edward Young, James Thomson, Laurence Sterne, Thomas Gray, Jean-Jacques Rousseau, Friedrich Gottlieb Klopstock, Christian Heinrich Spiess
Gothic fiction	Horror fiction existed from 1760s in which the atmosphere is typically claustrophobic, and common plot elements include vengeful persecution, imprisonment, and murder with interest in the supernatural and in violence	Horace Walpole, Clara Reeve, Ann Radcliffe, Bram Stoker, Edgar Allan Poe, Mary Shelley, Christian Heinrich Spiess
Sturm und Drang	From 1767 till 1785, a precursor to the Romanticism, it is named for a play by Friedrich Maximilian Klinger. Its literature often features a protagonist which is driven by emotion, impulse and other motives that run counter to the enlightenment rationalism.	Johann Wolfgang von Goethe, Friedrich Schiller, Friedrich Maximilian von Klinger, Jakob Michael Reinhold Lenz, Heinrich Leopold Wagner
Weimar Classicism	In contrast with the contemporaneous German Romanticism, the practitioners of Weimar Classicism (1788–1805) established the synthesis of ideas from pre-Romanticism of Sturm und Drang, Romanticism, and Classicism	Johann Wolfgang von Goethe, Friedrich Schiller, Caroline von Wolzogen
Pyreneanism	A 19th century sporting, artistic, and literary movement centered around exploring the Pyrenees in order to create works inspired by the experience, whether for contemplative, artistic, or scientific purposes. The term was coined in 1898 by the scholar Henri Beraldi in his book Cent ans aux Pyrénées (transl. A Hundred Years in the Pyrenees), where he described a specific way of engaging with the Pyrenean mountains.	Louis Ramond de Carbonnières, Anne Lister, Charles Packe, Henry Russell, Eugène Trutat, Franz Schrader, Henri Lefebvre
Romanticism	A 19th-century (ca. 1800 to 1860) movement emphasizing emotion and imagination, rather than logic and scientific thought. Response to the Enlightenment	Jean Paul, Novalis, Washington Irving, Lord Byron, Mary Shelley, Alexander Pushkin, Victor Hugo, Nathaniel Hawthorne, Camilo Castelo Branco, Adam Mickiewicz, José de Alencar
Dark romanticism	A style within Romanticism. Finds man inherently sinful and self-destructive and nature a dark, mysterious force	E. T. A. Hoffmann, Ludwig Tieck, Edgar Allan Poe, Nathaniel Hawthorne, Herman Melville, Edwin Arlington Robinson
Lake Poets	A group of Romantic poets from the English Lake District who wrote about nature and the sublime	William Wordsworth, Samuel Taylor Coleridge, Robert Southey
Nahda or Arab Renaissance	Beginning in the 19th century cultural and literary movement of some primarily Egyptian, Lebanese and Syrian Arabic writers and poets believed that writing must be renewed towards modern style and themes	Rifa'a at-Tahtawi, Ahmad Faris al-Shidyaq, Butrus al-Bustani, Francis Marrash
Pre-Raphaelites	Founded in 1848, primarily English movement based ostensibly on undoing innovations by the painter Raphael. Many were both painters and poets	Dante Gabriel Rossetti, Christina Rossetti
Transcendentalism	From the mid-19th-century American movement: poetry and philosophy concerned with self-reliance, independence from modern technology	Ralph Waldo Emerson, Henry David Thoreau
Realism	The mid-19th-century movement based on a simplification of style and image and an interest in poverty and everyday concerns	Gustave Flaubert, Stendhal, Giuseppe Gioachino Belli, Honoré de Balzac, Nikolai Gogol, Fyodor Dostoevsky, Leo Tolstoy, William Dean Howells, Anton Chekhov, Frank Norris, Machado de Assis, Eça de Queiroz
Naturalism	The late 19th century proponents of this movement believe heredity and environment control people	Émile Zola, Stephen Crane, Guy de Maupassant, Henrik Ibsen, Aluísio Azevedo
Verismo	Verismo is a derivative of naturalism and realism that began in post-unification Italy. Verismo literature uses detailed character development based on psychology, in Giovanni Verga's words 'the science of the human heart.'	Giosuè Carducci, Giovanni Verga, Luigi Capuana, Matilde Serao, Cesare Pascarella, Grazia Deledda
Social realism	A type of realism, not to be confused with socialist realism, which depicted the socio-political problems and domestic situations of working class. Some its movements include: Natural school; Proletarian literature; Angry young men (kitchen sink realism)	Ivan Turgenev, Bernard Shaw, H. G. Wells, Maxim Gorky, Theodore Dreiser, Jaroslav Hašek, Lu Xun, Guo Moruo, Yoshiki Hayama, Kenneth Fearing, Erskine Caldwell, John Osborne, Kingsley Amis, Stan Barstow
Socialist realism	Socialist realism is a subset of realist art which focuses on communist values and realist depiction. It developed in the Soviet Union and was imposed as state policy by Joseph Stalin in 1934, though authors in other socialist countries and members of the communist party in non-socialist countries also partook in the movement	Maxim Gorky, Valentin Kataev, Leonid Leonov, Alexander Fadeyev, Nikolai Ostrovsky, Mikhail Sholokhov, Lu Xun, Takiji Kobayashi, Mike Gold, Rasul Gamzatov
American realism	A national variety of realism often having the character of protecting the American type of development and way of life	Mark Twain, William Dean Howells, Ambrose Bierce, Stephen Crane, Theodore Dreiser, Margaret Deland, Jack London, Erskine Caldwell, J. D. Salinger
Dirty realism	In the 1980s North America emerged, a related to Minimalism movement that said to depict the seamier or more mundane aspects of ordinary life of unemployed cowboys, waitresses in roadside cafes, deserted husbands and such in spare, unadorned language	Charles Bukowski, Carson McCullers, Raymond Carver, Frederick Barthelme, Richard Ford, Tobias Wolff, Pedro Juan Gutiérrez, Larry Brown, Jayne Anne Phillips
Magical realism	A literary style and movement in which magical elements appear in otherwise realistic circumstances. Most often associated with the Latin American literary boom of the 20th century	Gabriel García Márquez, Octavio Paz, Günter Grass, Julio Cortázar, Sadegh Hedayat, Nina Sadur, Mo Yan, Olga Tokarczuk
Neo-Romanticism	The term has been applied to writers, who rejected, abandoned, or opposed realism, naturalism, or avant-garde modernism at various points in time from circa 1850 and incorporated elements from the era of Romanticism	Thomas Mayne Reid, Mór Jókai, Jules Verne, Rudyard Kipling, Robert Louis Stevenson, Rafael Sabatini, Knut Hamsun, Alexander Grin, Jaishankar Prasad, Kahlil Gibran, Konstantin Paustovsky
Decadent movement	In the mid 19th century, decadence came to refer to moral decay, and was attributed as the cause of the fall of great civilizations, like the Roman Empire. The decadent movement was a response to the perceived decadence within the earlier Romantic, naturalist and realist movements in France at this time. The decadent movement takes decadence in literature to an extreme, with characters who debase themselves for pleasure, and the use of metaphor, symbolism and language as tools to obfuscate the truth rather than expose it	Joris-Karl Huysmans, Gustav Flaubert, Charles Baudelaire, Oscar Wilde
Aestheticism	An artistic and literary movement of Victorian era from 1860s related to the decadents that cultivated beauty, rather than didactic purpose, and illustrated by the slogan "art for art's sake"	Dante Gabriel Rossetti, Algernon Charles Swinburne, Walter Pater, Oscar Wilde, A. E. Housman
Parnassianism	A French-origin group of the anti-Romantic poets, mainly occurring prior to symbolism during the 1860s–1890s that strove for exact and faultless workmanship	Théophile Gautier, Leconte de Lisle, Théodore de Banville, Felicjan Medard Faleński, Sully Prudhomme, José-Maria de Heredia, Alberto de Oliveira, Olavo Bilac
American literary regionalism or "local color"	A style, genre or movement of writing in the United States from circa 1865 that speak nostalgically to modern readers. In this style the setting is particularly important and writers often emphasize specific features, such as dialect, customs, history and landscape, of a particular region	George Washington Cable, James Lane Allen, Charles W. Chesnutt, Hamlin Garland, Abraham Cahan, Mary Austin, Willa Cather, Sherwood Anderson, Zitkala-Ša, Zora Neale Hurston, William Faulkner, August Derleth
Franco American literature	According to some scholars, this refers not only to a body of the works by French-Canadian American authors from the last quarter of the 19th century, written in both English and French, but also its associated literary and cultural movement expressions of La Survivance and otherism, which sought to capture their own way of life within Yankee society	Honoré Beaugrand, Louis Dantin, Jacques Ducharme, Jack Kerouac, Grace Metalious, David Plante, Howard Frank Mosher
Symbolism	Principally French movement of the fin de siècle, symbolism is codified by the Symbolist Manifesto in 1886, and focused on the structure of thought rather than poetic form or image; influential for English language poets from Edgar Allan Poe to James Merrill	Charles Baudelaire, Stéphane Mallarmé, Arthur Rimbaud, Paul Valéry, Maurice Maeterlinck, Hugo von Hofmannsthal, Alexandru Macedonski, Cruz e Sousa
Russian symbolism	It arose enough separately from West European symbolism, emphasizing mysticism of Sophiology and defamiliarization	Alexander Blok, Valery Bryusov, Fyodor Sologub, Konstantin Balmont, Andrei Bely
Irish Literary Revival	A movement within Celtic Revival in the late 19th and early 20th century that advocated renaissance of creativity in Irish language	George Sigerson, W. B. Yeats, Roger Casement, Thomas MacDonagh
Modernism	A variegated movement, including modernist poetry, origined in the late 19th century, encompassing primitivism, formal innovation, or reaction to science and technology	Joseph Conrad, Knut Hamsun, Marcel Proust, Gertrude Stein, Thomas Mann, James Joyce, Ezra Pound, H.D., T. S. Eliot, Fernando Pessoa, Karel Čapek, Peter Weiss, Mário de Andrade, João Guimarães Rosa, Rabindranath Tagore
Mahjar	The "émigré school" was a neo-romantic movement within Arabic-language writers in the Americas that appeared at the turn of the 20th century	Ameen Rihani, Kahlil Gibran, Nasib Arida, Mikhail Naimy, Elia Abu Madi, Nadra and Abd al-Masih Haddad
Futurism	An avant-garde, largely Italian and Russian, movement codified in 1909 by the Manifesto of Futurism. Futurists managed to create a new language free of syntax punctuation, and metrics that allowed for free expression	Filippo Tommaso Marinetti, Giovanni Papini, Mina Loy, Aldo Palazzeschi, Velimir Khlebnikov, Almada Negreiros, Vladimir Mayakovsky, Stanisław Młodożeniec, Jaroslav Seifert
Cubo-Futurism	A movement within Russian Futurism with practice of zaum, the experimental visual and sound poetry	David Burliuk, Velimir Khlebnikov, Aleksei Kruchyonykh, Vladimir Mayakovsky
Ego-Futurism	A school within Russian Futurism based on a personality cult	Igor Severyanin, Vasilisk Gnedov
Acmeism	A Russian modernist poetic school, which emerged ca. 1911 and to symbols preferred direct expression through exact images	Nikolay Gumilev, Osip Mandelstam, Mikhail Kuzmin, Anna Akhmatova, Georgiy Ivanov
New Culture Movement	A Chinese movement together with the May Fourth Movement as its part during the 1910s and 1920s that opposed Confusian culture and proclaimed a new culture, including the use of written vernacular Chinese. It clustered in the New Youth literary magazine and Peking University	Chen Duxiu, Lu Xun, Zhou Zuoren, Li Dazhao, Chen Hengzhe, Hu Shih, Yu Pingbo
Stream of consciousness	Early-20th-century fiction consisting of literary representations of quotidian thought, without authorial presence	Dorothy Richardson, Virginia Woolf, James Joyce, William Faulkner
Impressionism	It influenced by the European Impressionist art movement and subsumed into several other categories. The term is used to describe not some movement, but a work of literature characterized by the selection of a few details to convey the sense impressions left by an incident or scene	Joseph Conrad, Stephen Crane, Virginia Woolf, Mykhailo Kotsiubynsky, Aleksey Remizov, Vladimir Nabokov
Expressionism	Part of the larger expressionist movement, literary and theatrical expressionism is an avant-garde movement originating in Germany, which rejects realism in order to depict emotions and subjective thoughts	Franz Kafka, Alfred Döblin, Gottfried Benn, Leonid Andreyev, Heinrich Mann, Oskar Kokoschka
First World War Poets	British poets who documented both the idealism and the horrors of the war and the period in which it took place	Siegfried Sassoon, Rupert Brooke, Wilfred Owen
Imagism	An English-language modernist group founded in 1914 that poetry based on description rather than theme, and on the motto, "the natural object is always the adequate symbol"	Ezra Pound, H.D., Richard Aldington
Dada	Touted by its proponents as anti-art, the Dada avant-garde focused on going against artistic norms and conventions	Jean Arp, Kurt Schwitters, Tristan Tzara
Imaginism	An avantgardist post-Russian Revolution of 1917 poetic movement that created poetry based on sequences of arresting and uncommon images	Sergei Yesenin, Anatoly Marienhof, Rurik Ivnev
The Lost Generation	The term 'Lost Generation' is traditionally attributed to Gertrude Stein and was then popularized by Ernest Hemingway in the epigraph to his novel The Sun Also Rises, and his memoir A Moveable Feast. It refers to a group of American literary notables who lived in Paris and other parts of Europe from the time period which saw the end of World War I to the beginning of the Great Depression	F. Scott Fitzgerald, Ernest Hemingway, Ezra Pound, Waldo Pierce, John Dos Passos
Stridentism	A Mexican artistic avant-garde movement. They exalted modern urban life and social revolution	Manuel Maples Arce, Arqueles Vela, Germán List Arzubide
Harlem Renaissance	African American poets, novelists, and thinkers, often employing elements of blues and folklore, based in the Harlem neighborhood of New York City in the 1920s	Langston Hughes, Zora Neale Hurston
Scottish Renaissance, incl. Scottish Gaelic Renaissance	A modernist, mainly literary, movement of the 1920s to mid-20th century that incorporated folk influences with no nostalgia and a strong concern for the fate of Scotland's declining languages	Hugh MacDiarmid, Edwin Muir, Neil Gunn, George Blake, A. J. Cronin, Naomi Mitchison, William Soutar, Eric Linklater, Lewis Grassic Gibbon, Robert McLellan, Robert Garioch, Sorley Maclean, George Campbell Hay
Jindyworobak movement	The Jindyworobak movement originated in Adelaide, South Australia during the great depression. It sought to preserve uniquely Australian culture from external influence by incorporating Australian aboriginal languages and mythology and unique Australian settings	Rex Ingamells, Xavier Herbert
Surrealism	Originally a French movement, which developed in the 1920s from Dadaism by André Breton with Philippe Soupault and influenced by surrealist painting, that uses surprising images and transitions to play off of formal expectations and depict the unconscious rather than conscious mind (surrealist automatism)	André Breton, Philippe Soupault, Jean Cocteau, José María Hinojosa Lasarte, Sadegh Hedayat, Mário Cesariny, Haruki Murakami
OBERIU	A short-lived influential Soviet Russian avantgardist art group in Leningrad from 1927 to repressions in 1931, which held provocative performances, that foreshadowed the European theatre of the absurd, nonsensical illogical absurd verse and prose	Daniil Kharms, Alexander Vvedensky, Nikolay Zabolotsky, Nikolay Oleynikov, Konstantin Vaginov, Evgeny Schwartz
Los Contemporáneos	A Mexican vanguardist group, active in the late 1920s and early 1930s; published an eponymous literary magazine which served as the group's mouthpiece and artistic vehicle from 1928 to 1931	Xavier Villaurrutia, Salvador Novo
Négritude	A cultural, literary and political movement mainly developed by a francophone elite in the African diaspora during the 1930s, aimed at raising and cultivating "black consciousness"; the writers drew heavily on a surrealist literary style	Paulette and Jeanne Nardal, Léopold Senghor, Abdoulaye Sadji, Léon Damas, Aimé Césaire
Villa Seurat Network	A group of left and anarchist writers living in Paris in the 1930s, largely influenced by Surrealism	Henry Miller, Lawrence Durrell, Anaïs Nin, Alfred Perles
Objectivism	A loose-knit modernist mainly American group from the 1930s. Objectivists treated the poem as an object; they emphasised sincerity, intelligence, and the clarity of the poet's vision	Louis Zukofsky, Lorine Niedecker, Charles Reznikoff, George Oppen, Carl Rakosi, Basil Bunting
Southern Agrarians	A group of Southern American poets, based originally at Vanderbilt University, who expressly repudiated many modernist developments in favor of metrical verse and narrative. Some Southern Agrarians were also associated with the New Criticism	John Crowe Ransom, Robert Penn Warren
Postcolonialism	A diverse, loosely connected movement within the contemporary literature, writers from former colonies of European countries, whose work is frequently politically charged	Jamaica Kincaid, V. S. Naipaul, Derek Walcott, Salman Rushdie, Giannina Braschi, Wole Soyinka, Chinua Achebe
Afro-Surrealism	An art and literary movement primarily in the African diaspora, inspired by Négritude and postcolonial literature and partially coinciding with them	Léopold Senghor, Aimé Césaire, Bob Kaufman, Ted Joans, Will Alexander, Nalo Hopkinson, Tananarive Due, Junot Díaz, Edwidge Danticat, Colson Whitehead, Krista Franklin, Helen Oyeyemi
Afrofuturism	From mid 20th-century cultural movement that explores the intersection of the African diaspora culture with science and technology. Literary Afrofuturism is most commonly associated with science fiction.	Samuel R. Delany, Nancy Farmer, Octavia E. Butler
Black Mountain poets	A self-identified avant-garde group of poets, originally, from the 1950, based at Black Mountain College, who eschewed patterned form in favor of the rhythms and inflections of the human voice	Charles Olson, Denise Levertov, Robert Creeley
Absurdism	The absurdist movement is derived in the 1950s from Absurdist literature and philosophy, which argues that life is inherently purposeless and questions truth and value. As such, absurdist literature and theatre of the absurd often includes dark humor, satire, and incongruity	Jean-Paul Sartre, Samuel Beckett, Arthur Adamov, Albert Camus, Imre Kertész, Gao Xingjian
The Movement	A 1950s group of English anti-romantic and rational writers	Kingsley Amis, Philip Larkin, Donald Alfred Davie, D. J. Enright, John Wain, Elizabeth Jennings, Robert Conquest
Nouveau roman	The "new novelists", appeared in French literature in the 1950s, generally rejected the traditional use of chronology, plot and character in novel, as well as the omniscient narrator, and focused on the vision of thins	Alain Robbe-Grillet, Claude Simon, Nathalie Sarraute, Michel Butor, Robert Pinget, Marguerite Duras, Jean Ricardou
Concrete poetry	The Concrete poetry was an avantgardist movement started in Brazil during the 1950s, characterized for extinguishing the general conception of poetry, creating a new language called ''verbivocovisual''	Augusto de Campos, Haroldo de Campos, Décio Pignatari
Beats	An American movement of the 1950s and 1960s concerned with counterculture and youthful alienation Its British variety were the 1960s Liverpool poets	Jack Kerouac, Allen Ginsberg, William S. Burroughs, Ken Kesey, Gregory Corso
Confessional poetry	American poetry that emerged in the late 1950s, often brutally, exposes the self as part of an aesthetic of the beauty and power of human frailty	Robert Lowell, Sylvia Plath, Alicia Ostriker
Village Prose	A movement in Soviet literature beginning during the Khrushchev Thaw, which included works that cultivated nostalgia of rural life	Valentin Ovechkin, Alexander Yashin, Fyodor Abramov, Boris Mozhayev, Viktor Astafyev, Vladimir Soloukhin, Vasily Shukshin, Vasily Belov, Valentin Rasputin
Soviet nonconformism	A dissident, stylistically diverse artistic "movement" in the post-Stalinist era Soviet Union from 1950s to 1980s in opposition to official socialist realism	Vasily Grossman, Varlam Shalamov, Yury Dombrovsky, Viktor Nekrasov, Aleksandr Solzhenitsyn, Alexander Zinoviev, Vasily Aksyonov, Vladimir Voinovich, Andrei Bitov, Venedikt Yerofeyev, Joseph Brodsky, Dmitry Prigov, Sergei Dovlatov, Sasha Sokolov
Oulipo	Founded in 1960 French poetry and prose group based on seemingly arbitrary rules for the sake of added challenge	Raymond Queneau, Walter Abish, Georges Perec, Italo Calvino
Postmodernism	Contemporary movement, emerged strongly in the 1960s U.S., skeptical of absolutes and embracing diversity, irony, and word play	Kathy Acker, John Barth, Jorge Luis Borges, Philip K. Dick, William Gaddis, Alasdair Gray, Thomas Pynchon, Subimal Mishra, Sasha Sokolov, Samir Roychoudhury, Kurt Vonnegut, Yukio Mishima, Bret Easton Ellis
Hungry generation	A literary movement in postcolonial India (Kolkata) during 1961–65 as a counter-discourse to Colonial Bengali poetry	Shakti Chattopadhyay, Malay Roy Choudhury, Binoy Majumdar, Samir Roychoudhury, Debi Roy, Sandipan Chattopadhyay, Subimal Basak
Black Arts Movement	An African-American-led art and literary movement that was active during the 1960s and 1970s and related to Black Power politics	Dudley Randall, Gwendolyn Brooks, Rosa Guy, Maya Angelou, Amiri Baraka, Henry Dumas, Audre Lorde, Sonia Sanchez, Larry Neal, Ishmael Reed, Haki R. Madhubuti, Nikki Giovanni
New York School	Urban, gay or gay-friendly, leftist poets, writers, and painters of the 1960s	Frank O'Hara, John Ashbery
New Wave	The New Wave is a movement in science fiction produced in the 1960s and 1970s and characterized by a high degree of experimentation, both in form and in content, a "literary" or artistic sensibility, and a focus on "soft" as opposed to hard science. New Wave writers often saw themselves as part of the modernist tradition and sometimes mocked the traditions of pulp science fiction, which some of them regarded as stodgy, adolescent and poorly written	John Brunner, M. John Harrison, Norman Spinrad, Barrington J. Bayley, Thomas M. Disch
Minimalism	In the late 1960s and '70s U.S. emerged, an avantgardist artistic, dramatic and literary movement is characterized by an economy with words and a focus on surface description.	Samuel Beckett, Grace Paley, Raymond Carver, Frederick Barthelme, Richard Ford, Mary Robison, Amy Hempel, Jon Fosse
British Poetry Revival	A loose wide-reaching collection of groupings and subgroupings during the late 1960s and early 1970s. It was a modernist reaction to the conservative The Movement	J. H. Prynne, Eric Mottram, Tom Raworth, Denise Riley, Lee Harwood
Language poets	An avantgardist group or tendency in American poetry that emerged in the late 1960s and early 1970s with the poem as a construction in and of language itself	Bernadette Mayer, Leslie Scalapino, Stephen Rodefer, Bruce Andrews, Charles Bernstein
Misty Poets	The Misty Poets were Chinese poets who resisted state artistic restrictions imposed during the Cultural Revolution since 1970s. They made use of metaphors and hermetic imagery and avoided objective facts	Bei Dao, Duo Duo, Shu Ting, Yang Lian, Gu Cheng, Hai Zi
Spoken Word	A postmodern literary movement srarted ca. 1970, where writers use their speaking voice to present fiction, poetry, monologues, and storytelling arising from Beat poetry, the Harlem Renaissance, and the civil rights movement in the urban centers of the United States. The textual origins differ and may have been written for print initially then read aloud for audiences	Spalding Gray, Laurie Anderson, Hedwig Gorski, Pedro Pietri, Piri Thomas, Giannina Braschi, Taalam Acey
Moscow Conceptualists	A movement within Soviet nonconformist art emerged during the 1970s and related to western conceptual and neo-conceptual art in which the concept(s) involved in the work are prioritized equally to or more than traditional aesthetic or material concerns. The Moscow group included not only artists but also writers	Dmitry Prigov, Lev Rubinstein, Anna Alchuk, Vladimir Sorokin
Metarealism	Namely metaphysical realism, a movement in the 1970s–90s unofficial postmodern Soviet and Russian literature, whom all members used complex metaphors which they called meta-metaphors	Konstantin Kedrov, Viktor Krivulin, Elena Shvarts, Yuri Arabov, Alexei Parshchikov
New Formalism	A movement originating ca. 1977 in American poetry advocating a return to traditional accentual-syllabic verse	Dana Gioia, X.J. Kennedy, Brad Leithauser, Molly Peacock, Mary Jo Salter, Timothy Steele
Performance poetry	This is the lasting viral component of Spoken Word and one of the most popular forms of poetry in the 21st century. It is a new oral poetry originating in the 1980s in Austin, Texas, using the speaking voice and other theatrical elements. Practitioners write for the speaking voice instead of writing poetry for the silent printed page. The major figure is American Hedwig Gorski who began broadcasting live radio poetry with East of Eden Band during the early 1980s. Gorski, considered a post-Beat, created the term "Performance Poetry" to define and distinguish what she and the band did from performance art. Instead of books, poets use audio recordings and digital media along with television spawning Slam Poetry and Def Poets on television and Broadway	Beau Sia, Hedwig Gorski, Bob Holman, Marc Smith, David Antin, Taalam Acey
New Sincerity, a.k.a. Postpostmodernism	A cultural movement and trend that matured in the 1990s within Postmodernism, primarily in America, preferring sincerity ethos to the hegemony of postmodernist irony and cynicism	David Foster Wallace, Marilynne Robinson, Jonathan Franzen, Victor Pelevin, Michael Chabon, Dave Eggers, Stephen Graham Jones, Zadie Smith
In-yer-face theatre	A performing arts movement born in the United Kingdom in the 1990s, based on confrontational material designed to shock the audience, often with a political background.	Sarah Kane, Mark Ravenhill, Anthony Neilson
Sastra wangi	A label for the movement of Indonesian literature started circa 2000 and written by young, urban Indonesian women who take on controversial issues such as politics, religion and sexuality	Ayu Utami, Djenar Maesa Ayu, Dewi "Dee" Lestari, Fira Basuki, Nova Riyanti Yusuf
Neo-Decadence	An artistic movement which, though influenced by the aesthetic ideology of the Decadent movement, might be seen as much as a reaction against other trends in contemporary literature as a resurrection of the original movement. In general, Neo-Decadence has more in common with avant-garde literary movements (Symbolism, Decadence and Futurism) than with genre fiction categories such as speculative fiction or horror, with which it is often compared	Brendan Connell, Quentin S. Crisp, Justin Isis
Electronic literature	A wide ranging literary form encompassing other genres but using electronic elements (games, navigation, sound, images, etc) to add meaning	M.D. Coverley, John Cayley, Shelley Jackson, Stephanie Strickland

== See also ==
- List of poetry groups and movements

== Main sources ==
- Baldick, Chris (2015). The Oxford Dictionary of Literary Terms (Online Version) (4th ed.). Oxford University Press. ISBN 978-0-19-178323-4.
- Greene, Roland; et al., eds. (2012). The Princeton Encyclopedia of Poetry and Poetics (4th rev. ed.). Princeton, NJ: Princeton University Press. ISBN 978-0-691-15491-6.
- Milne, Ira Mark (2009). Literary Movements for Students: Presenting Analysis, Context, and Criticism on Literary Movements (2nd ed.). Detroit, Mi: Gale. ISBN 978-1-4144-3719-4.
