= Contemporary literature =

Literary genre generally set after World War II

Contemporary literature is literature which is generally set after World War II and coincident with contemporary history. Subgenres of contemporary literature include contemporary romance and others.

== History ==
Literary movements are always contemporary to the writer discussing the work of their day. Here what have been recently "contemporary" are listed by decade. The list should not be assumed to be comprehensive.

=== 1940s ===
- Postcolonialism

=== 1950s ===
- Absurdism
- Afrofuturism
- Afro-Surrealism
- Beat Generation
- Black Mountain poets
- Concrete poetry
- Confessional poetry
- The Movement
- Nouveau roman
- Oulipo
- San Francisco Renaissance
- Soviet nonconformism

=== 1960s ===
- Postmodernism
- Black Arts Movement
- British Poetry Revival
- Hungry generation
- Language poets
- New Wave
- New York School

=== 1970s ===
- Misty Poets
- New Formalism
- Spoken Word

=== 1980s ===
- Cyberpunk
- Maximalism
- Performance Poetry
- Poetry slam

=== 1990s ===
- New sincerity
- Post cyber punk

=== 2000s ===
- Neo-Decadence
- New Weird
- Sastra wangi

== See also ==
- 2026 in literature
- Modernist literature
- Twentieth-century English literature
- 20th century in literature
- 21st century in literature
- 2000s in books
