= Bezděkov (Klatovy District) =

- Municipality
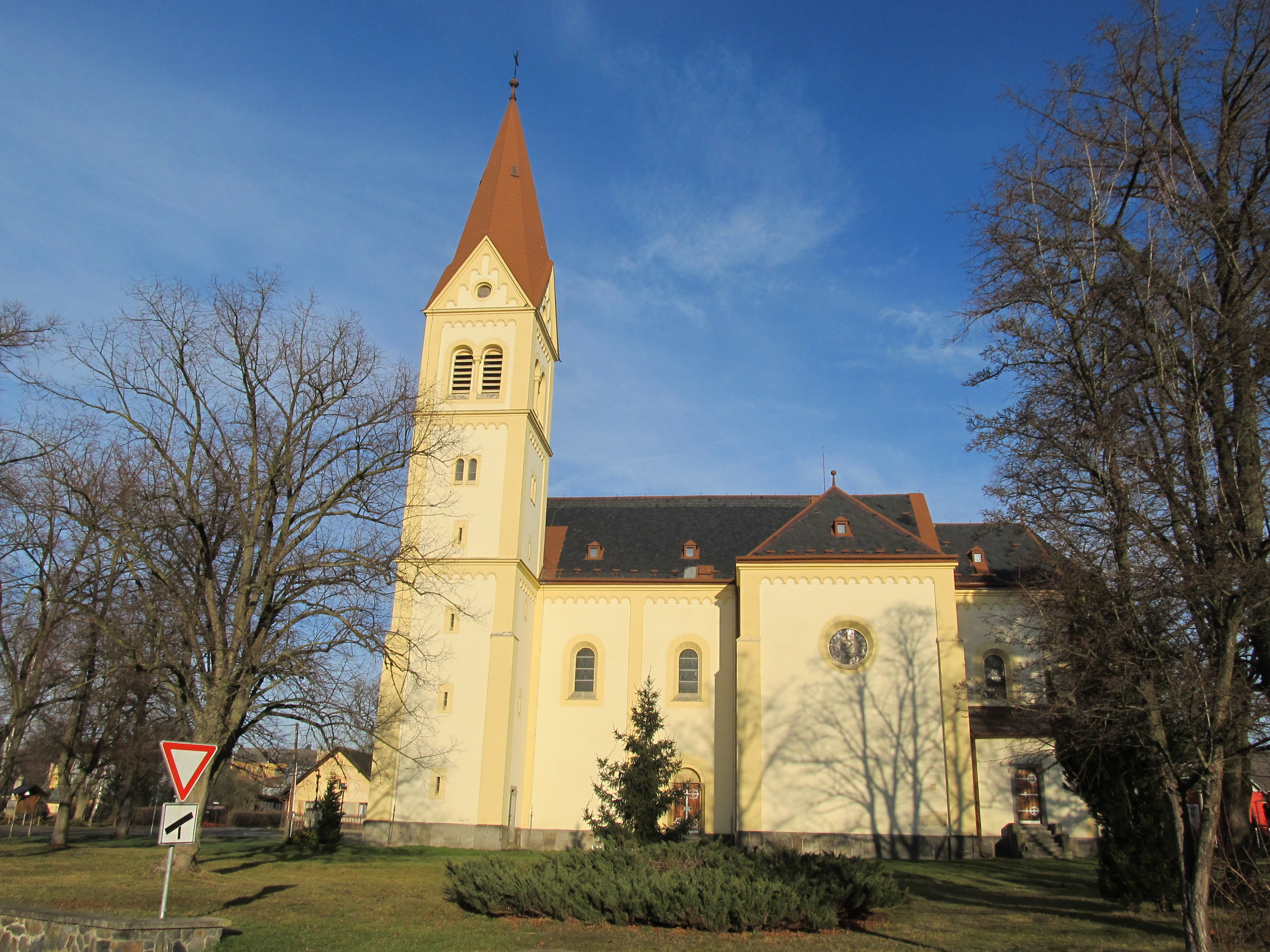
- Church of Saint Wenceslaus

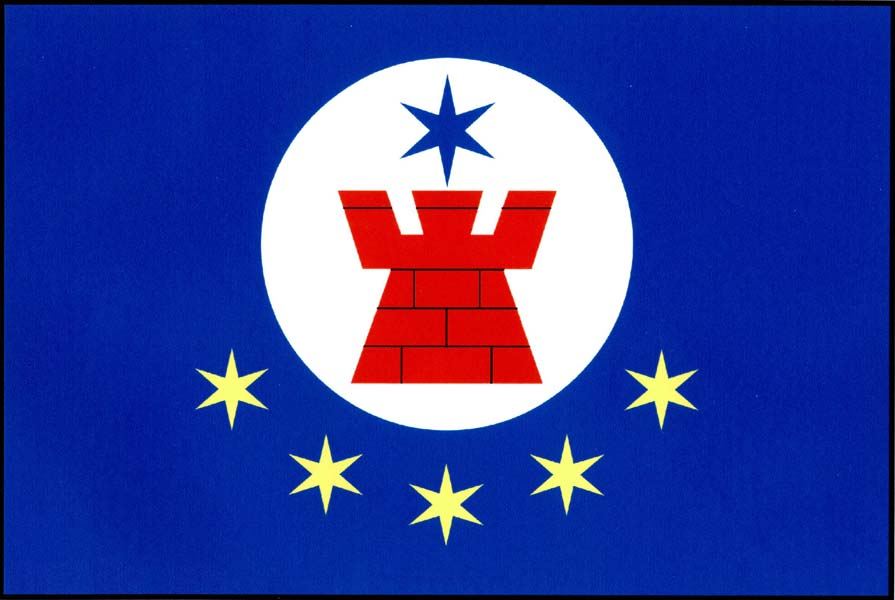
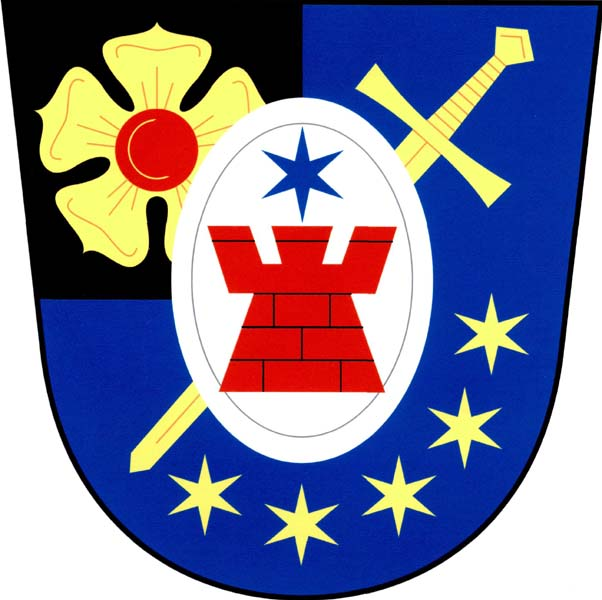
- Flag Coat of arms

- Location in the Czech Republic
- Coordinates: 49°22′51″N 13°13′39″E
- Country: Czech Republic
- Region: Plzeň
- District: Klatovy
- First mentioned: 1331

Area
  - Total: 14.92 km^{2} (5.76 sq mi)
- Elevation: 412 m (1,352 ft)

Population (2026-01-01)
  - Total: 962
  - Density: 64.5/km^{2} (167/sq mi)
- Time zone: UTC+1 (CET)
  - Summer (DST): UTC+2 (CEST)
- Postal code: 339 01
- Website: www.bezdekov.cz

Bezděkov (German: Besdiekau) is a municipality and village in Klatovy District in the Plzeň Region of the Czech Republic. It has about 1,000 inhabitants.

== Administrative division ==
Bezděkov consists of six municipal parts (in brackets population according to the 2021 census):

- Bezděkov (605)
- Koryta (156)
- Poborovice (56)
- Struhadlo (36)
- Tetětice (29)
- Vítaná (38)

== Etymology ==
The name is derived from the personal name Bezděk, meaning "Bezděk's (court)".

== Geography ==
Bezděkov is located about 5 km (3 mi) west of Klatovy and 40 km (25 mi) south of Plzeň. It lies in the Švihov Highlands. The highest point is at 695 m (2,280 ft) above sea level, below the summit of Velký Bítov hill. The Úhlava River flows along the eastern municipal border and shortly through the municipality.

== History ==
The first written mention of Bezděkov is from 1331. The village was probably founded in the 13th century.

== Demographics ==
Historical population

Year	Pop.	±%
1869	1,278	—
1880	1,379	+7.9%
1890	1,268	−8.0%
1900	1,287	+1.5%
1910	1,370	+6.4%

Year	Pop.	±%
1921	1,306	−4.7%
1930	1,274	−2.5%
1950	945	−25.8%
1961	940	−0.5%
1970	883	−6.1%

Year	Pop.	±%
1980	836	−5.3%
1991	812	−2.9%
2001	846	+4.2%
2011	949	+12.2%
2021	920	−3.1%

Source: Censuses

== Transport ==
The I/22 road (the section from Klatovy to Domažlice) runs through the municipality.

Bezděkov is located on the main railway line Prague–Železná Ruda via Plzeň and on the regional line Klatovy–Domažlice.

== Sights ==
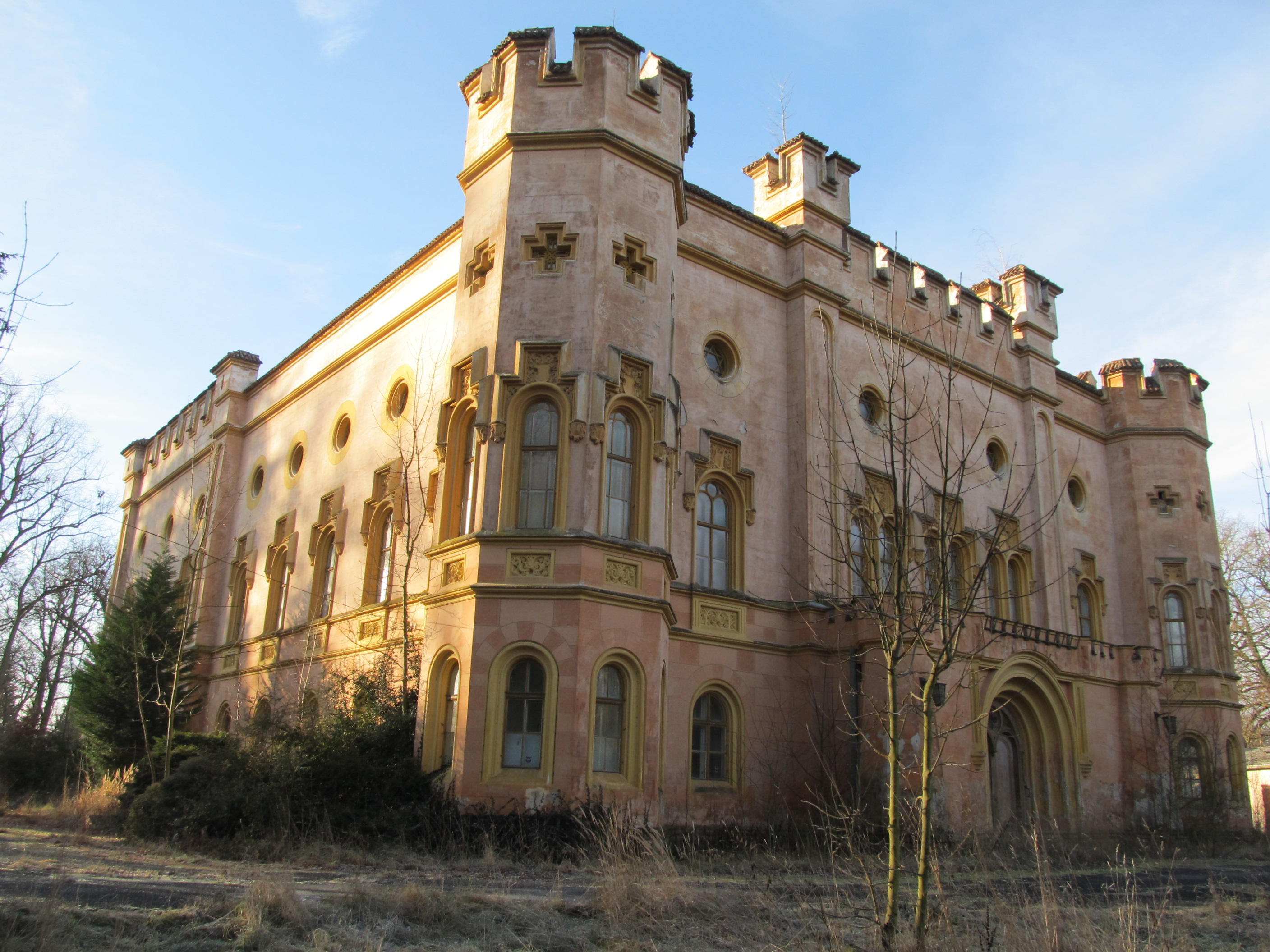
Bezděkov Castle

The main landmark of Bezděkov is the Bezděkov Castle. The original castle was built on the site of an older Gothic fortress in 1737. In 1854–1856, the castle was rebuilt into its current Gothic Revival form by the architect Vojtěch Ignác Ullmann. Today, the castle is privately owned and inaccessible.

The Church of Saint Anne on a hill near Bezděkov dates from 1693. After its capacity became insufficient, the Church of Saint Wenceslaus was built in the centre of the village in 1899–1901. It belongs to the youngest churches in the region.

== Notable people ==
- Christian Heinrich Spiess (1755–1799), German writer; lived and died here

== Gallery ==
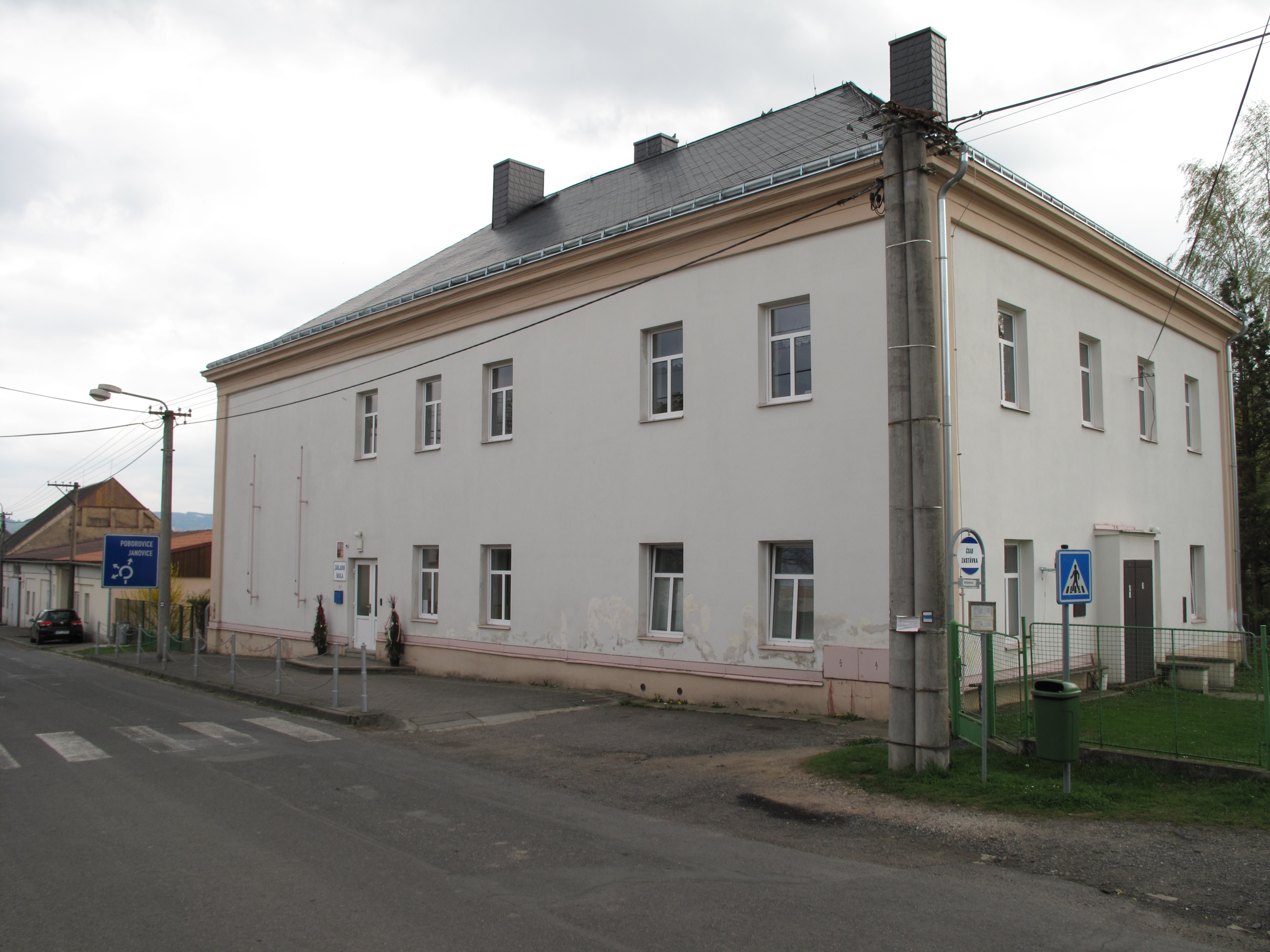
Primary school

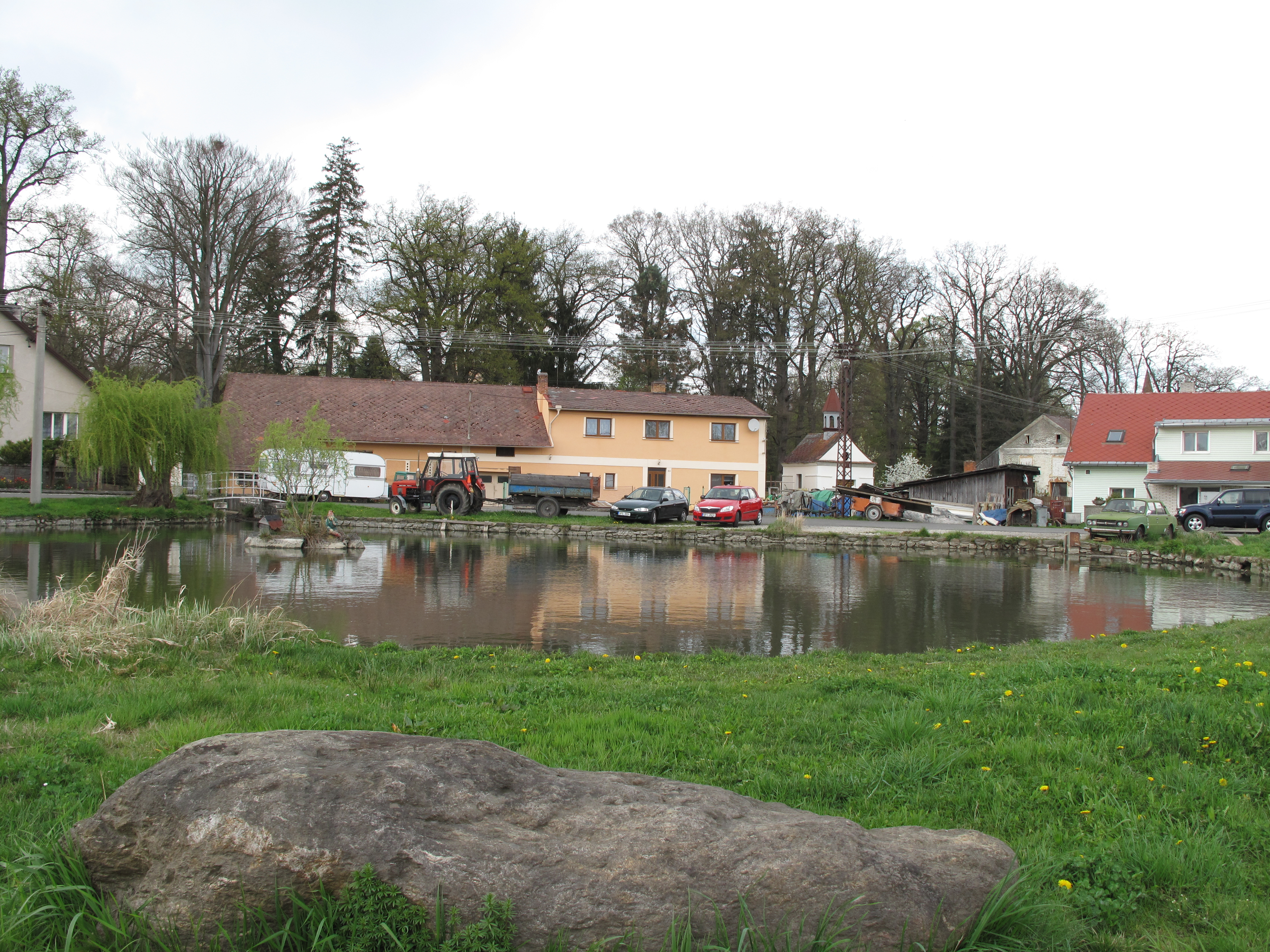
Pond

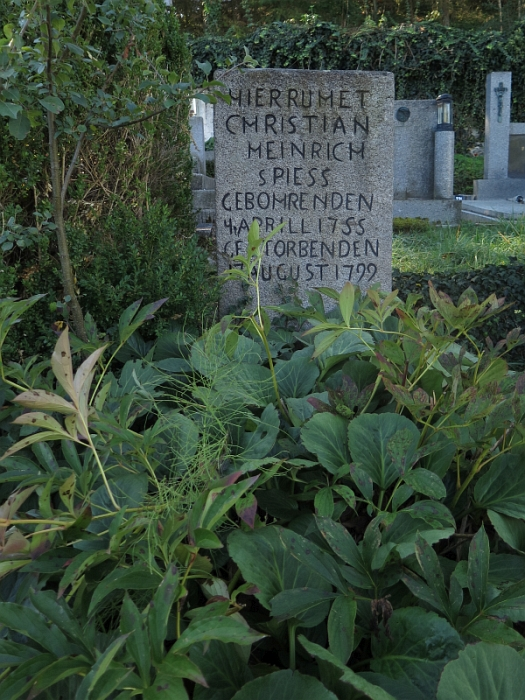
Grave of Christian Heinrich Spiess
