= Dewi Lestari =

Indonesian writer, singer, and songwriter

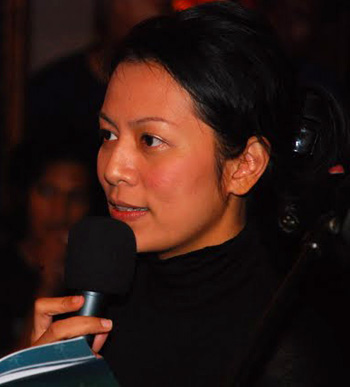
- Dee at the Ubud Writers and Readers Festival (2010)
- Born: Dewi Lestari Simangunsong; 20 January 1976 (age 50); Bandung, Indonesia
- Other name: Dee Lestari
- Education: international relations
- Alma mater: Parahyangan Catholic University
- Occupations: writer; singer; songwriter
- Musical career
- Genre: pop
- Instrument: vocal
- Label: Indo Semar Records
- Writing career
- Pen name: Dee
- Language: Indonesian
- Years active: 2001–present
- Period: Reform Era Generation
- Genres: novel, song
- Subjects: spirituality, shamanism and others
- Notable work: Supernova series
- Notable awards: Khatulistiwa Literary Award (2001), others
- Movement: Sastra wangi
- Website: deelestari.com/id/

Dewi "Dee" Lestari Simangunsong (born 20 January 1976, in Bandung, West Java) is an Indonesian writer, singer, and songwriter.

== Biography ==
Dee was born in Bandung, West Java on 20 January 1976; she was the fourth of five children born to a religious Christian family. Raised to be active in music, she took up singing, later providing backing vocals for singers such as Chrisye. After graduating high school, she attended Parahyangan Catholic University and graduated with a degree in international relations. In 1993, she formed the female vocal group Rida Sita Dewi (RSD) with her friends Rida Farida and Sita Nursanti; together they released three albums and a greatest hits album on Warna Musik and Sony Music.

In 2001, Dee released her first novel, Kesatria, Putri dan Bintang Jatuh (The Knight, The Princess, and the Falling Star). Part of the Supernova series, it was well received and spawned two sequels, Supernova: Akar (Supernova: Roots) and Petir (Thunder). Two of these were nominated for the Khatulistiwa Award, as was one of its sequels in 2003.

In March 2006, Dee released Filosofi Kopi: Kumpulan Cerita and Prosa Satu Dekade (Coffee Philosophy: A Decade's Worth of Stories and Prose). The collection of short stories and prose dealt with themes of love and spirituality and was described by literary critic and poet Goenawan Mohamad as being "Uncomplicated, in fact quite brilliant..." Mohamad went on to suggest that it would revive "wit" in Indonesian literature. At the same time, she released her first solo album, Out of Shell; the album had been in development since 1994.

Two years later, Dee released Rectoverso, a "hybrid" of an album and a short story collection. The project started in 2006 when she wrote the song "Hanya Isyarat" ("Only a Sign") and, unsatisfied, wrote a short story with the "same theme and inspiration"; from this seemingly different but "actually one and complementary" arrangement, she derived the title. One of the songs, "Malaikat Juga Tahu" ("Angels Also Know"), was released as a single to a warm reception. That year also saw her novel Perahu Kertas (Paper Boats) published.

In 2011, Dee released another collection, Madre (Mother), which was inspired by her hobby of cooking; madre is also a kind of yeast used in cooking. The following year she released the fourth installment in her Supernova series, Partikel. During the writing process, she researched various themes, including shamanism, ethnobotany, entheogen, crop circles, and extraterrestrials. In an interview with The Jakarta Post, she said that in writing the book she had voiced her "concerns about the environment, such as the destructive course we are taking and the future of humanity on this planet".

The first film adaptations of one of Dee's novels, Perahu Kertas 1 and Perahu Kertas 2 (both from her novel Perahu Kertas) were released in 2012. The romance films starred Maudy Ayunda and Adipati Dolken. Although originally envisioned as a single work (originally five hours long), director Hanung Bramantyo and the production crew split the two, hoping to keep the mystery of whether or not the protagonists would unite. Dee worked closely with Bramantyo and his wife Zaskia Adya Mecca during the filmmaking process, helping with the casting and writing the screenplay.

The second adaptation of her works, Madre, was released in 2013. As the source work was a short story collection, the film, directed by Benni Setiawan and starring Didi Petet, Vino G. Bastian, and Laura Basuki, was expanded to add more content. In an interview, Dee stated that, though the film worked as a romantic comedy, she found it had undergone "fairly crucial changes" ("perubahan cukup krusial") during the adaptation process, leading her to feel something was lacking. Film critic JB Kristanto was more vocal: he wrote that the melodramatic adaptation was "a soap opera brought to the big screen" ("sinetron versi layar lebar").

As of 2012 Plans are underway for the film adaptions of Rectoverso and Filosofi Kopi, as well as a fifth installment of Supernova.

== Themes and inspirations ==
Dee often touches on the themes of religion in her songs and writings. She notes that spirituality is her "driving force", but has said that she says "no" to religion. She has also touched on environmentalism. Poet Sitok Srengenge writes that Dee "offers unique and complex themes in each of her works, delivering her message with a smart and fresh narrative". Her works have been classified together with the sastra wangi (literally "fragrant literature") literary movement.

Dee has cited American author Ana Castillo as inspiring her to write short stories, as they are not always the same length. Dee enjoys the works of fellow Indonesian writers Sapardi Djoko Damono, Seno Gumira Ajidarma, and Ayu Utami. She has also read philosophical works by Ken Wilber, Friedrich Nietzsche, Immanuel Kant, and Martin Heidegger.

In a 2012 interview, Dee said that she works perhaps three months a year, using the time to do her research and write. Of the writing process, she stated, "it’s always the result of collaboration between seeds of ideas and my own willingness to work on it. So if one day I stop doing what I'm doing, perhaps that same dynamic won’t take place anymore".

== Personal life ==
Dee married Marcell Siahaan, a fellow singer; they have a son. They sometimes collaborated on writing songs. They divorced in 2008. Later that year, Dee married the holistic healer Reza Gunawan. In 2009, the couple announced the birth of their first child, who was born through an unassisted home birthing procedure.

Dee says that her "perception about religion is probably different from that of other people's". Although she was raised a Christian, she has also studied Buddhism and Kabbalah; she notes that she realized that God could be found outside of religious institutions when she followed a sunset from a church to a railroad yard. She is heavily against fundamentalism, stating that fundamentalists "are crazy".

Dee is a practitioner of yoga and meditation. She has been a vegetarian since 2006.
