= Jakarta Arts Council Novel Competition =

Jakarta Arts Council Novel Competition (in Indonesia: Sayembara Novel Dewan Kesenian Jakarta) is a biennial novel competition held by Jakarta Arts Council in Indonesia. It was first known as the 'Romance Writing Competition' and was discontinued in 1980 due to the decline in the quality of submissions according to the Abdul Hadi WM, the Chairman of the Jakarta Arts Council Literary Committee at the time. It was changed to a literary prize award in 1981–1984, but no literary or novel competitions were held between 1984 and 1996. The novel competition was held again in 1997-1998 and 2003 and 2006 before being regularly held every two years from 2016 on.

The competition is considered prestigious, with first prize of twenty million rupiah (approximately US$2,000).

Year	Title	Author	Prize
1974	Astiti Rahayu	Iskasiah Sumarto	First Prize
	Dari Hari ke Hari	H. Mahbub Djunaidi	First Prize
	Qisas	C. M. Nas	First Prize
	Sisa-Sisa Hari Kemarin	Suparta Brata	First Prize
1975	Mencoba Tidak Menyerah	Yudhistira Ardi Nugraha	First Prize
	Raumanen	Marianne Katoppo	First Prize
1976	Upacara	Korrie Layun Rampan	Second Prize
	Pembayaran	Kowil Daeng Nyonri	Third Prize
1977	Jembatan	Eyha	Second Prize
	Tiga Lagu Dolanan	Ismail Marhimin	Second Prize
	Aku Bukan Komunis	Yudhistira Ardi Nugraha	Runner-up
	Nakhoda	Ediruslan Amanriza	Runner-up
	Stasiun Bukit Gundul	Arswendo Atmowiloto	Runner-up
1978	Ke	Yudhistira Ardi Nugraha	Third Prize
1981	Bako	Darman Moenir	First Prize
	Harapan Hadiah Harapan	Nasjah Djamin	Second Prize
	Den Bagus	Suharmono	Runner-up
	Dicari Hari yang Cerah	E. Nohbi	Runner-up
	Ketika Lampu Berwarna Merah	Hamsad Rangkuti	Runner-up
	Merdeka	Putu Wijaya	Runner-up
	Panggil Aku Sakai	Ediruslan Amanriza	Runner-up
1998	Saman	Ayu Utami	First Prize
	Api Awan Asap	Korrie Layun Rampan	Second Prize
	Dikalahkan Sang Sapurba	Ediruslan Amanriza	Third Prize
2003	Dadaisme	Dewi Sartika	First Prize
	Geni Jora	Abidah El Khalieqy	Second Prize
	Tabula Rasa	Ratih Kumala	Third Prize
	Ular Keempat	Gus tf Sakai	Runner-up
	Tanah Biru	Pandu Abdurarahman	Runner-up
2006	Hubbu	Masuhri	First Prize
	Mutiara Karam	Tusiran Suseno	Second Prize
	Jukstaposisi	Calvin Michel Sidjaja	Third Prize
	Glonggong	Junaedi Setiyono	Runner-up
	Lanang	Yonathan Rahardjo	Runner-up
2008	Tanah Tabu	Anindita S. Thayf	First Prize
2010	Persiden	Wisran Hadi	Featured
	Lampuki	Arafat Nur	Featured
	Jatisaba	Ramayda Akmal	Featured
	Memoar Alang-alang	Hendri Teja	Featured
2012	Semusim	Andina Dian Dwi Fatma	Winner
	Dasamuka	Junaedi Setiyono	Featured
	Kei	Erni Aladjai	Featured
	Simpul Waktu	Sulfiza Ariska	Featured
	Surat Panjang tentang Jarak Kita yang Jutaan Tahun Cahaya	Dewi Kharisma Michellia	Featured
2016	Semua Ikan di Langit	Ziggy Zezsyazeoviennazabrizkie	First Prize
	Lengking Burung Kasuari	Nunuk Y. Kusmiana	Featured
	Tanah Surga Merah	Arafat Nur	Featured
	Curriculum Vitae	Benny Arnas	Featured
	24 Jam Bersama Gaspar: Sebuah Cerita Detektif	Sabda Armandio	Featured
2018	Orang-orang Oetimu	Felix K. Nesi	First Prize
	Anak Gembala yang Tertidur Panjang di Akhir Zaman	Ahmad Mustafa	Second Prize
	Balada Supri	Mochamad Nasrullah	Third Prize
2021	Kereta Semar Lembu	Zaky Yamani	First Prize
	Berat	Amalia Yunus	Second Prize
	Lantak La (Dramaturgi Anonim-Anonim)	Beri Hanna alias Syawal Pebrian	Third Prize
	Mustika Zakar Celeng	Adia Puja Pradana	Featured
	Lauk Daun	Hartari	Featured
	Gagarasuk dan Dunia Roh Seni	Bernardin Andara	Featured
	Nona Jepun	Sinta Yudisia	Featured
	Racun Pua	Ni Nyoman Ayu Suciartini	Featured
	apai dan Jazz	Mellyan	Featured
