= Saman (novel) =

Book by Ayu Utami

- Author: Ayu Utami
- Language: Indonesian
- Genre: Novel
- Publisher: Kepustakaan Populer Gramedia
- Publication date: 1998
- Publication place: Indonesia
- Media type: Print (hardback & paperback)
- Pages: 195 (19th printing)
- ISBN: 978-979-9023-17-9 (19th printing)
- OCLC: 67023545
- Followed by: Larung

Saman is an Indonesian novel by Ayu Utami published in 1998. It is Utami's first novel, and depicts the lives of four sexually liberated female friends, and a former Catholic priest, Saman, for whom the book is named. Written in seven to eight months while Utami was unemployed, Saman sold over 100,000 copies and ignited a new literary movement known as sastra wangi (originally used pejoratively) that opened the doors to an influx of sexually themed literary works by young Indonesian women.

Saman deals explicitly with themes of sexuality, taboo for women writers in Indonesia at that time. She also writes about the supernatural and mysticism. Utami has said the stories reflect some of her personal experiences, such as her loss of religion which mirrors that of the priest, Saman. Utami also includes passages reflecting the destructiveness of Suharto's political authoritarianism; in later interviews she said the political realities reflected in Saman are still applicable to post-Suharto Indonesia.

Saman won the 1997 Jakarta Arts Council Novel Competition, which led to its publication. Critical reception was mixed. Some critics praised the richness of its language, while others derided the novel for its sexual explicitness and questioned whether it was Utami's own work. The novel eventually was hailed for its groundbreaking portrayal of a woman's views of sexuality. As of 2008, it has been translated into six languages and won several awards, including the 2000 Prince Claus Award. A film adaptation is in the making.

== Plot ==
Saman follows four sexually liberated female friends: Yasmin, a married Catholic lawyer from Manado; Cok, a Balinese businesswoman with a high libido; Shakuntala, a bisexual Javanese dancer; and Laila, a Muslim Minangkabau-Sundanese journalist. The other protagonist is the titular Saman, a former Catholic priest turned human rights activist who becomes the target of sexual advances by Yasmin and Cok.

The first chapter, beginning in Central Park, New York, describes Laila waiting for the married Sihar and planning to lose her virginity to him. Eventually Laila realises that Sihar is with his wife, and feels depressed.

The second chapter covers Saman's childhood—including his relationship with his mother, a woman drawn to the spiritual world—his entry into priesthood, and his attempt to protect a rubber tapping community from the attempt by a local plantation to acquire their land. After the attempt fails and the plantation's hired thugs raze the community to the ground and kills those who resist, Saman is captured and tortured. He eventually is broken out of his confinement by the surviving resistance members, becoming a fugitive and relinquishing his duty as a priest. He becomes a human rights advocate, assisted by Yasmin.

The third chapter, written from the point of view of Shakuntala, tells how Yasmin, Cok, Shakuntala, and Laila met at high school and their escapades there, both sexual and academic. Shakuntala recounts a fantasy she had as a teenager about meeting a "foreign demon", embracing him and then having a debate on the different cultural aspects of sexuality. Towards the end of the chapter, Shakuntala notes that she is attracted to Laila and dislikes Sihar, but supports her friend's efforts as she cares for her.

During the fourth chapter, Saman is spirited away to New York by Yasmin and Cok. Although both Cok and the married Yasmin make advances toward him, he initially declines. However, during the middle of the night he and Yasmin have sex, but Saman is distressed because he ejaculated quickly. The entirety of the last chapter consists of emails sent between Saman and Yasmin, discussing their insecurities, that become increasingly sexualised.

== Writer ==
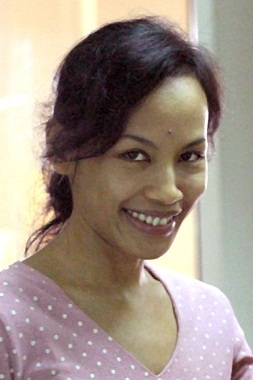
Ayu Utami wrote Saman in seven to eight months while unemployed.

When written, Saman was intended to be included in a work in progress entitled Laila Tak Mampir di New York (Laila Does Not Stop Over in New York). However, after the character Larung became too developed Utami split the storylines. Saman was published first, with Larung following in 2001. Saman was written during a period of seven to eight months while Utami was unemployed.

A. Junaidi of The Jakarta Post suggests that the political insights in Saman are partially inspired by Utami's earlier career as a journalist, both with Forum Keadilan and as a founding member of the Alliance of Independent Journalists.

== Themes ==
Junaidi notes that although Saman is about a female's perspective of sexuality, it also deals with the authoritarianism of Suharto's regime of the New Order, including the repression of human rights activists. In a 2005 interview with The Jakarta Post, Utami said that her critique of the New Order is still relevant; at the time of the interview, she saw the Suharto government as having left Indonesia with a legacy of what she calls "nuclear waste", including a loss of Indonesia's agricultural ability. In the interview, Utami also noted that Indonesians had become corrupt and lazy, increasingly bureaucratic, and without a feeling of sportsmanship.

Utami has also noted that the novel is a reflection of her own restlessness and anxiety. Although little of it directly reflects events in her life, she notes that Saman's loss of religion reflects her own, and the book reflects her belief that a double standard exists regarding virginity in Indonesian culture. Although the novel touches on racial harmony, Utami said that she considers the theme to be undeveloped.

Barbara Hatley notes that Saman contrasts the perceived differences between Eastern and Western cultures. She cites the scene where Shakuntala fantasizes encountering a "foreign demon" (European explorer) while bathing, later "embracing" him and discussing the "bizarre" requirement that Asian men are required to wear penis decorations and the "crassness" of Europeans who do not care about virginity, wear bikinis in public, and show sex on television. According to Hatley, this is rendered more ironic by both characters being naked during the discussion. She also notes that Saman touches on the traditional archetype of feminine power drawn from nature and the supernatural, and it reinterprets the hero archetype through Saman, who is small, thin, and inexperienced with women but able to withstand torture and defend a community of rubber tappers.

Junaidi writes that Saman also includes bits of the supernatural, including ghosts and mysticism. In her master's thesis, Micaela Campbell writes that Saman's mother, known only as "Ibu" (Indonesian for 'Mother'), was "highly susceptible to supernatural forces that seem to govern over her". Through Ibu, Javanese mysticism and other supernatural content is introduced that contrasts Saman's father, a realist; this leads to Ibu "failing" in her role as a mother, and, according to Campbell, may be a factor driving Saman to priesthood. Campbell notes that Shakuntala also lives in a world of jinns and peri; however, unlike Ibu, Shakuntala draws further strength from this spiritual world.

== Release and reception ==
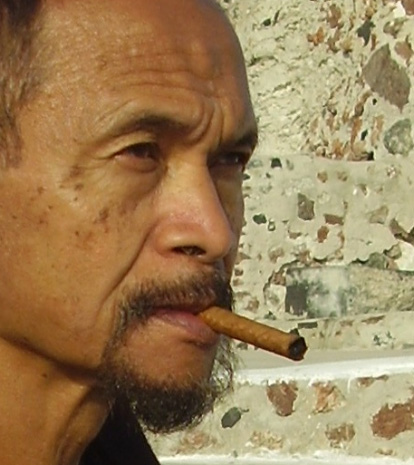
Goenawan Muhammad was among those suggested as the true author of Saman.

Saman was released in 1998 after winning the 1997 Jakarta Art Institute novel writing contest. In 1998, Saman won the Jakarta Arts Council Novel Competition. In 2000, it received the Prince Claus Award. By 2005, it had been translated into Dutch and English; the English translation took a long time to write because Utami was concerned that an overexplanation of the novel caused it to lose all of its sensuality. It has also been translated into French, Czech, and Japanese (by two separate translators). As of 2008, a translation into Korean is underway. By 2004, the book had sold 100,000 copies, a large figure for an Indonesian novel.

Critical reception was mixed. Some critics praised the "rich language" used in the novel. However, others disapproved of the open sexuality of the novel, and its explicit use of the words "penis", "vagina", "orgasm" and "condoms" was considered "too much"; other controversial terms include "rape me", "I am still a virgin", and "masturbation". Utami's own mother refused to read the novel aloud to her nearly blind husband, stating that it is "not meant for those of their generation". Campbell notes that the use of language in Saman reflects the positioning of the female characters as self-empowered and independent, capable of making their own decisions.

In Saman Utami became one of the first female Indonesian authors to explicitly discuss sexuality, generally a taboo subject for women, in her work. However, when it was first released Utami faced charges that she was not the actual writer; among those suggested as the author was poet Goenawan Mohamad, known as Utami's mentor. Mohamad denied the rumours and said that he wished he "could write the kind of prose which Ayu uses". Utami suggests that the rumours were based on a belief that only men could write good novels; the literature scene before Saman had indeed been dominated by male writers.

The novel started a new era of literature after the downfall of President Suharto and ignited the sastra wangi (literally 'fragrant literature') literary movement as well as an influx of sexually themed literary works by women. Utami disagrees with the label sastra wangi, stating that it reflects the obsession of the press with the women writers and not their work.

As of 2011 a film adaptation is in the works, with Dutch screenwriter Orlow Seunke expressing interest to be involved with the project. However, Seunke and Utami have had creative differences regarding which characters should be kept.
