= Christian Heinrich Spiess =

German writer

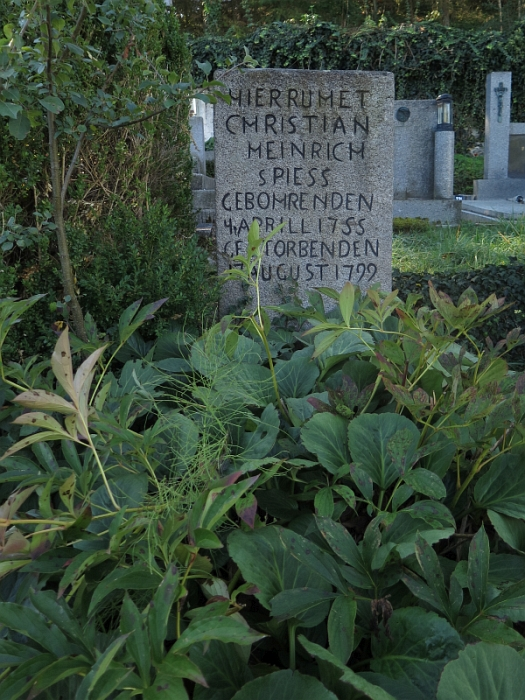
Grave of Christian Heinrich Spiess in Bezděkov

Christian Heinrich Spiess (4 April 1755 – 17 August 1799) was a German writer of romances and later popular sensational horror stories.

== Life ==
He was born in Freiberg in Saxony. For a time an actor, he was appointed in 1788 controller on the estate of Count Caspar Hermann von Künigl at Besdiekau in Bohemia, where he died, almost insane, the result of his weird fancies, on 17 August 1799.

Spiess, in his Ritter-, Räuber- and Geister-Romane, as they are called—stories of knights, robbers and ghosts of the "dark" ages—the idea of which he borrowed from Goethe's Götz von Berlichingen and Schiller's Die Räuber and Der Geisterseher, was the founder of the German Schauerroman (shocker), a style of writing continued, though in a finer vein, by Carl Gottlob Cramer (1758–1817) and by Goethe's brother-in-law, Christian August Vulpius.

These stories, appealing largely to the vulgar taste, made Spiess one of the most widely read authors of his day. The most popular was a ghost story of the 13th century, Das Petermännchen (1793); this was an influence on the work of Ann Radcliffe and the novel The Monk by Matthew Gregory Lewis. The novel involves a knight who is encouraged by an evil ghost (in the form of a dwarf) to commit rape, incest and murder, before being torn to pieces by the Devil.

Among his other Schauerroman stories were Der alte Überall and Nirgends (1792); Die Löwenritter (1794), and Hans Heiling, vierter und letzter Regent der Erd- Luft- Feuer- und Wasser-Geister (1798).

Beside numerous comedies, Spiess wrote, anticipating Schiller, a tragedy Maria Stuart (1784), which was in the same year performed at the court theatre in Vienna.

== Bibliography ==
- Karl Goedeke, Grundrisz zur Geschichte der deutschen Dichtung, v. 506 sqq.
- Müller-Fraureuth, Die Ritter- and Räuberromane (Halle, 1894).
