= Brendan Connell =

American author and translator (born 1970)

Brendan Connell (born 1970) is an American author, translator and editor. Though his work often falls into the horror and fantasy genres, it has also often been called unclassifiable and avant-garde. His style has been compared to that of J.K. Huysmans and Angela Carter. Some of his shorter fiction, such as that contained in his collection Metrophilias, has been referred to as prose poetry.

Influences he has cited include Balzac and Ponson du Terrail. He has also written many lyrics for the Serbian band Kodagain.

Connell has also been associated with the contemporary Neo-Decadent movement. The term “Neo-Decadence,” in its modern literary sense, first appeared in the cover copy of The Translation of Father Torturo, where its protagonist was described as a “neo-decadent anti-hero.” In 2010 Connell published the Manifesto of Neo-Decadence, articulating a contemporary literary approach influenced by Decadence and other avant-garde traditions. His Metrophilias has subsequently been identified as a Neo-Decadent work, as has his later novel Heqet.

Connell also developed the literary concept called “The Pleasant” in his collection Pleasant Tales, a follow-up to his decadent horror collection Unpleasant Tales. The idea was subsequently taken up by Justin Isis in Pleasant Tales II (published by Snuggly Books) and in the anthology The Man From Düsseldorf: A Tribute to Claus Laufenburg, edited by Connell, which described its contributors as part of the “New Pleasant Movement”.

Occultism has been a recurring subject in Connell’s fiction and editorial work. His novel The Translation of Father Torturo (2005) is a modern Gothic tale involving black magic and the Catholic Church, while his later collection Spells (2023) explores themes including magic, poisons, strange births and lost theologies. As an editor, Connell compiled three volumes in the Books of Occult Fiction of Many Colours series and contributed an afterword to a modern edition of Paschal Beverly Randolph’s Dhoula Bel.

== Bibliography ==
=== Novels ===
- The Translation of Father Torturo, Prime Books, 2005
- The Architect, PS Publishing, 2012
- Miss Homicide Plays the Flute, Eibonvale Press, 2013
- The Cutest Girl in Class, Snuggly Books, 2013
- The Galaxy Club, Chomu Press, 2014
- Cannibals of West Papua, Zagava, 2015
- Clark, Snuggly Books, 2016
- The Heel, Snuggly Books, 2017
- Unofficial History of Pi Wei, Snuggly Books, 2018
- The Metapheromenoi, Snuggly Books, 2020
- Against the Grain Again: The Further Adventures of Des Esseintes, Tartarus Press, 2021
- Heqet, Egaeus Press, 2022
- Upuaut, Occult Press, 2024

=== Collections ===
- Metrophilias, Better Non Sequitur, 2010
- Unpleasant Tales, Eibonvale Press, 2010
- The Life of Polycrates and Other Stories for Antiquated Children, Chomu Press, 2011
- Lives of Notorious Cooks, Chomu Press, 2012
- The Metanatural Adventures of Dr. Black, PS Publishing, 2014
- Jottings from a Far Away Place, Snuggly Books, 2015
- Pleasant Tales, Eibonvale Press, 2017
- Spells, Snuggly Books, 2023

=== Translations ===
- Requiems and Nightmares, by Guido Gozzano, Hieroglyphic Press, 2012 (translated together with Anna Fonti Connell)
- Raun, by Ruggero Vasari, Snuggly Books, 2023 (translated together with Anna Fonti Connell)
- Narcisa and Other Stories, by Luigi Gualdo, Snuggly Books, 2024 (translated together with Anna Fonti Connell)
- The Violin with Human Strings and Other Tales of Musical Madness, by Antonio Ghislanzoni, Snuggly Books, 2024 (translated together with Anna Fonti Connell)

=== Anthologies edited ===
- The Man From Düsseldorf: A Tribute to Claus Laufenburg, Snuggly Books, 2019
- The Neo-Decadent Cookbook, Eibonvale Press, 2020 (edited together with Justin Isis)
- The World in Violet: An Anthology of English Decadent Poetry, Snuggly Books, 2022
- The Zinzolin Book of Occult Fiction, Snuggly Books, 2022
- The Zaffre Book of Occult Fiction, Snuggly Books, 2023
- The Viridian Book of Occult Fiction, Snuggly Books, 2024

=== Interviews ===
- Brendan Connell Interview (Weird Fiction Review, September 2012)
- Brendan Connell Interview (Rising Shadow, March 2014)
- Brendan Connell Interview (Porta VIII, January 2015)
- Brendan Connell Interview (Cultured Vultures, February 2016)
