= Djenar Maesa Ayu =

Indonesian novelist, short story writer, actress, screenwriter, and filmmaker

- Born: 14 January 1973 (age 53); Jakarta, Indonesia
- Spouse: Edhie Wijaya (div. 2005)
- Children: 2
- Writing career
- Language: Indonesian
- Period: Reform Era Generation
- Genre: Fiction
- Literary movement: Sastra wangi

Djenar Maesa Ayu (born 14 January 1973), also known as Nay, is an Indonesian novelist, short story writer, actress, screenwriter, and filmmaker. Her work has variously been described as "provocative and lurid", and unique and brave. Because of the boldness of the topics she writes about, Ayu is considered to a member of the informal movement labeled sastra wangi.

== Life and work ==
Ayu was born on 14 January 1973 in Jakarta, Indonesia.The daughter of film director Sjumandjaja and actress Tuti Kirana, she began writing while studying at elementary school. After graduation, Ayu worked as a television presenter for a short time before beginning to write professionally.

Ayu's first book was a compilation of eleven short stories under the title Mereka Bilang, Saya Monyet! (They say I'm a Monkey), written in 2001 and published the following year. In 2003, one year after it was published, Mereka Bilang, Saya Monyet was one of ten books nominated for the Khatulisitwa Literary Award. The book has since been translated into English by Michael N. Garcia of Cornell University, with the English translation being launched, along with Nayla, her first novel, during the 2005 Ubud Writers & Readers Festival. Her second book, Jangan Main-Main (dengan Kelaminmu) (Don't Play (with Your Genitals)), also a compilation of eleven short stories, was nominated for the Khatulistiwa Literary Award in 2004.Nayla, was published in 2005, followed by Cerita Pendek Tentang Cerita Cinta Pendek (Short Stories about Short Stories), published in 2006.

Several of Ayu's short stories have been published in Indonesian newspapers, including Kompas and Republika, as well as in magazines such as Cosmopolitan Indonesia and Djakarta! Best Short Story awards have been awarded to two of her short stories, namely Menyusu Ayah (Breastfeeding Father) in 2002 and Waktu Nayla (Nayla's Time) in 2003. The latter work was compiled, together with Asmoro, in an anthology of Kompas selected short stories.

Ayu's short story collection 1 Perempuan, 14 Laki-laki (1 Woman, 14 Men), so called because it consists of 14 stories co-written with 14 men, was launched on her 38th birthday on 14 January 2011. The work was inspired by a successful collaboration Ayu had previously had with the author Agus Noor, which had resulted in the short story Kunang-kunang Dalam Bir (Fireflies in a Glass of Beer), which was published in Kompas. She is currently working on a new novel, Ranjang (Bed), the plot of which was inspired by stories from the Petualangan Celana Dalam (The Undergarment Adventures), a short story collection by another of her collaborators, Nugroho Suksmanto. Ayu's fifth short story compilation, T(w)itit!, was released on her 39th birthday. The inspiration for the new anthology came from Ayu's own Twitter posts, crafted into 11 short stories woven around a central figure called Nayla.

In 2008 Ayu debuted as film director with the release of the film version of Mereka Bilang, Saya Monyet!. This film is based on two short stories from the collection: Lintah (Leech) and Melukis Jendela (Painting the Window). Ayu also acts, and has appeared in a number of Indonesian films.

== Family ==
Ayu is a mother and grandmother. She was once married to Edhie Wijaya for 14 years until their divorce on 26 June 2005. They had two daughters, Banyu Bening (born 1992) and Btari Maharani.

== Style ==
For her frankness in dealing with sexuality, Ayu has been grouped with the informal sastra wangi movement. However, she disagrees with the label, saying that it is "a kind of sexual harassment of her work".

== Selected works ==
=== Short story collections ===
- Mereka Bilang, Saya Monyet (They Say I'm a Monkey), 2001
- Jangan Main-Main (dengan Kelaminmu) (Don't play (with your sex)), 2003
- Cerita Pendek Tentang Cerita Cinta Pendek (A Short story about a Story of Short Love), 2006
- 1 Perempuan, 14 Laki-laki (1 Woman, 14 Men), 2011

=== Novels ===
- Nayla, 2005

== Filmography ==
=== Cast ===
- Boneka dari Indiana (Doll from Indiana)1990
- Koper (The Lost Suitcase) 2006
- Anak-Anak Borobudur (Children of Borobudur; 2007)
- Cinta Setaman (Love in a Garden; 2008)
- Ai Lop Yu Pul (2009)
- Dikejar Setan (Overtaken by Satan) 2009
- Melodi (Melody) 2010
- Purple Love (2011)
- Kartini (2017)
- Bidadari Mencari Sayap (2020)
- Mendua (2022) as Dr. Alya Darmawan
- Siksa Kubur (Grave Torture; 2024)
- Gowok: Javanese Kamasutra (2025)
- Sammi, Who Can Detach His Body Parts (2025) (short film)

=== Crew ===
- Mereka Bilang, Saya Monyet! (They Say I'm a Monkey!; 2009)
