= Nova Riyanti Yusuf =

Indonesian writer

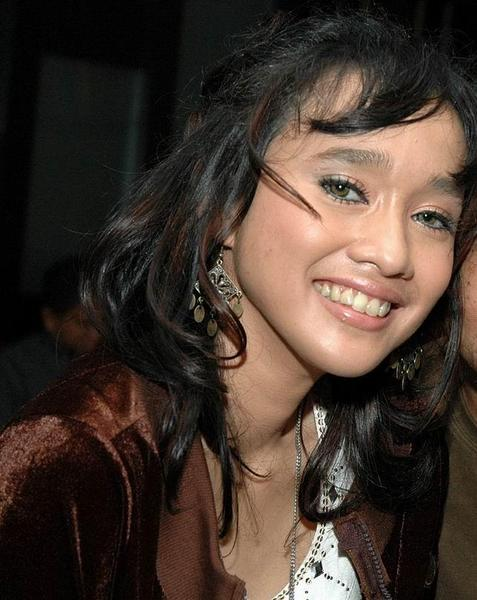

Member of the People's Representative Council
- In office 2014–2019
- President: Joko Widodo

Personal details
- Born: November 27, 1977 (age 48) Palu, Central Sulawesi, Indonesia
- Party: Democratic
- Education: Trisakti University; University of Indonesia
- Occupation: Politician; Psychiatrist; Writer
- Writing career
- Language: Indonesian, English
- Years active: 2003–present
- Period: Reform Era Generation
- Genres: Novel; scenario; essay; oration; non-fiction
- Notable work: Mahadewa Mahadewi
- Movement: Sastra wangi

Dr. Nova Riyanti Yusuf, SpKJ (psychiatrist), is an Indonesian politician, psychiatrist, and writer. She often calls herself NoRiYu. Yusuf was a member of the House of Representatives as a representative of the Democratic Party for the 2009–2014 and 2014–2019 periods. During her term as a representative, she initiated and supported the Mental Health Law (Undang-Undang Kesehatan Jiwa). The bill was passed into law in 2014 (Law Number 18 Year 2014).

== Education ==
- TK Ora et Labora
- SD Ora et Labora
- SMP Al Azhar Pejaten
- SMA Tarakanita I
- The Writing School, Singapore
- Faculty of General Medicine, Trisakti University
- Psychiatry Residency Program, Faculty of Medicine, University of Indonesia
- Research Fellow on Mental Health Implementation Research, Harvard Medical School, Department of Global Health & Social Medicine (2015)
- PhD from Public Health Faculty, University of Indonesia (2019)

== Career ==
In July 2019, Yusuf got a Doctorate in Public Health from the Faculty of Public Health of the University of Indonesia with a thesis entitled "Early Detection of Risk Factors for Adolescent Suicide Ideas in High School / Equivalent in DKI Jakarta".

=== Occupations and positions ===
- President Director, National Center for Mental Health - Marzoeki Mahdi Hospital, Ministry of Health of the Republic of Indonesia (2023–present)
- Member of Parliament, the House of Representatives of the Republic of Indonesia (2009–2014, 2018–2019)
- Deputy Chairperson of Commission IX (Ministry of Health, Ministry of Manpower & Transmigration, National Agency of Drug and Food Control, National Family Planning Coordinating Agency, The Indonesian Migrant Workers Protection Board) (2012–2014)
- Psychiatrist & Clinical Educator at Dr Soeharto Heerdjan Mental Hospital Jakarta (2016–2018)
- Consultant for WHO Indonesia on Suicide Prevention Strategy according to the WHO Framework on Suicide Prevention (2018)
- Author of 13 published books & screenplays
- Speaker on mental health issues
- Lecturer at Binus International, Trisakti Medical School, UPN Veteran Medical School, Paramadina University

=== Organizations ===
- Secretary General of Asian Federation of Psychiatric Associations (2019–present)
- Head of Jakarta Psychiatric Association (2016–2022)
- Chairwoman of the Alumni Association for the Medical Faculty of University of Trisakti (2021–2025)

=== Bibliography ===
- Novel [Mahadewa Mahadewi] (Gramedia Pustaka Utama, 2003)
- Novel [Imipramine] (Gramedia Pustaka Utama, 2004)
- Novel adaptation from [30 Hari Mencari Cinta] movie (Gagas Media, 2004)
- Novel [3some] (Gagas Media, 2005)
- Collection of essays [Libido Junkie: A Memoir for the Radicals] (Gagas Media, 2005)
- Novel adaptation from [Betina] movie (Gagas Media, 2006)
- Novel adaptation from [Garasi] movie (Gagas Media, 2006)
- Collection of essays [Stranger than Fiction: Cerita dari Kamar Jaga Malam] (Gramedia Pustaka Utama, 2008).
- Screenplay [Merah Itu Cinta] (Rapi Films, 2007)
- Collection of essays [Atas Nama Jiwa (1 & 2)] (www.jakartabeat.net)
- Memoir [A Rookie & the Passage of the Mental Health Law: the Indonesian Story] (Gramediana, 2014)
- Memoir [Interupsi! The Other Side of the Story] (Gramedia Pustaka Utama, 2015)
- Nonfiction book [Jelajah Jiwa Hapus Stigma: Autopsi Psikologis Bunuh Diri Dua Pelukis] (Penerbit Buku Kompas, 2020); in the process of movie adaptation with Falcon Pictures
- Nonfiction book [Bunuh Diri Remaja: Yuk Deteksi!] (Penerbit Buku Kompas, coming in 2022)

=== Achievements ===
- 2020 MURI (National Record Museum) Record for the most frequent virtual speaker on mental health issues during 3-month of pandemic lockdown
- 2020 National Finalist The ASEAN - US Science Prize for Women
- 2016 Featured in The Saturday Profile “Freeing Mentally Ill of Stigma & Chains”, The New York Times
- 2016 Indonesian Caring Physician by Indonesian Doctors Association
- 2015 Mental Health Implementation Research, Harvard Medical School
- 2014 Community Mental Health Leader awarded by the Minister of Health Nafsiah Mboi
- 2014 Most Powerful Woman by Her World Indonesia magazine
- 2013 Champion Parliamentarian by Asian Forum of Parliamentarians on Population and Development (AFPPD)
- 2009 one of 10 Most Influential Female Legislators in Indonesia by Globe Asia magazine
- 2004 Winner of Fun Fearless Female by Cosmopolitan Indonesia magazine
