= Taalam Acey =

American spoken-word artist (born 1970), slam poetry specialist

- Born: September 16, 1970 (age 55); Newark, New Jersey, U.S.
- Occupations: Spoken-word artist, author
- Website: www.taalamacey.com

Taalam Acey (born September 16, 1970) is an American spoken-word artist. In 1999, he left his position lecturing senior-level accounting at Rutgers University to become a full-time performance poet.

== Early years ==
Acey was born in Newark, New Jersey.

== Career ==
Acey was a member of the 1999 New York City slam team representing the Nuyorican Cafe. He was the 2000 Grand Slam Champion of London's Paddington International Poetry Festival. He was also the 2000–2001 "New Jersey Slam Master" and the District of Columbia's Black Words Grand Slam Champion.

Acey was one of four poets selected by Essence magazine to perform at the 2001 Essence Music Festival in New Orleans. He was also one of five poets featured in the New Jersey Performing Arts Center's 'Theater of the Spoken Word.' Acey has lectured on performance poetry at the University of California, Berkeley's Center for Urban Education.

His first spoken-word video "When the Smoke Clearz" was shown in film festivals in Los Angeles, New York, Amsterdam, and Rotterdam. The video was nominated for a 2002 Sundance Film Festival Online Award.

His work has been featured in New Jersey Star-Ledger (July 2001) and Essence, Philadelphia Weekly (December 2005). Marc Smith, the founder of slam poetry, used examples of Acey's poetry in his book: The Complete Idiot's Guide to Slam Poetry..

== Published works ==
=== Literary ===
- Eyes Free: The Memoir, Word Supremacy Press, 2003
- What You Deserve, a novel, Word Supremacy Press, 2006
- Troubled Soul Refinery, poetry compilation, Word Supremacy Press, 2007
- Excellent Exposure, essays and poems, Word Supremacy Press, 2009

=== Recorded performances/CD ===
- Morally Bankrupt One: The Wickedest Man in Babylon (1999)
- Morally Bankrupt Two: Pain Remover (2000)
- Morally Bankrupt Final: Mood Demystify (2000)
- Code Blues (2001)
- Blues Resurgence (2002)
- Belief System (2003)
- Pieces of Change Disc 1 (2005)
- Pieces of Change Disc 2 (2005)
- Underground Heavy (2006)
- The Market 4 Change (2007)
- Self Construct (2007)
- California Suite (2008)
- The Market 4 Change, Volume 2 (2009)
