= 21st century in literature =

Literature of the 21st century refers to world literature produced during the 21st century. The measure of years is, for the purpose of this article, literature written from (roughly) the year 2001 to the present.

== 2000s ==
- 2001 – The Corrections by Jonathan Franzen; Seabiscuit: An American Legend by Laura Hillenbrand; Life of Pi by Yann Martel;
  Nobel Prize: V. S. Naipaul
- 2002 – Atonement by Ian McEwan; Middlesex by Jeffrey Eugenides; Everything is Illuminated by Jonathan Safran Foer;
  Nobel Prize: Imre Kertész
- 2003 – The Da Vinci Code by Dan Brown; Roman Triptych (Meditation);
  Nobel Prize: J. M. Coetzee
- 2004 –
  Nobel Prize: Elfriede Jelinek
- 2005 –
  Nobel Prize: Harold Pinter
- 2006 – The Road by Cormac McCarthy; Les Bienveillantes by Jonathan Littell; Against the Day by Thomas Pynchon;
  Nobel Prize: Orhan Pamuk
- 2007 – The Brief Wondrous Life of Oscar Wao by Junot Díaz; A Thousand Splendid Suns by Khaled Hosseini; On Chesil Beach by Ian McEwan;
  Nobel Prize: Doris Lessing
- 2008 –
  Nobel Prize: J. M. G. Le Clézio
- 2009 – The Humbling by Philip Roth; Wolf Hall by Hilary Mantel;
  Nobel Prize: Herta Müller

== 2010s ==
- 2010 | 2011 | 2012 | 2013 | 2014 | 2015 | 2016 | 2017 | 2018 | 2019

Nobel laureates: List of Nobel laureates in Literature

== See also ==
- Electronic literature
