= Fira Basuki =

Indonesian writer

- Born: 7 June 1972 (age 54); Jakarta, Indonesia
- Spouse: Edi Widjaya (divorced)
- Writing career
- Language: Indonesian
- Period: Reform Era Generation
- Genre: Novel
- Literary movement: Sastra wangi

Fira Basuki (born June 7, 1972) is an Indonesian novelist. Arguably her most famous work is her trilogy debut consisting of Jendela-Jendela (The Windows), Pintu (The Door) and Atap (The Roof). The trilogy concerning the journeys of Javanese brother and sister Bowo and June; from graduating high school, studying abroad in the US, their meta-physical experiences (especially Bowo's "second sight" and aura-reading capabilities), relationships with people of different nationalities (especially June's Tibetan husband), and their return home to Indonesia.

Her novel, Brownies, was adapted to a movie which was nominated for Best Picture at the 2005 Indonesian Film Festival, eventually losing out to Gie (though Brownies did earn a Best Director Citra award for Hanung Bramantyo). She recently launched to widespread media acclaim a popular biography on media person Wimar Witoelar, her first work in non-fiction.

Her novel, Astral Astria was published in 2007. At that time, she was working as Chief Editor at the Indonesian edition of Cosmopolitan Magazine.

Because of the boldness of the topics she writes about, Basuki is considered to a member of the informal movement labeled sastra wangi.
