= Neo-Decadence =

Artistic movement

Neo-Decadence is a contemporary artistic movement, primarily focused on literature, but which embraces other modes of creative activity. Though influenced by the aesthetic ideology of the Decadent movement, it might be seen as much as a reaction against other trends in contemporary literature as a resurrection of the original movement. In general, Neo-Decadence has more in common with avant-garde literary movements (Symbolism, Decadence and Futurism) than with genre fiction categories such as speculative fiction or horror, with which it is often compared.

== Origins ==
The term “Neo-Decadence” as it is related to the Neo-Decadent movement was first used in the cover copy of Brendan Connell’s 2005 novel The Translation of Father Torturo, in which the principal character is referred to as a “neo-decadent anti-hero.” In 2010, Connell published the "Manifesto of Neo-Decadence" at a website called gestaltmash.com. In 2018, Drowning in Beauty: The Neo-Decadent Anthology, was published, which included both the first manifesto, and a Second Manifesto of Neo-Decadence, written by Justin Isis.

== Characteristics ==
Neo-Decadence, which has also been called “Post-Naturalism,” according to Daniel Corrick, in his introduction to Drowning in Beauty: The Neo-Decadent Anthology, “involves a shift in aesthetic consciousness, an altered mental state which temporarily negates our awareness of whatever utilitarian social purposes an object or person might serve. Exploration of beauty and its meaning becomes the aim of consciousness.” In the collaborative essay “Against Neo-Passéism,” Neo-Decadence is defined in contrast to Neo-Passéism, which is described as “the unexamined artistic logic of capitalist realism,” a blanket term denoting various trends in contemporary art and writing, particularly those with a nostalgic nature or overreliance on popular culture tropes.

Some Neo-Decadent authors, such as Damian Murphy, are practicing occultists and consider their work to be written in metaphysical opposition to what they perceive as the prevailing materialist assumptions of mainstream fiction.

Other preoccupations include fashion, self-absorption, obsession, drugs, cuisine, and excessive retro-gaming.

== Notable works ==
=== Single author ===
- 2005: The Translation of Father Torturo by Brendan Connell
- 2010: Metrophilias by Brendan Connell
- 2011: I Wonder What Human Flesh Tastes Like by Justin Isis
- 2016: Rule Dementia by Quentin S. Crisp
- 2017: Daughters of Apostasy by Damian Murphy
- 2018: The Age of Blight by Kristine Ong Muslim
- 2019: Harlem Smoke by James Champagne
- 2020: Invisibility: A Manifesto by Audrey Szasz
- 2020: The Ministry of Guidance and Other Stories by Golnoosh Nour
- 2022: Heqet by Brendan Connell
- 2023: Surrender to a Stranger by Jeremy Reed
- 2024: Fall Garment by Paul Cunningham
- 2024: Peppermint Werewolf by Aaron Lange
- 2024: The Universe as Performance Art by Colby Smith
- 2024: Impure Thoughts by Golnoosh Nour
- 2025: No Moon by Colby Smith
- 2025: Consciousness: A Neo-Decadent Manifesto by Siobhán M. La Grippe
- 2026: The Electro-Etheric Minotaur by Damian Murphy

=== Anthologies ===
- 2018 Drowning in Beauty: The Neo-Decadent Anthology edited by Justin Isis and Daniel Corrick
- 2020: The Neo-Decadent Cookbook edited by Brendan Connell and Justin Isis
- 2021: Neo-Decadence: 12 Manifestos edited by Justin Isis
- 2023: Neo-Decadence Evangelion edited by Justin Isis
