= Ayu Utami =

Indonesian writer

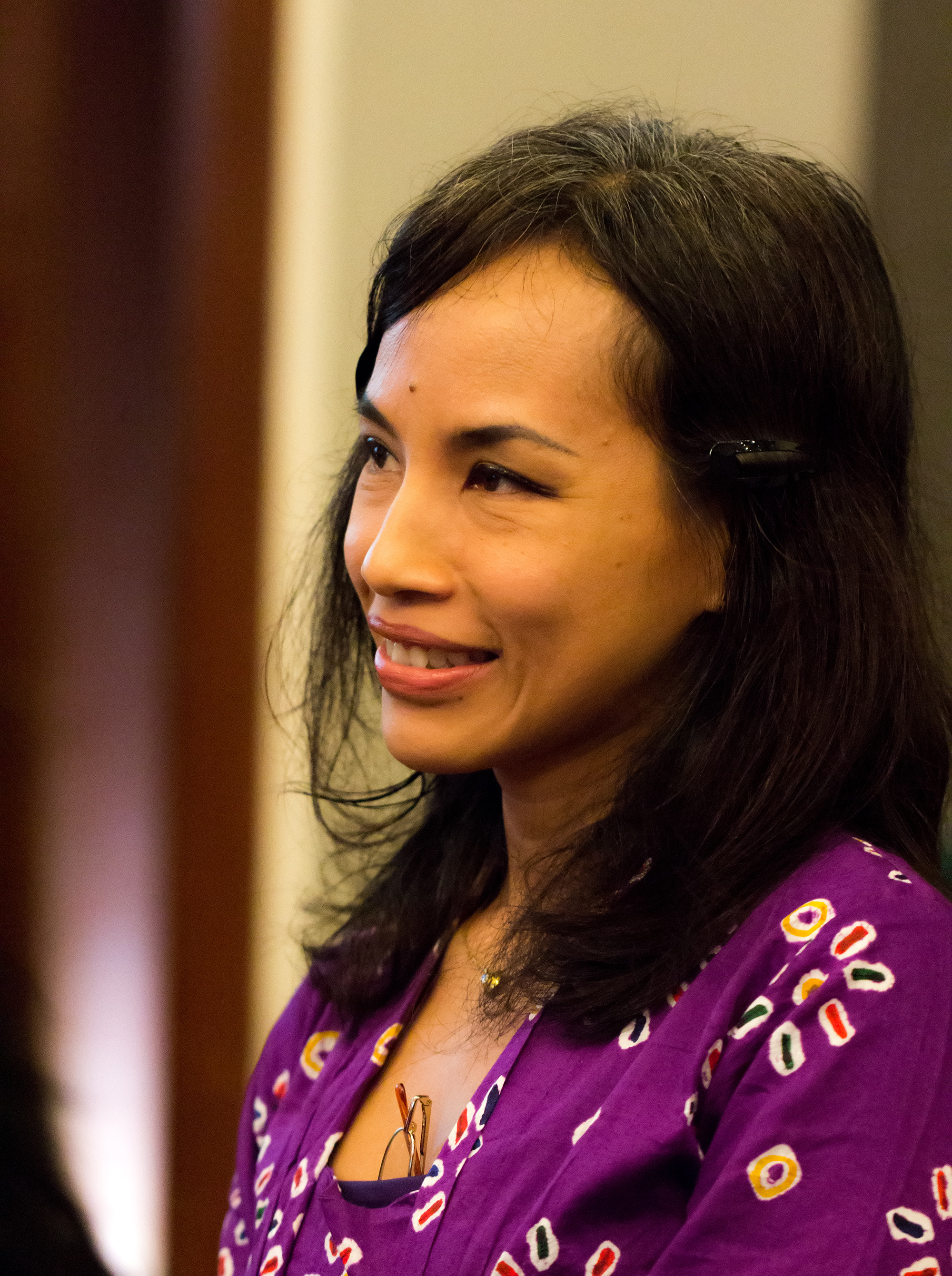
- Utami at the International Conference on Feminism, 2016
- Born: Bogor, Indonesia
- Education: Russian language
- Alma mater: University of Indonesia
- Occupations: Writer, journalist
- Writing career
- Language: Indonesian
- Years active: 1990s–present
- Period: Reform Era Generation
- Genres: Novel, essay
- Subjects: Authoritarianism, women's liberation, sexuality
- Notable work: Saman
- Notable awards: Sayembara (novel) Dewan Kesenian Jakarta; Kusala Sastra Khatulistiwa; Prince Claus Award
- Movement: Sastra wangi

Ayu Utami is an Indonesian writer who has written novels, short-stories, and articles. Saman (1998) is widely considered her masterpiece. It was translated into English by Pamela Allen in 2005. By writing about sex and politics, Utami addressed issues formerly forbidden to Indonesian women, a change referred to as sastra wangi.

== Background ==
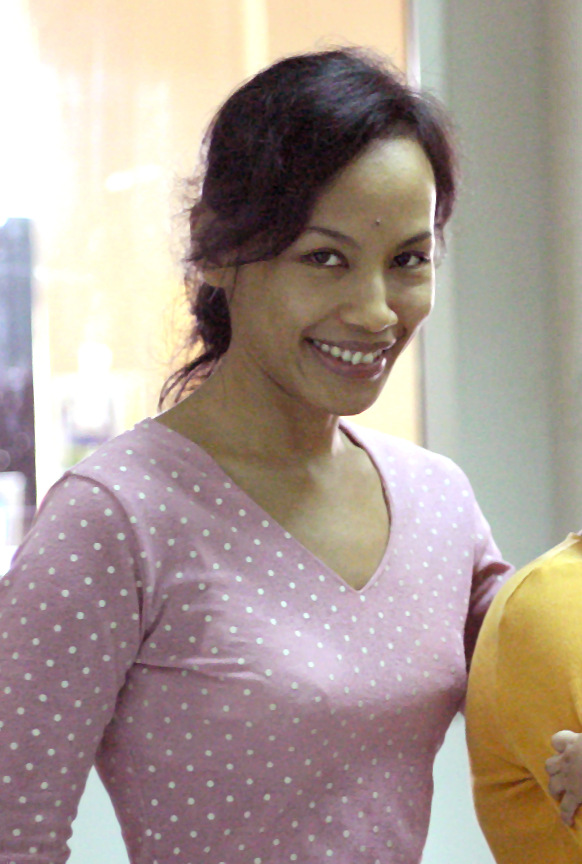
Utami in 2002

Utami was born in Bogor and grew up in the Indonesian capital, Jakarta. She obtained her bachelor's degree from the University of Indonesia, where she studied Russian language and literature. During her college years she began publishing reports and essays in newspapers. In 1990, she was selected as a finalist in Wajah Femina, a beauty pageant in Indonesia. However, she did not pursue a modelling career because of her dislike of cosmetics and make-up. She has been a journalist for Indonesian magazines, including Humor, Matra, Forum Keadilan, and D&R. Shortly after Suharto banned three magazines in 1994 (Tempo, Editor, and Detik) during the New Order era, Ayu joined Aliansi Jurnalis Independen (Alliance of Independent Journalists) to protest the ban. She continued her journalistic work underground, which included the anonymous publication of a black book on corruption in the Suharto regime.

Utami's first novel, Saman, appeared in 1998, only a few weeks before the fall of Suharto, helping to signal the changing cultural and political landscape in Indonesia. The novel won the Jakarta Arts Council's first prize that year and caused a sensation, and controversy, among Indonesian artists and intellectuals. It was acclaimed by many reviews and was considered a new milestone in Indonesian literature. Saman won the Prince Claus Award. It has sold over 100,000 copies and been reprinted 34 times. The sequel to Saman, Larung was published in 2001.

Ayu Utami currently works for Radio 68H, an independent news radio station that is broadcast all over the country, and as a writer for the cultural journal Kalam and in Teater Utan Kayu in Jakarta. Her play and book protesting against anti-pornography legislation, Pengadilan Susila (Susila's Trial), appeared in 2008.

== Saman ==
In Saman, Ayu Utami weaves together the twin stories of Indonesian feminist awakening and resistance to neo-colonial policies that devastated farmers and villagers during the Suharto era. The structure of the novel is complex, moving backwards and forwards in time from the 1990s to the 1980s and 1960s and among a variety of narrative points of view.

Saman provides an important critique of the New Order, which was overthrown by students and workers in 1998. Coming out from under the censorship of Suharto, Ayu Utami's novel is a daring expose of truths that could not be previously told. Its candid and celebratory treatment of new freedoms for women, including sexual freedom, were dramatic innovations when they appeared.

Utami treats social taboos in an open way, thereby breaking with Indonesian literature to date. She writes freely about love and sexuality and picks up the difficult relationship between Muslims and Christians as a central theme – as well as the hatred towards the Chinese minority. . . . Utami's prose is lively and modern, and as such reflects the richness of the Indonesian oral tradition. The author masterfully switches between various narrative perspectives, locations and time scales, links dream sequences and old myths with descriptions of the political and societal relations in Indonesia in the 1990s

Barbara Hatley argues that "a key 'innovation' of the text [Saman] is its subversion of long-standing conventions of female representation and women's writing in Indonesia, and of the concepts of womanly nature and gender relations in which these conventions are grounded."

== "Writing as Negating" ==
On 26 October 2005 Ayu Utami participated in a panel discussion on the topic "Why I Write What I Write" at the Iowa City Public Library, sponsored by the University of Iowa's International Writing Program. Her opening sentence states: "The beginning period of my fiction writing was probably a sort of adolescent struggle to negate the father figure." This figure, as the novels demonstrate, includes a variety of patriarchal social structures and institutions, literary conventions, and regimes such as that of former dictator Suharto.

== Pengadilan Susila (Susila's Trial) ==
In March 2008, Utami published Pengadilan Susila (Susila's Trial), based on the script of her theatre play Sidang Susila, co-authored by veteran playwright Agus Noor. According to The Jakarta Post, "Ayu considers her new book a weapon to fight against the morality movement and regulations that violate women's rights." The theatre piece and book grew out of Utami's involvement in protests against a proposed anti-pornography bill being discussed by the Indonesian House of Representatives. In an article covering the play's production by Yogyakarta's noted theatre troupe Teater Gandrik, actor Butet Kartaredjasa said the play exposed the camouflaged moral truths that the Constitution tries to enforce: "Sidang Susila hints at the dark shadows of an authoritarian regime that acts under the name of morality." A summary of the play goes like this:

Sidang Susila begins with the impact of the enforcement of the Law on Decency on the public. In the play, those believed to have violated decency are arrested by the authorities, including Susila, who is played by veteran actor Susilo Nugroho. The play then centrs on Susila, who is put behind bars, powerless, by the state authorities. Susila is accused of "committing" pornography for baring his large "breasts" in public, therefore violating the new law passed by the political elite. In fact, he is only a poor hawker of children's toys and has committed no wrong. The arresting officer in the play ignores Susila's claims that he is in fact a man, and that his chest is enlarged due to a tumor. Susila is then incarcerated and tried. It is here that the rulers act arbitrarily. The official interrogation report is made by force and the court proceedings are directed to cater to the rulers' wishes.

== Works ==
- Saman, KPG, Jakarta, 1998. Trans. English by Pamela Allen, 2005 and published by Equinox Publishing, Jakarta
- Larung, 2002
- Si Parasit Lajang (an Essay Compilation), GagasMedia, Jakarta, 2003
- Cerita Cinta Enrico, KPG, Jakarta, 2012
- Pengakuan Eks Parasit Lajang
- Bilangan Fu, Jakarta 2008
- Manjali dan Cakrabirawa, KPG, Jakarta 2010. ISBN 978-979-91-0260-7
- Lalita
- Pengadilan Susila (Susila's Trial)
- Ruma Maida (Maida's House; 2009; as screenwriter)

== Honors and awards ==
- 1st Prize of Jakarta Arts Council Novel Competition 1998
- Prince Claus Award 2000
