= Sastra wangi =

Indonesian literary genre

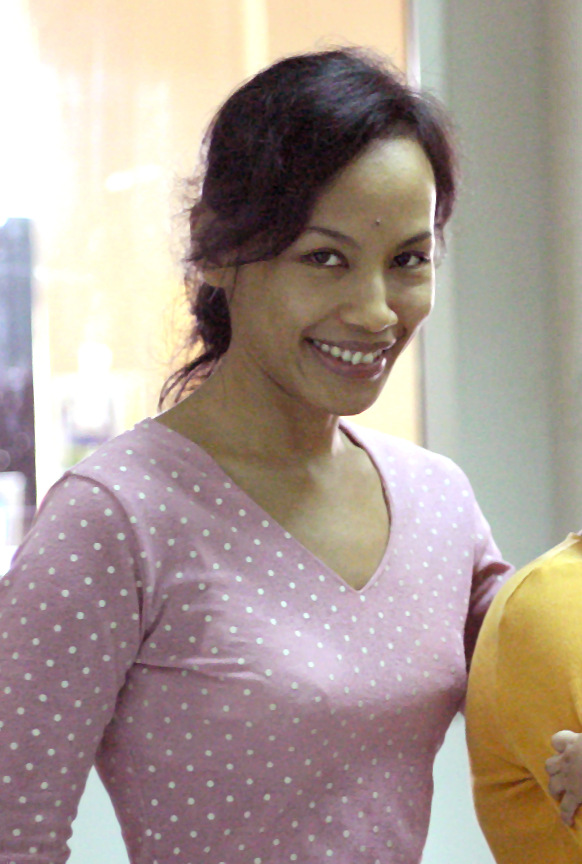
Ayu Utami, whose 1998 novel Saman has been credited as starting the sastra wangi movement

Sastra wangi (also spelled sastrawangi; literally 'fragrant literature') is a label given to a new body of Indonesian literature written by young, urban Indonesian women who take on controversial issues such as politics, religion and sexuality. Initiating the movement was writer Ayu Utami's best-selling first novel, Saman (1998), a contemporary view of Indonesian society published two weeks before the downfall of President Suharto. Large numbers of similar works by young women have followed.

== Label ==
The controversial label sastra wangi originated among predominantly male critics in the early 2000s to categorize such young, female writers as Ayu Utami, Dewi Lestari, Fira Basuki and Djenar Maesa Ayu.

There's always a tendency to categorize literary work, and sastra wangi is one such category ... The media came up with [the name] because we weren't the typical writers who used to lead the local literary scene. Beyond that, I don't know the meaning or significance of sastra wangi. —Ayu Utami

Feminist writer Julia Suryakusuma notes that reception of the label has been mixed. Those against the label argue that it demeans women, as if it "implies the authors are secondary and unintellectual, producing inferior works popular only because of looks and sensuality". Despite the controversy, the sastra wangi label has resulted in publicity and focused attention on the writers' style, word use and subject matter. Suryakusuma writes that "they cross sectors of class, ethnicity and religion, do not bear the psychological, political and ideological burdens of the New Order and explore daring sexual themes – taboo-breaking even."

The label has met with criticism from the writers themselves. Djenar Maesa Ayu, known for works such as Jangan Main-main Dengan Kelaminmu and Mereka Bilang, Saya Monyet!, considers the categorization "a kind of sexual harassment of her work". Mariana Amiruddin, manager of the women's magazine Jurnal Perempuan, argues that the label categorizes women based on their bodies, and as such does not consider their work as serious as that of male authors.

== History ==
The sastra wangi movement is generally considered to have been initiated by Ayu Utami with her novel Saman. Arising after a period of heavy repression during Suharto's New Order government, the work inspired other young women writers to publish similarly-themed works, including poems, short stories, and novels. Critics – mostly male – labeled the nascent movement sastra wangi and took offense at the lack of femininity in the works.

Utami's first novel, which fused sex and politics, was regarded as introducing dramatic Indonesian literature, and led other young female writers such as Djenar Maesa Ayu and Fira Basuki to boldly take on subjects once considered forbidden for women. Utami herself has continued to write works with similar themes.

== Themes and commonalities ==
A. Junaidi and Suryakusuma, writing in The Jakarta Post, note that sastra wangi writers have several things in common. The works tend to be launched in cafes and bookstores, with celebrities and reporters invited. The writers themselves are younger women, generally entering the industry around the age of 30, and often physically attractive.

The works usually deal openly with sexuality, traditionally a taboo subject in Indonesian women's literature. This includes homosexuality. Suryakusuma notes that the traditional patriarchal view of sex, with the man as the subject and woman as the object, is reversed in these works, with women aggressively seeking and enjoying sex. The diction can be explicit, with terms such as penis and vagina being common. The diction and subject matter are often "shocking". Although works from a female perspective have been common in Indonesian literature, with works by Nh. Dini from the 1970s including references to sexuality, they were generally within the realm of social mores; the sastra wangi movement tends to go against these mores.

== Reception ==
M. Taufiqurrahman, writing in The Jakarta Post, notes that several works by the sastra wangi movement have been well-received internationally. Suryakusuma notes that the sastra wangi works have "spearheaded literary development" in Indonesia since Saman was released. Although historically, Indonesian literature has not been commercially successful within the country, with most novels selling only several thousand copies and even large publishers only producing print runs of 3,000 or less, works by Djenar Maesa Ayu and Ayu Utami have sold tens of thousands of copies. Saman itself sold 100,000 copies.

The poet Taufiq Ismail was heavily opposed to the sastra wangi movement, writing that "genital literature had gone too far". Meanwhile, the novelist and literary scholar Sapardi Djoko Damono wrote that the future of Indonesian literature was "in the hands of women writers".

== Notable members and works ==
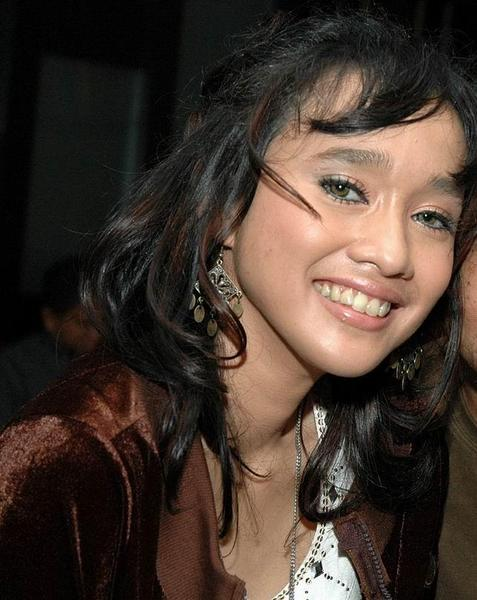
Nova Riyanti Yusuf

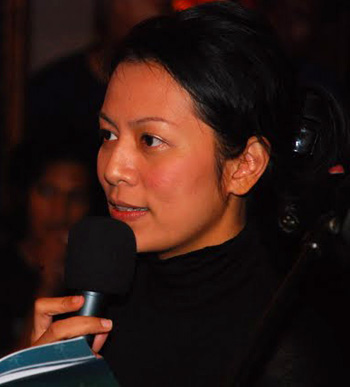
Dewi Lestari

- Ana Maryam

- Mata Matahari (Eye of the Sun; 2003)

- Ayu Utami

- Saman (1999)
- Larung (2001)
- Bilangan FU (2008)

- Dewi "Dee" Lestari

- Supernova heksalogi

- Dinar Rahayu

- Ode Untuk Leopold von Sacher Masoch (An Ode to Leopold von Sacher Masoch; 2002)

- Djenar Maesa Ayu

- Mereka Bilang, Saya Monyet! (They Say I'm a Monkey!; 2002)
- Jangan Main-Main (dengan Kelaminmu!) (Don't Play [with your genitals!]; 2004)
- Nayla (2005)

- Fira Basuki

- Jendela-Jendela trilogy (Windows; 2001)

- Maya Wulan

- Swastika (2004)

- Nova Riyanti Yusuf

- Mahadewa Mahadewi (2003)
- Imipramine (2004)
- 3some (2005)

- Ratih Kumala

- Tabula Rasa (Law of Feeling; 2004)
