= 2002 World Junior Championships in Athletics – Men's 100 metres =

The men's 100 metres event at the 2002 World Junior Championships in Athletics was held in Kingston, Jamaica, at National Stadium on 16 and 17 July.

== Medalists ==
Gold	Darrel Brown; Trinidad and Tobago
Silver	Marc Burns; Trinidad and Tobago
Bronze	Willie Hordge; United States

== Results ==
=== Final ===
17 July
Wind: -0.6 m/s

Rank	Name	Nationality	Time	Notes
1st place, gold medalist(s)	Darrel Brown	Trinidad and Tobago	10.09	
2nd place, silver medalist(s)	Marc Burns	Trinidad and Tobago	10.18	
3rd place, bronze medalist(s)	Willie Hordge	United States	10.36	
4	Tamunosiki Atorudibo	Nigeria	10.38	
5	Rashaad Allen	United States	10.39	
6	Brendan Christian	Antigua and Barbuda	10.43	
7	Saad Al-Shahwani	Qatar	10.51	
8	Winston Hutton	Jamaica	10.53	

=== Semifinals ===
17 July

==== Semifinal 1 ====
Wind: +1.4 m/s

Rank	Name	Nationality	Time	Notes
1	Marc Burns	Trinidad and Tobago	10.18	Q
2	Tamunosiki Atorudibo	Nigeria	10.32	Q
3	Willie Hordge	United States	10.35	Q
4	Brendan Christian	Antigua and Barbuda	10.35	Q
5	Ricardo Pacheco	Portugal	10.50	
6	Roman Smirnov	Russia	10.55	
7	Ivor-Tit Jurisic	Croatia	10.63	
8	Eliezer de Almeida	Brazil	10.69	

==== Semifinal 2 ====
Wind: +1.9 m/s

Rank	Name	Nationality	Time	Notes
1	Darrel Brown	Trinidad and Tobago	10.21	Q
2	Rashaad Allen	United States	10.37	Q
3	Winston Hutton	Jamaica	10.45	Q
4	Saad Al-Shahwani	Qatar	10.46	Q
5	Cédric Nabe	Switzerland	10.55	
6	Daniël Ward	Netherlands	10.64	
7	James Mortimer	New Zealand	10.67	
	Yahya Ibrahim	Saudi Arabia	DNS	

=== Quarterfinals ===
16 July

==== Quarterfinal 1 ====
Wind: +1.6 m/s

Rank	Name	Nationality	Time	Notes
1	Brendan Christian	Antigua and Barbuda	10.23	Q
2	Saad Al-Shahwani	Qatar	10.32	Q
3	Cédric Nabe	Switzerland	10.52	Q
4	James Mortimer	New Zealand	10.55	Q
5	Kristof Beyens	Belgium	10.58	
6	Taiwo Ajibade	Nigeria	10.61	
7	Ryosuke Igumi	Japan	10.72	
8	Simon Maestra	Spain	11.26	

==== Quarterfinal 2 ====
Wind: +3.9 m/s

Rank	Name	Nationality	Time	Notes
1	Willie Hordge	United States	10.25 w	Q
2	Daniël Ward	Netherlands	10.27 w	Q
3	Winston Hutton	Jamaica	10.30 w	Q
4	Yahya Ibrahim	Saudi Arabia	10.45 w	Q
5	Bruno Góes	Brazil	10.45 w	
6	Fabrice Lapierre	Australia	10.48 w	
7	Marius Broening	Germany	10.50 w	
8	Adam Gaj	Poland	10.51 w	

==== Quarterfinal 3 ====
Wind: +2.6 m/s

Rank	Name	Nationality	Time	Notes
1	Marc Burns	Trinidad and Tobago	10.32 w	Q
2	Roman Smirnov	Russia	10.38 w	Q
3	Ricardo Pacheco	Portugal	10.39 w	Q
4	Ivor-Tit Jurisic	Croatia	10.52 w	Q
5	Churandy Martina	Netherlands Antilles	10.52 w	
6	Yusuke Nii	Japan	10.54 w	
7	Lorenzo La Naia	Italy	10.58 w	
8	Andreás Karagiannis	Greece	10.69 w	

==== Quarterfinal 4 ====
Wind: +1.4 m/s

Rank	Name	Nationality	Time	Notes
1	Darrel Brown	Trinidad and Tobago	10.17	Q
2	Rashaad Allen	United States	10.34	Q
3	Tamunosiki Atorudibo	Nigeria	10.35	Q
4	Eliezer de Almeida	Brazil	10.54	Q
5	Denis Kondratyev	Kazakhstan	10.55	
6	Dániel Ágoston	Hungary	10.55	
7	Adam Miller	Australia	10.58	
	Jurica Grabušić	Croatia	DNS	

=== Heats ===
16 July

==== Heat 1 ====
Wind: +0.7 m/s

Rank	Name	Nationality	Time	Notes
1	Brendan Christian	Antigua and Barbuda	10.36	Q
2	Ricardo Pacheco	Portugal	10.45	Q
3	Fabrice Lapierre	Australia	10.56	Q
4	Jurica Grabušić	Croatia	10.62	q
5	Cédric Nabe	Switzerland	10.71	q
6	Jorge Luis Solórzano	Guatemala	10.84	
7	Juma Al-Jabri	Oman	10.98	
8	Adrian Durant	U.S. Virgin Islands	11.30	

==== Heat 2 ====
Wind: -1.2 m/s

Rank	Name	Nationality	Time	Notes
1	Simon Maestra	Spain	10.72	Q
2	James Mortimer	New Zealand	10.77	Q
3	Taiwo Ajibade	Nigeria	10.79	Q
4	Jeon Deok-Hyung	South Korea	10.83	
5	Hank Palmer	Canada	10.84	
6	Samarn Yanphiboon	Thailand	10.88	
7	Robert Ibeh	Cayman Islands	11.09	
8	Artush Simonyan	Armenia	11.27	

==== Heat 3 ====
Wind: +0.2 m/s

Rank	Name	Nationality	Time	Notes
1	Roman Smirnov	Russia	10.61	Q
2	Adam Gaj	Poland	10.70	Q
3	Lorenzo La Naia	Italy	10.70	Q
4	Efthímios Steryioúlis	Greece	10.71	
5	Yahya Saed Al-Kahes	Saudi Arabia	10.79	
6	David Dylus	Germany	10.82	
7	Facundo Troche	Paraguay	11.23	
8	Jaheed Smith	Belize	12.52	

==== Heat 4 ====
Wind: -0.3 m/s

Rank	Name	Nationality	Time	Notes
1	Willie Hordge	United States	10.59	Q
2	Churandy Martina	Netherlands Antilles	10.73	Q
3	Yusuke Nii	Japan	10.81	Q
4	James Dolphin	New Zealand	10.81	
5	Lamine Sanyang	Gambia	10.86	
6	Tidiane Coulibaly	Mali	11.22	
7	Fabian Florant	Dominica	11.27	

==== Heat 5 ====
Wind: -0.1 m/s

Rank	Name	Nationality	Time	Notes
1	Darrel Brown	Trinidad and Tobago	10.49	Q
2	Ryosuke Igumi	Japan	10.74	Q
3	Kristof Beyens	Belgium	10.77	Q
4	Gergely Nagy	Hungary	10.82	
5	Sergio Riva	Italy	10.88	
6	Lamine Khalache	Algeria	11.04	
7	Miguel Flores	Honduras	11.57	

==== Heat 6 ====
Wind: -1.3 m/s

Rank	Name	Nationality	Time	Notes
1	Saad Al-Shahwani	Qatar	10.71	Q
2	Ivor-Tit Jurisic	Croatia	10.82	Q
3	Bruno Góes	Brazil	10.86	Q
4	Cyril Bapte	France	10.90	
5	Michał Bielczyk	Poland	10.91	
6	Henrico Louis	Mauritius	10.99	
7	Moroni Rubio	Mexico	11.02	

==== Heat 7 ====
Wind: 0.0 m/s

Rank	Name	Nationality	Time	Notes
1	Tamunosiki Atorudibo	Nigeria	10.48	Q
2	Denis Kondratyev	Kazakhstan	10.57	Q
3	Eliezer de Almeida	Brazil	10.61	Q
4	Yahya Ibrahim	Saudi Arabia	10.64	q
5	Emmanuel Ngom	Cameroon	10.74	
6	Shameer Ayub	Singapore	10.75	
7	Pablo Colville	Chile	10.76	
8	Marlon Martin	Saint Vincent and the Grenadines	10.91	

==== Heat 8 ====
Wind: +1.5 m/s

Rank	Name	Nationality	Time	Notes
1	Winston Hutton	Jamaica	10.46	Q
2	Rashaad Allen	United States	10.48	Q
3	Adam Miller	Australia	10.57	Q
4	Andreás Karagiannis	Greece	10.70	q
5	Petr Svoboda	Czech Republic	10.79	
6	Pierre de Windt	Aruba	10.96	
7	Stephane Rabel	Haiti	11.01	
8	Ralph Soguilon	Philippines	11.13	

==== Heat 9 ====
Wind: +1.7 m/s

Rank	Name	Nationality	Time	Notes
1	Marc Burns	Trinidad and Tobago	10.45	Q
2	Marius Broening	Germany	10.54	Q
3	Daniël Ward	Netherlands	10.61	Q
4	Dániel Ágoston	Hungary	10.62	q
5	Diego Valdés	Chile	10.77	
6	Luis Oscar Jiménez	Mexico	10.97	
7	Stellan Ndibi	Gabon	11.21	
8	Aung Nay	Myanmar	11.30	

== Participation ==
According to an unofficial count, 69 athletes from 53 countries participated in the event.

- Algeria (1)
- Antigua and Barbuda (1)
- Armenia (1)
- Aruba (1)
- Australia (2)
- Belgium (1)
- Belize (1)
- Brazil (2)
- Cameroon (1)
- Canada (1)
- Cayman Islands (1)
- Chile (2)
- Croatia (2)
- Czech Republic (1)
- Dominica (1)
- France (1)
- Gabon (1)
- Gambia (1)
- Germany (2)
- Greece (2)
- Guatemala (1)
- Haiti (1)
- Honduras (1)
- Hungary (2)
- Italy (2)
- Jamaica (1)
- Japan (2)
- Kazakhstan (1)
- Mali (1)
- Mauritius (1)
- Mexico (2)
- Myanmar (1)
- Netherlands (1)
- Netherlands Antilles (1)
- New Zealand (2)
- Nigeria (2)
- Oman (1)
- Paraguay (1)
- Philippines (1)
- Poland (2)
- Portugal (1)
- Qatar (1)
- Russia (1)
- Saint Vincent and the Grenadines (1)
- Saudi Arabia (2)
- Singapore (1)
- South Korea (1)
- Spain (1)
- Switzerland (1)
- Thailand (1)
- Trinidad and Tobago (2)
- United States (2)
- U.S. Virgin Islands (1)
