= 2002 World Junior Championships in Athletics – Men's 4 × 100 metres relay =

The men's 4×100 metres relay event at the 2002 World Junior Championships in Athletics was held in Kingston, Jamaica, at National Stadium on 20 and 21 July.

== Medalists ==
Gold	Ashton Collins; Wes Felix; Ivory Williams; Willie Hordge; United States
Silver	Winston Hutton; Orion Nicely; Yhann Plummer; Usain Bolt; Jamaica
Bronze	Chevon Simpson; Marc Burns; Kevon Holder; Darrel Brown; Trinidad and Tobago

== Results ==
=== Final ===
21 July

Rank	Nation	Competitors	Time	Notes
1st place, gold medalist(s)	United States	Ashton Collins; Wes Felix; Ivory Williams; Willie Hordge	38.92	
2nd place, silver medalist(s)	Jamaica	Winston Hutton; Orion Nicely; Yhann Plummer; Usain Bolt	39.15	
3rd place, bronze medalist(s)	Trinidad and Tobago	Chevon Simpson; Marc Burns; Kevon Holder; Darrel Brown	39.17	
4	Brazil	Eliezer de Almeida; Bruno Góes; Jorge Sena; Bruno Pacheco	39.76	
5	Italy	Lorenzo La Naia; Alessandro Rocco; Andrew Howe; Sergio Riva	39.86	
6	Germany	Marius Broening; Sebastian Ernst; David Dylus; Peter Rapp	40.00	
7	Japan	Ryosuke Igumi; Shinji Takahira; Yusuke Nii; Kazuteru Matsumoto	40.05	
8	France	Cyril Bapte; David Alerte; Cédrick Audel; Idrissa Mbarke	40.14	

=== Heats ===
20 July

==== Heat 1 ====
Rank	Nation	Competitors	Time	Notes
1	Jamaica	Winston Hutton; Orion Nicely; Yhann Plummer; Usain Bolt	39.38	Q
2	Trinidad and Tobago	Chevon Simpson; Marc Burns; Kevon Holder; Darrel Brown	39.50	Q
3	France	Cyril Bapte; David Alerte; Cédrick Audel; Idrissa Mbarke	39.93	q
4	Italy	Lorenzo La Naia; Alessandro Rocco; Andrew Howe; Sergio Riva	40.16	q
5	Australia	Kris Neofytou; John Thornell; Fabrice Lapierre; Adam Miller	40.51	
6	Greece	Yeóryios Sabánis; Dimítrios Diamadáras; Ioánnis Tzógas; Efthímios Steryioúlis	40.55	
	Chile	Nicolás Sepúlveda; Kael Becerra; Diego Valdés; Pablo Colville	DQ	

==== Heat 2 ====
Rank	Nation	Competitors	Time	Notes
1	United States	Ashton Collins; Wes Felix; Ivory Williams; Willie Hordge	39.18	Q
2	Brazil	Eliezer de Almeida; Bruno Góes; Jorge Sena; Bruno Pacheco	39.75	Q
3	Japan	Ryosuke Igumi; Shinji Takahira; Yusuke Nii; Kazuteru Matsumoto	39.82	q
4	Germany	Marius Broening; Sebastian Ernst; David Dylus; Till Helmke	39.85	q
5	New Zealand	Clint Grooby; James Mortimer; Hayden Townsend; James Dolphin	40.35	
6	Poland	Adam Gaj; Robert Majchrzak; Grzegorz Olszanski; Paweł Ptak	40.59	
7	Singapore	Izwan Bin Hanif; Poh Seng Song; Fawy Rawi Erzalmaniq; Shameer Ayub	41.87	

== Participation ==
According to an unofficial count, 57 athletes from 14 countries participated in the event.

- Australia (4)
- Brazil (4)
- Chile (4)
- France (4)
- Germany (5)
- Greece (4)
- Italy (4)
- Jamaica (4)
- Japan (4)
- New Zealand (4)
- Poland (4)
- Singapore (4)
- Trinidad and Tobago (4)
- United States (4)
