= 2001 World Youth Championships in Athletics =

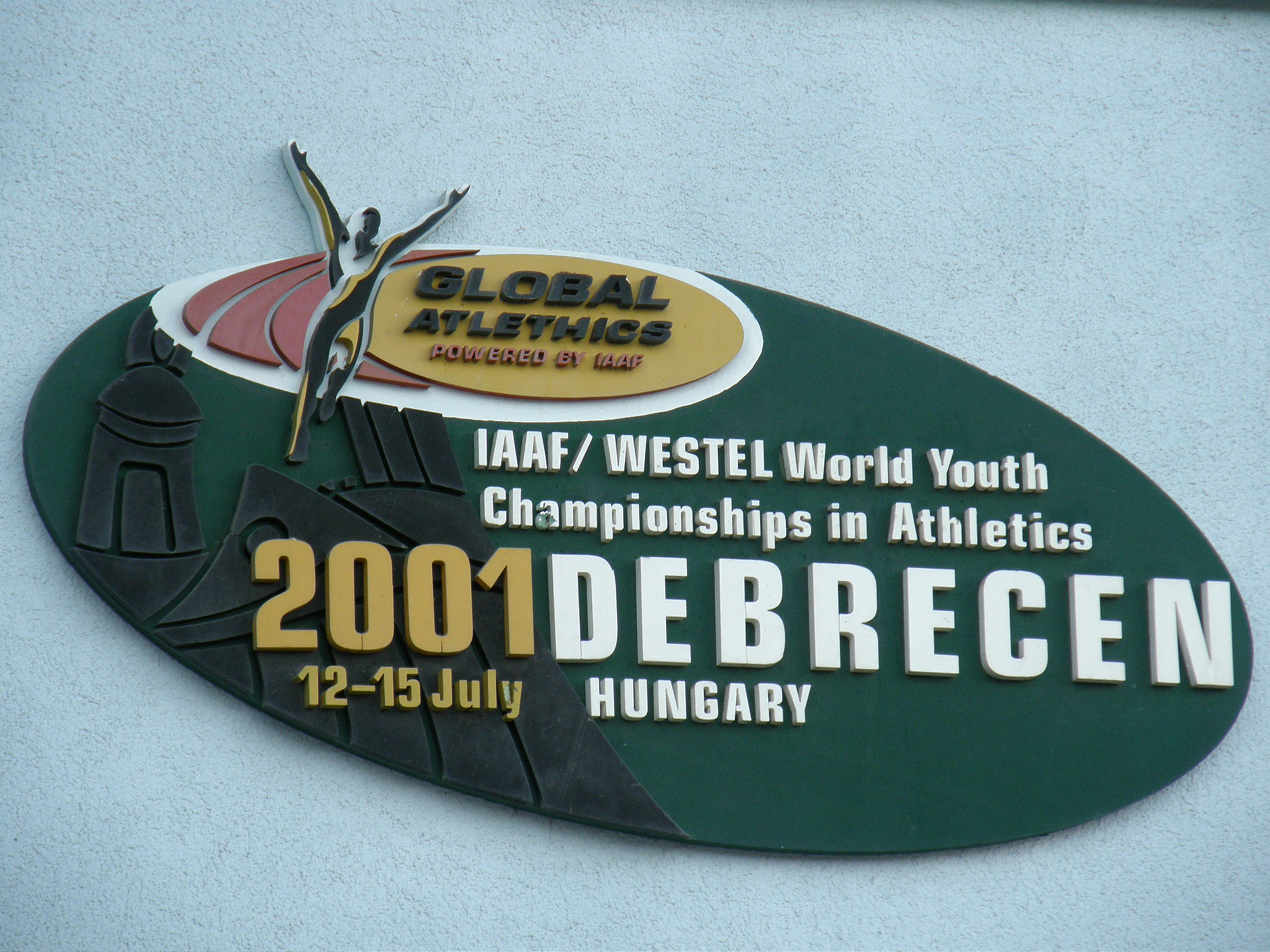
- Dates: 12–15 July 2001
- Host city: Debrecen, Hungary
- Venue: Gyulai István Athletic Stadium
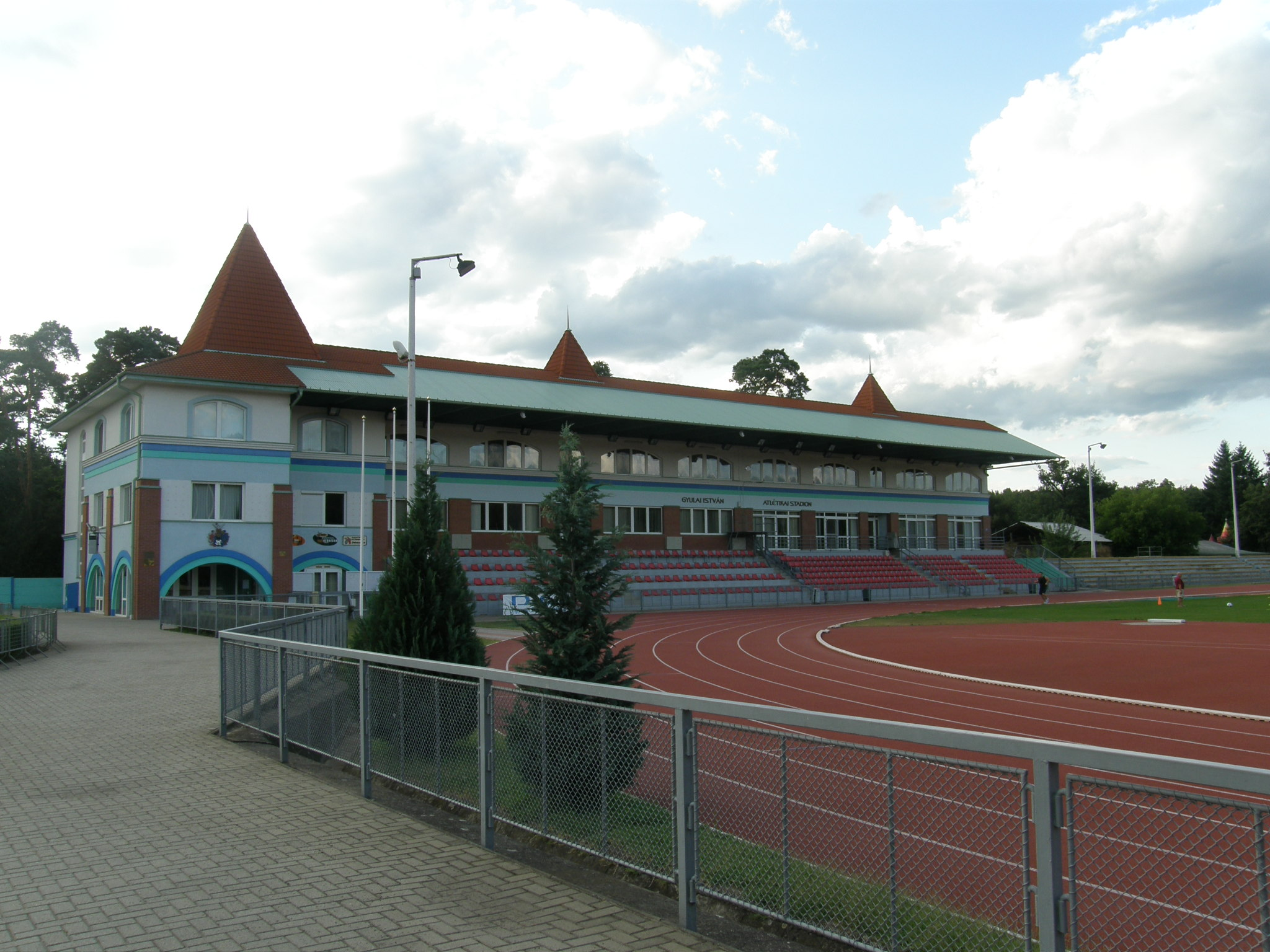
- Level: Youth (under 18)
- Events: 39

The 2001 World Youth Championships in Athletics was the second edition of the World Youth Championships in Athletics. It was held in Debrecen, Hungary 12–15 July 2001.

== Results ==
=== Boys ===
Event	Gold		Silver		Bronze	
100 m	Darrel Brown; Trinidad and Tobago	10.31 CR	Willie Hordge; United States	10.41	Jonathan Wade; United States	10.53
200 m	Jonathan Wade; United States	20.95	Michael Grant; United States	21.30	Dion Rodriguez; Trinidad and Tobago	21.36
400 m	Karol Grzegorczyk; Poland	46.90	Piotr Kędzia; Poland	47.12	Jermaine Gonzales; Jamaica	47.51
800 m	Salem Amer Al-Badri; Qatar	1:50.15	Cosmas Rono; Kenya	1:50.35	Liao Fu-Pin; Chinese Taipei	1:51.35
1500 m	Isaac Songok; Kenya	3:36.78 CR	Samuel Dadi; Ethiopia	3:39.78	Abdulrahman Sulaiman; Qatar	3:42.03
3000 m	Markos Geneti; Ethiopia	7:55.82	David Kilel; Kenya	7:56.95	James Kwalia; Kenya	7:57.71
2000 m St.	David Kirwa; Kenya	5:33.40	Brimin Kipruto; Kenya	5:36.81	Abrham Kebeto; Ethiopia	5:37.76
110 m H 91.4 cm	Nassim Meziane Ibrahimi; Qatar	13.27	Marthinus van der Vyver; South Africa	13.35	Eddy De Lépine; France	13.39
400 m H 84.0 cm	Amin Mohammed Al-Ozon; Syria	50.25	Jonathan Walker; United States	51.32	Kenji Narisako; Japan	52.09
10,000 m track walk	Vladimir Kanaykin; Russia	42:55.75	Mikhail Seredovich; Belarus	43:44.32	Francisco Flores; Mexico	43:53.13
Medley relay	Poland; Tomasz Kaska; Piotr Zrada; Piotr Kędzia; Karol Grzegorczyk	1:50.46	United States; Jonathan Wade; Michael Grant; Willie Hordge; Jonathan Walker	1:50.90	South Africa; Samuel Brits; Marthinus van der Vyver; Leigh Julius; Louis Van Zyl	1:51.35
High jump	Aleksey Dmitrik; Russia	2.23	James Watson; Australia	2.21	Aleksandr Plisko; Belarus	2.19
Pole vault	Artyom Kuptsov; Russia	5.15	Vincent Favretto; France	5.15	Go Kishita; Japan	5.00
Long jump	Thiago Dias; Brazil	7.72	Ibrahim Abdulla Al-Waleed; Qatar	7.62	Andrew Howe Besozzi; Italy	7.61
Triple jump	Jonathan Moore; Great Britain	16.36	Arnie David Giralt; Cuba	16.33	Osniel Tosca; Cuba	15.67
Shot put 5 kg	Georgi Ivanov; Bulgaria	19.73	Yasser Ibrahim Farag; Egypt	19.58	Lee Min-Won; South Korea	19.57
Discus 1.500 kg	Khalid Habash Al-Suwaidi; Qatar	62.67	Robert Harting; Germany	62.04	Omar Ahmed El Ghazali; Egypt	61.06
Hammer 5 kg	József Horváth; Hungary	80.11	Werner Smit; South Africa	79.48	Kirill Ikonnikov; Russia	77.75
Javelin 700g	Teemu Wirkkala; Finland	76.18	Hamed Al-Khalifa; Qatar	73.56	Tero Järvenpää; Finland	68.85
Octathlon	Rene Oruman; Estonia	6219	Essa Mufarrah; Saudi Arabia	6024	Jason Dudley; Australia	5997
WR world record | AR area record | CR championship record | GR games record | NR national record | OR Olympic record | PB personal best | SB season best | WL world leading (in a given season)

=== Girls ===
Event	Gold		Silver		Bronze	
100 m	Allyson Felix; United States	11.57	Kerron Stewart; Jamaica	11.72	Zuzana Kosová; Czech Republic	11.83
200 m	Angel Perkins; United States	23.07	Amy Spencer; Great Britain	23.45	Zuzana Kosová; Czech Republic	23.98
400 m	Stephanie Smith; United States	52.19	Jerrika Chapple; United States	52.80	Anneisha McLaughlin; Jamaica	53.35
800 m	Cherotich Ruto; Kenya	2:05.50	Veronika Plesarová; Czech Republic	2:06.01	Carlene Robinson; Jamaica	2:06.18
1500 m	Georgie Clarke; Australia	4:14.08	Florence Kyalo; Kenya	4:15.71	Sentayehu Ejigu; Ethiopia	4:17.51
3000 m	Sally Chepyego; Kenya	9:09.95	Mestewat Tufa; Ethiopia	9:11.60	Fridah Domongole; Kenya	9:12.70
100 m H 76.2 cm	Kathrin Geissler; Germany	13.49	Ashley Lodree; United States	13.75	Carla Fick; South Africa	13.75
400 m H	Camile Robinson; Jamaica	58.72	Kim Crow; Australia	59.28	Olga Nikolayeva; Russia	59.41
5000 m track walk	Jiang Kun; China	22:49.21	Kseniya Ischeykina; Russia	22:58.43	Snezhana Yurchenko; Belarus	23:28.51
Medley relay	United States; Ashley Lodree; Allyson Felix; Angel Perkins; Stephanie Smith	2:03.83	Jamaica; Shaunette Davidson; Kerron Stewart; Kashain Page; Anneisha McLaughlin	2:07.45	Romania; Mariana Bilal; Nadia Cocoranu; Gabriela Ciuca; Ioana Ciurila	2:09.70
High jump	Aileen Wilson; Great Britain	1.87	Petrina Price; Australia	1.81	Levern Spencer; Saint Lucia	1.81
Pole vault	Silke Spiegelburg; Germany	4.00	Aleksandra Kiryashova; Russia	4.00	Anna Olko; Poland	3.95
Long jump	Shermin Oksuz; Australia	6.41 CR	Elena Anghelescu; Romania	6.32	Angela Dies; Germany	6.03
Triple jump	Alina Popescu; Romania	13.76	Svetlana Bolshakova; Russia	13.32	Michelle Sanford; United States	13.22
Shot put	Valerie Adams; New Zealand	16.87 CR	Michelle Carter; United States	15.23	Yulia Leantsiuk; Belarus	15.08
Discus	Ma Xuejun; China	54.93 CR	Darya Pishchalnikova; Russia	49.37	Amarachi Ukabam; United States	46.13
Hammer	Andrea Kéri; Hungary	59.86	Berta Castells; Spain	59.65	Mariya Smaliachkova; Belarus	59.16
Javelin	Kimberley Mickle; Australia	51.83	Justine Robbeson; South Africa	51.54	Andrea Kvetová; Czech Republic	51.49
Heptathlon	Annett Wichmann; Germany	5470	Christine Schulz; Germany	5346	Amandine Constantin; France	5296
WR world record | AR area record | CR championship record | GR games record | NR national record | OR Olympic record | PB personal best | SB season best | WL world leading (in a given season)

== Medal table ==
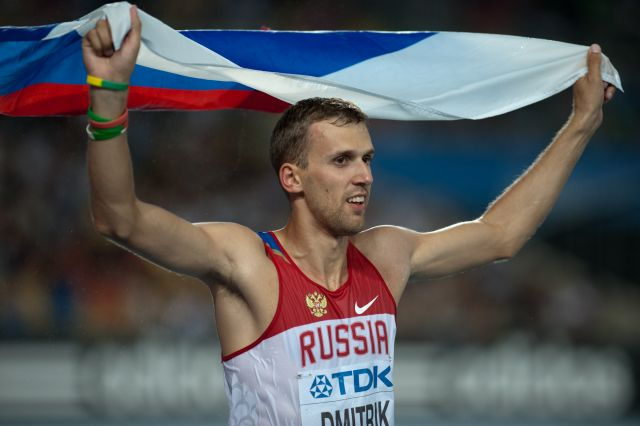
Aleksey Dmitrik of Russia won the high jump.

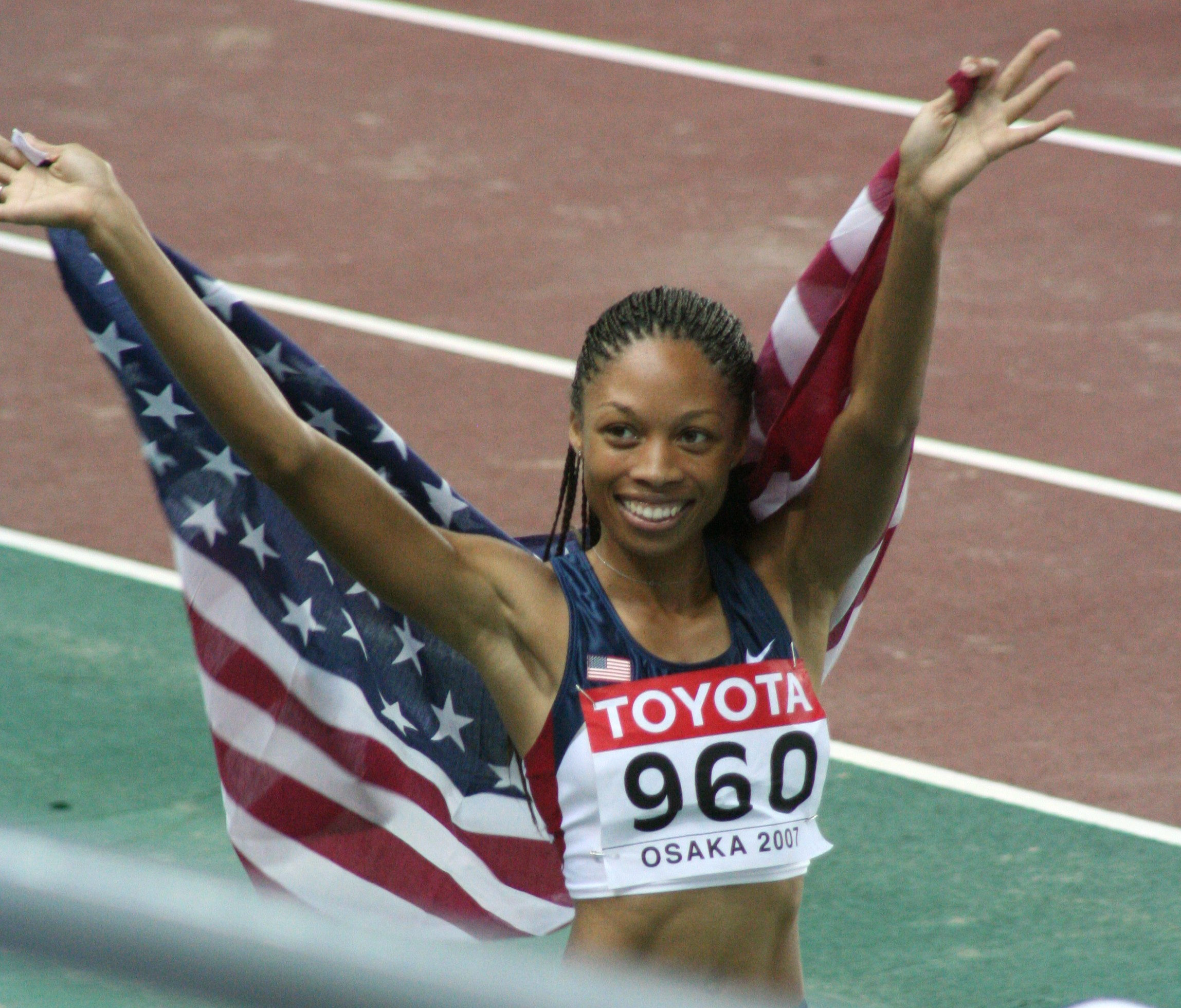
Allyson Felix of the USA won the gold in the 100 metres and the medley relay.

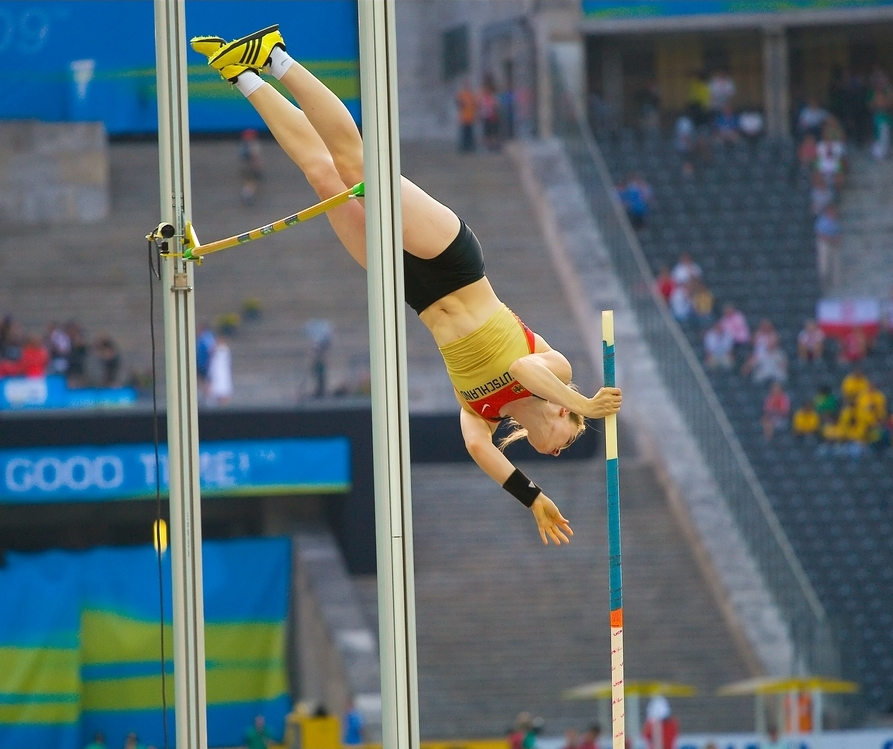
Silke Spiegelburg won the pole vault gold for Germany.

* Host nation (Hungary)

Rank	Nation	Gold	Silver	Bronze	Total
1	United States	5	7	3	15
2	Kenya	4	4	2	10
3	Russia	3	4	2	9
4	Australia	3	3	1	7
5	Qatar	3	2	1	6
6	Germany	3	1	1	5
7	Great Britain	2	2	0	4
8	Poland	2	1	1	4
9	China	2	0	0	2
9	Hungary*	2	0	0	2
11	Jamaica	1	2	3	6
12	Ethiopia	1	2	2	5
13	Romania	1	1	1	3
14	Finland	1	0	1	2
14	Trinidad and Tobago	1	0	1	2
16	Brazil	1	0	0	1
16	Bulgaria	1	0	0	1
16	Estonia	1	0	0	1
16	New Zealand	1	0	0	1
16	Syria	1	0	0	1
21	South Africa	0	3	2	5
22	Belarus	0	1	4	5
23	Czech Republic	0	1	3	4
24	France	0	1	2	3
25	Cuba	0	1	1	2
25	Egypt	0	1	1	2
27	Saudi Arabia	0	1	0	1
27	Spain	0	1	0	1
29	Japan	0	0	2	2
30	Chinese Taipei	0	0	1	1
30	Italy	0	0	1	1
30	Mexico	0	0	1	1
30	Saint Lucia	0	0	1	1
30	South Korea	0	0	1	1
Totals (34 entries)		39	39	39	117
