= Michael Grant (gridiron football) =

American football player (born 1986)

No. 17, 36
- Position: Cornerback/Safety

Personal information
- Born: March 30, 1986 (age 40); Philadelphia, Pennsylvania, U.S.
- Listed height: 5 ft 11 in (1.80 m)
- Listed weight: 185 lb (84 kg)

Career information
- College: Arkansas
- NFL draft: 2008: undrafted

Career history
- Jacksonville Jaguars (2008)*; Kansas City Chiefs (2008)*; Washington Redskins (2008–2009)*; Florida Tuskers (2009); Cleveland Browns (2009)*; Toronto Argonauts (2010)
- * Offseason or practice squad member only

Awards and highlights
- Second-team All-SEC (2007)

Michael Grant (born March 30, 1986) is an American former football cornerback and safety. He was signed by the Jacksonville Jaguars as an undrafted free agent in 2008. He played college football at Arkansas.

Grant was also a member of the Kansas City Chiefs, Washington Redskins, Florida Tuskers, and Cleveland Browns of the National Football League (NFL), and the Toronto Argonauts of the Canadian Football League (CFL).

== Early life ==
Grant grew up in Decatur, Georgia, where he made a name for himself in the youth summer track circuit winning a total of 12 USATF Junior Olympic championship titles, and as one of the most electrifying offensive players in Georgia Youth Football Association at the time. He attended Stephenson High School in Stone Mountain, Georgia, where he was a standout in football and track, winning a total of 5 GHSA track and field state championships (100 meters in 2003 and 2004, 200 meters in 2001 and 2003, and 400 meter relay in 2003), as well as collecting all state honors in football his senior year. He currently is the US record holder over 100 and 200 metres in the youth age group (13-14 yrs).

He participated in the 200 meters at the 2001 World Youth Championships in Athletics, winning a silver medal behind Jonathan Wade. Two years later at the 2003 World Youth Championships, he again finished second in the 200 meters, this time behind Usain Bolt.

== College career ==
A former two-sport athlete for the Razorbacks, Grant split his early career between track and football. Excelling at both free safety and cornerback, Grant earned Freshman SEC honors in 2004 and Second-team SEC honors his junior year and again his senior year, with a conference-leading 16 passes broken up and NCAA leading 26 passes defended.

Grant also ran for the college powerhouse Razorback track team and earned NCAA All American honors and an NCAA championship in the 400 meter relay as a freshman.
