= Muslim Burut =

Bruneian writer

Dato Paduka Muslim Burut DPMB
- مسلم بوروت
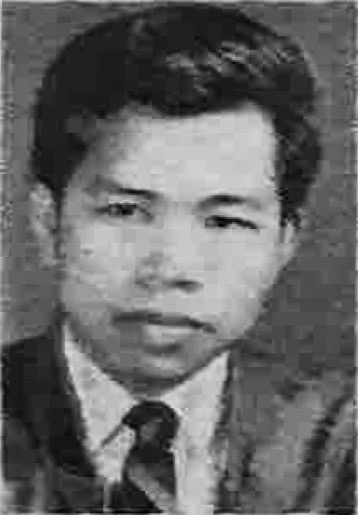
- Muslim in c. 1964
- Born: 15 April 1943; Kiarong, Brunei Town, Brunei
- Died: 15 June 2021 (aged 78); Kiarong, Bandar Seri Begawan, Brunei
- Education: Sultan Omar Ali Saifuddien College; University of Malaya; University of London
- Occupations: Writer; clerk
- Years active: 1966–2021
- Awards: Mastera Literary Award; S.E.A. Write Award

Muslim bin Haji Burut (15 April 1943 – 15 June 2021), pen name Muslim Burmat, was a writer from Brunei who wrote a great deal of literature, particularly novels and short stories that are used in Brunei's educational institutions. In addition to receiving numerous literary honours, his works—which are primarily realistic but also include fresh historiography—showcase aspects of Brunei society.

== Early life and education ==
Muslim obtained his early education at the Gadong Malay School and Sultan Muhammad Jamalul Alam Malay School. He taught Malay before continuing on to Sultan Omar Ali Saifuddien College for lower secondary education taught in English. After his third year, he departed to work for the Marine Department, and in 1964, he joined the Land Department as a clerk. He assisted the families of those imprisoned following the failed 1962 Brunei revolt, in which the military branch of the opposition Brunei People's Party sought to take control, during this time. He became an assistant author at the Language and Literature Bureau in 1966.

== Literature ==
Before releasing his debut novel, Muslim spent twenty years writing cerpen (short stories) under the pen name Muslim Burmat. Early writings that are set in Brunei but have English characters clearly reflect his interest in non-Bruneians, especially Westerners, and their interactions with the East. One defining aspect of his work is still his predilection for using conversation to establish character and convey ideas. He studied Malay studies at the University of Malaya in Kuala Lumpur during 1968. He spent his year in England, which included a few quick trips around the Continent, studying writing and publishing at the University of London's Institute of Education in Tropical Areas in 1971–1972. During the period when short stories with regional settings made up the majority of Bruneian fiction, his works are set in Europe and include multiracial non-Bruneian protagonists.

Muslim advanced through the Language and Literature Bureau ranks from assistant author to language officer to senior language officer. After retiring in 1996, he served as the University of Brunei Darussalam's writer-in-residence until 2000. While some of Muslim Burmat's novels are available in Malaysian university libraries, his books are only available in Brunei and have not been translated into any other language. His writing career has won him several awards for his prolific output of children's books, short tales, and novels.

Muslim died on 15 June 2021. At the Master's Literary Award Multaqa: Memoir Muslim Burmat, held at Balai Sarmayuda, the acting director of the Language and Library Council (DBP) mentioned a number of topics, including these ones, in his welcome address. The speaker observed that Muslim Burmat enjoys considerable regard as a literary personality both within and outside of his country due to the significant impact of his writings on nationalism.

== Personal life ==
Muslim was born on 15 April 1943, in Kiarong, Brunei Town of Kedayan ethnicity. He is one of the eight kids to his mother, Bani binti Ali, and father, Burut bin Ahmad, of which both were uneducated. After being married, Muslim had a single child with Kamsiah binti Sulaiman. He lives in his birthplace of Kiarong. upon addition to writing, he oversees Seri Bulan (Beautiful Moon), a restaurant he founded upon his retirement, and engages in his lifelong passion of bird raising.

== Books ==
Books Muslim has written, co-written and contributed are;

- Debu Berterbangan (Kuching: Borneo Literature Bureau, 1964).
- Jalinan (Kuching: Borneo Literature Bureau, 1967).
- Manis ku sayang (Kuching: Borneo Literature Bureau, 1967).
- Puntong dalam gerimis (Kuching: Borneo Literature Bureau, 1967).
- Gelas di atas meja (Kuching: Borneo Literature Bureau, 1973).
- Pelarian (Bandar Seri Begawan: Dewan Bahasa dan Pustaka Brunei, 1977).
- Anak ikan raja ikan (Bandar Seri Begawan: Dewan Bahasa dan Pustaka Brunei, 1980).
- Selangkir mata merah (Bandar Seri Begawan: Dewan Bahasa dan Pustaka Brunei, 1980).
- Lari bersama musim (Bandar Seri Begawan: Dewan Bahasa dan Pustaka Brunei, 1982).
- Hadiah sebuah impian (Bandar Seri Begawan: Dewan Bahasa dan Pustaka Brunei, 1983).
- Puncak pertama (Bandar Seri Begawan: Dewan Bahasa dan Pustaka Brunei, 1988).
- Pohon-pohon terbuang (Kuala Lumpur: Penamas, 1989).
- Dari sini kita bermula (Bandar Seri Begawan: Dewan Bahasa dan Pustaka Brunei, 1993).
- Sebuah pantai di negeri asing (Bandar Seri Begawan: Dewan Bahasa dan Pustaka Brunei, 1995).
- Terbenamnya matahari (Bandar Seri Begawan: Dewan Bahasa dan Pustaka Brunei, 1996).
- Urih pesisir (Bandar Seri Begawan: Universiti Brunei Darussalam, 1999).
- Terbang tinggi (Bandar Seri Begawan: Universiti Brunei Darussalam, 2002).
- Makna sebenar sebuah ladang (Bandar Seri Begawan: Dewan Bahasa dan Pustaka Brunei, 2002).
- Maka (Bandar Seri Begawan: Dewan Bahasa dan Pustaka Brunei, 2004).
- Bahana Rasa: Antoloji cherpen Bahana, contributions by Muslim Burmat (Bandar Seri Begawan: Dewan Bahasa dan Pustaka Brunei, 1975).
- Yahya M.S., ed., Tali Kikik Tali Teraju: Antologi cerpen, contributions by Muslim Burmat (Bandar Seri Begawan: Dewan Bahasa dan Pustaka Brunei, 1976).
- Untaian Mekar: Antoloji cherpen kanak-kanak, contributions by Muslim Burmat (Bandar Seri Begawan: Dewan Bahasa dan Pustaka Brunei, 1976).
- Bunga rampai Melayu Brunei, edited by Muslim Burmat and Abdullah Hussein (Kuala Lumpur & Bandar Seri Begawan: Dewan Bahasa dan Pustaka Brunei, 1984).
- Siti Zaleha Haji Kaprawi, ed., Puncak bicara: Cerpen-cerpen yang menang di dalam peraduan menulis cerpen tahun 1982, anjuran Dewan Bahasa dan Pustaka, contributions by Muslim Burmat (Bandar Seri Begawan: Dewan Bahasa dan Pustaka Brunei, 1985).

== Awards and honours ==
Throughout Muslim's career, he has earned the following awards and honours;

=== Awards ===
- Southeast Asian Writers Award (1986)
- Mastera Literary Award (2001, 2006, 2007)
- Nusantara Literary Award (1999, 2002)
- Outstanding Writer of Brunei (2002)

=== Honours ===
- Order of Seri Paduka Mahkota Brunei Second Class (DPMB; 15 July 2006) – Dato Paduka
- Order of Seri Paduka Mahkota Brunei Third Class (SMB)
- Meritorious Service Medal (PJK)
- Excellent Service Medal (PIKB; 15 July 1970)
- Long Service Medal (PKL)

== Bibliography ==
- Haji Muhammad, Morsidi (2003). Muslim Burmat Dan Karyanya: Satu Analisis Stilistik (Muslim Burmat and his works: stylistic analysis). Berakas: Dewan Bahasa dan Pustaka Brunei, Kementerian Kebudayaan, Belia dan Sukan.
- Muslim Burmat dan historisisme baru (Muslim Burmat and new historicism). Dewan Bahasa dan Pustaka Brunei, Kementerian Kebudayaan, Belia dan Sukan. 2018.
