= Rahimidin Zahari =

Malaysian poet

- رحيمي الدين ظاهري
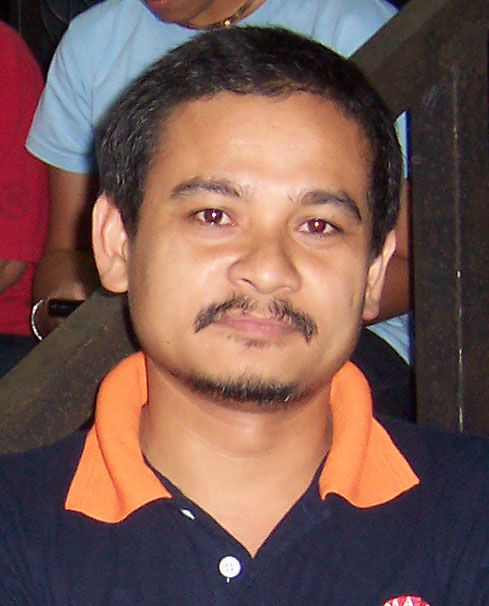
- Born: Rahimidin Zahari; March 28, 1968; Bechah, Keranji Kelantan, Malaysia
- Died: May 14, 2015 (aged 47); Kuala Lumpur
- Resting place: Bachah, Keranji Kelantan
- Citizenship: Malaysia
- Education: Universiti Sains Malaysia
- Occupations: poet, short-story writer, dramatist
- Writing career
- Language: Malay
- Years active: 1990–2015
- Notable awards: Mastera Laureate, 2013

Rahimidin Zahari (March 28, 1968, Bachah, Keranji, Kelantan – May 14, 2015, Kuala Lumpur) was a Malaysian poet.

== Short biography ==
In 2003, he graduated from the University of Sciences of Malaysia (Penang), department of fine arts. In the years 1988-1989. participated in the program of literary creativity at the same university.

Participant of the Second ASEAN Writers' Conference in the Philippines and Istiqlal II Festival in Indonesia, representative of Malaysia at the International Festival of Poetry "Kuala Lumpur 2002", participant of the Poetry Festival "South Korea-ASEAN" (Seoul, December 10–16, 2010). He was also keen of traditional art forms. The last years of his life he was the editor of the quarterly theater magazine "Pentas" (Stage), as well as the treasurer of the organization "National Writer" (Pena).

== Creativity ==
In addition to poetry, he also wrote plays and novels. One of the plays "Rebab Berbisik" was successfully shown in April. 2011 on the small stage of the prestigious "Palace of Culture" in Kuala Lumpur. The theme of the short stories is the correlation of tradition and modernity, sadness about the disappearing traditions of Malay culture, especially the shadow puppet theater wayang".

== Impression ==
... The poet’s poems are full of images, mystery and subtle sensations. Many of them permeate the sense of the inevitability of our departure from earthly life. But this is not pessimism: beyond the visible life is eternity. - Victor A. Pogadaev

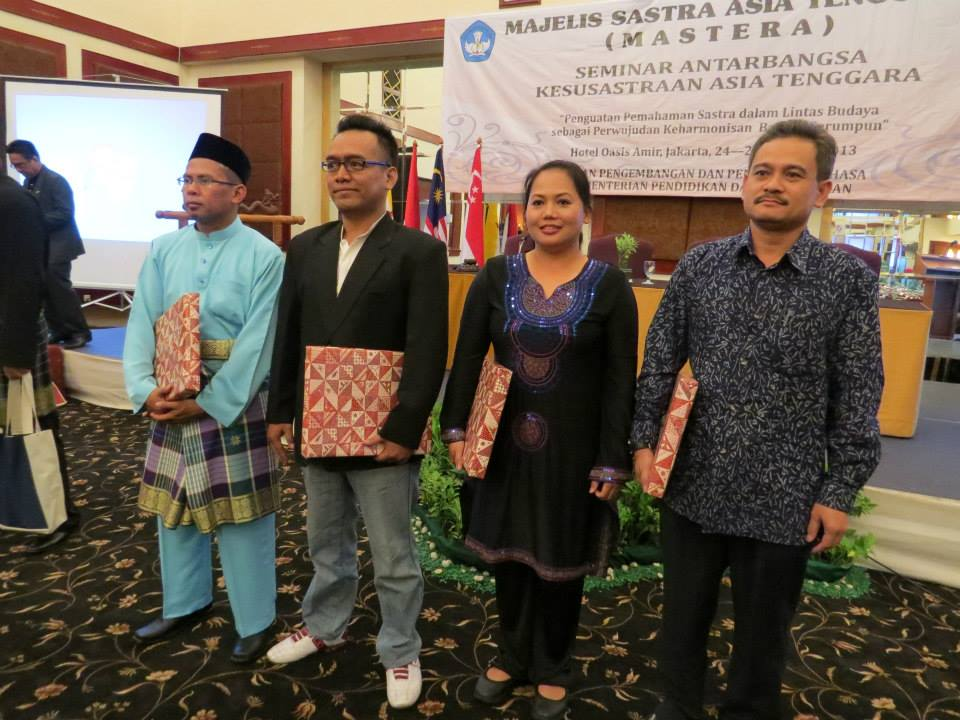
Rahimidin Zakhari (far right) at the Mastera Literary Award Ceremony (October 24, 2013)

== Awards ==
- The first prize at the poetry contest of the Council for Language and Literature of Malaysia (1986);
- Award to the best young writer Esso-Gapena (1991)
- National Award of the Shapadu-Gapena Competition (1992)
- National Award of Esso-Gapena (1995)
- Award "Islam Darul-Imam III" (1997).
- Literary Prize of Malaysia (2004)
- Mastera Literary Award (2013)
- Runner-up Prize Prize of the Malaysian Institute of Translation and the Book (2015)
- Prize and title "A Man of Culture of Kuala Lumpur" (2015, posthumously)

== Publications ==
- Rahimidin Zahari. Sekepal Tanah (A handful of earth). Kuala Lumpur: DBP 1995.
- Rahimidin Zahari. Matahari Berdoa (Prayer of the Sun). Kota Bharu: GEMA, 1998.
- Rahimidin Zahari. Di Kebun Khatulistiwa (In the garden at the Equator). Kuala Lumpur: DBP 2005.
- Rahimidin Zahari. Sand Castle. Selected poems by Rahimidin Zahari. Compilation and translation from Malay by Victor Pogadaev. M .: Klyuch C, 2007.
- Rahimidin Zahari. Perjalanan Salik (In Search of Knowledge). Bangi: Pustaka Nusa, 2009.
- Rahimidin Zahari. Aksara (Letters). Shah Alam: Ilmu Bakti, 2009.
- Rahimidin Zahari, Sutung Umar RS et al. Makyung. The Mystical Heritage of Malaysia. Kuala Lumpur: Institut Terjemahan Negara Malaysia, 2011.
- Abdullah Muhamad, Rosli K. Matari, Azmi Yusoff, Rahimidin Zahari. Kumpulan Sajak ABRAR (Collection of Poems ABRAR). Kota Bharu: Persatuan Penulis Kelantan, 2011.
- Rahimidin Zahari. Perahu Fansuri (The Fansuri Boat). Kuala Lumpur: Sindiket Soljah, 2011.
- Rahimidin Zahari dkk. Puisi Orang Bertujuh (Poetry of the Seven). Kuala Lumpur: PENA, 2011.
- Rahimidin Zahari. Rawana. Bangi: Pustaka Nusa, 2011. (40 poems in Malay with translation into English).
- Rahimidin Zahari. Bayang Beringin (Shadow of the Beringin). Kuala Lumpur: PENA, Institut Terjemahan & Buku Malaysia, 2013.
- Rahimidin Zahari. Wayang Kulit. Shadow Play. The Folk Epic of the Malay Archipelago. Translated by Siti Hajar Mohamad Yusof, Shahnaz Mohd. Said, Solehah Ishak. Kuala Lumpur. Institute Terjemahan dan Buku Malaysia, 2013.
- Rahimidin Zahari. Laut Tujuh Gelombang Buih (The Sea of Seven Foamy Wave). Collection of Poems. Kuala Lumpur: Institut Terjemahan & Buku Malaysia, 2014.
- Rahimidin Zahari. Sehelai Daun Kenangan (A Leaf of Memories). Collection of Poems. Kuala Lumpur: Institut Terjemahan & Buku Malaysia, 2015.
- Rahimidin Zahari. Kulukiskan Engkau Biru Dan Engkau Bertanya Kenapa Tidak Merah Jambu Seperti Warna Kesukaanku? (I Paint you Blue, and You Ask Why it's not Pink, as My Favorite Color?). Kuala Lumpur: Institut Terjemahan & Buku Malaysia, 2016.
