= S. M. Zakir =

Malaysian writer

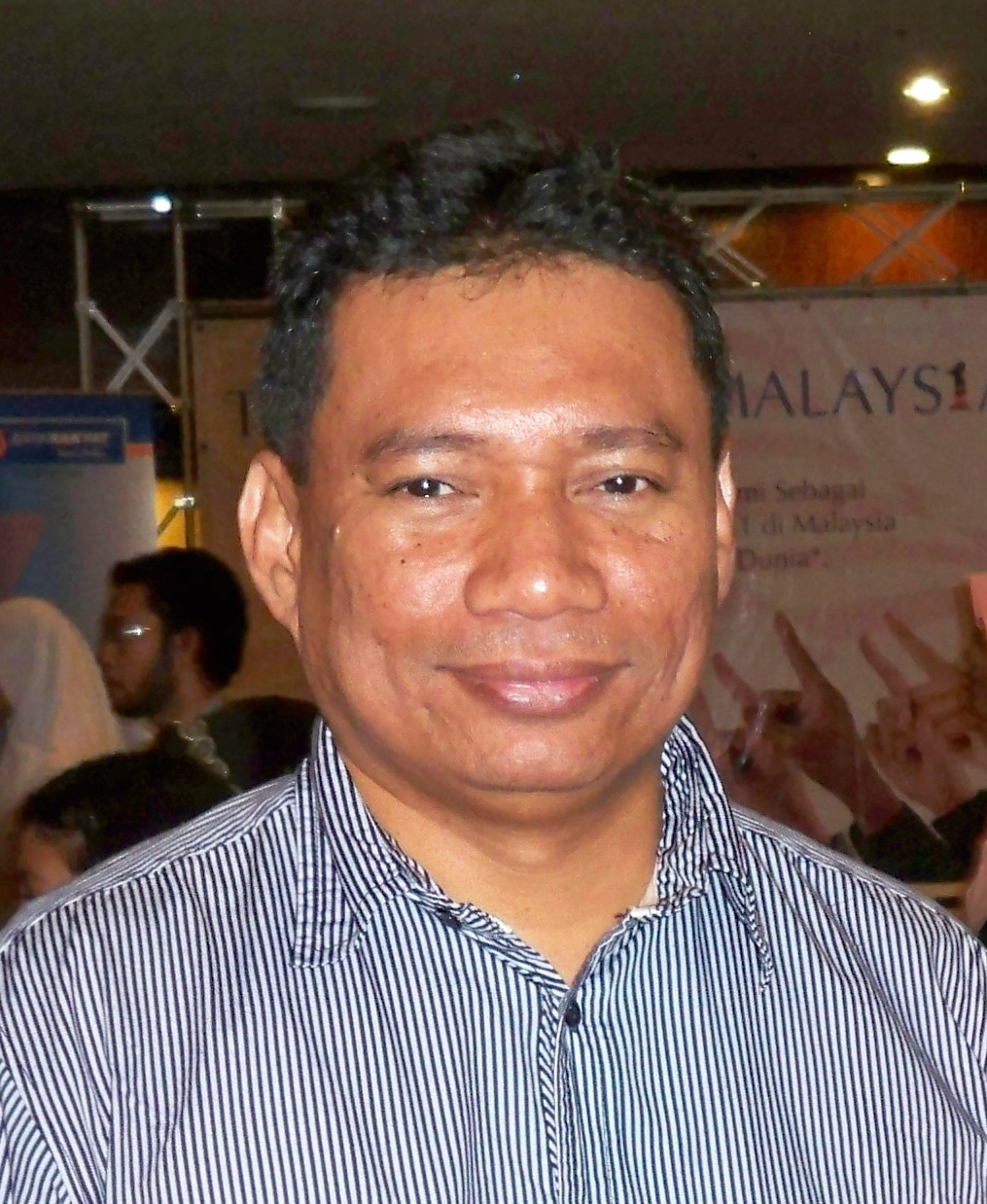
- S. M. Zakir (Syed Mohd Zakir)
- Born: Syed Mohd Zakir Syed Othman Al-Yahya; 4 February 1969 (age 57); Kota Bharu, Kelantan
- Citizenship: Malaysia
- Education: Computer Programming (Universiti Teknologi MARA) and Business Studies (Institute of Commercial Management)
- Alma mater: Penang Free School, Penang; Bandar Baru Bangi Secondary School, Selangor; and Higher Secondary School, Kajang, Selangor
- Occupation: Writer
- Writing career
- Pen name: S. M. Zakir (Syed Mohd Zakir)
- Language: Malay
- Genres: Short stories, essays, poetry, and novels
- Subject: Malaysian Literature
- Website: smzakir.com

Syed Mohd Zakir Bin Syed Othman Al-Yahya (born 4 February 1969 in Kota Bharu, Kelantan, Malaysia), is a Malaysian writer of prose, poetry, and theatrical texts.

== Biography ==
S.M. Zakir involves himself in the writing of short stories, essays, poetry, and novels. Some of his works were published in magazines and journals, such as Dewan Sastera, Dewan Budaya, Dewan Masyarakat, Pelita Bahasa, Bahasa, Dewan Siswa, Perisa Journal, Malay Literature Journal, Pangsura Journal, Aswara Journal, Milenia Muslim, Pentas, and others; and newspapers like Berita Minggu, Berita Harian, Utusan Melayu, Utusan Zaman, Minggu Malaysia, and others. His published works in book forms are an adolescent novel Di Bawah Lembayung (DBP, 1991); a classical novel Kembang Kanigara (DBP, 1992), novel Ahli Politik (Nusabuku, 2012), compilations of short stories Merengkuh Langit (DBP, 1995), Fatamorgana (Sasbadi, 1997), Sekuntum Kembang di Sayap Jibril (Pustaka Nusa Publication, 2001), Menyirat Nirmala (DBP, 2004), Sekeping Ruh di Atas Bantal (PPN, 2005), and Serigala dan Sekuntum Tulip (DBP, 2010); poetry compilations Memburu Malaikat (PPN, 2007), and Sajak-sajak Petualang: Manusia Cinta (PPN, 2009); and a luxurious edition biography Seniman Negara Ke-7 Datuk (Dr) Ahmad Nawab (JKKN, 2008). He also produced a book of philosophical essays Pascamoden Kutukan Terhadap Falsafah dan Agama (Nusabuku, 2010).

He is also active in writing criticism on films, theatres and culture. Among his books of essays on film criticism are Sinema (Nusabuku, 2010) and Filem dan Pemikiran (Nusabuku, 2010). He was also a columnist of Mingguan Watan 1996–1998, editor for literary magazine Akar, short stories analyst for Tunas Cipta magazine December 2003 – December 2006, writer for novel in series in Milena Muslim magazine July 2004 – March 2007, columnist for "Review" (films) column, "Pemikiran Islam" and "Kerana Nila Setitik" (Community) for Milenia Muslim magazine 2006-now, columnist for Massa magazine (politics) 2005–2006, columnist for "Kuala Lumpur Selepas Senja (Theatre) for Pentas magazine, columnist for "Dunia Tanpa Tirai" (Politics) for Mingguan Wasilah tabloid January 2008 – May 2009, and columnist for culture and general column in Suara Baru magazine August 2008 – March 2009.

He has the experience as a jury panel for tens of literary competitions since 2002, and speaker in tens of literary workshops since 2003. He was also invited to present tens of working papers at home and abroad, such as Indonesia, Negara Brunei Darussalam, Singapore and Thailand. In writers' organisation, he was Deputy Co-ordinator for Young Writers' Secretariat in GAPENA (SPMG) 2002–2003 and Secretary-General for Persatuan Penulis Nasional Malaysia (PENA) 2006–2008 session, 2008–2010 session, and 2010–2012 session. He is now a freelance writer besides managing his own publishing house Nusabuku Enterprise, and establishing Nusa Centre, a research centre for culture and science.

== Awards ==
- 2010 Anugerah Sasterawan Muda MASTERA 2010 (MASTERA Young Laureate Award 2010) from the Literary Council of Southeast Asia (Mastera Literary Award) in Jakarta, Indonesia.
- 2011 S.E.A Write Award 2011 in short story category, awarded by SEA Write Award Council in Bangkok, Thailand. Malaysian Premier Literary Prizes
- Utusan-Public Bank Literary Prizes
- Utusan-ExxonMobil Literary Prizes
- DBP-Maybank Literary Prizes
- DBP-DBKL Literary Prize in commemoration with Kuala Lumpur Centennial
- Formula Malaysia Literary Prize
- State of Kelantan Literary Awards
- Film criticism award by GAPIM

== Publications ==
- Adolescent Novel Di Bawah Lembayung (Dewan Bahasa dan Pustaka. Kuala Lumpur. 1991)
- Classic Novel Kembang Kanigara (Dewan Bahasa dan Pustaka. Kuala Lumpur.1992)
- Short Stories Compilation Merengkuh Langit (Dewan Bahasa dan Pustaka. Kuala Lumpur. 1995)
- Anthology of Short Stories Fatamorgana (Sasbadi. Kuala Lumpr.1997)
- Compilation of Short Stories Sekuntum Kembang di Sayap Jibril (Pustaka Nusa Publication Sdn. Bhd. Selangor. 2001)
- Compilation of Short Stories Menyirat Nirmala (Dewan Bahasa dan Pustaka. Kuala Lumpur. 2004)
- Compilation of Short Stories Sekeping Ruh di Atas Bantal (Pustaka Nusa Publication Sdn. Bhd. Selangor. 2005)
- Compilation of Poems Memburu Malaikat (Pustaka Nusa Publication Sdn. Bhd. Selangor. 2006)
- Biography (luxurious edition) of 7th National Artist Datuk (Dr) Ahmad Nawab (Jabatan Kebudayaan dan Kesenian Negara/National Department for Culture and Arts. 2008)
- Poetry Compilation Sajak-sajak Petualang; Manusia Cinta (Pustaka Nusa Publication Sdn. Bhd. Selangor. 2009)
- Compilation of Essays (Socio-politics) Dunia Tanpa Tirai (Pustaka Nusa Publication Sdn. Bhd. Selangor. 2009)
- Compilation of Essays (Philosophy) Pascamoden Kutukan Terhadap Falsafah & Agama (Pustaka Nusa Publication Sdn. Bhd. Selangor. 2010)
- Compilation of Essays (Films) Sinema (Pustaka Nusa Publication Sdn. Bhd. Selangor. 2010)
- Compilation of Essays (Critics on Films) Filem & Pemikiran (Pustaka Nusa Publication Sdn. Bhd. Selangor. 2010)
- Compilation of Short Stories Serigala dan Sekuntum Tulip (Dewan Bahasa dan Pustaka/Institute of Language and Literature. KualaLumpur. 2010)
- Novel Ahli Politik (Nusabuku Enterprise, Kuala Lumpur. 2012)

== Short stories ==
List of S.M. Zakir's short stories that received awards/prizes

Short stories	Awards
Debu-debu Jalan	Consolation Prize (Adolescent) in Utusan-Public Bank Literary Prize 1990
Mimpi Senapati	First Prize in DBP-DBKL Short Stories Writing Competition in Commemoration With Kuala Lumpur Centennial, 18 February 1990
Garis-garis Paralel	Consolation Prize in DBP-Malayan Banking Short Stories Prizes 1992
Enigma Daripada Sebuah Noumena	Main Prize (General) in Utusan-Public Bank Literary Prizes 1992
Relung, Pelita, Kaca, Pohon dan Zaitun	Second Prize in DBP-Malayan Banking Literary Prizes 1993
Seorang Lelaki dan Sebuah Laut	Consolation Prize (General) in Utusan-Public Bank Literary Prizes 1993
Mahd (?)	Consolation Prize (General) in Utusan-Public Bank Literary Prizes 1994
Tanah dan Udaraku	Main Prize (General) in Utusan-Public Bank Literary Prizes 1995
Mahakarya	Consolation Prize in Formula Malaysia 2000
Cinta Sekerdip Embun	Main Prize (Adolescent) in Utusan-Public Bank Literary Prizes 1999
Perahu	Main Prize (General) in Utusan-Public Bank Literary Prizes 1999
Syair Bunga dan Pasir	Main Prize (General) in Utusan-Public Bank Literary Prizes 2000
Cinta Si Pemain Pedang	Loose Prize in Malaysian Premier Literary Prizes 2000/2001
Dunia Simulacra	Loose Prize in Malaysian Premier Literary Prizes 2000/2001
Langit Putih di Bogor	Main Prize (General) in Utusan-Public Bank Literary Prizes 2002
Malam Bertangkup di Aidilfitri	Consolation Prize (General) in Utusan- Public Bank Literary Prizes 2002
Sungai Emasmu Chao Phraya	Main Prize (Adolescent) Utusan-ExxonMobil Literary Prizes 2003
Si Penggaru Kalbu	Loose Prize in Perdana Literary Prizes 2002/2003
Hikayat Pulau dan Lelaki	Main Prize (General) in Utusan-ExxonMobil Literary Prizes 2004
Aku dan Sang Raja	Consolation Prize (General) in Utusan-ExxonMobil Literary Prizes 2004
Pasir di Bawah Belati	Consolation Prize (General) in Utusan-ExxonNMobil Literary Prizes 2005
Matahari di Atas Sejadah	Main Prize (Adolescent) in Utusan Group Literary Prizes 2006
Masjid	Consolation Prize (General) in Utusan-ExxonMobil Literary Prizes 2008
Kisah Sebatang Pokok	Consolation Prize (General) in Utusan-ExxonMobil Literary Prizes 2009

== Literary Essays ==
- Orientalisme, Weltliteratur Gharb Zadegi & Sastera Melayu, Main Prize (Article) in Utusan-ExxonMobil Literary Prizes 2003
- Cinta Dalam Konsep Saeculum, GAPIM Tinta Prizes 2008 (Essay on Films – Dewan Budaya, February 2007)
- Penulis Ulul Albab dan Newman, Main Prize (Essay) in Utusan-ExxonMobil Literary Prizes 2008

== Poetry ==
- Sepotong Cinta di Dunia Angin, Main Prize (Poetry) in Utusan-ExxonMobil Literary Prizes 2008
- Aroma, Main Prize (Poetry) in Utusan-ExxonMobil Literary Prizes 2009 and Malaysian Premier 19th Literary Prizes (2008–2009) Loose Category (Poems)

== Compilations of Short Stories ==
- Merengkuh Langit (DBP, 1995), Malaysian Premier Literary Prizes 1994/1995 Compilation of Short Stories Category
- Sekuntum Kembang di Sayap Jibril, The State of Kelantan Literary Awards 2001–2002 Compilation of Short Stories Category

== Theatre ==
Cinta Si Pemain Pedang. Was staged at DBP Store, Dewan Bahasa dan Pustaka, Kuala Lumpur, on 15–18 November 2006.
