= Fabian Florant =

Dominican born Dutch triple jumper

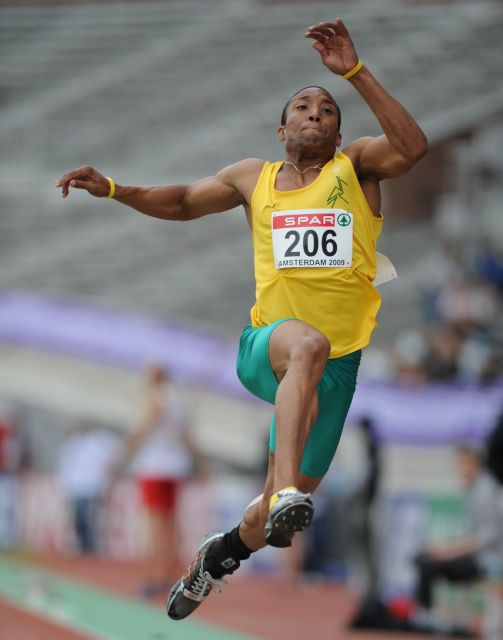
- Florant at the 2009 Dutch championships

Personal information
- Nationality: Dominican and Dutch
- Born: 1 February 1983 (age 43) Mahaut, Dominica
- Education: Missouri State University

Fabian Florant (born 1 February 1983) is a Dominican born Dutch triple jumper. Florant qualified to compete at the 2016 Summer Olympics in Rio de Janeiro, Brazil in the men's triple jump.

== Personal life ==
Florant was born on 1 February 1983 in Roseau, Dominica. He attended St Mary's Primary and St Mary's Academy schools on the island. He holds a Dutch passport through his Dutch mother. He attended Lindenwood University from 2002 to 2004, then later graduated from Missouri State University in 2006 with a Bachelors of Science in finance. He also received a master's degree in Administration with Business and Sports Management Emphasis in 2009.

== Athletics ==
As a junior in Dominica Florant set national records in the under-17s triple jump, under-20s 100 metres and the senior 4 × 100 metres relay. He won a bronze medal at the 1999 CARIFTA Games in the under-17s triple jump. At the 2002 World Junior Championships in Athletics, held in Kingston, Jamaica, he represented Dominica, finishing seventh in his heat in the 100 metres. Whilst at Lindenwood University he won both the indoor and outdoor National Association of Intercollegiate Athletics triple jump titles in 2003 and was second in the 2004 indoor competition. He was named an All-American on four occasions.

Florant has won nine Dutch triple jump titles, five outdoors and four indoors. He competed at the 2012 European Athletics Championships in Helsinki, Finland, representing the Netherlands in the men's triple jump. He placed 13th in the qualifying round with a jump of 16.35 metres but did not advance to the final. At the 2013 European Athletics Indoor Championships in Gothenburg, Sweden, he reached the final of the triple jump and broke his own national indoor record whilst finishing eighth. During his outdoor season, Fabian also won the European Team Championships-1st League which was held in Dublin, Ireland.

In 2014 the Dutch Athletics Federation withdrew funding for triple jump athletes and Florant was forced to re-enter the corporate world by taking a job as a portfolio manager at a bank in Florida in the United States, where he was also training.

In 2016 at a track & field professional competition in Clermont, Florida, he set a new personal best and Dutch record with a jump of 16.92 meters, beating the standard of 16.85 meters required for qualification for the 2016 Summer Olympics in Rio de Janeiro, Brazil. He also won the European Club Championships-1st League in Leiria, Portugal. Florant is 20x undefeated Dutch Champion (Indoor & Outdoor) and record holder for both. Today, Fabian is considered the best triple jumper in the history of The Netherlands.

Personal Best in Triple Jump – Indoor: 16.75m Outdoor: 16.92m Long Jump Outdoor- 7.69m
