= József Horváth (athlete) =

Hungarian hammer thrower

Personal information
- Born: 2 April 1984 (age 42)

Sport
- Country: Hungary
- Sport: Athletics
- Event: Hammer throw

Achievements and titles
- Personal best: Hammer throw: 72.27 m (2004)

József Horvath (born 3 April 1984) is a Hungarian male hammer thrower, who won an individual gold medal at the Youth World Championships.
