= Cédric Nabe =

Swiss sprinter

Personal information
- Born: 16 June 1983 (age 43) Dardagny, Switzerland
- Height: 1.88 m (6 ft 2 in)
- Weight: 85 kg (187 lb)

Sport
- Country: Switzerland
- Sport: Athletics
- Event(s): 100 metres, 200 metres
- Club: Stade Genève

Cédric Mongha Nabe (born 16 June 1983) is a Swiss former sprinter who specialized in the 100 metres and 200 metres events. A multiple-time Swiss national champion, he represented Switzerland at international competitions including the 2009 World Championships in Athletics and the 2011 European Athletics Indoor Championships. His personal best in the 100 metres is 10.28 seconds.

== Career ==
Nabe studied in the United States on a track scholarship at Florida State University, graduating in 2008 with a degree in information technology. He competed for the FSU track team, earning All-American honors in the 4×100 metres relay, and helping win the ACC title in 2005.

He won the Swiss national title in the 100 metres in 2009 and qualified for the 2009 World Championships in Athletics in Berlin, where he ran 10.51 seconds in the heats. In 2011, he recorded a season's best of 10.30 seconds — the fastest Swiss time that year — and reached the final of the 60 metres at the 2011 European Athletics Indoor Championships in Paris, finishing seventh in 6.67 seconds.

In June 2011, Nabe was provisionally suspended by Antidoping Switzerland for failing to provide required athlete whereabouts information. He received a 12-month ban, later extended to 18 months following an appeal to the Court of Arbitration for Sport. This prevented him from competing at the 2012 European Championships and the Olympic Games. Nabe announced his retirement in January 2013.

== Personal life ==
After retiring from athletics, Nabe pursued a career in information technology and risk advisory. He joined Deloitte as a consultant, working in both the United States and Switzerland. As of the mid-2010s, he held the position of senior manager, and later became a partner at Deloitte Switzerland. He is of Swiss and Congolese descent and is fluent in multiple languages.

== Personal bests ==
- 100 metres: 10.28 s (2009)
- 60 metres: 6.67 s (2011, indoor)

== International competitions ==
Selected international competitions
Year	Competition	Venue	Event	Result	Notes
2009	World Championships	Berlin, Germany	100 m	10.51 s	6th in heat
2011	European Indoor Championships	Paris, France	60 m	6.67 s	7th in final

== See also ==
- List of doping cases in athletics
