= Willie Hordge =

American sprinter (born 1984)

Personal information
- Nationality: American
- Born: February 9, 1984 (age 42)
- Height: 5-ft-10-in (1.78 m)
- Weight: 212-lb (96 kg)

Sport
- Sport: Track & Field
- Events: 100m, Relays
- College team: Arkansas/Butler County CC

Achievements and titles
- Personal best: 100m: 10.03
Medal record
Men's athletics
Representing United States
World Junior Championships
Gold medal – first place	2002 Kingston	4×100 m
Bronze medal – third place	2002 Kingston	100 m
Pan American Junior Championships
Gold medal – first place	2003 Bridgetown	4×100 m
World Youth Championships
Silver medal – second place	2001 Debrecen	100 m

Willie Hordge (born February 9, 1984) is an American sprinter who specialized in the 100 meters.

At the 2001 World Youth Championships in Debrecen, Hungary, Hordge won a silver medal in 100 meters, finishing behind only Darrel Brown (10.31 to 10.41). In his junior season at Forest Brook High School in Houston, Texas, Hordge narrowly missed winning the Texas 4A 100-meter title to Brendan Christian 10.15 to 10.16. The following month, he won the 100 meters over Kelly Willie and Jonathan Wade in the Great Southwest Classic in Albuquerque, New Mexico, with a 10.21 clocking (+2.0 m/s wind). Horde still holds the 17-18 USATF Gulf Association record the 100 meters at 10.11 from that era.

Hordge participated in the 2002 World Junior Championships in Kingston, Jamaica, and finished with a bronze medal in 100 meters, placing third behind Darrel Brown and Marc Burns. Known for his slow start out of the blocks, officials at the meet were in amazement at how he closed at the finish. A few days later at the same meet, he anchored the United States 4x100 relay squad to Gold. Hordge received the baton identical to Usain Bolt of Jamaica, and then pulled away from him down the stretch, as he and teammates Ashton Collins, Wes Felix, and Ivory Williams set a new world junior record of 38.92. It was the fourth and fastest of five different 4x100 relays he anchored under 40 seconds in the space of three weeks. Just like he is today, Usain Bolt was the talk of the meet back then, and Hordge showed him up on his own soil in Kingston. Bolt was visibly upset after the finish. The day before Bolt had just won the 200 meters.

Hordge was the cover boy of the September 2002 edition of track & Field News. He was the 2002 "Nike Athlete of the Year".

At the 2003 Pan Am Junior Championships in Bridgetown, Barbados, the pair faced off again on anchor leg of the 4x100 meter relay. Hordge shocked Bolt again, and the United States won the gold in 39.29 to Jamaica's 39.40. This was just one day after Bolt had set the World Youth Best and equalled the World Junior Record in the 200 meters.

As a 181-pound (82 kg) football player with reputed 4.1 (actual 4.3) speed he was invited to play in the 2003 Oil Bowl. He was recruited to several high-profile schools, including the University of Arkansas, Texas A&M and Mississippi State University. He committed to Arkansas.

Hordge's entry was dependent on achieving NCAA eligibility. He struggled with the ACT test following football games, but was reported to have passed on his fourth attempt. Arkansas fell through, Hordge ended up going to Butler Community College along with Ivory Williams. He won the 2004 Kansas Relays while representing Butler. He held the 200 meters meet record at the Masked Rider Open for ten years. He ended up at Buffalo State, winning the 2007 NCAA D3 National Championship at both 100 meters and 200 meters his junior year, but at a reported 212 pounds (96 kg), he was no longer running world class times. He was "New York State Track Athlete of the Year" that year.
