= Mastera Literary Award =

Literary award

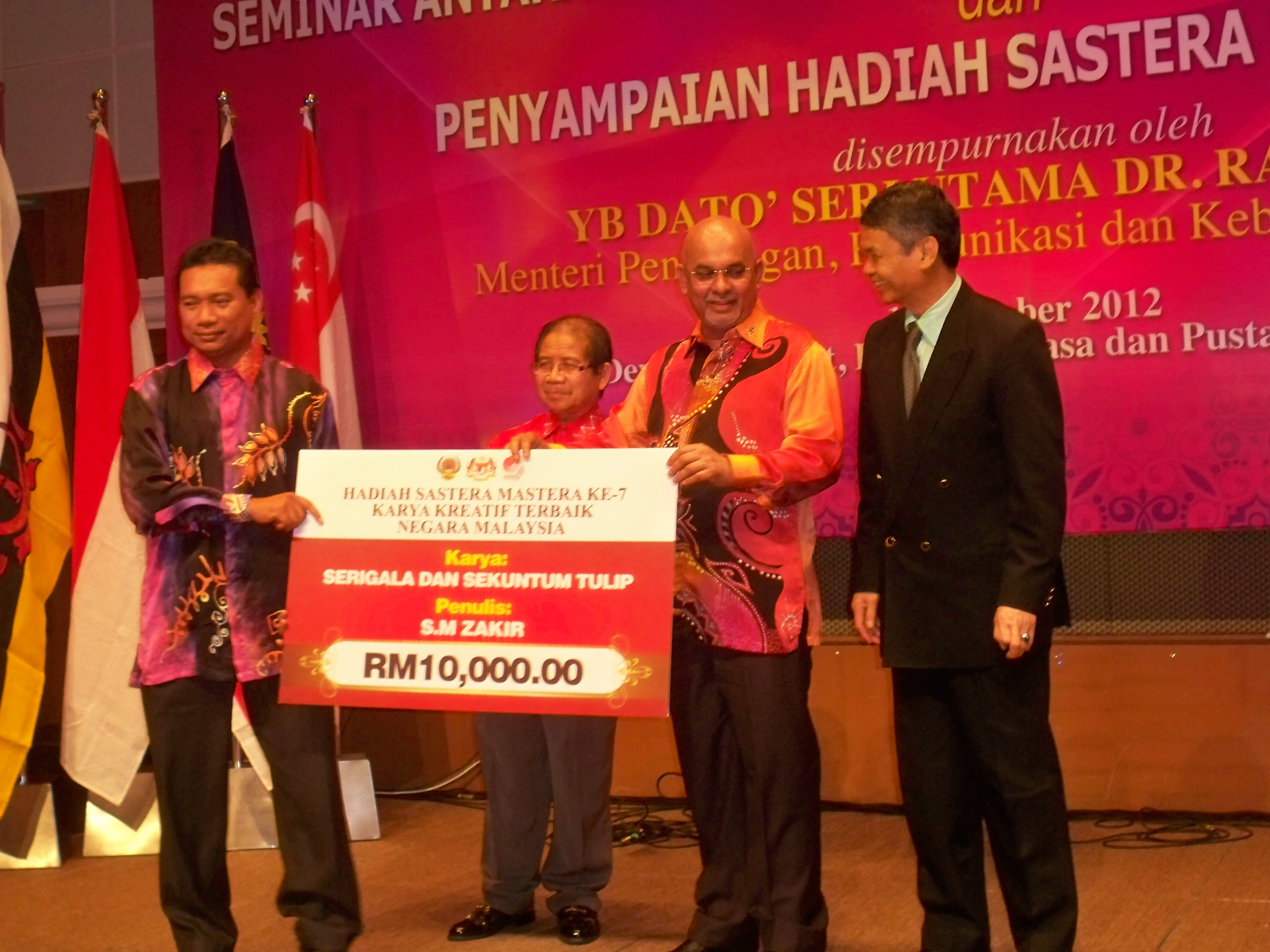
Presentation of the Mastera Award to the Malaysian writer S.M. Zakir (standing on the left) October 17, 2012

Mastera Literary Award is a regional prize awarded since 1999 for the best prose and poetic works, as well as for literary criticism in Malay of the writers of the South-East Asian countries. The founder of the award is the Southeast Asian Literature Council (Malay: Majlis Sastera Asia Tenggara), abbreviated as Mastera.

The Council was established in 1995. Founding countries: Brunei, Indonesia, Malaysia. In 2012, it was joined by Singapore which previously had observer status, and in 2014 by Thailand. Representatives of Viet Nam and Philippines where there are minorities who speak Malay languages periodically participate in the activity of the Council.

Prizes are awarded every two years for works published during the two previous years. Winners receive diplomas and a bonus of 10,000 Malaysian ringgit.

== Mastera Literary Award Recipients ==
=== Mastera Literary Award Recipients (1999) ===
Mastera Literary Award Recipients 1999
| Recipient | Country | Title | Genre |
|---|---|---|---|
| Dr. Sohaimi Abdul Aziz | Malaysia | Rasa - Fenomenologi: Penerapan Terhadap Karya A. Samad Said | Kajian sastera |
| Titis Basino P.I | Indonesia | Dari Lembah ke Coolibah, Welas Asih Merengkuh Tajali, Menyucikan Perselingkuhan | Novel |
| Badaruddin H.O | Brunei | Episod-Episod Si Awang | Kumpulan Puisi |

=== Mastera Literary Award Recipients (2001) ===
Mastera Literary Award 2001
| Recipient | Country | Title | Genre |
|---|---|---|---|
| Muhammad Haji Salleh | Malaysia | Puitika Sastera Melayu | Kajian sastera |
| Kuntowijoyo | Indonesia | Mantra Pejinak Ular | Novel |
| Muslim Burmat | Brunei | Urih Pesisir | Novel |

=== Mastera Literary Award Recipients (2003) ===
Mastera Literary Award 2003: Karya Kreatif
| Recipient | Country | Title | Genre |
|---|---|---|---|
| Anwar Ridhwan | Malaysia | Naratif Ogonshoto | Kumpulan Cerpen |
| Abrar Yusra | Indonesia | Tanah Ombak | Novel |
| Zefri Ariff Brunei | Brunei | Rapat | Kumpulan Drama Pentas |

Mastera Literary Award 2003: Karya Bukan Kreatif
| Recipient | Country | Title | Genre |
|---|---|---|---|
| Abdul Hadi W.M | Indonesia | Tasawuf Yang Tertindas: Kajian Hermeneutik atas Karya-Karyanya | Kajian sastera |

=== Mastera Literary Award Recipients(2005) ===
Mastera Literary Award 2005: Karya Kreatif
| Recipient | Country | Title | Genre |
|---|---|---|---|
| T. Alias Talib | Malaysia | Pasar Pengalaman | Kumpulan Puisi |
| A. Mustofa Bisri | Indonesia | Lukisan Kaligrafi | Kumpulan Cerpen |
| Yahya M.S. | Brunei | Nyanyian Perjalanan Mencari Diri dari Muara ke Arafat | Kumpulan Puisi |

Mastera Literary Award 2005: Karya Bukan Kreatif
| Recipient | Country | Title | Genre |
|---|---|---|---|
| Jelani Harun | Malaysia | Pemikiran Adab Ketatanegaraan Kesultanan Melayu | Kajian sastera |

=== Mastera Literary Award Recipients (2007) ===
Mastera Literary Award 2007: Karya Kreatif
| Recipient | Country | Title | Genre |
|---|---|---|---|
| Azizi Haji Abdullah | Malaysia | Sangeetha | Novel |
| Raudal Tanjung Banua | Indonesia | Gugusan Mata Ibu | Kumpulan Puisi |
| Muslim Burmat | Brunei | Ntaidu | Novel |

Mastera Literary Award 2007: Karya Bukan Kreatif
| Recipient | Country | Title | Genre |
|---|---|---|---|
| Maman S. Mahayana | Indonesia | 9 Jawaban Sastra Indonesia Sebuah Orientasi Kritik | Kajian sastera |

=== Mastera Literary Award Recipients (2010) ===
Mastera Literary Award 2010: Karya Kreatif
| Recipient | Country | Title | Genre |
|---|---|---|---|
| Shahnon Ahmad | Malaysia | Mahabbah | Novel |
| D. Zawawi Imron | Indonesia | Kelenjar Laut | Kumpulan Puisi |
| Haji Mohd Salleh Abdul Latif | Brunei | Tawaduk Musim Sujud | Novel |

Mastera Literary Award 2010: Karya Bukan Kreatif
| Recipient | Country | Title | Genre |
|---|---|---|---|
| - | - | - | - |

=== Mastera Literary Award Recipients (2012) ===
Mastera Literary Award 2012: Karya Kreatif
| Recipient | Country | Title | Genre |
|---|---|---|---|
| S.M. Zakir | Malaysia | Serigala dan Sekuntum Tulip | Kumpulan Cerpen |
| Agus R. Sarjono | Indonesia | Lumbung Perjumpaan | Kumpulan Puisi |
| D.P. Matussin | Brunei | Biarkan Kami Bernafas | Novel |

Mastera Literary Award 2012: Karya Bukan Kreatif
| Recipient | Country | Title | Genre |
|---|---|---|---|
| Noriah Taslim | Malaysia | Lisan dan Tulisan Teks dan Budaya | Kajian sastera |

=== Mastera Literary Award Recipients (2016) ===
Mastera Literary Award 2016: Karya Kreatif
| Recipient | Country | Title | Genre |
|---|---|---|---|
| Malim Ghozali PK | Malaysia | Langit Tidak Berbintang di Ulu Slim | Kumpulan Cerpen |
| Jamal D. Rahman | Indonesia | Rubaiyat Matahari | Kumpulan Puisi |
| Norsiah Gapar | Brunei | Gerun | Novel |
| Johar Buang | Singapura | Pasar Diri | Kumpulan Puisi |

Mastera Literary Award 2016: Karya Bukan Kreatif
| Recipient | Country | Title | Genre |
|---|---|---|---|
| Dr. Mohamad Saleeh Rahamad | Malaysia | Oksidentalisme dalam Sastera Melayu Sebelum Merdeka Hingga Era Mahathir Mohamad | Kajian sastera |
| Jamal T. Suryanata | Indonesia | Sastra di Tapal Batas | Kajian sastera |
| Dr. Hajah Rayah Ali | Brunei | Syair Kenangan Karya Muda Omar ‘Ali Saifuddein: Satu Analisis | Kajian sastera |
| Dr. Azhar Ibrahim Alwee | Singapura | Cendekiawan Melayu Penyuluh Emansipasi | Kajian sastera |

=== Mastera Literary Award Recipients (2021) ===
Mastera Literary Award 2021: Karya Kreatif
| Recipient | Country | Title | Genre |
|---|---|---|---|
| Muzaf Ahmad | Malaysia | Sepasang Sayap di Bahu | Kumpulan Puisi |
| Junaedi Setiyono | Indonesia | Dasamuka | Novel |
| Yahya M.S. | Brunei | Surat-surat Kemerdekaan dari Brunei | Kumpulan Puisi |
| Maarof Salleh | Singapura | Bara | Kumpulan Cerpen |

Mastera Literary Award 2021: Karya Bukan Kreatif
| Recipient | Country | Title | Genre |
|---|---|---|---|
| Rahimah A. Hamid | Malaysia | Proses Kreatif: Sensitiviti dan Kreativiti Pengarang | Kajian sastera |
| Abdul Wachid B.S. | Indonesia | Sastra Pencerahan | Kajian sastera |
| Yahya M.S. | Brunei | Gagasan Ketatanegaraan dalam Syair Almarhum Sultan Haji Omar Ali Saifuddien | Kajian sastera |
| Kartini Anwar | Singapura | Pemikiran dan Gaya Mengarang Raja Ali Haji | Kajian sastera |
