= Jonathan Wade =

American football player (born 1984)

No. 20, 24, 26, 32, 29
- Position: Cornerback

Personal information
- Born: March 27, 1984 (age 42); Shreveport, Louisiana, U.S.
- Listed height: 5 ft 11 in (1.80 m)
- Listed weight: 198 lb (90 kg)

Career information
- High school: Evangel Christian Academy (Shreveport)
- College: Tennessee
- NFL draft: 2007: 3rd round, 84th overall pick

Career history
- St. Louis Rams (2007–2009); Detroit Lions (2010); Cincinnati Bengals (2010); Miami Dolphins (2011); Sacramento Mountain Lions (2012)

Awards and highlights
- Second-team All-SEC (2006)

Career NFL statistics
- Total tackles: 119
- Fumble recoveries: 1
- Pass deflections: 12
- Interceptions: 2
- Stats at Pro Football Reference

Jonathan Charles Wade (born March 27, 1984) is an American former professional football player who was a cornerback in the National Football League (NFL) for five seasons. He played college football for the Tennessee Volunteers. Wade was selected by the St. Louis Rams in the third round of the 2007 NFL draft, and he also played for the Detroit Lions, Cincinnati Bengals, and Miami Dolphins of the NFL.

== Early life ==
Wade was born in Shreveport, Louisiana. He attended Evangel Christian Academy in Shreveport, and played for the Evangel Eagles high school football team. His Eagles teams won three state titles and a 1999 national championship during his time there. Jonathan also holds 3 records in the state of Louisiana.

== College career ==
Wade attended the University of Tennessee, and played for the Tennessee Volunteers football team from 2002 to 2006. He was a standout in both track and football. Wade played wide receiver when first coming to Tennessee but moved to cornerback after sitting out most of the 2003 with an injury redshirt. Wade came under fire by fans early in his career, but many NFL pundits now consider him to be a solid NFL prospect. During the 2006 Season, Wade led the Vols in pass deflections and was second in interceptions. Wade also was named Second-team All- SEC by the league's coaches and the AP.

=== Track and field ===
Also a star track athlete, Wade won the gold medal over the 200 meters, with a time of 20.95 seconds, and the bronze medal over 100 meters at 2001 World Youth Championships in Athletics. He also won the 2001 and 2002 state titles in the 100 meters and 200 meters. He set the state records in both, 200 meters twice, with a time of 21.03 seconds as a junior and broke his own record as a senior (20.58 seconds). Broke the Louisiana indoor 55 meters record (6.22 seconds). He was also the Louisiana 2001 and 2002 Gatorade Track and Field Athlete of the Year.

Wade has also received honors for track and field while he was at the University of Tennessee. He was named All-American in 2005 for both indoor and outdoor track. Wade also anchored Tennessee's 2003 SEC champion and NCAA outdoor runner-up 4 x 100 metres relay team.

His personal bests are 6.67 seconds in the 60 meters, 10.15 seconds in the 100 meters and 20.58 seconds in the 200 meters.

Personal bests

Event	Time (seconds)	Venue	Date
60 meters	6.67	Fayetteville, Florida	February 26, 2005
100 meters	10.21	Baton Rouge, Louisiana	May 4, 2002
100 meters	10.15	hand timed, Louisiana	2002 or earlier
200 meters	20.58	Baton Rouge, Louisiana	May 4, 2002

== Professional career ==
Pre-draft measurables
Height	Weight	40-yard dash	10-yard split	20-yard split	20-yard shuttle	Three-cone drill	Vertical jump	Broad jump	Bench press
5 ft 10 in (1.78 m)	195 lb (88 kg)	4.36 s	1.53 s	2.50 s	4.40 s	7.07 s	40.5 in (1.03 m)	10 ft 6 in (3.20 m)	8 reps
All values from NFL Combine.

=== St. Louis Rams ===
Jonathon Wade was selected in the third round with the 84th pick overall in the 2007 NFL draft by the St. Louis Rams. Wade signed a three-year deal. Over the course of his rookie season at cornerback, Wade played 16 games and made one start as a nickleback and made 24 total tackles, 23 of those solo, with 1 interception returned for 2 yards. On special teams, he returned 1 ball and that was for 19 yards. In 2008 Wade again played 16 games with one start (starting right cornerback Fakhir Brown was injured and Wade started the final game) and ended the year with 10 tackles, one interception and three passes deflected. In the 2009 season, he had 20 total tackles and three passes defended in 15 games.

=== Detroit Lions ===
Wade signed with the Detroit Lions on March 8, 2010. He was cut on November 9, 2010, to make room for Dave Rayner who was signed to replace Jason Hanson.

=== Cincinnati Bengals ===
Wade signed with the Cincinnati Bengals on November 22, 2010, to replace free safety Chris Crocker after he suffered a season-ending knee injury in the Week 11 game against the Buffalo Bills. He was released on September 3, 2011.

=== Miami Dolphins ===
The Miami Dolphins signed him on November 1, 2011. He was waived on November 19. Wade was re-signed to a future contract on January 30, 2012. The Dolphins released him during the preseason on August 25, 2012.
