= James Mortimer (hurdler) =

New Zealand hurdler (born 1983)

Personal information
- Born: 1 March 1983 (age 43) Auckland, New Zealand
- Height: 188 cm (6 ft 2 in)

James Mortimer (born 1 March 1983) is a New Zealand hurdler. He competed at the 2006 Commonwealth Games, where he was a member of the New Zealand 4 × 100 m relay team. He is the national record holder over the 100m hurdles.

== Personal bests ==
Distance	Time	Place	Date
100 m hurdles	13.71 NR	Brisbane	2007
100 m	10.51	Gold Coast	2006
