= Yahya Ibrahim =

Bruneian poet and politician (1939–2022)

Yang Dimuliakan Pehin Siraja Khatib Dato Paduka Seri Setia Yahya Ibrahim PSSUB PHBS PBLI PKL
- يحي إبراهيم
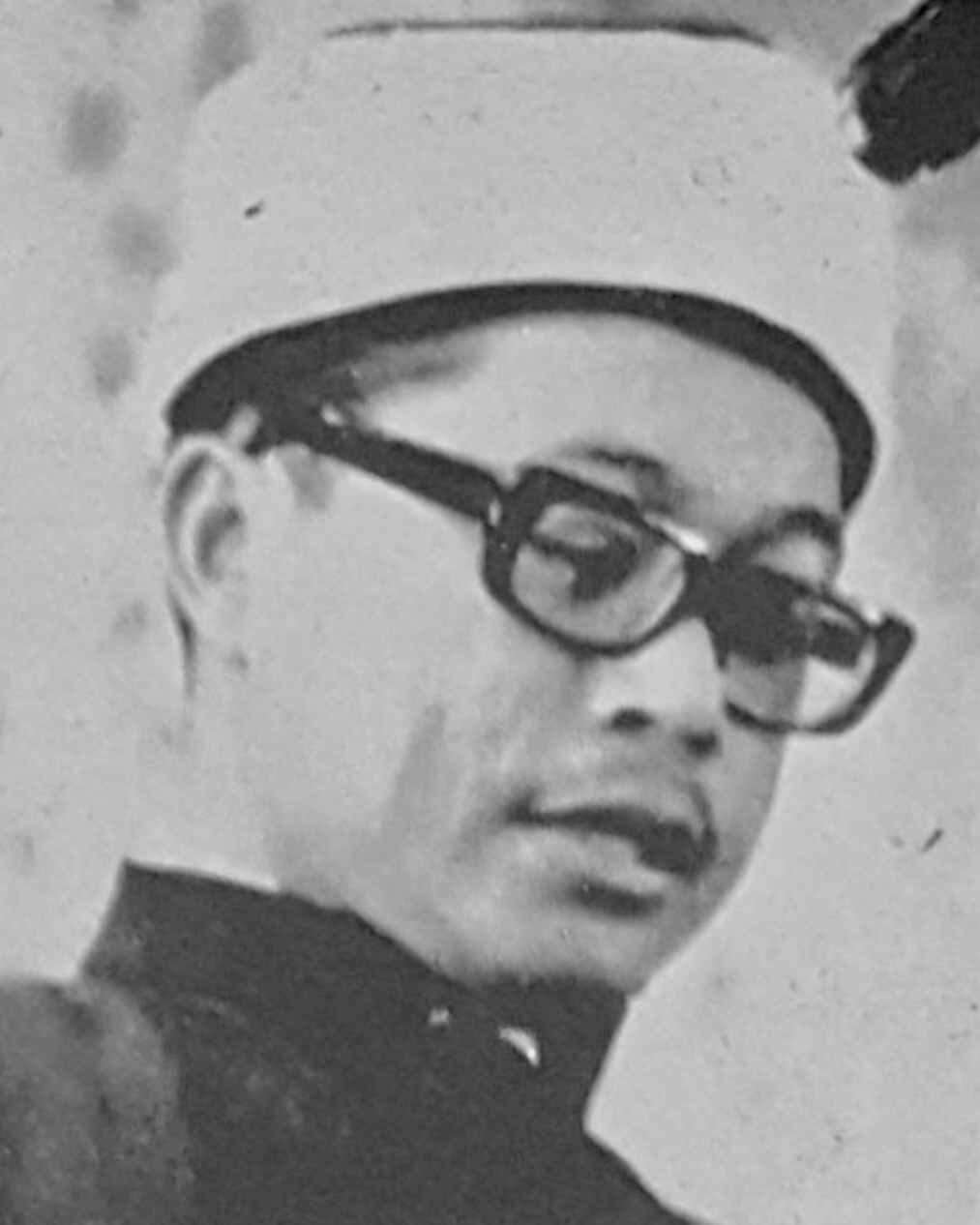
- Yahya in 1971

1st Deputy Minister of Religious Affairs
- In office 20 October 1986 – 25 May 2005
- Monarch: Hassanal Bolkiah
- Minister: Zain Serudin
- Preceded by: Office established
- Succeeded by: Badaruddin Othman

Personal details
- Born: 21 August 1939 Kampong Lurong Sikuna, Kampong Ayer, Brunei
- Died: 2022 (aged 82)
- Spouse: Maimunah Ambak
- Education: Madrasah Aljunied Al-Islamiah; Kolej Islam Malaya; Al-Azhar University (MA)
- Occupation: Syariah judge; poet; politician
- Awards: S.E.A. Write Award; Mastera Literary Award

Yahya bin Haji Ibrahim (21 August 1939 – 2022), also known by his pen name Yahya M.S., Bruneian aristocrat, Syariah judge, poet, and politician. He served as the deputy minister of religious affairs from 1986 to 2005 and held several key positions in the Bruneian government throughout his career. Notably, he was the first vice president of the Brunei Islamic Religious Council (MUIB) until 1975 and also a member of the Privy Council.

== Early life and education ==
Yahya bin Haji Ibrahim was born on 21 August 1939 in Kampong Lurong Sikuna, a village within Kampong Ayer. His educational journey began in 1955, when he attended the Madrasah Aljunied Al-Islamiah in Singapore, where he studied until 1958. He then continued his education at Kolej Islam Malaya in Klang, Selangor, from 1958 to 1963. Yahya furthered his studies at Al-Azhar University in Cairo from 1965 to 1967, where he earned a Master of Arts in Arab studies.

== Career ==
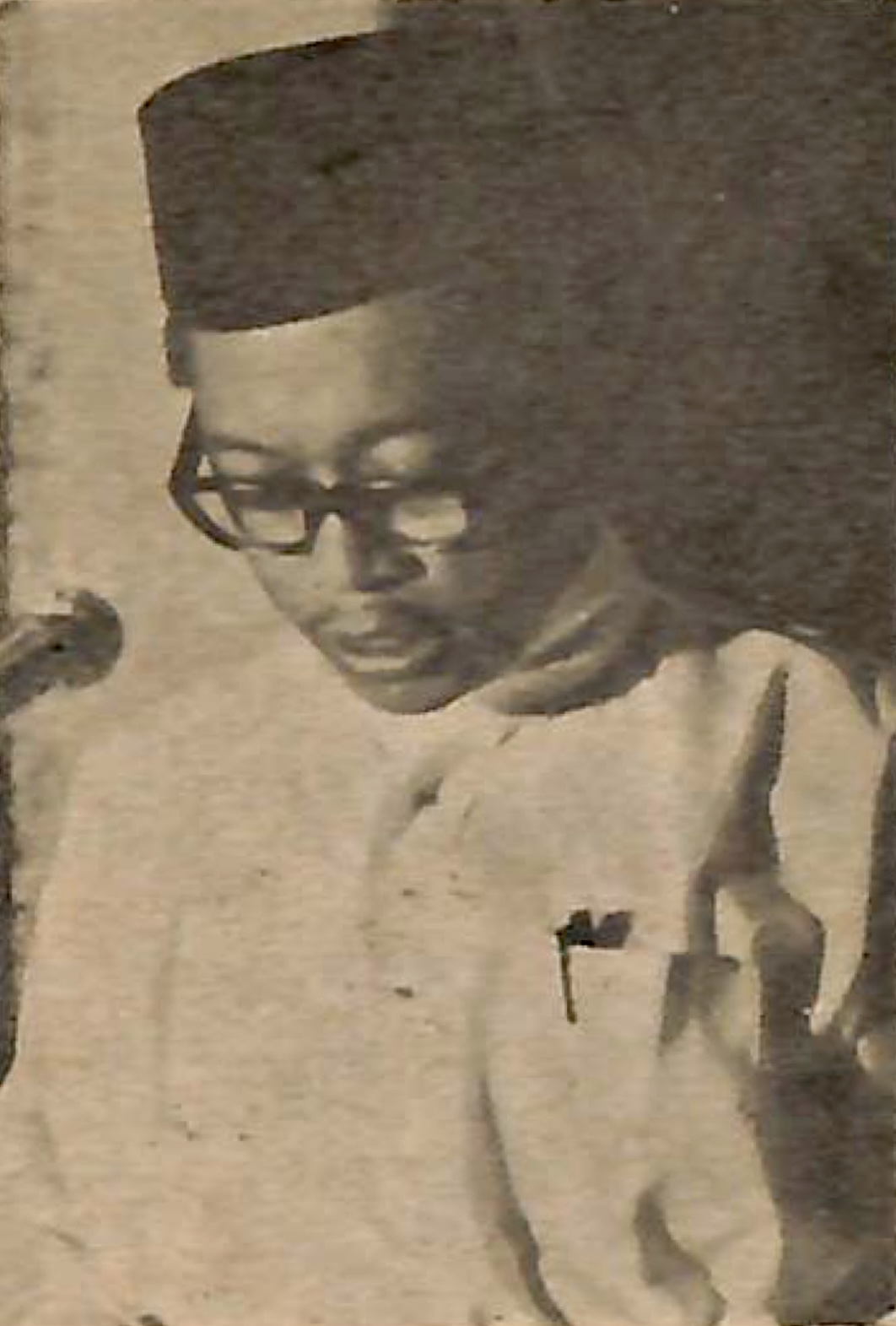
Yahya, c. 1969

In the mid-1970s, Yahya, along with Zain Serudin and Amin Abdul Rahim, played a pivotal role in updating Brunei's religious primary school curriculum and textbooks. His contributions, particularly through the writing of Kaedah Belajar Al-Quran, significantly improved religious education. This reform was necessary due to the previous long and fragmented curriculum, which had led to high failure rates among students. Yahya served as the first vice president of MUIB until 1975 and was also a member of the Privy Council until 1984.

Following the death of his father, Sultan Hassanal Bolkiah announced a cabinet reshuffle on 20 October 1986 via Radio Television Brunei. The reshuffle created thirteen ministerial positions, with Yahya appointed as the deputy minister of religious affairs. Despite these changes, the sultan assured that government policies would remain consistent.

In 2003, Yahya highlighted the significant benefits of religious elementary schools, which were established in 1956 and continued until 1983. He emphasised that these schools played a crucial role in fostering a strong sense of religious consciousness among the population, integrating religious education into daily life. This approach helped cultivate a community where Muslims were mindful of the principles outlined by their faith. Notably, religious education also had a positive impact on women, contributing to a notable increase in the number of female religious officers, including graduates from Al-Azhar University.

Yahya underscored the key focus of the 2011 International Seminar on Islamic Law, which stressed the application of Syariah law in accordance with the sultan’s directives. He discussed the challenges of reconciling Islamic law with contemporary legal systems and emphasised the importance of public involvement in ensuring the correct implementation of Syariah law. The seminar aimed to enhance the legitimacy of the Syariah Court and strengthen the enforcement of Syariah law.

As the chief syar'ie judge, Yahya also highlighted the shortage of syar'ie lawyers in Brunei, noting that only 17 lawyers renewed their licenses in 2011. This figure was deemed "very small" compared to the 1,961 Syariah cases, including 359 criminal cases, registered in 2012. He anticipated an increase in cases following the introduction of the Syariah Penal Code in April 2014, stressing the urgent need for more qualified Syariah lawyers.

The evolution of Syariah law was covered by Yahya in his article "Perkembangan Undang-Undang Syariah hingga 2013: Satu Tinjauan Ringkas." He highlighted the government's attempts to bolster Syariah law, which had lost some of its authority since the British Resident administration was established in 1906. The expansion of the Syariah Court's jurisdiction in 1998 marked the culmination of the 1983 start of the attempts to strengthen Syariah law. The Syariah Penal Code came into effect in 2013. Yahya stressed that in addition to fulfilling religious duties, Syariah law upheld the Melayu Islam Beraja philosophy as the foundational ideal for Bruneians.

On 9 April 2015, Yahya was reappointed by the sultan as a member of the Privy Council, which advises the sultan on important matters such as succession, regency proclamations, constitutional amendments, nominations for Malay customary titles, and the exercise of mercy. On 5 September 2015, a retirement ceremony was held in his honour at the Brunei High Court and Syariah Courts Building, where various legal professionals and government officials gathered to celebrate his service as the former chief Syariah judge. The event featured a syair performance, the recitation of Surah Al-Faatihah, and the presentation of a token of appreciation to Yahya for his years of dedication.

== Later life and death ==
After the conclusion of his ministerial career, Yahya was appointed by the sultan as a member of the MUIB on 24 August 2017 for a three-year term, from 1 August 2017 to 31 July 2020, in line with Chapter 13 of the Majlis Ugama Islam and Kadi Courts Act, Chapter 77. On 25 August 2018, during the launch of the book Politik Kesultanan Brunei 1804-1906: Mengharung Badai Rahmat di Pantai, Yahya, as the president of the Brunei History Association, highlighted the importance of history in helping individuals understand their heritage and identity. He noted that the book serves not only as a reference but also as a crucial resource for students and scholars seeking to understand the nation's history from a local perspective. Additionally, on 30 October 2018, Yahya made a donation of B$1,180.00 to the Sulawesi Humanitarian Fund.

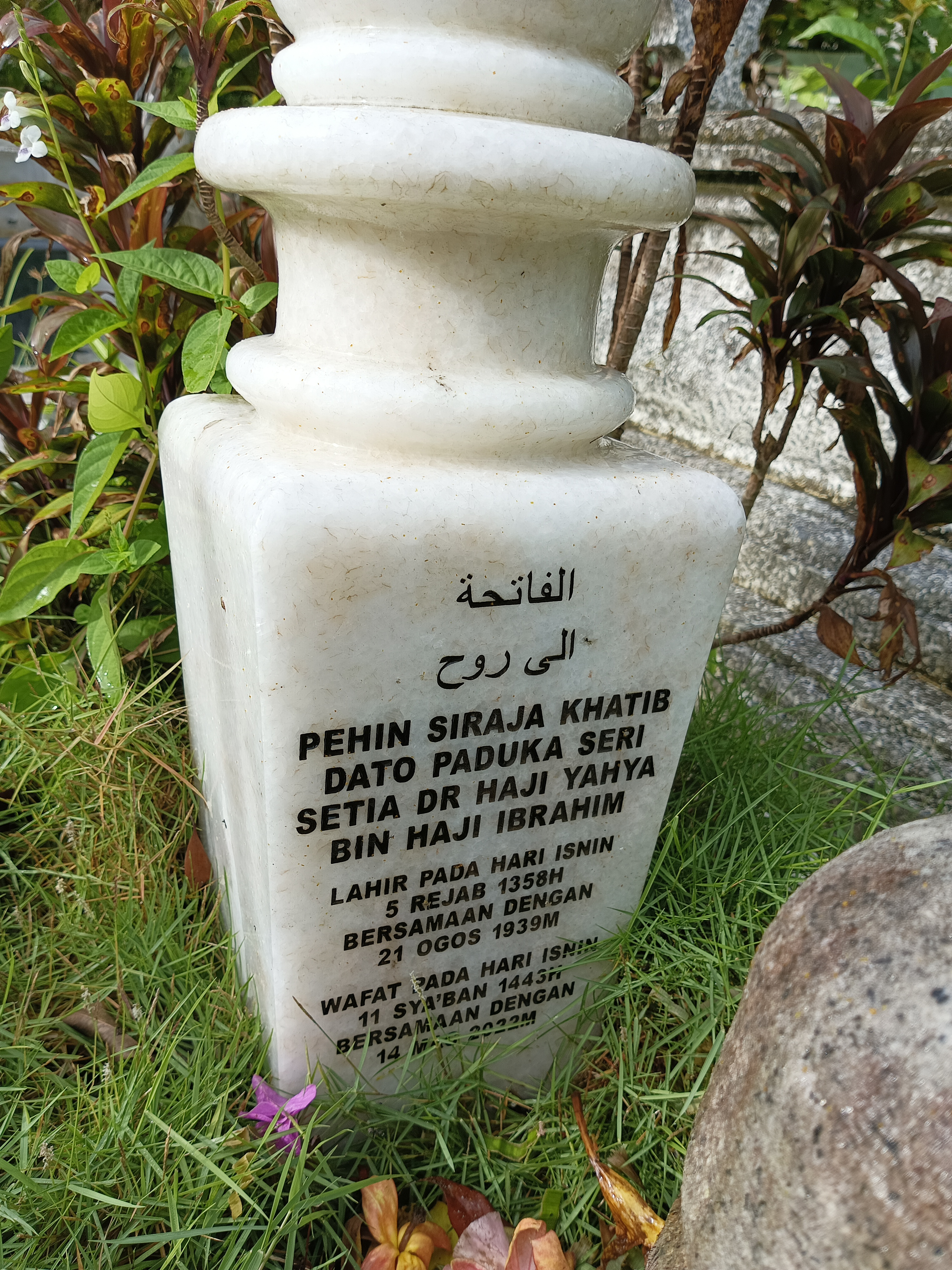
Grave of Yahya Ibrahim at Pulaie Muslim Cemetery

Yahya died in 2022. On 15 June 2022, the Language and Literature Bureau, in collaboration with the Ministry of Culture, Youth and Sports, organised the third edition of the Multaqa Anugerah Sastera Mastera: Memoir Muslim Burmat. During this event, Yahya was posthumously honoured for his contributions to literature and his impact on the local writing community.

== Literacy career ==
=== Themes ===
Yahya's literary themes are rooted in identity, patriotism, and cultural heritage, as demonstrated by his extensive collection of poetry, which he authored under various pseudonyms such as Yahya M.S., Maya Borneo, Madah Satria, Yusra Hariry, and Ani Seroja. His works frequently explore Brunei's historical experiences during the British and Japanese occupations, emphasising the resilience and spirit of the nation as it progressed towards independence. Through his use of the Bruneian dialect, Yahya conveys the essence of local identity and values, offering a cultural perspective. His poetry serves not only as a means of preserving Brunei's heritage but also as a source of inspiration, fostering a sense of national pride and belonging.

=== Selected works ===
Yahya has authored several books, with some of his selected works including:

- Asas-Asas Kritik Sastera. Bandar Seri Begawan: Dewan Bahasa dan Pustaka Brunei. 1983.
- Pehin-pehin manteri ugama sebagai "institusi" dan peranan mereka dalam pentadbiran dan pemerintahan negara di Brunei. 1989.
- Menghayati Sastera Islam Abad Ke-21. Bandar Seri Begawan: Dewan Bahasa dan Pustaka Brunei. 1998. ISBN 9789991700892.
- Sejarah dan Peranan Institusi-Institusi Melayu Islam Beraja. Bandar Seri Begawan: Pusat Da'wah Islamiah. 2000. ISBN 9789991735177.
- Bibliografi karya penulis Brunei. Bandar Seri Begawan: Dewan Bahasa dan Pustaka Brunei. 2002. ISBN 9789991702551.
- Perjalanan Terakhir Anakku Yang Hilang. Gadong: Jabatan Kesusasteraan Melayu. 2003. ISBN 9789991711188.
- Gagasan ketatanegaraan dalam syair-syair Al-Marhum Sultan Haji Omar Ali Saifuddien Sa'adul Khairi Waddeien, Brunei. Kuala Lumpur: Akademi Pengajian Melayu. 2011.
- Gagasan Ketatanegaraan Dalam Syair Almarhum Sultan Haji Omar 'Ali Saifuddien. Bandar Seri Begawan: Dewan Bahasa dan Pustaka Brunei. 2019. ISBN 9789991768823.

== Personal life ==
Yahya was fluent in Malay, Arabic, and English. He was married to Datin Hajah Maimunah binti Ambak, and together they have three known children: a son, Haji Md. Yusruddin, who works as an executive officer in the Syariah department of the TAIB Corporation; two daughters, Hajah Siti Mahyana, a senior religious officer in the Islamic Syiar Development Division, and Hajah Intan Khairani, the headmaster of the ISB Religious School. The family resides at No. 9, Simpang 208, Kampong Manggis 2, Jalan Madang, Bandar Seri Begawan.

== Titles, styles and honours ==
=== Titles and styles ===
On 26 March 1983, Yahya was honoured by Sultan Hassanal Bolkiah with the manteri title of Pehin Tuan Imam. He was later elevated to the title of Pehin Siraja Khatib on 6 November 1984. Both of these esteemed titles are accompanied by the style Yang Dimuliakan.

=== Awards ===
Yahya has been given the following awards:

- S.E.A Write Award (1987)
- Mastera Literary Award (2005; 2021)
- Anugerah Kesusasteraan Islam (2008)
- 9th Hadiah Sastera Mastera (8 October 2021)

=== Honours ===
Yahya has been bestowed the following honours:

- Order of Islam Brunei First Class (PSSUB) – Dato Paduka Seri Setia
- Order of Islam Brunei Second Class (DSSUB; 15 July 1982) – Dato Seri Setia
- Order of Islam Brunei Third Class (SSUB)
- Sultan Hassanal Bolkiah Medal First Class (PHBS; 15 July 2010)
- Pingat Bakti Laila Ikhlas (PBLI)
- Long Service Medal (PKL)

Political offices
Preceded by Office established	1st Deputy Minister of Religious Affairs; 20 October 1986 – 25 May 2005	Succeeded by Badaruddin Othman
