= Adam Miller (sprinter) =

Australian sprinter

Adam Miller (born 22 June 1984 in Sydney) is an Australian sprinter who competed at the Athens Olympics, 2006 Commonwealth Games and the 2007 IAAF World Championships. He retired from running in 2008.
