= 2006 Bangkok International Film Festival =

Edition of film festival

Poster for the 2006 Bangkok International Film Festival

The 2006 Bangkok International Film Festival was held from February 17 to February 27. The festival's events were held in the newly opened Siam Paragon, the first time all the festival's screenings, sidebar events, activities and film market were gathered under one roof.

The festival opened with the Asian premiere of Pen-Ek Ratanaruang's Invisible Waves. The closing film was Rent by Chris Columbus.

Celebrity highlights included director Terry Gilliam giving a master class, actor Christopher Lee giving a talk and introducing a screening of The Man with the Golden Gun, as well as appearances by Catherine Deneuve, Willem Dafoe, Tadanobu Asano, Rita Moreno, Rufus Sewell, director Oliver Stone and cinematographer Christopher Doyle.

== Golden Kinnaree Awards ==
=== International Competition ===
==== Best Picture ====
- Water, directed by Deepa Mehta
  - The Consequences of Love, directed by Paolo Sorrentino
  - The House of Sand, directed by Andrucha Waddington
  - Invisible Waves, directed by Pen-Ek Ratanaruang
  - Istanbul Tales, directed by Umit Unal, Kudret Sabanci, Elim Demirdelen, Yucel Yolcu and Omur Atay
  - Mrs Henderson Presents, directed by Stephen Frears
  - Ringfinger, directed by Diane Bertrand
  - River Queen, directed by Vincent Ward
  - Sympathy for Lady Vengeance by Park Chan-wook
  - Transamerica, directed by Duncan Tucker
  - Tsotsi, directed by Gavin Hood
  - The White Masai, directed by Hermine Huntgeburth

==== Best Director ====
- Park Chan-Wook, Sympathy for Lady Vengeance

==== Best Actor ====
- Presley Chweneyagae, Tsotsi

==== Best Actress ====
- Felicity Huffman, Transamerica

=== Best ASEAN Film ===
- Bride of Silence, directed by Đoàn Minh Phượng and Doàn Thanh Nghia
  - 3 Friends, directed by Mingmongkol Sonakul, Pumin Chinaradee and Aditya Assarat
  - Ahimsa: Stop to Run, directed by Kittikorn Laiwsirikun
  - The Burnt Theater, directed by Rithy Panh
  - Gie, directed by Riri Riza
  - Goalposts & Lipsticks, directed by Bernard Chauly
  - The Gravel Road, directed by Deepak Kumaran Menon
  - Janji Joni, directed by Joko Anwar
  - Journey from the Fall, directed by Ham Tran
  - Magdalena: The Unholy Saint, directed by Laurice Guillen
  - The Masseur, directed by Brillante Mendoza
  - Monday Morning Glory, directed by Woo Ming Jin
  - The Tin Mine, directed by Jira Maligool
  - Unarmed Combat, directed by Han Yew Kwang

=== New Voices ===
- Kept and Dreamless, directed by Vera Fogwill and Martin Desalvo
  - A Common Thread, directed by Eléonore Faucher
  - Dreaming Lhasa, directed by Ritu Sarin and Tenzing Sonam
  - Go West, directed by Ahmed Imamovic
  - The Intruder, directed by Frank Van Mechelen
  - Kissed By Winter, directed by Sara Johnsen
  - The Married Woman, directed by Pradeep Sarkar
  - Milarepa: Revenge, directed by Neten Chokling
  - On My Skin, directed by Valerio Jalongo
  - Parzania, directed by Rahul Dholakia
  - Reaching Silence, directed by Jahar Kanungo
  - Ryna, directed by Ruxandra Zenide
  - The Sacred Family, directed by Sebastián Campos Watt
  - Season of the Horse, directed by Ning Cai
  - Sophie Scholl – The Final Days, directed by Marc Rothemund
  - Stoned!, directed by Steven Woolley
  - Three Dots, directed by Roya Sadat

=== Best Documentary ===
- Rize, directed by David LaChapelle
- Honorable mention - Ballets Russes, directed by Dayna Goldfine and Dan Geller
- Honorable mention - In the Shadow of the Palms, directed by Wayne Coles-Janess
  - Africa United, directed by Ólaf Jóhannesson
  - Before the Flood, directed by Li Yifan and Yan Yu
  - Crossing the Bridge: The Sound of Istanbul, directed by Fatih Akın
  - Linda & Ali, Two Worlds Within Four Walls, directed by Lut Vandekeybus
  - Nice Hat! 5 Enigmas in the Life of Cambodia, directed by David Brisbin
  - Switch Off (Apaga y vámonos), directed by Manel Mayol
  - The Art of Flight, directed by Davin Anders Hutchins
  - The Giant Buddhas, directed by Christian Frei
  - The Stories from the North, directed by Uruphong Raksasad
  - Vajra Sky Over Tibet, directed by John Bush

=== Special awards ===
- Jameson Best Asian Short Film – Under Construction, directed by Lee Hyung-Suk
- Jameson People's Choice Award – Art of the Devil 2, directed by Kongkiat Khomsiri, Art Thamthrakul, Yosapong Polsap, Putipong Saisikaew, Isara Nadee, Pasith Buranajan and Seree Pongniti
- Jury Mention – Istanbul Tales, directed by Umit Unal, Kudret Sabanci, Elim Demirdelen, Yucel Yolcu and Omur Atay
- Award for Outstanding Contribution to the Promotion of Asian Cinema – Wouter Barendrecht and Michael J. Werner of Fortissimo Films.
- Crystal Lens Award – Anthony Dod Mantle
- Career Achievement Award – Catherine Deneuve
- Lifetime Achievement Award – Sombat Metanee

== Controversy ==
Ahead of the 2006 festival, Somsak Techaratanaprasert, the president of the Federation of National Film Associations of Thailand, called for a boycott of the festival by group members, because festival organizers, the Tourism Authority of Thailand, had not included Federation in the film-selection process and marketing plans for the festival, as it had in past years. Member film studios Five Star Production, GTH and RS Promotion did not agree with the boycott, which led to Somsak, also the chief executive of Sahamongkol Film International, to resign as chairman of the Federation. But as a result of the boycott, some films produced or distributed by Sahamongkol were pulled from the festival program.
