= Anocha Suwichakornpong =

Thai film director

- อโนชา สุวิชากรพงศ์
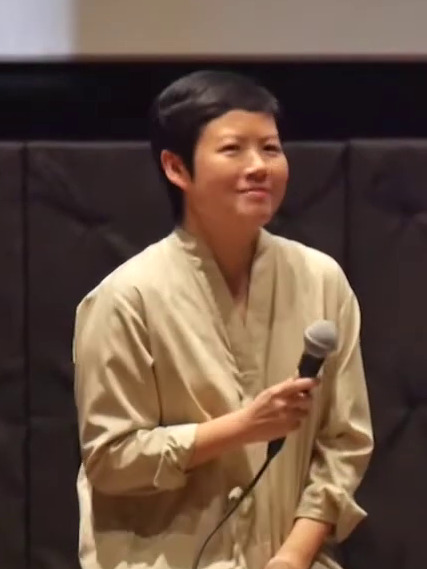
- Anocha Suwichakornpong in 2020
- Born: February 24, 1976 (age 50); Chonburi, Thailand
- Other name: Mai
- Education: University of Warwick; Columbia University (MFA)
- Occupations: Film director; screenwriter; producer
- Years active: 2006 - present
- Organization(s): Purin Pictures, Electric Eel Films
- Notable work: By the Time It Gets Dark; Mundane History
- Children: 1
- Awards: Prince Claus Award
- Website: http://electriceelfilms.com https://www.purinpictures.org

Anocha Suwichakornpong (Thai: อโนชา สุวิชากรพงศ์, born 1976) is a Thai independent film director, screenwriter and producer. She is currently Professor of Film at Columbia University, where she advises thesis students in the MFA Film Program and teaches film directing. She was formerly Visiting Lecturer on Art, Film, and Visual Studies at Harvard University.

She has directed four feature films and over a dozen shorts films. Her films include Come Here (2021); By the Time It Gets Dark (2016); and Mundane History (2010).

Her films have been the subject of retrospectives at the Museum of the Moving Image, New York; TIFF Cinematheque, Toronto; Cinema Moderne, Montreal; and Olhar De Cinema, Brazil, among others. Her work, informed by the socio-political history of Thailand, has received international critical acclaim and numerous awards.

She is the recipient of the 2019 Prince Claus award for:

"Pioneering a mode of intellectual feminist filmmaking, courageously and convincingly challenging hegemonic practices and established conventions, both in filmmaking and in society."

In 2020, she was a recipient of the Silpathorn Award, an honour for living Thai contemporary artists presented annually by the Office of Contemporary Art and Culture, Ministry of Culture of Thailand. In 2024, she was selected for the Creative Capital Award.

As is common in Thai culture, her friends, colleagues and fans often refer to her by her nickname, Mai (maɪ).

She currently resides in Brooklyn, NY and Bangkok.

== Early life ==
Anocha Suwichakornpong was born in Thailand 1976 to second generation Chinese immigrants. She spent her early childhood in Pattaya before moving to England at the age of fourteen. After completing undergraduate studies in London, she received an M.A. from University of Warwick in Arts Education and Cultural Studies. In 2006, she graduated from the MFA film program at Columbia University, where she was a recipient of Hollywood Foreign Press Association Fellowship.

== Career ==
Anocha's thesis film from Columbia University, Graceland (2006), premiered at 59th Cannes Film Festival. It the first Thai short to be selected at Cannes Film Festival. It was also featured at the 2007 Sundance Film Festival and many other festivals. During the production of Graceland, Anocha began working with her long-term collaborators, cinematographer Leung Ming Kai and editor Lee Chatametikool. The same year, she was selected to participate in the Talent Campus at Berlin Film Festival, where her feature-length script was among the 15 projects chosen to take part in the Script Clinic.

She co-founded her production company, Electric Eel Films, in Bangkok in 2006. In 2017, she co-founded Purin Pictures, a film fund that supports independent cinema in Southeast Asia, offering much needed assistance in a region that lacks adequate governmental support.

She is the first filmmaker in Columbia University's MFA Film Program to receive tenure-track since Miloš Forman in 1978.

=== Mundane History (2006) ===
Anocha's debut feature, Mundane History (Jao nok krajok, เจ้านกกระจอก), is a family drama about the friendship that develops between a young, paralyzed man from a wealthy Bangkok family and his male nurse from Isan in the north of Thailand. The film is also a commentary on Thailand's class-based society and the frailty of life. It was screened at several festivals, and won the Tiger Award at the 2010 International Film Festival Rotterdam.

=== By The Time It Gets Dark (2016) ===
In 2010, Anocha was planning her second feature, By the Time It Gets Dark, the script of which won her the Prince Claus Fund Film Grant of €15,000 from the CineMart of the Rotterdam International Film Festival. The film was released in 2016. It won the Thailand National Film Association Awards for Best Picture and Best Director, making her the firsts female director to be awarded. The film was selected as the Thai entry for Best Foreign Language Film at the 90th Academy Awards.

=== Come Here (2021) ===
Premiered at Berlinale Forum 2021.

=== Other works ===
She has directed over a dozen shorts and video installations and is the co-director of Krabi, 2562 (2019) with British artist Ben Rivers.

== Filmography ==
=== Features ===
Year	English Title	Thai Title	Notes
2010	Mundane History	เจ้านกกระจอก	Won Tiger Award at the 2010 International Film Festival Rotterdam
2016	By The Time It Gets Dark	ดาวคะนอง	Won Thailand National Film Association Awards for Best Picture and Best Director
2019	Krabi, 2562	กระบี่, 2562	Co-directed with Ben Rivers
2021	Come Here	ใจจำลอง	Premiered at Berlinale Forum 2021

=== Shorts ===
- 747 (2001, co-dir.)
- Days Like This (2002)
- Full Moon (2003)
- Not a New York Story (2004)
- Ghosts (2005)
- Graceland (2006)
- Jai (2007)
- Like. Real. Love (ดุจ จิต ใจ) (2008)
- Black Mirror (2008)
- Lunch (2010)
- Overseas (2012, co-dir.)
- Thursday (2015)
- Coconut (2015)
- Nightfall (2016, co-dir.)
- The Ambassadors (2018, co-dir.)
