= Huyou skits =

Chinese word often referring to bragging

Huyou skits (Chinese: 忽悠小品; pinyin: Hūyou xiǎopǐn) are skits by the actor Zhao Benshan featuring his swindler character Da Huyou (Chinese: 大忽悠).

Huyou is a Chinese word often used by speakers of the Chinese language to refer to bragging. It comes from Northeastern Mandarin, which originally meant to shake, to flatter, or to be muddle-headed. The word became popular in China since Zhao Benshan, Fan Wei and Gao Xiumin's skit the in 2001 CCTV New Year's Gala. The sketch was such a success that huyou has become a popular word in China with the new meaning of swindling.

== Skits ==
The actor Zhao Benshan created the swindler character Da Huyou (Chinese: 大忽悠). In Northeastern Mandarin, the nickname means "good at bluffing and blustering". Da Huyou made his debut in the sketch "Selling Crutches" (simplified Chinese: 卖拐; traditional Chinese: 賣拐) at the 2001 CCTV New Year's Gala. The skit stars Zhao, Fan Wei, and Gao Xiumin. Zhao's Da Huyou laments the wasted effort put into making crutches for sale to an injured neighbor after the hospital provides the neighbor with a wheelchair. Wagering with his wife that he can find a buyer for the crutches, Da Huyou convinces the easily fooled Chef Fan, played by Fan, to put himself in a condition where he has to rely on crutches. By the end of the sketch, Da Huyou has swindled Chef Fan out of his bicycle and every yuan he is carrying. The sketch was a hit with the audience, turning Zhao into "the king of comedy". It inspired the word huyou, a rarely expression in Northeastern Mandarin, to enter Mandarin slang to signify tricking or deceiving people. Da Huyou and Chef Fan appeared in subsequent New Year's Galas with the comedic setups on Chef Fan growing increasingly intricate year by year. In the sketch Selling a Wheelchair (simplified Chinese: 卖車; traditional Chinese: 賣車) 2002 CCTV New Year's Gala, Da Huyou persuaded Chef Fan that he was dependent on a wheelchair because he suffered from a psychological disorder. In the 2005 television program, the wheelchair was replaced with a stretcher.

== Analysis ==
Alex Colville of The China Project compared the Da Huyou character to the schemer Del Boy in the British sitcom Only Fools and Horses. Scholars denounced the crudeness of the get-rich-quick skits, saying they send harmful messages. Xiao Ying, a professor at Tsinghua University, said, "They either treat cheating or being cheated as ridiculous ... so much so that people have lost the direction of moral judgement in the satisfaction of stimulating their senses." Yet other academics thought the skits were an example of the "black earth culture (Chinese: 黑土文化) that struck a chord with everyday audiences. The Iowa State University professor Aili Mu believed that Chinese viewers could have seen huyou as "an overkill of the market mentality". Audiences frequently ranked the Da Huyou sketches at the top of gala polls.

Prior to being featured in the sketches, only the Northern Mandarin dialect employed the term huyou. The word had three meanings: to shake, to flatter, and to be muddle-headed. The most frequently used meaning was "to shake". After Zhao's skit "Selling a Crutch" fused the meanings of flattery and muddled thinking to give the word a fresh meaning of deception.

== Bibliography ==
- Mu, Aili (July 2004). "Two of Zhao Benshan's Comic Skits: Their Critical Implications in Contemporary China" (PDF). Concentric: Literary and Cultural Studies. Vol. 30, no. 2. National Taiwan Normal University. pp. 3–34. Archived from the original (PDF) on 2025-06-28.
