= When the Road Bends... Tales of a Gypsy Caravan =

2006 documentary film

- Directed by: Jasmine Dellal
- Produced by: Jasmine Dellal; Sara P. Nolan
- Production company: Little Dust Productions
- Release date: 2006
- Country: United States
- Language: English

When the Road Bends... Tales of a Gypsy Caravan is a 2006 documentary film directed by Jasmine Dellal about Gypsy musicians in the United States.

== Content ==
The film follows Gypsy musicians in five bands on concert tour across the United States. The film includes live performances, backstage scenes, scenes with the musicians' families in India, Spain, Macedonia and Romania, and interviews. Musician, Esma Redžepova appear. It includes an interview of Johnny Depp. Also includes appearances from:

- Taraf de Haïdouks
- Esma Redžepova
- Fanfare Ciocărlia
- Maharaja (including Queen Harish)
- Antonio El Pipa Flemenco Ensemble featuring cantaora Juana la del Pipa "who is related to the Parrilla guitar-playing family and both the Zambo and Terremoto singing clans."
- Johnny Depp
- George Eli

== Production ==
It was directed by Jasmine Dellal, co-produced by Dellal and Sara P. Nolan. It was executive produced by San Fu Maltha, Wouter Barendrecht, and Michael J. Werner. The company that produced it was Little Dust Productions in association with ITVS, Fu Works Filmrights and Fortissimo Films. It was filmed by Albert Maysles, Alain de Halleux, and Dellal.

== Release ==
It was released in North America in 2006. It was released on 2007 in the United Kingdom.

== Reception ==
According to Rotten Tomatoes the critic consensus was "A dynamic doc following five Romani bands is a pleasure for the senses thanks to vibrant colors and eclectic music".
