= Graceland (2006 film) =

- Directed by: Anocha Suwichakornpong
- Written by: Anocha Suwichakornpong
- Produced by: Soros Sukhum; Jetnipith Teerakulchanyut
- Cinematography: Leung Ming Kai
- Edited by: Lee Chatametikool
- Music by: Jettamon Malayota
- Release date: 2006
- Running time: 17 minutes
- Country: Thailand
- Language: Thai

Graceland is a short film directed by Anocha Suwichakornpong in 2006. The film follows an Elvis impersonator who travels from Bangkok into the countryside with a mysterious stranger. It premiered at 59th Cannes Film Festival. It was the first Thai short film to be officially selected by Cannes Film Festival.

The film is a collaboration between director Anocha Suwichakornpong and her longtime cinematographer and film-school classmate Leung Ming Kai. It was shot on 35mm in rural Thailand.

The film was partly inspired by The Wizard of Oz. It was Anocha Suwichakornpong's thesis film for her MFA at Columbia University. She was inspired to make the film after receiving advice from her screenwriting professor, Milena Jelinek, who advised her that “It’s not the character’s action that drives the story, but the character’s dream."

Since its premier at Cannes in 2006, the film has screened at various institutions and festivals, such as the multidisciplinary festival and exhibition, Other Futures. It was included in the monthly Staff Picks series at e-flux in 2021.
