= Wisut Ponnimit =

Thai animator

- Born: Wisut Ponnimit; August 15, 1976 (age 50) Bangkok, Thailand
- Area: Cartoonist
- Notable works: Him Her That (English translation); hesheit; Mamuang; Blanco

Wisut Ponnimit (Thai: วิศุทธิ์ พรนิมิตร; August 15, 1976, Bangkok), sometimes known by the nickname Tum or Tam (Thai: ตั้ม), is a Thai cartoonist, animator, illustrator, and musician. He is best known for creating the cartoon character Mamuang who has attained significant popularity in Thailand and Japan as well as hesheit, an ongoing series of short comic stories. Started in 1998, hesheit is one of the first alternative Thai comics and one of the only Thai comic series partly translated into English and Japanese. During a two-year study trip in Japan from 2003 to 2005, Wisut Ponnimit started working as a manga artist for Japanese publishing companies such as Shinchosha and Shogakukan. His manga series Blanco (Japanese: ブランコ) was published in the Japanese magazine Ikki Comics (Shogakukan) between 2007 and 2010. He has also contributed regularly to the alternative Thai comics anthologies MUD published by Typhoon Books from 2008 to 2011. In 2013, an English book of Ponnimit's translated as Him Her That gained critical acclaim, and Time Out Tokyo called it "the English manga book you simply have to buy." Aside from his comics career, Wisut Ponnimit also creates short animation movies and their soundtracks, sometimes for television commercials. He is also the drummer of the band named Penguin Villa.

In 2023 Ponnimit was accused of sexual intimidation, for which he apologised. The news was a national scandal. The incident happened two years prior, but the victim did not dare to talk about it because of the fame the artist has. Ponnimit apologised without an excuse, as he stated himself.

== Profile ==
Wisut Ponnimit began drawing since he was in grade 7. As a child, he was influenced by manga such Dragon Ball by Akira Toriyama and Captain Tsubasa by Yōichi Takahashi and later by manga artist such as Takehiko Inoue, Mitsuru Adachi, Osamu Tezuka and Rumiko Takahashi. He also mentions the animated cartoons Mickey Mouse, Pink Panther and Doraemon as being important encounters influencing the foundation of his art with little dialogue. While in college in 1998, he sent some of his comic stories to the newly founded alternative manga magazine BeboydCg which started publishing his comics series hesheit. He obtained a degree in interior design from the Faculty of Decorative Arts, Silpakorn University. After graduating, he kept working as a cartoonist in Thailand but, due to a lack of inspiration, he decided to go to Japan. He left Thailand in 2004 and headed to Japan, where he studied the Japanese language and lived in a new environment to find ideas and writing inspiration. Earning a place in the 2005 Yokohama Triennale, he caught the attention of Japanese manga publishers and signed contracts with Shinchosha and Shogakukan. Most of his works have been first published in Japan and then translated into Thai for the Thai market. His manga Everybodyeverything, serialized in the Japanese Magazine 5 in 2005, was the first comic book of a Thai cartoonist published initially in Japan (in Magazine 5) and introduced the famous character Mamuang whose merchandise is substantial. He has also been named by Elle magazine Japan as one of the world's 250 most interesting people to watch and was awarded the Encouragement Prize/New Face Award, Manga Division, at the 13th Japan Media Arts Festival in 2009 for his manga hesheit aqua (Japanese: ヒーシーイット―アクア). His manga series Blanco (Japanese: ブランコ) was published in the Japanese magazine Ikki Comics (Shogakukan) between 2007 and 2010. He has also contributed regularly to the alternative Thai comics anthology MUD published by Typhoon Books from 2008 to 2011. A collection of hesheit short stories was translated into English by Awai Books under the title Him Her That. Wisut Ponnimit currently shares his life between Thailand and Japan.

== Style ==
Wisut Ponnimit's comic book series hesheit, incorporating untidy, childlike drawing styles and unstructured, little or no dialogue, is considered as exemplary of the alternative style of Thai cartooning. His genre-dynamiting manga blur the borders between art and literature while offering humor, warmth, and philosophical accessibility. His writing style originated from his own perception about the world and himself. His comic stories depict how he sees things in his life and around. “It is like telling a story about someone; it could be my mom or my friend” said Wisut Ponnimit.

== Mamuang ==
Mamuang is a famous character who made her first appearance in the comic book "Everybodyeverything". The little girl is named Mamuang, which means mango (Thai: มะม่วง) in Thai, in relation to her hair, whose shape evokes the form of the stone fruit. The character became well known in Thailand through a series of Line application stickers. Millions of people downloaded a Mamuang sticker because of its cuteness.

== Work ==
- hesheit, 1998-ongoing, 12 volumes, serialized in Katch and a day Thai magazines, first published by BeboydCg then Typhoon Books and now a book
- Smoke Under the Hat (Thai: ควันใต้หมวก), 2003, published by day after day Co. Ltd. then by Typhoon Books. Japanese edition in 2007.
- Everybodyeverything, 2005, first comic book of a Thai cartoonist published initially in Japan (in Magazine 5) and published afterwards in Thai (by Typhoon Books in 2005). Introducing the famous character Mamuang
- Tam-khun and Japan (Japanese: タムくんとイープン, Thai: ตั้มกับญี่ปุ่น), 2006, published in Japan by Shinchosha and afterwards in Thailand by Typhoon Books
- Blanco (Japanese: ブランコ, Thai: ชิงช้า), 6 volumes, 2008-2010, serialized in the Japanese magazine Ikki Comics, published in Japan by Shongakukan and afterwards in threes volumes in Thailand by a book (2011-2012)
- hesheit aqua (Japanese: ヒーシーイット―アクア, 2009, Nanarokusha, translation into Japanese of stories previously published in Thailand. Awarded the Encouragement Prize, Manga Division, 13th Japan Media Arts Festival in 2009.
- Romance (Japanese: ロマンス - タムくんのラブストーリー短編集, Thai: โรมานซ์), 2010, first published in Japan by Ohta Publishing and afterwards in Thailand by Typhoon Books (2011)
- hesheit orange (Japanese: ヒーシーイット オレンジ, 2012, Nanarokusha, translation into Japanese of stories previously published in Thailand
- Mamuang chan (Thai: มะม่วงจัง), 2012, published in Thailand by a book
- Him Her That, 2013, English book translation of hesheit stories, translated by Matthew Chozick, published by Awai Books
- Advertising animation(TVC) for Yamaha
- Icon animation for mobile company "Docomo"
- Paper man (Animation cartoon for Double A company)
- Drummer of "Penguin Villa" (Album called "Go out side)
