= Wentong Tianxia =

Chinese book publishing company

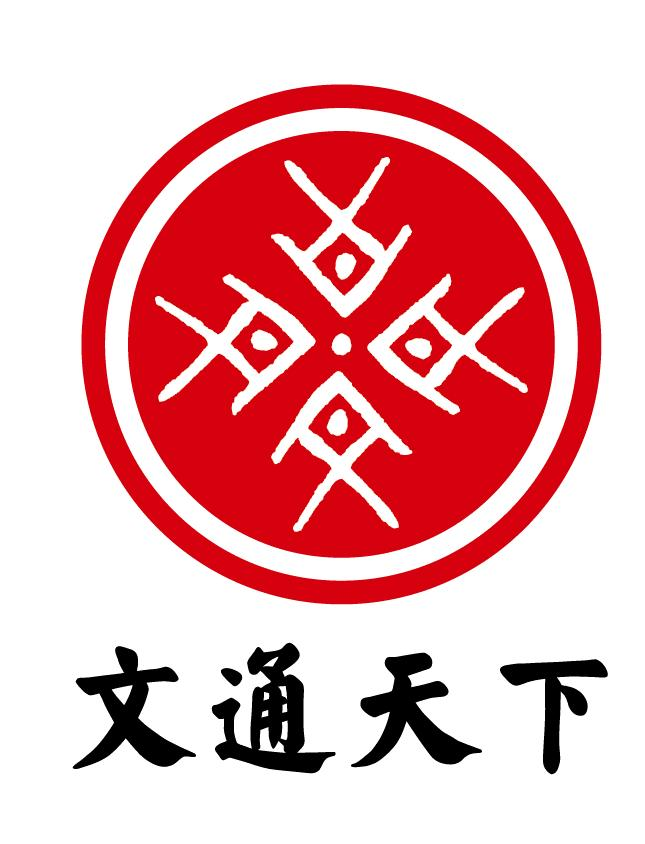

Wentong Tianxia (simplified Chinese: 文通天下) is a Chinese book publishing company which publishes in the fields of fiction, biography, economy, science, psychology and health, as well as children's literature. Its headquarters is in Beijing.

Since its founding in 2006, the company has cooperated with publishers from the Europe, the United States, Japan, Korea, Hong Kong and Taiwan, and gradually dominated the Chinese mass book market, with a circulation of 150,000 copies every year.

== History ==
In 2010, the company published The Ball (simplified Chinese: 球事儿) which was recommended by Zhao Benshan.

In 2011, the company published The biography of Han Han (simplified Chinese: 韩寒), which become a bestseller.

In 2012, the company published Live long (simplified Chinese: 无病到天年), a book by Lu Zhizheng (simplified Chinese: 路志正). Lu is a doctor of heads of state and the government.
