= Michael J. Werner =

American film producer

Michael J. Werner is an American film producer.

He studied Chinese in the 1980s and has had a deep affinity and association with Chinese and Asian film since then.

In the late 1990s he consulted to the international distribution division of 20th Century Fox from his Hong Kong base assisting that company to build distribution arrangements in China and a number of other niche Asian markets. The successful release in China of "Titanic" – which set box office records there – was one of his particular achievements.

Throughout the 1990s he maintained a portfolio of interests that spanned the mainstream fare of Hollywood, both established and emerging talent from Hong Kong and new wave directors from China and other film industries across Asia.

Since 2000, he has been co-chairman of the multi-national film production, sales and distribution company, Fortissimo Films, which was founded in 1991 by Wouter Barendrecht. He has been based in Hong Kong since 1995.

== Filmography ==
Credits as either executive producer or producer

- The Goddess of 1967 (2000)
- Tsui Hark's Vampire Hunters (2002)
- Bear's Kiss (2002)
- Springtime in a Small Town (2002)
- Party Monster (2003)
- 16 Years of Alcohol (2003)
- The Tulse Luper Suitcases, Part 1: The Moab Story (2003)
- Last Life in the Universe (2003)
- The Tulse Luper Suitcases: Antwerp (2003)
- The Tulse Luper Suitcases, Part 3: From Sark to the Finish
- Grimm (2003)
- P.S. (2004)
- Mysterious Skin (2004)
- The Night Listener (2006)
- Invisible Waves (2006)
- When the Road Bends… Tales of a Gypsy Caravan (2006)
- Shortbus (2006)
- Syndromes and a Century (2006)
- I Don't Want to Sleep Alone (2006)
- Waiter (2006)
- Getting Home (2007)
- The Home Song Stories (2007)
- Ploy (2007)
- Pleasure Factory (2007)
- Country Wedding (2008)
- Life During Wartime (2008)
- Black Oasis (2008)
- Suk Suk (2019)
- All Shall Be Well (2024)
