= Porntip =

Porntip or Pornthip (RTGS: Phonthip, pronounced [pʰɔ̄ːn.tʰíp]) is a Thai female given name. The same pronunciation is shared by two different spellings, พรทิพย์ and ภรณ์ทิพย์. พร is from Pali: vara while ภรณ์ is shortened from Sanskrit: ābharaṇa, and ทิพย์ is derived from Sanskrit: divya.

People with the name พรทิพย์ include:

- Porntip Papanai, actress and model
- Pornthip Rojanasunand, doctor and human rights activist
- Porntip Buranaprasertsuk, badminton player

People with the name ภรณ์ทิพย์ include:

- Porntip Nakhirunkanok, also known as Bui Simon, a model who was awarded the title of Miss Universe 1988
