= Nida Patcharaveerapong =

Thai actress (1984–2022)

- ภัทรธิดา (นิดา) พัชรวีระพงษ์
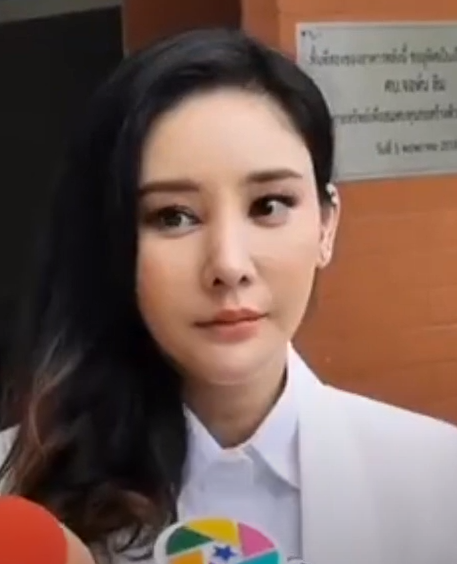
- Nida in 2020
- Born: Tangmo Patcharaveerapong; 13 September 1984; Yan Nawa (now Sathon), Bangkok, Thailand
- Died: 24 February 2022 (aged 37); Mueang Nonthaburi, Nonthaburi, Thailand
- Other name: Tangmo (nickname)
- Education: College of Social Innovation, Rangsit University
- Occupations: Actress; model; singer; MC; racing driver
- Years active: 1998–2022
- Agents: Channel 7 (2002–2013); Freelance (2014–2022)
- Partner(s): Phakin Khamwilaisak (2013–2015); Bird (2020–2022)
- Relatives: Dayos "Toi" Detjob (half-brother)

Signature
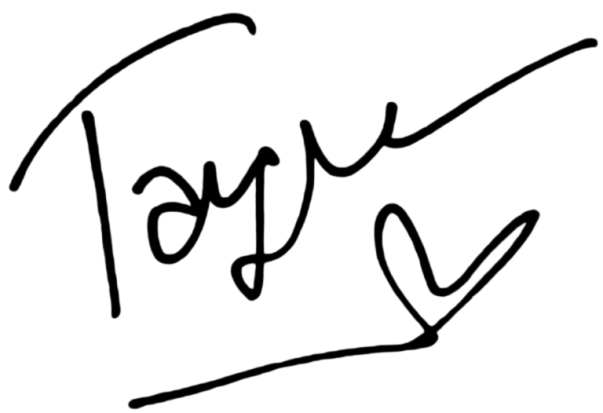

Nida Patcharaveerapong (Thai: นิดา พัชรวีระพงษ์; 13 September 1984 — 24 February 2022), formerly and still colloquially known as Pattaratida Patcharaveerapong (ภัทรธิดา พัชรวีระพงษ์), better known by the nickname Tangmo (แตงโม), was a Thai actress known for her main roles in several Thai dramas. She made her acting debut in 2003.

== Biography ==
=== Early life ===
She was born in Bangkok as Tangmo Patcharaveerapong. Her parents split up when she was five years old, and she has always lived with her father. She has only one sibling, Toi-Dayos, a half-brother.

She made her show business debut when she was a Matthayom 1 grader (7th grade) by filming commercials. Many years later, in 2002, she entered the Miss Teen Thailand Pageant and placed as the fourth runner-up.

Nida was Protestant following Phuket-born Trang father, Sophon Patcharaveerapong. Her mother, Panida Siriyudthayothin, is a former actress from Lopburi who worked in the 1970s.

=== Married life ===
At the end of 2013, she got engaged to a fellow entertainer, Phakin Khamwilaisak. The couple were engaged for approximately two years before breaking up in 2015.

=== Death ===
On the night of 24 February 2022, Tangmo Nida fell from a speedboat into Chao Phraya River. Her body was recovered two days later on 26 February 2022. On 26 April 2022 the Royal Thai Police ruled that no foul play was involved in her death, but pressed charges against six people for "recklessness" and involvement in her death. Her body was cremated on 24 May 2022, at the crematorium in the compound of the Rangsit Methodist Church in Pathum Thani province after the funeral. Her remains were collected by her family members and encased into pendants for loved ones.

== Acting career ==
=== Television series ===
- Say Yom See (2016)
- Wan Ne Te lor koy (2013)
- Se Sa hay Sa buy Dee (2012)
- Sao Noy Roy Lem Kwien (2012)
- Pleng Ruk Baan Nah (2011)
- Jao Ying Lhong Yook (2011)
- Lui (2011)
- Ruk Tae Kae Dai (2009)
- Dum Kum (2009)
- Koo Pbuan Olawon (2008)
- Talard Nam Damnern Ruk 2 (2008)
- Pieng Peun Fah (2007)
- Kasanaka (2007)
- Plaew Fai Nai Fhun (2006)
- Muen Rao Ja Rak Kun Mai Dai (2006)
- Yai Bai Bahm (2006)
- Roong Keang Dao (2005)
- Payak Rai Hua Jai Jiew (2005)
- Oun Ai Ruk (2004)
- Benja Keta Kwarm Rak (2003)
- Prissana (2000)

=== TV dramas ===
- 2000 Prissana (2000) (ปริศนา) (Two In One/Ch.7) as Mon Jao Ying Rattanawadee's friend (เพื่อนหม่อมเจ้าหญิงรัตนาวดี)
- 2001 Petch Tud Petch (2001) (เพชรตัดเพชร) (Dara Video/Ch.7) as Pin (ปิ่น)
- 2003 Benja Keta Kwarm Ruk (เบญจา คีตา ความรัก) (Dara Video/Ch.7) as Fiat (เฟียซ)
- 2004 Oun I Ruk (อุ่นไอรัก) (Dara Video/Ch.7) as Khantima harasuk (Kawao) (กานติมา ธาราสุข (กาเหว่า)) with Siwat Chotchaicharin
- 2005 Pa Yak Rai Hau Jai Jew (พยัคฆ์ร้ายหัวใจจิ๋ว) (Pau Jin Jong/Ch.7) as Saprangfah (สะพรั่งฟ้า) with Danuporn Punnakun
- 2005 Roong Keang Dao (รุ้งเคียงดาว) (Hunkmnoga/Ch.7) as Roong (Rainbow) / Dao (Star) (แสงดาว / พราวรุ้ง (รับบทฝาแฝด)) with Kade Tarntup
- 2006 Yai Bai Bah (ยัยไบบ้า) (Red Drama/Ch.7) as Sabai (สไบ) with Thana Suttikamul
- 2006 Muen Rao Ja Rak Kun Mai Dai (เหมือนเราจะรักกันไม่ได้) (มาสเคอร์ เรด/Ch.7) as Piangor (เพียงออ) with Vee Veraparb Suparbpaiboon
- 2006 Plaew Fai Nai Fhun (2006) (เปลวไฟในฝัน) (Dara Video/Ch.7) as Mali (มะลิ) with Kade Tarntup
- 2007 Kasanka (กาษา นาคา) (Pau Jin Jong/Ch.7) as Winta (Winny) (วินตา (วินนี่))
- 2007 Pieng Peun Fah (เพียงผืนฟ้า) (Dara Video/Ch.7) as (พลอย) with Tle Tawan Jarujinda
- 2008 Talard Nam Damnern Ruk Part 2 (2008) (ตลาดน้ำดำเนินฯ รัก 2) (559 On Air/Ch.7) as with Tle Tawan Jarujinda
- 2008 Koo Pbuan Olawon (คู่ป่วนอลวน) (Dida Video Production/Ch.7) as Pawika (ภาวิกา) with Vee Veraparb Suparbpaiboon
- 2009 Dum Kum (ดำขำ) (Exact-Scenario/Ch.7) as Noodum (กาฬมณี (หนูดำ)) with Pong Nawat Kulrattanarak
- 2011 Lui (ลุย) (Dida Video Production/Ch.7) as Soysiri (สร้อยคีรี) with Vee Veraparb Suparbpaiboon
- 2011 Jao Ying Lhong Yook (เจ้าหญิงหลงยุค) (Mirabilis/Ch.7) as Jao Ying Kannikakesorn (Kannika) (เจ้าหญิงกรรณิกาเกสร (กรรณิการ์)) with Khun Kanin
- 2011 Pleng Ruk Baan Nah (เพลงรักบ้านนา) (Dida Video Production/Ch.7) as SeePlae (ศรีแพร) with Tle Thanapon Nimtaisuk
- 2012 Sao Noy Roy Lem Kwien (สาวน้อยร้อยเล่มเกวียน) (Media Studio/Ch.7) as (วีนัส พิพัฒวัฒนากุล (วี)) with Oun Rangsit
- 2013 Wan Nee Tee Ror Khoi 2013 (วันนี้ที่รอคอย) (Por Dee Kam/Ch.7) as Jao Meu Ing (จ้าวเหม่ยอิง)
- 2013 Nak Soo Maha Gaan (นักสู้มหากาฬ) (Mum Mai/Ch.7) as Natcha (ร.ต.อ.หญิง ณัฐชา) with Sukollawat Kanaros
- 2015 Phloeng Dao (เพลิงดาว) (MONEYPLUS ENTERTAINMENT/PPTVHD36) as Montika Bunprasoet (มณฑิกา บุญประเสริฐ) with Bom Tana Eamniyom
- 2015 Khunying Nok Thamniap (คุณหญิงนอกทำเนียบ) (RS/Ch.8) as Khunying Supatsagee (คุณหญิสุพัตศจี) with Fluke Jira Danbawornkiat
- 2016 Sane Rai Ubai Rak (เสน่ห์ร้ายอุบายรัก) (MONEYPLUS ENTERTAINMENT/PPTVHD36) as Porpiang Porjareinkun (Par) (พอเพียง พอเจริญกุล (แพร)) with Bie Thassapak Hsu
- 2017 Sai Yom Si (ทรายย้อมสี) (RS/Ch.8) as Maneeyong Sangpaiboon (Yong) (มณียง แสงไพบูรณ์ (ยง)) with Fluke Krekpon Mussayawanich, Mark Apiwit Jakthreemongkol, Krit Amornchailerk, Sun Prachakorn Piyasakulkaew, Ball Vittavat Singlumpong
- 2018 Sai Ruk Sai Sawaat 2018 (สายรักสายสวาท) (The One Enterprise/One 31) as Fongkae (ฟองแข อินต๊ะ / ฟองแข วรากร ณ อยุธยา / ฟองแข ณ เวียงสรวง) with Fluke Krekpon Mussayawanich & Captain Phutanate Hongmanop
- 2019 Bai Mai Tee Plid Plew (ใบไม้ที่ปลิดปลิว) (The One Enterprise-CHANGE2561/One 31) as Rungrong (Nira's aunt) (รังรอง สิริวัฒน์ (รอง)) with Puttichai Kasetsin
- 2019 Leh Runjuan (เล่ห์รัญจวน) (Aplus Production/Ch.8) as Bulan (บุหลัน) with Nike Nitidon Pomsuwan
- 2020 Nuer Nai (เนื้อใน) (CHANGE2561/GMM 25) as Kanya (Kan) (กัญญา (กัญ))

=== TV series ===
- 2004 (รวมพลคนก้นบาตร) (Pau Jin Jong/Ch.7) as Tang Kwa (แตงกวา) with เจษฎา รุ่งสาคร
- 2006 (ยายหนูลูกพ่อ) (Dara Video-DIDA Video-Samsearn/Ch.7) as Ampila (อัมพิลา) with Atsadawut Luengsuntorn
- 2013 Saai Yai (สายใย) (/Ch.7) as Namo with Arnus Rapanich
- 2016 Club Friday The Series 7: Ruk Tong Leuk (Club Friday the series 7 เหตุ..เกิดจากความรัก ตอน รักต้องเลือก) (A-TIME MEDIA/GMM 25) as Aem with Boy Pidsanu Nimsakul
- 2016 The Extra (วงการร้าย วงการรัก) (GREATEST ENTERTAINMENT/Channel 9) as Pat (ภัทร)
- 2017 (Guiding Light ก้าวตามรอยพ่อ ตอน นางฟ้าเดินดิน) (GREATEST ENTERTAINMENT/Channel 9) as Dr.Jieb (หมอเจี๊ยบ)
- 2017 Under Her Nose (พ่อบ้านใจกล้าสตอรี่) (The Pipal Tree/Workpoint TV) as Cris (คริส) (EP.03)
- 2018 Mueng Maya Live The Series Part 4: Maya Ruk On Lie (เมืองมายา Live ตอน มายารัก On Lie) (The One Enterprise/One 31) as Dao Dara (ดารา บูรณะสวัสดิ์ (ดาว)) with Shahkrit Yamnam
- 2018 It's Complicated 2018 (เพราะรักมันซับซ้อน) (Bearcave Studio/LINE TV) as Jue (จือ) with Aon Sarawut Martthong
- 2018 Club Friday the Series 10 (Club Friday the Series 10 รักนอกใจ ตอน รักที่ไม่อยากเลือก) (CHANGE2561/GMM 25) as Tong (ตอง)
- 2018 Bangkok Love Stories 2 Mai Diang Sa (Bangkok รัก Stories 2 ตอน ไม่เดียงสา) (GMM Bravo/GMM 25) as Clo-Dia (คลอเดีย)

=== The drama that used to be set ===
- 2022 Krasue Lam Sing (กระสือลำซิ่ง) (Cheer Up/Ch.8) as (not accepting (ไม่รับเล่น))
- 2022 Sisa Marn (2022) (ศีรษะมาร) (RS/Ch.8) as Pilantha Wichianpatt (Pee') / Preeya (ปิลันธา วิเชียรภัทธ (ปี๋) / ปรียา) (not accepting (ไม่รับเล่น))
- 2022 To Sir, With Love (2022) - Khun Chai (2022) (คุณชาย) (The One Enterprise/One 31) as (คุณจันทร์ (อาจันทร์) / ซ้อรอง) (sudden death The production team has given Panward Hemmanee to play this role instead. (เสียชีวิตอย่างกะทันหัน ทางทีมงานสร้างจึงได้ให้ปานวาดรับบทนี้แทน))

=== TV sitcoms ===
- 2008 Happy Library (ห้องสมุดสุดหรรษา) (/Ch.7) as Fun (ฝุ่น) with Au Panu Suwanno
- 2009 Ruk Tae Kae Dai (รักแท้แก้ได้) (/Ch.7) as Ok Choie (อบเชย) with Tle Thanapon Nimtaisuk
- 2010 Peaw Tarad Taek (เปรี้ยวตลาดแตก) (TV Thunder/Ch.7) as (เปรี้ยว) with Kade Tarntup
- 2010 (หมู่ 7 เด็ดสะระตี่) (TV Thunder/Ch.7) as Mok (หมอก)
- 2012 (สี่สหายสบายดี) (559 On Air/Ch.7) as Ploysouy (พลอยสวย) with Anuwat Choocherdratana

=== Movies ===
- 2003 Ghost of Mae Nak (นาค รักแท้ วิญญาณ ความตาย) (Box Office Entertainment) as Nak (นาค) with Siwat Chotchaicharin
- 2010 (ปรุงหัวใจใส่คนอร์รสทิพ) () as ()
- 2016 (ป๊าด 888 แรงทะลุนรก) () as ()
- 2018 (เลิฟเดอะเทอทีน) () as ()
- 2018 The Last Heroes (ตุ๊ดตุ่กู้ชาติ) (M Pictures) as 2nd consort of Burmese King
- 2021 (หอแต๋วแตกแหกโควิด ปังปุริเย่) () as ()

=== Ost. ===
- Dramas : Benja Keta Kwarm Ruk (เบญจา คีตา ความรัก)
  - Songs : (ดนตรีในหัวใจ - นักแสดงร้องทั้งหมด)
  - Songs : (ไม่ว่าง - ร้องร่วมกับ หนูอิมอิม ก้าวมหัศาจรรย์, ทรายขวัญ หาญหนองบัว)
- Dramas : Pa Yak Rai Hau Jai Jew (พยัคร้ายหัวใจจิ๋ว)
  - Songs : (คนที่รออยู่)
- Dramas : Kasanaka (กาษานาคา)
  - Songs : (ไถ่รักแท้ด้วยศรัทธา)
- Dramas : Jao Ying Lhong Yook (เจ้าหญิงหลงยุค)
  - Songs : (รักเธอไปทุกยุค)
- Dramas : Nak Soo Maha Gaan (นักสู้มหากาฬ)
  - Songs : Jark Kon Koey Glai (จากคนเคยใกล้)
- Dramas : Sao Noy Roy Lem Kwien (สาวน้อยร้อยเล่มเกวียน)
  - Songs : Jark Nee Pai Jon Ni Run (จากนี้ไปจนนิรันดร์) On Air YouTube:GMM GRAMMY OFFICIAL
- Dramas : Sane Rai Ubai Rak (เสน่ห์ร้ายอุบายรัก)
  - Songs : (สองความรู้สึกในหัวใจเดียวกัน)
- Dramas : Sai Yom Si (ทรายย้อมสี)
  - Songs : Plueak (เปลือก) On Air YouTube:rsfriends

=== Music videos ===
- 2003 Prou Ter Pen Kon Dee (เพราะเธอเป็นคนดี) - Baby Bull (RS/YouTube:rsfriends) with ธัชพล ชุมดวง (ตูน AF 3)
- 2009 (รู้หว่าว) - กันย์ (อำพล เตาลานนท์) (RS/YouTube:พระนครฟิลม์ Phranakornfilm)
- 2010 (เหมือนตาย...ทั้งที่ใกล้กัน) - Thanapond Wagprayoon (RS/YouTube:rsfriends) with Somchai Kemglad
- 2011 Chiwit Khu (ชีวิตคู่) - Thanapond Wagprayoon (RS/YouTube:rsfriends) with Somchai Kemglad
- 2011 (ตัวถ่วง) - Nexus (/YouTube:imusicThailand) with Nutt Dechapanya
- 2012 รั้ง (Runk) - Phunkorn Boonyachinda (Revol Music Creation/YouTube:Revol Music Creation) with Nawat Kulrattanarak
- 2016 (กลับตัวกลับใจ) - Dax Rock Rider (Me Records/YouTube:ME RECORDS)
- 2017 (ฉันมันแค่แฟนเก่า (Ex Soul)) - Tah Mint Dodge Go - TMDG (ต๊ะ มิ้นท์ ด็อจ โก้ - TMDG) (B-Mix) (DemoLab/YouTube:DEMOLAB)

=== MC ===
- 2016: คอหนังข้างถนน On Air GMM 25 (ก็อตซิป กัน (GossipGun), Pongsatorn Jongwilas, Rusameekae Fagerlund, Thanakorn Phowijit) (2016–2018)
