= Lee Chatametikool =

Thai film editor and sound editor

- ลี ชาตะเมธีกุล
- Education: Hampshire College
- Occupations: Film editor; sound editor
- Years active: 2002–present

Lee Chatametikool (Thai: ลี ชาตะเมธีกุล) is a Thai film editor and sound editor. He is a frequent collaborator with Apichatpong Weerasethakul and other Thai independent directors, but has also worked on commercial films, including the hit Thai horror film, Shutter.

Lee studied filmmaking in the United States. He has been active since 1999, when he directed a short film, Miami Strips, Hollywood Dreams (Muang maya, krung tida). The film was the runner-up winner of the Rattana Pestonji Award for Best Thai Short Film at the 2000 Thai Short Film and Video Festival.

He has worked with Apichatpong Weerasethakul on five films: Blissfully Yours, Tropical Malady, Syndromes and a Century, Uncle Boonmee Who Can Recall His Past Lives and Memoria. At the inaugural Asian Film Awards in 2007 in Hong Kong, Lee won the Best Editor award for Syndromes and a Century.

In 2002, Lee founded his own post-production company, Houdini Studio.

== Filmography ==
=== As director ===
- Miami Strips, Hollywood Dreams (Muang maya, krung tida, 1999)
- Concrete Clouds, ภวังค์รัก (2013)

=== As film editor ===
- Blissfully Yours (2002)
- One Night Husband (2003)
- Sayew (2003)
- Fake (2003)
- Tropical Malady (2004)
- Shutter (2004)
- Midnight My Love (2005)
- Ghost of Mae Nak (2005, contributing)
- The Elephant King (2006)
- Graceland (2006)
- Syndromes and a Century (2006)
- The Sperm (2007)
- Wonderful Town (2007)
- Love of Siam (2007)
- Block B (2008)
- A Moment in June (2009)
- Karaoke (2009)
- Mundane History (2009)
- Uncle Boonmee Who Can Recall His Past Lives (2010)
- Hellgate (2011)
- Home (2012)
- Cemetery of Splendour (2015)
- Apprentice (2016)
- Pop Aye (2017)
- Malila: The Farewell Flower (2017)
- Manta Ray (2018)
- So Long, My Son (2019)
- The Cave (2019)
- Taste (2021)
- Vengeance Is Mine, All Others Pay Cash (2021)
- Yuni (2021)
- Memoria (2021)
- All Dirt Roads Taste of Salt (2023)
- Jenjira's Magnificent Dream (2026)

=== As sound editor ===
- Blissfully Yours (2002)
- One Night Husband (2003)
- Sayew (2003)
- Tropical Malady (2004)

=== As post-production supervisor ===
- Invisible Waves (2005)
- Twelve Twenty (For Jeonju International Film Festival's Digital Short Films by Three Directors project, 2006)

== Awards and nominations ==
Award	Year	Category	Nominated work	Result	Ref.
Asian Film Awards	2007	Best Editor	Syndromes and a Century	Won	
Asian Film Awards	2010	Best Editor	Karaoke	Won	
Asian Film Awards	2017	Best Editor	Apprentice (shared with Natalie Soh)	Won	
Asian Film Awards	2020	Best Editor	So Long, My Son	Nominated	
Chinese Film Media Awards	2019	Best Film Editing	So Long, My Son	Nominated	
Chicago Film Critics Association Awards	2023	Best Editing	All Dirt Roads Taste of Salt	Nominated	
Chlotrudis Awards	2017	Best Editing	Cemetery of Splendor	Nominated	
Busan International Film Festival	2013	Best Film	Concrete Clouds (ภวังค์รัก)	Nominated	
Edinburg International Film Festival	2014	Best International Feature Film	Concrete Clouds (ภวังค์รัก)	Nominated	
International Film Festival Rotterdam	2014	Tiger Award	Concrete Clouds (ภวังค์รัก)	Nominated	
Shanghai International Film Festival	2014	Asian New Talent Award - Best Film	Concrete Clouds (ภวังค์รัก)	Nominated	
Taipei Film Festival	2014	International New Talent Competition - Grand Prize	Concrete Clouds (ภวังค์รัก)	Nominated	
Vesoul Asian Film Festival	2014	Golden Wheel	Concrete Clouds (ภวังค์รัก)	Nominated	
Suphannahong National Film Awards	2021	Best Editing	Where We Belong (shared with Harin Paesongthai)	Won	
Suphannahong National Film Awards	2021	Best Editing	Manta Ray (กระเบนราหู) (shared with Harin Paesongthai)	Nominated	
Suphannahong National Film Awards	2018	Best Editing	Pop Aye	Nominated	
Suphannahong National Film Awards	2017	Best Editing	By the Time It Gets Dark (ดาวคะนอง)	Won	
Suphannahong National Film Awards	2015	Best Editing	Concrete Clouds (ภวังค์รัก)	Nominated	
Suphannahong National Film Awards	2015	Best Director	Concrete Clouds (ภวังค์รัก)	Won	
Suphannahong National Film Awards	2015	Best Screenplay	Concrete Clouds (ภวังค์รัก)	Nominated	
Suphannahong National Film Awards	2008	Best Editing	Love of Siam (กแห่งสยาม) (shared with Chookiat Sakveerakul)	Nominated	
Maya Awards	2022	Best Editing	Yuni (shared with Cesa David Luckmansyah)	Won	
Maya Awards	2022	Best Editing	Vengeance Is Mine, All Others Pay Cash	Nominated	
QCinema International Film Festival	2019	Best Artistic Achievement	Nakorn-Sawan	Won	
