= Nymph (2009 film) =

2009 film

- Film poster
- Directed by: Pen-Ek Ratanaruang
- Written by: Pen-Ek Ratanaruang
- Produced by: Michael J. Weithorn; Kiatkamon Iamphungporn; Aphiradee Iamphungporn; Wouter Barendrecht; Tipwarin Nildum
- Starring: Jayanama Nopachai
- Cinematography: Charnkit Chamnivikaipong
- Edited by: Patamanadda Yukol
- Music by: Koichi Shimizu
- Distributed by: Five Star Production; Fortissimo Films
- Release date: 1 July 2009
- Running time: 109 minutes
- Country: Thailand
- Language: Thai

Nymph (Thai: นางไม้, translit. Nang mai) is a 2009 Thai drama film directed by Pen-Ek Ratanaruang. It competed in the Un Certain Regard section at the 2009 Cannes Film Festival. The 'nymph' in the story is based on the Thai legendary Nang Mai tree deity.

== Plot ==
May is a city woman who has everything she could ask for. Her long-time husband, Nop, showers love and attention on her. But fate or desire play tricks on the couple who watches their lives drift by without much thought or reflection, and May starts an affair with Korn, himself a married man. One day Nop, a professional photographer, is assigned to take a trip into the forest to film its wildlife. He decides to bring his wife along. But the journey slowly reveals how the invisible weight of their urban lifestyle haunt them like a spectre. When her husband fails to return to the tent, May sets out to look for him and then Nop returns but the forest has changed him into someone else.

== Cast ==
- Jayanama Nopachai as Nop
- Porntip Papanai as Nymph
- Wanida Termthanaporn as May
- Chamanun Wanwinwatsara as Korn

== Analysis ==
The film is Ratanaruang's seventh feature.

A review in The Hollywood Reporter described the filming techniques as follows: "A large proportion of the film is shot with a handheld camera that skillfully simulates the viewpoint and sensory reactions of someone fumbling through the jungle, occasionally varied by some sweeping shots that take in the enormity of the area from above." Both this review and a review at Critikat, although positive, find the film would have gained by seeing its length reduced.

Another commentator finds that the film "makes use of the forest spirits to portray how bad relationships can get".
