= Mundane History =

2009 Thai film

- Film poster
- Thai: เจ้านกกระจอก
- Directed by: Anocha Suwichakornpong
- Written by: Anocha Suwichakornpong
- Produced by: Soros Sokhum; Anocha Suwichakornpong
- Starring: Phakpoom Surapongsanuruk; Arkaney Cherkam; Paramej Noiam; Anchana Ponpitakthepkijo
- Cinematography: Leung Ming Kai
- Edited by: Lee Chatametikool
- Music by: Furniture (Malaysian band); The Photo Sticker Machine (Thai band)
- Production company: Electric Eel Films
- Distributed by: Survivance
- Release date: 10 October 2009 (Pusan International Film Festival)
- Running time: 82 minutes
- Country: Thailand
- Language: Thai

Mundane History (Thai: เจ้านกกระจอก) is a 2009 film by the Thai film-maker Anocha Suwichakornpong. She wrote, co-produced and directed the film. It is described as “one of the most startling and original feature debuts of recent years", and received its world premiere on 10 October 2009 at the 14th Busan International Film Festival in South Korea. It was the first Thai film to receive the country's most restrictive viewing rating, due to a scene of full-frontal male nudity and masturbation.

Mundane History won the Tiger Award at the 2010 International Film Festival Rotterdam.

== Plot ==
Mundane History centres on the friendship that develops between a young paralysed man from a wealthy Bangkok family and his male nurse from Isan in the North of Thailand. The film is also a commentary on Thailand's class-based society and the frailty of life. It premiered at the 2009 Pusan International Film Festival, where it was in the New Currents competition and also opened the World Film Festival of Bangkok. It made its European Premiere in the Tiger Awards competition at the International Film Festival Rotterdam, and was among the three films in 15-title line-up that won the Tiger Award.

== Main cast ==
- Arkaney Cherkam as Pun
- Paramej Noiam as Father
- Anchana Ponpitakthepkijo as Somjai
- Phakpoom Surapongsanuruk as Ake

== Production ==
Made for $150,000, Mundane History was financed by the filmmaker's family and friends as well as grants and awards from the Hubert Bals Fund of the Rotterdam International Film Festival.

== Rating ==
Featuring a scene of full-frontal male nudity and masturbation, it was the first Thai film under Thailand's motion-picture rating system to be given the most-restrictive 20+ rating.

== See also ==
- List of Thai films
- Nudity in film (East Asian cinema since 1929)
