= Toon Hiranyasap =

Toon Hiranyasub
- ทูน หิรัญทรัพย์
- Born: Robert Cespedes; October 24, 1954 (age 71); Thailand
- Occupations: Actor; singer
- Years active: 1980–present
- Height: 1.80 m (5 ft 11 in)
- Children: 3

Toon Hiranyasap (Thai: ทูน หิรัญทรัพย์, RTGS: Thun Hiranyasap; born October 24, 1954) is a Thai actor and singer. He is known for his work with Jarunee Suksawat.

== Early life and education ==
Hiranyasap was born to a Thai mother and a Filipino father, who died since Hiranyasap was at a young age. Shortly after graduated from Ruamrudee International School, he travelled to Tanzania with his stepfather for a year then came back to Thailand. He graduated with a Graphic Design degree from Victoria University, Australia.

== Career ==
His debut film role was in Kaew (แก้ว) by director Piak Poster, which immediately made him one of the more popular actors of the time. His other works include a comedy Khai Luk Kheuy (ไข่ลูกเขย), Khun Pu Su Sa, Khun Ya Sexy (คุณปู่ซู่ซ่า คุณย่าเซ็กซี่).

After many years of performing on stage, television dramas, special performance and films which can be counted more than 300, Hiranyasap took a break from the entertainment industry, and ventured in the business world. Recently, he has returned to Thai television series.

Hiranyasap's come-back performance was in a Thai comedy film Pan Rock Na Yon (Rock Never Die), about a popular 1970s rock band returning to stage in the year 2004.

Hiranyasap regularly appears in Thai television dramas or lakorn and in many special events and performances. In 2006, he co-starred in Invisible Waves, directed by Pen-Ek Ratanaruang. In this Thai-Japanese-Korean film production, in which he portrayed Wiwat.

== Personal life ==
He has three daughters, Nam Fon, Nam Wan and Nam Tan. After 39 years of marriage, he filed for divorce from his wife in 2018.
