= Ma Dashuai =

Chinese television series

Ma Dashuai (Chinese: 马大帅; pinyin: Mǎ Dàshuài) is a Chinese-language comedy drama TV series that was filmed and aired in China in three installments of approximately 30 episodes each from 2004 to 2006. The television program, directed by and starring Zhao Benshan (赵本山) in the title role with Fan Wei (范伟) as his brother-in-law, explores such subjects as socio-economic divergence between China's rural and urban populations, urban crime in China, migrant workers, indigence, and China's north-eastern lifestyle in general. The series juxtaposes rural backwardness with China's modern urban lifestyle, often to great comedic and dramatic effect.

The majority of the first series, originally aired in 2004, deals with Ma Dashuai leaving his northern rural village, where he was village head, for the big city in search of his daughter. Over the course of the series he must adapt to city life by begging, searching for work, and generally attempting to integrate into a society with a massive modern population.

In the second series, Ma Dashuai establishes a primary school for migrant and orphaned children and works as its principal, while the third series sees him lose it and fall into poverty once again.

Ma Dashuai can still be seen as re-runs across China, often with as many as six of the hour-long episodes shown back-to-back, on the country's CCTV network.
