= Pleasure Factory =

Film by Ekachai Uekrongtham

- International promotional poster.
- Directed by: Ekachai Uekrongtham
- Written by: Ekachai Uekrongtham
- Produced by: Ekachai Uekrongtham; Wouter Barendrecht; Michael J. Werner; Lim Teck
- Starring: Zihan Loo; Kuei-mei Yang; Ananda Everingham
- Cinematography: Brian Gothong Tan
- Edited by: Brian Gothong Tan
- Music by: Bruno Brugnano
- Production companies: Fortissimo Films; Spicy Apple Films
- Distributed by: Shaw Organisation (Singapore)
- Release dates: May 23, 2007 (Cannes); October 18, 2007 (Thailand); October 25, 2007 (Singapore)
- Running time: 88 minutes
- Countries: Singapore; Thailand
- Languages: Mandarin; English

Pleasure Factory (快乐工厂 Kuaile Gongchang) is a 2007 Singaporean-Thai docudrama film set in Geylang, the red-light district of Singapore. Directed by Ekachai Uekrongtham, the film was selected for the Un Certain Regard competition at the 2007 Cannes Film Festival.

The film is unusual in Southeast Asian cinema for its frank depiction of subjects traditionally hidden in Asian society, such as prostitution and same-sex relationships, and features explicit male nudity.

== Plot ==
A series of intertwining tales involve "pleasure seekers and pleasure providers" during the course of one night in Geylang, Singapore's red-light district. There are three distinct stories, united only by the presence of characters from all the stories in a streetside eatery:

- Jonathan, who has yet to lose his virginity, is escorted around Geylang by his army buddy, Kiat, who wants to help his friend make his passage into manhood. The two men visit various brothels, where the touts bestow the various qualities and nationalities of their women, who hail from China, Thailand, Malaysia, Indonesia, India and elsewhere. Jonathan eventually settles on a young Chinese woman whom he envisions being wrapped in a towel.
- A teenage girl is called to meet an older prostitute in a hotel room, where the older woman, Linda, is servicing a heavyset older man, who wants to take the younger girl's virginity. The girl is followed to the hotel by a young man named Chris. When she goes in the hotel room, Chris sits outside and waits.
- A woman in a red dress gets in a convertible with a man. She later shows up at the streetside restaurant and pays a young busker for his "special song", which he doesn't end up singing, and instead is taken back to the woman's room.

== Cast ==
- Yang Kuei-Mei as Linda
- Ananda Everingham as Chris
- Zihan Loo as Jonathan
- Katashi Chen as Kiat
- Jeszlene Zhou as Girl in Red Dress
- Isabella Chen as Teenage Girl
- Xu Er as Girl in White Towel
- Ian Francis Low as Busker

== Production ==
=== Origins ===
According to the film's production notes, Pleasure Factory is the first feature film to be shot entirely on actual locations in Geylang, the red-light district of Singapore.

"In the old days, the Geylang area used to be populated by processing factories for the coconut plantations," director Ekachai Uekrongtham said in notes prepared for the 2007 Cannes Film Festival. "These days, the machines are still running at full steam – producing pleasure for those seeking it, night after night. With Pleasure Factory, I've tried to strip bare the shields that prevent characters in the film from experiencing true pleasure. I'd like the film to have a vivid sense of realism and honesty. I'd like it to confront a world that's at once seedy and beautiful, dark and bright, sad and humorous, cold and warm, naked and all wrapped up. If pleasure can be mass-produced, what would be left on the assembly line when the machines stop?"

The film is the second feature film for director Ekachai, a Singapore-based theatre director who had previously directed the 2003 Thai biographical drama film, Beautiful Boxer.

It is a co-production of Singapore-based Spicy Apple Films, the Hong Kong-Netherlands company, Fortissimo Films and Singapore's InnoForm Media.

=== Casting ===
The major known cast members are Taiwanese actress Yang Kuei-mei who had been in such films as Ang Lee's 'Eat Drink Man Woman and Tsai Ming-liang's Goodbye, Dragon Inn, and Ananda Everingham from the Thai horror hit, Shutter. Other actors were newcomers, found through street casting in Geylang and around Singapore.

== Reception ==
The film was an "official selection" for the Un Certain Regard programme at the 2007 Cannes Film Festival.

It was acclaimed by European critics who attended the premiere screening. Nana A. T. Rebhan of Germany's arts and culture Channel Arte described the film as a "convincing portrait of a never-before-seen red-light district" and said "what makes this movie so special are the moments when people in the 'factory' step out of their usual rhythms - not functioning the way they should, unsure of their own actions and emotions."

Leonardo Lardieri of Italy's Sentieri Selvaggi called the film "a pleasurable surprise" and said it was able to "capture the fragility, the sense of abandonment and the pulsation of incessant desire - in a chain of beginnings and ends that continue to reincarnate itself night after night."

The approach of the film was described by other critics as "characterized by a unique tenderness."

French website Monsieur Cinema said "visually, the film is an enchantment – a contemplative waltz powered by the lights." It also said the director managed to "coldly show the horrors of sexual subordination and the distress of pleasure slaves" but "was also able to give the film a light touch when needed."

Orient Extrême called the film "a beautiful surprise" and said it's "a brilliant film on loneliness which avoids pessimism, and surprises by its mature and enlightened glance on a world too often caricaturized."

It was poorly received by critic Russell Edwards of the film industry journal Variety, who called the digital-video film "shoddy" and said "neither sexual nor audience satisfaction is guaranteed." Because of homoerotic elements, Edwards said he thought the film's chances of release in Singapore were slim. In the past, government censors had banned films with homosexual themes, before the introduction of a proper film classification system.

However, Christopher Chia, chief executive of Singapore's Media Development Authority, indicated in an interview that the film would be welcome, signaling that Singapore is loosening up on artistic expressions of sexuality. "We don't freak out about these things these days," Chia was quoted as saying.

The director Ekachai expressed optimism that his film would be shown in Singapore cinemas, saying "I think Singapore has been making conscious efforts to be less rigid. The country has a proper film classification system in place. It's also aspiring to have the creative freedom that comes with being a first-world country."

The Media Development Authority announced in October that Pleasure Factory was among a record five Singaporean films playing at the 2007 Pusan International Film Festival, where it was screened in the "Midnight Passion" section.

The film had a limited release in Thailand cinemas on 18 October 2007, and released in Singapore on 25 October.

== Soundtrack ==
The score is composed by Bruno Brugnano, and consists of ambient instrumental tracks.

The song during the opening credits is "Gei Wo Yige Wen" ("Give Me A Kiss") performed by Chang Loo. "Yueliang Daibiao Wo De Xin" ("The Moon Represents My Heart") is the busker's song. "Jinxiao Duo Zhenzhang" ("This Precious Night"), performed by Cui Ping, is played after the story of the Girl in Red and the busker.

== See also ==
- List of Thai films
- List of lesbian, gay, bisexual or transgender-related films
- List of lesbian, gay, bisexual, or transgender-related films by storyline
- Nudity in film (East Asian cinema since 1929)
