= Syndromes and a Century =

- Theatrical poster
- Directed by: Apichatpong Weerasethakul
- Written by: Apichatpong Weerasethakul
- Produced by: Wouter Barendrecht; Simon Field; Michael J. Werner; Keith Griffiths; Charles de Meaux; Pantham Thongsangl; Apichatpong Weerasethakul
- Starring: Nantarat Sawaddikul; Jaruchai Iamaram; Sophon Pukanok; Jenjira Pongpas
- Narrated by: Lee Chatametikool
- Cinematography: Sayombhu Mukdeeprom
- Edited by: Lee Chatametikool
- Music by: Kantee Anantagant
- Distributed by: Fortissimo Films; Strand Releasing
- Release date: August 30, 2006 (Venice Film Festival)
- Running time: 105 minutes
- Country: Thailand
- Language: Thai

Syndromes and a Century (Thai: แสงศตวรรษ, S̄æng ṣ̄atawǎat, literally Light of the Century) is a 2006 Thai drama film written and directed by Apichatpong Weerasethakul. The film was among the works commissioned for Peter Sellars' New Crowned Hope festival in Vienna to celebrate the 250th anniversary of the birth of Wolfgang Amadeus Mozart. It premiered on August 30, 2006, at the 63rd Venice Film Festival.

The film is a tribute to the director's parents and is divided into two parts, with the characters and dialogue in the second half essentially the same as the first, but the settings and outcome of the stories different. The first part is set in a hospital in rural Thailand, while the second half is set in a Bangkok medical center. "The film is about transformation, about how people transform themselves for the better," Apichatpong said in an interview.

In Thailand, Syndromes and a Century became controversial after the Board of Censors demanded that four scenes be cut in order for the film to be shown commercially. The director refused to cut the film and withdrew it from domestic release. Since then, the director had agreed to a limited showing in Thailand where the cut scenes were replaced with a black screen to protest and inform the public about the issues of censorship.

== Plot ==
It is a poetic, two-part film based on the filmmaker’s parents—both doctors—and his memories of growing up in hospital environments.

== Cast ==
- Nantarat Sawaddikul as Dr. Toey
- Jaruchai Iamaram as Dr. Nohng
- Nu Nimsomboon as Toa
- Sophon Pukanok as Noom, the orchid expert
- Jenjira Pongpas as Pa Jane
- Arkanae Cherkam as Dentist Ple
- Sakda Kaewbuadee as Monk Sakda
- Sin Kaewpakpin as Old Monk

== Production ==
=== Origins ===
"It's a film about heart," the director told the Bangkok Post. "It's not necessarily about love, it's more about memory. It's about feelings that have been forever etched in the heart."

It was originally entitled Intimacy and Turbulence and was to be an autobiographical look at his mother and father, who were both physicians working in a hospital in Khon Kaen, Thailand. But the director revised that concept when he cast the actors and began filming. The story still focuses on a male and female doctor, and is dedicated to the director's parents, but is set in two hospitals 40 years apart and explores both the memories and current lives of the protagonists.

"I began with my parents' story, but it has sprung to other things," Apichatpong said in an interview. "When I met the actors, when I found the location, there were other stories combined and added in. I try not to limit it. I allow it to flow whichever way it goes. It is very exciting."

== Reception ==
=== Critical reception ===
The film has an 89% "fresh" rating on Rotten Tomatoes, based on 44 reviews and an average rating of 7.60/10. The website's critical consensus reads, "Despite having little in the way of narrative, Apichatpong Weerasethakul's Syndromes is a poignant and mesmerizing memoir." Metacritic gives it a score of 71 out of 100, based on seven reviews.

Screen Daily noted the enigmatic, non-existent narrative while praising the film's technical aspects.

=== Top ten lists ===
The British Film Institute's Sight & Sound year-end poll for 2007 had Syndromes and a Century tied for seventh best with four other films. Syndromes also appeared on several critics' top ten lists of the best films of 2007.

- 1st – David Ansen, Newsweek
- 3rd – Nathan Lee, The Village Voice
- 5th – Wesley Morris, The Boston Globe
- 10th – Scott Tobias, The A.V. Club

In November 2009, the film was named by Toronto International Film Festival's Cinematheque as the best of the decade, as voted by more than sixty international film historians, archivists, curators, and programmers.

In BBC's 2016 poll of the greatest films since 2000, Syndromes and a Century ranked 60th.

=== Thai reception and censorship ===
A limited theatrical release in Bangkok was originally slated for April 19, 2007, but was indefinitely delayed after the Board of Censors demanded the removal of four scenes. Apichatpong refused to cut the film and withdrew it from domestic circulation.

He explained his reasons for doing so in an article in the Bangkok Post:

I, as a filmmaker, treat my works as I do my own sons or daughters. I don't care if people are fond of them or despise them, as long as I created them with my best intentions and efforts. If these offspring of mine cannot live in their own country for whatever reason, let them be free. There is no reason to mutilate them in fear of the system. Otherwise there is no reason for one to continue making art.

Two of the "sensitive" scenes involve doctors engaging in "inappropriate" conduct (kissing and drinking liquor) in a hospital; the others depict a Buddhist monk playing a guitar and two monks playing with a remote-control flying saucer. The censors refused to return the print unless the requested cuts were made.

Later in 2007, the film was shown twice in privately arranged screenings at the Alliance française in Bangkok.

The censorship of the film came about as a motion picture rating system was being considered by the National Legislative Assembly. A replacement for the 1930 film act, the ratings law contained a restrictive ratings structure and retained the government's powers to censor and ban films it deemed would "undermine or disrupt social order and moral decency, or that might impact national security or the pride of the nation".

To oppose the draft law, Apichatpong and other directors formed the Free Thai Cinema Movement. "We disagree with the right of the state to ban films," Apichatpong was quoted as saying. "There already are other laws that cover potential wrongdoings by filmmakers."

Ladda Tangsupachai, director of the Ministry of Culture's Cultural Surveillance Department, said the ratings law was needed because moviegoers in Thailand are "uneducated". "They're not intellectuals, that's why we need ratings," she was quoted as saying. Despite the protest, the law was passed on December 20, 2007.

After the passing of the new film act, Apichatpong resubmitted the film to the Board of Censors in hopes that they would be less restrictive. However, the board ordered two more scenes to be removed, in addition to the four they previously ordered for removal. He finally agreed to have the film censored, despite expressing regret over resubmitting the film at all. A producer for the film, Keith Griffiths, broke news of the censorship to Filmmaker and shared photographs of censors cutting the selected scenes from the film print.

This was the last chance to display my accumulated anger. This was not only about this film… there are countless films, self censored, censored, banned. Where is the audience's voice? In a way it was liberating but while watching the film, I felt so bad of course. It was the most stupid film ever shown.

— Apichatpong Weerasethakul

The censored film was shown for a limited run at the Paragon Cineplex in Bangkok, Thailand, opening on April 10, 2008. Each censored scene was replaced with scratched black film frames and silence, lasting as long as the original scene. A total of 15 minutes were cut from the film, with the longest censored scene running seven minutes.

At the showing, postcards were handed to ticket buyers, showing stills from the missing scenes and URLs to watch them on YouTube. Following complaints from moviegoers, the theater displayed a sign explaining the omission of scenes. A portion of the proceeds from ticket sales were donated to the Thai Film Foundation, who also hosted an exhibition about the history of Thai censorship at the theater.

Apichatpong expressed that he intends to donate the censored film print to the Thai National Film Archive.

=== Festivals and awards ===
Syndromes and a Century had its world premiere at the 2006 Venice Film Festival, where it was in competition. It was also screened at the New York Film Festival, Toronto International Film Festival, London International Film Festival, Vancouver International Film Festival, Chicago International Film Festival, Tokyo Filmex, Pusan International Film Festival, International Film Festival Rotterdam, Taipei Golden Horse Film Festival, Hong Kong International Film Festival, the Maryland Film Festival, and the Melbourne International Film Festival.

At the inaugural Asian Film Awards in 2007 in Hong Kong, the film won the Best Editor award for Lee Chatametikool. It was also nominated for best director and best cinematographer.

== DVD ==
Syndromes and a Century was released on Region 1 DVD on January 15, 2008 by Strand Releasing.

The UK DVD release of Syndromes and a Century (Region 2) by the British Film Institute is scheduled for June 30, 2008.

The French DVD of Syndromes and a Century is released by Survivance (with Luminous People in the special features)
