= Jeszlene Zhou =

Singaporean actress

Jeszlene Zhou (Chinese: 周子芸) is a Singapore-born former actress.

== Early life and education ==
Zhou spent her teenage years in Methodist Girls' School and graduated from The University of Sydney with a Master in Strategic Public Relations, the spring of 2015. She previously attained a Bachelor of Arts with distinction from Melbourne.

== Career ==
After a decade of being in the limelight, Zhou is currently working in digital communications. She has been published in PRNew's Media Training Guidebook Vol.5.

== Films and television ==
=== Feature films ===
| Year | Title | Role | Notes | Ref |
|---|---|---|---|---|
| 2007 | Pleasure Factory | Girl in Red Dress | | |
| 2009 | Blood Ties 還魂 | | | |
| | Forever | | | |

=== Short films ===
| Year | Title | Role | Notes | Ref |
|---|---|---|---|---|
| | 家福 (Jiafu) | | | |
| | 关于你 (Regarding You) | | | |
| | Hai Kou (海口) | | | |
| | Missing | | | |
| | Lullaby | | | |
| | Mickey | | | |
| | When Night Fa11s | | | |
| 2016 | Take Me Home | | | |
| | Child of the World | | | |
| | Feminine | | | |

=== Television ===
| Year | Title | Role | Notes | Ref |
|---|---|---|---|---|
| | Déjà vu | Jamie Chen | | |
| | Singapore Short Stories Project III | Sharlayne/Su Lon/Stephanie | | |
| | 泳闯琴关 (No Limits) | Pauline | | |
| 2008 | The Little Nyonya 小娘惹 | 金花 (Jin Hua) | | |
| 2010 | The Pupil | Cheryl | | |
| | 天堂情书:《姐妹缘》之《爱得及时》 | 利贞 | | |
| | Incredible Tales: The Gift | Amy / Claire | | |
| | Love Under Covers (Pilot) | Melissa | | |
| | Blue Windows (Telemovie) | | | |
| | REM Season 2 | Tessa | Cameo | |
| | Police and Thief | Sally | Cameo | |
| | Cody Rock and the Quest for MacGuvitonium | Emily | | |
