= Nisshabd =

- Directed by: Jahar Kanungo
- Written by: Jahar Kanungo
- Cinematography: Dilip Varma
- Edited by: Sameera Jain
- Release date: 2005
- Running time: 92 minutes
- Country: India
- Language: Bengali

Nisshabd (Reaching Silence) is an Indo-French collaborated film made in Bengali language, directed by Jahar Kanungo in 2005 with the support of Fonds Sud Cinema Fund, which made a distinct mark with its original theme and treatment.

== Plot ==
The story is about a man's obsession with silence and is unable to tolerate the various noises of Delhi. Sarit, a 30-year-old salesman, escapes to a village as he is about to lose his ability to communicate with others. There, where the villages are welcoming, he meets the woman of his dream. His obsession with silence, however, shatters his existence there and he is forced to return to the noisy Delhi again. It was screened at more than 20 international festivals and received 6 international awards. Critics in general have found the film funny, thought-provoking, and poignant. For the first time an Indian film received accolades for its sound design.

== Cast ==
- Trina Nileena Banerjee
- Sudeshna Basu
- Kaushiki Chakraborty
- Raman Chawla
- Robishankar Kar

== Awards ==
- In 2005, Cinefan-Festival of Asian and Arab Cinema (Best Film in Indian Competition Award section)
- In 2005, Pusan International Film Festival (Nominated in New Currents Award section)
- In 2006, Vesoul Asian Film Festival (Special Mention in Emile Guimet Award section)
- In 2006, Vesoul Asian Film Festival (Nominated in Golden Wheel section)
