= Blissfully Yours =

2002 Thai film

- The Thai film poster.
- Thai: สุดเสน่หา
- Literally: My Dearest
- Directed by: Apichatpong Weerasethakul
- Written by: Apichatpong Weerasethakul
- Produced by: Eric Chan; Charles de Meaux
- Starring: Kanokporn Thong-aram; Min Oo; Jenjira Jansuda
- Cinematography: Sayombhu Mukdeeprom
- Edited by: Lee Chatametikool
- Music by: NadiaL; Zentrady
- Production companies: Kick the Machine; Anna Sanders Films
- Distributed by: Sahamongkol Film International (Thailand)
- Release dates: May 17, 2002 (France); August 13, 2002 (Thailand)
- Running time: 125 minutes
- Country: Thailand
- Language: Thai

Blissfully Yours (Thai: สุดเสน่หา, romanized: S̄ud s̄aǹeh̄ā) is a 2002 Thai romance film written and directed by Apichatpong Weerasethakul. It won the Un Certain Regard prize at the 2002 Cannes Film Festival.

== Plot ==
Min is an illegal Burmese immigrant living in Thailand who has contracted a mysterious painful rash covering his upper body. His girlfriend, Roong, and a middle-aged woman, Orn, take him to see a doctor. Min pretends that he cannot speak because he is not fluent in Thai and speaking would reveal him to be an illegal immigrant. The doctor treats him, but because he does not have proper ID documents, refuses to supply him with the medical papers necessary to get a work permit. Roong pays Orn to help Min. Orn's prescribed medication is also mentioned, and while the doctor insists it is prescribed for stress relief, Orn claims her neighbor told her it was a powerful anti-depressant. Orn mentions that the medicine curbs her sexual appetite and that she might like to have another child with her husband. The doctor advises her not to take the medicine on days she intends to be intimate with her husband.

Orn brings Min to her husband's work and instead of using the prescription she got for Min's rash, Orn prepares a homemade concoction, a mix of finely chopped vegetables and store-bought skin creams. Orn also mentions to her husband that she'd like to have another child. The husband's response is negative and blames Orn for their first-born child drowning. Orn feeds the husband the homemade skin concoction. While waiting in silence, Min is approached by a man who places his hand on Min's lap suggestively.

Roong works in a factory, painting ceramic figurines of American cartoons. She does not want to work after having worked overtime the day before. Min and Orn drive over to the factory, and Roong feigns an illness and takes off with Min. She drives into the countryside, while Min directs her to a secret location she does not know. They come upon a cliff-side plateau overlooking the mountainous jungle. Roong is surprised by the beautiful view and they have a romantic picnic on the cliff and later by a river in the jungle. It is mentioned briefly by Roong that she dislikes Orn, and she also claims that no one likes the senior woman because she is fake.

Orn meanwhile has sex with one of her husband's co-workers. They are suddenly interrupted when his motorcycle is stolen. The man chases after the thief and disappears, leaving Orn in anxious solitude. She ends up lost in the woods, and eventually stumbles upon the young lovers by the river while Roong is engaging in fellatio with Min.

Orn approaches the young couple after they finish. Roong leads Orn, who is initially hesitant, into a stream where they both rub lotion on Min. They then dry off and lie down by the river bank, Roong with Min and Orn by herself. Orn looks over at the couple and becomes emotional. She discovers ants on all the picnic articles and throws the majority of the garbage into the river. Orn steals a cigarette, lies down and begins to cry. Meanwhile, Roong dozes while playing with Min's penis and whispering Min's name. The final shot is of Roong turning over and gazing towards the camera.

The film ends with text stating: December 2001. Min is in Bangkok while waiting for work at a casino on the Thai-Cambodian border. Roong got back together with her boyfriend and they sell noodles in a town not far from Bangkok. Orn continues working as an extra in Thai movies.

== Cast ==
- Kanokporn Tongaram as Roong
- Min Oo as Min
- Jenjira Jansuda as Orn

== Title sequence and soundtrack ==
The opening title credits roll about 45 minutes into the film, during Roong and Min's drive into the jungle. Roong turns on the car radio and the music playing is a Thai-language version of "Summer Samba (So Nice)", composed by Marcos Valle and sung by the Thai artist, Nadia.

== Release and alternate versions ==
Because of its graphic sex scenes, the film was censored in Thailand, with about 10 minutes cut from the Thai DVD release by La-ong Dao. It was then released Region-free on DVD in the United Kingdom in PAL format by Second Run in 2006, in the United States in NTSC format in 2007 through Strand Releasing and by mk2 in France.

As of 2022 there is no Blu-ray release available.

== Reception ==
=== Critical response ===
Blissfully Yours has received mostly positive reviews from critics. On review aggregator website Rotten Tomatoes, the film holds a 90% approval rating based on 10 reviews, with an average rating of 7.6/10. On Metacritic, the film has a weighted average score of 82/100 based on eight reviews, indicating "generally favorable reviews".

Blissfully Yours received 10 votes in the British Film Institute's decennial Sight & Sound polls of the greatest films ever made.

=== Accolades ===
- 2002 Cannes Film Festival – Un Certain Regard Prize
- 2002 Thessaloniki Film Festival – Golden Alexander
- 2002 Tokyo FilmEx – Grand Prize
- 2003 International Film Festival Rotterdam – Circle of Dutch Film Critics (KNF) Award
- 2003 Buenos Aires International Festival of Independent Cinema – Best director and FIPRESCI Prize
- 2003 Singapore International Film Festival – Young Cinema Award

== See also ==
- List of Thai films
- Nudity in film § East Asian cinema since 1929
