= Gao Xiumin (actress) =

Chinese actress

- 高秀敏
- Born: 1958 or 1959
- Died: August 18, 2005 (aged 46); Changchun, Jilin, China
- Occupation(s): Skit, sitcom and television actress
- Partner: He Qingkui
- Children: 1

Gao Xiumin (Chinese: 高秀敏; pinyin: Gāo Xiùmǐn; 1958 or 1959 – 18 August 2005) was a Chinese comedy actress.

She was a regular at the CCTV New Year's Galas, and was famous in partnership with Zhao Benshan and Fan Wei. She played Ding Xiang in Chinese TV Series "Liu Laogen".

She died from heart disease in 2005.

== Television ==
Year	English title	Chinese title	Role	Notes
1990	Yueya Ditch	月芽沟		
1995	Golden Bay	金色海湾		
1996		夜深人不静		
1996		黑土地黄棉袄		
1997	Head of a Village	一乡之长		
1998		晚霞不是梦		
1998		农家十二月	Aunt	
2001	Northeast Family	东北一家人	guest	
2001	Liu Laogen	刘老根	Ding Xiang	
2002	Liu Laogen 2	刘老根2	Ding Xiang	
2003	Kite Fate	风筝奇缘	Wife	
2004	Marine Club	水兵俱乐部	Mother	
2004	Boys and Girls	男生女生	Mother of Li Nan	
2005	Holy Water Lake	圣水湖畔	Ma Lian	
2005	Surviving Workers	生存之民工	Businesswoman	
2005	Magistrate Yellow Jacket	县令黄马褂	Wife	
2005	Remarriage of a Woman	半路夫妻	Mother	

== CCTV New Year's Gala ==
Year	English title	Chinese title	Cast	Notes
1998	New Year Greetings	拜年	Zhao Benshan, Fan Wei	
1999	Feel for Others	将心比心	Fan Wei, Heimei	
2001	Selling a Cane	卖拐	Zhao Benshan, Fan Wei	
2002	Selling a Bike	卖车	Zhao Benshan, Fan Wei	
2003	Anxiety	心病	Zhao Benshan, Fan Wei	
2004	Water Delivery Worker	送水工	Zhao Benshan, Fan Wei	
