= Porntip Papanai =

Thai actress and model

- พรทิพย์ ปาปะนัย
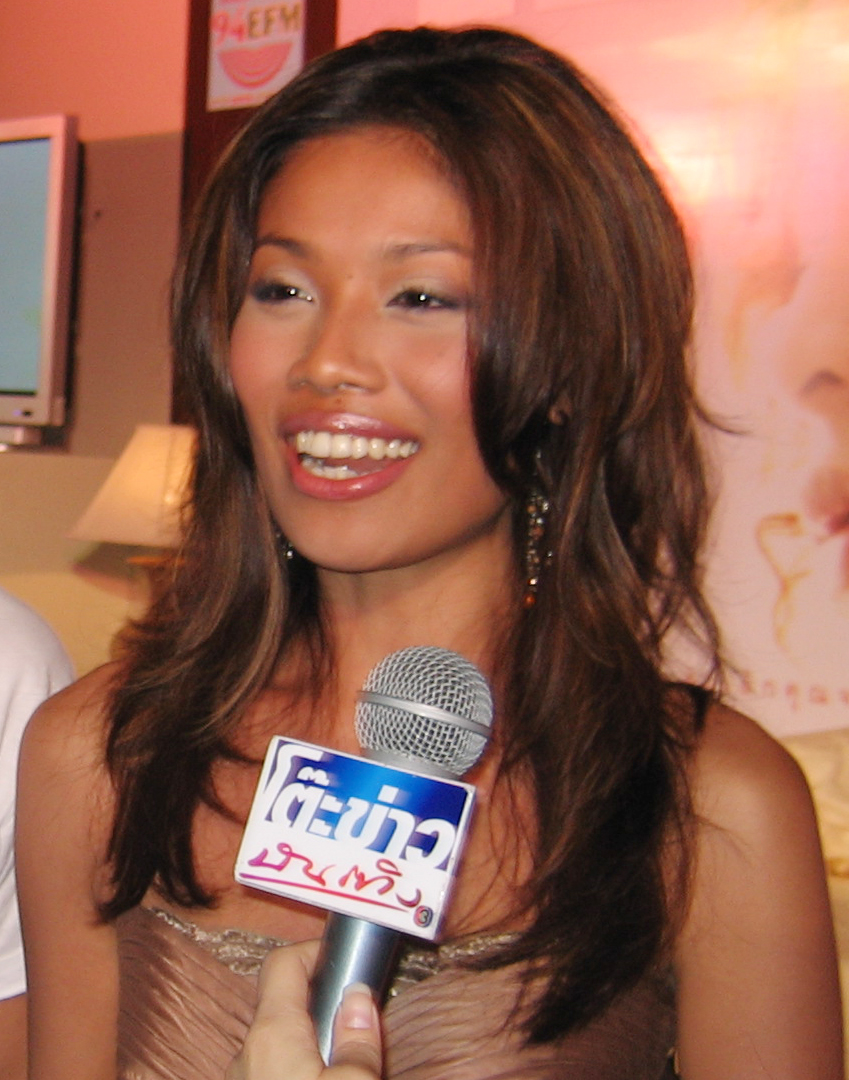
- Porntip at the press preview of Ploy in June 2007 in Bangkok
- Born: 1982 (age 43–44); Krabi, Thailand
- Other name: Cartoon
- Occupation: Actress
- Years active: 2001–present

Porntip Papanai (Thai: พรทิพย์ ปาปะนัย, RTGS: Phonthip Papanai, nickname Cartoon; born 1982 in Krabi) is a Thai actress. Among her film roles are supporting parts in Pen-Ek Ratanaruang's Monrak Transistor (2001), in which she played the country singer Dao, and Ploy (2007), in which she portrayed Tum, the hotel maid.

She portrayed the legendary Thai ghost Mae Nak in Ghost of Mae Nak in 2005 In 2008 she also featured in Queen of Langkasuka by Nonzee Nimibutr and in 2009 in Nymph, a film about the Thai legendary Nang Mai tree deity.

== Films ==
- Monrak Transistor (มนต์รักทรานซิสเตอร์) 2001.
- Ghost of Mae Nak (นาค รักแท้ วิญญาณ ความตาย) 2005.
- The Elephant King 2006.
- Ploy (พลอย) 2007.
- Soi Cowboy (ซอยคาวบอย) 2008.
- Queens of Langkasuka (ปืนใหญ่จอมสลัด) 2008.
- Nymph (นางไม้) 2009.
- Mindfulness and Murder (ศพไม่เงียบ) 2010.
- Khun Rong Plat Chu (ขุนรองปลัดชู) 2012.
