= Siwat Chotchaicharin =

Thai actor, singer and television host

- ศิวัฒน์ โชติชัยชรินทร์
- Born: Siwat Chotchaicharin; January 27, 1982 (age 44); Hat Yai, Songkhla, Thailand
- Other name: Cee
- Education: Assumption University
- Occupations: Actor; model; singer; TV host; YouTuber
- Years active: 2003–present
- Agent(s): Channel 7 (2003–2018); Workpoint (2018–present)
- Height: 1.72 m (5 ft 7 1/2 in)
- Spouse: Amika Klinprathum (m. 2014)

Siwat Chotchaicharin (Thai: ศิวัฒน์ โชติชัยชรินทร์), better known by his nickname Cee (ซี), is a Thai actor, singer and TV host. He attended Assumption University, earning a Bachelor of Business Administration. He also played Fon Luang, a leading role in the musical Klaikangwol: Musical On The Beach, the first Thai beach musical, which was held at Hua Hin from 20 to 24 February 2013.

== Personal life ==
Siwat Chotchaicharin married Amika Klinprathum on 8 June 2014 at Chakrabongse Palace

== Filmography ==
Year	Title	Role
2005	Ghost of Mae Nak	Mak
2024	Moei: The Promised	A

== Drama ==
Year	Title	Role
2003	Supabaroot Luke Pu Chai	Bo
2003	Benja Keta Kwarm Ruk	Saifa
2004	Langkhaa Dang	Santhat
2004	Oun Ai Ruk	Kimhan
2004	Ruk Sud Kua	Kongphop
2005	Mae Khun Toon Hua	Nat
2005	Look Mai Lark See	Chanokchon
2006	Rak Tid Lob	Tawin
2006	Sai Lom Gub Sam Rouw	Rongkla
2006	Pinmook	Atiya
2007	Khao Ha Wa Noo Pen Jao Ying	Nai Than
2007	Nong Miew Kiew Petch	Sila
2007	Pieng Peun Fah	Danny
2008	Pleng Din Klin Dao	Pathapee
2008	Rae Rai Look Sao Pa	Tawan
2008	Brave Man Standing	Plerng Gumpanard
2008	Koo Pbuan Olawon	Suphasit
2009	Rook Kard	Plerng Gumpanard
2010	Pleng Rak Talay Taii	Nakorn
2010	Khun Mor Mor 3	Tanchaiyuth
2010	Sawan Saang	Nakrop
2011	Bo Bay	Piak
2011	Lily See Kularb	Nop
2012	Doot Tawan Dang Pupah	Tai
2013	Khun Chai Liang Mu, Khun Mu Liang Kae	Phuwanai
2014	Payu Taewada	Tewa
2014	Neth Nakarat	Atsawin
2015	Khon La Lok	Tibet
2016	Khun Krating	Mahachat / Krating
2017	Wang Nang Hong	Danu / Payatanarakratchapakdee
2018	Lep Krut	Kom Sarakupt / Cheep Chuchai
2019	Kaew Khon Lek	Mekhin
2024	Phleng Lam Kham Khuean Kaeo	Wanphut

== Host ==
- Eragon TV Special (2006)
- Drilling the field@Midnight' (2007–2009)
- Janpandao (2013–2018)
- Martial Warrior ชิงฝันแอ็กชั่นสตาร์ (2014)
- เก่งคิด พิชิตคำ Spelling Star (2016)
- Hua Na Ha Khuap (2018)
- Bigheads Thailand (2018)
- Nak Rong Song Mi (2018–2020)
- Ching Roi Ching Lan (2018–2023)
- 123 Ranking Show (2019)
- 3 เงาเขย่าเพลง (2019)
- มโน VS มหาชน (2019)
- เพลงเอก (2020–2024)
- กิ๊กไลฟ์ (2020–2021)
- ยืน 1 ถึง 3 (2020)
- ปัญญาปันสุข Live (2021)
- โจ๊กตัดโจ๊ก พักยก (2021)
- เงาเผาขน (2021–2022)
- ลูกทุ่งสิบทิศ (2022)
- นักร้อง 2 ชั้น (2022)
- Mor Lam Idol (2023–2024)
- My Boyfriend is Better (2023–2024)
- LOL: Last One Laughing Thailand (2024)
- O La Nor I Love Thailand (2024)
- Sing Me Your Song (2024)
- The Wall Song (2024–present)
- The Mask Soulmate (2024–2025)

== Citations ==
- "ศิวัฒน์ โชติชัยชรินทร์". BBTV Channel 7 (in Thai). Bangkok Broadcasting & TV Co., Ltd. 2013.
- Chanasongkram, Kanokporn (15 February 2013). "Far from worries". Bangkok Post.
