= Getting Home =

- Film poster
- Directed by: Zhang Yang
- Written by: Zhang Yang; Wang Yao
- Produced by: Stanley Tong; Er Yong; Zhang Yang
- Starring: Zhao Benshan; Song Dandan; Guo Degang; Hu Jun; Xia Yu; Wu Ma
- Cinematography: Yu Lik-wai; Lai Yiu-fai
- Edited by: Yang Hongyu
- Music by: Dou Peng
- Distributed by: Worldwide: Fortissimo Films
- Release date: 25 January 2007 (Hong Kong)
- Running time: 90 minutes
- Countries: China; Hong Kong
- Language: Mandarin Chinese

Getting Home (simplified Chinese: 落叶归根; traditional Chinese: 落葉歸根; pinyin: Lùo yè gūi gēn) is a 2007 comedy drama film directed by Zhang Yang and starring Chinese comedian Zhao Benshan. A Chinese-Hong Kong co-production, the film is episodic and follows two workers in their 50s, Zhao (Zhao Benshan) and Liu (Hong Qiwen). It opens when Liu unexpectedly dies after a night of drinking and Zhao decides to fulfill a promise to his friend to get him home, beginning a long odyssey from Shenzhen to Chongqing with Liu's corpse on his back. Along the way, Zhao meets a variety of figures, played by several of China's better known character actors.

Getting Home is Zhang Yang's fifth feature film. It was produced by Filmko Entertainment of Hong Kong and the Beijing Jinqianshengshi Culture Media company of the People's Republic of China. International sales and distribution was by Fortissimo Films out of Amsterdam.

Getting Home's original title derives from a Chinese proverb meaning "A falling leaf returns to its roots." It is apparently based on a true story.

== Cast ==
- Zhao Benshan as Zhao a middle-age worker who decides to carry his deceased friend home
- Hong Qiwen as Liu
- Song Dandan as a middle-age homeless woman who sells her blood for money
- Guo Degang as a ringleader of a gang of thieves who attempts to hold up the bus Zhao first uses to transport Liu's corpse
- Hu Jun as a trucker who drives Zhao and Liu a part of the way
- Xia Yu as a cyclist attempting to bicycle to Tibet
- Wu Ma as an elderly, wealthy, lonely man who Zhao meets along his journey
- Liu Jinshan as a thuggish restaurateur
- Chen Ying and Guo Tao as husband and wife beekeepers who have rejected modern society

== Production ==
Originally titled Air, Getting Home was financed by Filmko Films and Fortissimo Films and produced by Peter Loehr (of Ming Productions and the Imar Film Company) and Wouter Barendrecht of Fortissimo. This marked the first collaboration between Zhang and Filmko but the fifth with Fortissimo.

Though the film documents Zhao's journey from Shenzhen to Chongqing, the majority of shooting took place in Yunnan, a Chinese province in the southwest.

== Reception ==
Getting Home had its Western debut in the 2007 Berlin International Film Festival on 11 February 2007, as part of the festival's Panorama series. There it won the Prize of the Ecumenical Jury. Since Berlin, Getting Home has made the rounds in the festival circuit, including Silk Screen Asian American Film Festival, Deauville and the New York Asian Film Festival.

Western critics, meanwhile, have embraced the film, with several noting that, while the synopsis recalls the American comedy Weekend at Bernie's, Getting Home far surpasses that film in plot, cast, and drama. One critic notes that the film is "a perfectly pitched and quite heartwarming drama about friendship and promises, with a welcome drop of dark humour." Several magazines, including Variety and that's Beijing praised the performance of Zhao Benshan in particular as "finely calibrated" and "vivid" respectively.
