= Switch Off =

2013 film

Switch Off is a short film directed by Anoop Gangadharan. It is the first short film which features only gadgets and was selected for Limca Book of Records.
