= Invisible Waves =

2006 film by Pen-Ek Ratanaruang

- Film poster.
- Directed by: Pen-Ek Ratanaruang
- Written by: Prabda Yoon
- Produced by: Hiromi Aihara; Faruk Alatan; Wouter Barendrecht; Winnie Lau; Miky Lee; Mingmongkol Sonakul; Michael J. Werner; Daniel Yu Wai-Kwok
- Starring: Tadanobu Asano; Toon Hiranyasap; Kang Hye-jung; Ken Mitsuishi; Eric Tsang; Maria Cordero
- Cinematography: Christopher Doyle
- Edited by: Patamanadda Yukol
- Music by: Hualampong Riddim
- Distributed by: Five Star Production; Fortissimo Films; Palm Pictures
- Release dates: 14 February 2006 (Germany); 17 February 2006 (Thailand); 13 April 2006 (Hong Kong); 20 April 2006 (Singapore)
- Running time: 115 minutes
- Countries: Thailand; South Korea; Hong Kong
- Languages: English; Japanese; Thai; Cantonese

Invisible Waves (Thai: คำพิพากษาของมหาสมุทร) is a 2006 crime film by Thai director Pen-Ek Ratanaruang, with screenplay by Prabda Yoon, cinematography by Christopher Doyle, and starring Tadanobu Asano – all people that Pen-Ek had worked with on his previous film, Last Life in the Universe. It had its world premiere at the Berlin Film Festival and was also shown at the 2006 Bangkok International Film Festival and the 2006 Toronto International Film Festival.

== Plot ==
Kyoji is a cook living in Macau. He works for a Thai restaurant in Hong Kong and has been having an affair with Seiko, the wife of his boss, Wiwat, who orders Kyoji to poison her. After the deed is done, Kyoji is ordered to leave Hong Kong. He consults with the mysterious Monk, who gives him money and advice to contact Lizard. Kyoji then boards a cruise ship, and is given a small, dreary cabin belowdecks, where nothing seems to work properly. In trying to find his way back topside, he gets lost. Finally, up on deck, he meets Noi. Noi has a baby named Nid, whom Kyoji finds hanging on the deck rail in a harness, where Noi left the child while she was swimming. Eventually, the ship reaches its destination, Phuket, Thailand, where real life-or-death adventures begin for Kyoji as he starts to put the pieces together about what he's done.

== Cast ==
- Tadanobu Asano as Kyoji
- Maria Cordero as Maria
- Toon Hiranyasap as Wiwat
- Kang Hye-jung as Noi
- Ken Mitsuishi as Lizard
- Eric Tsang as Monk
- Tomono Kuga as Seiko

== Awards and nominations ==
- 2006 Berlin International Film Festival – world premiere, nominated for Golden Bear.
- 2006 Bangkok International Film Festival – in competition and opening film.

=== Oscar controversy ===
Invisible Waves had been announced as Thailand's entry for Best Foreign Language Film at the 79th Academy Awards by the Federation of National Film Associations of Thailand, but was then withdrawn and replaced with Ahimsa ... Stop to Run, which upset the Invisible Waves production company, Five Star Production. The film federation said that the reason for the change was that a print of the film wouldn't be available in time to send to the Academy for consideration, but Five Star, sales agent Fortissimo Films and distributor Palm Pictures stated that was not true. Earlier, the federation had opposed the film's opening of the 2006 Bangkok International Film Festival, stating that since it was an international co-production it was not truly a Thai film.
