= Zhao Benshan =

Chinese actor

- 赵本山
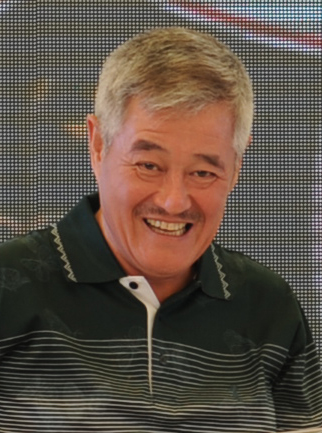
- Born: 2 October 1957 (age 69); Kaiyuan County, Tieling, Liaoning, China
- Other name: Uncle Benshan (本山大叔)
- Education: Lianhua Middle School
- Occupations: Actor; comedian; television director; businessman
- Years active: 1980 — present
- Notable work: I want to have a family (我想有个家)
- Spouses: Ge Shuzhen (葛淑珍) (m. 1979; div. 1992); Ma Lijuan (马丽娟) (m. 1992)
- Children: 2
- Awards: Hundred Flowers Award for Best Actor; Huabiao Award for Outstanding Actor

Zhao Benshan (simplified Chinese: 赵本山; traditional Chinese: 趙本山; pinyin: Zhào Běnshān; born 2 October 1957) is a Chinese comedian and businessman. Starting as an errenzhuan performer in his native Liaoning, he rose to household fame in China for his comedy sketches on the CCTV New Year's Gala, the world's most-watched television program, which he performed on annually from 1990 to 2011. He starred in films such as Happy Times (2000), Getting Home (2007), The Grandmaster (2013), and directed or produced television series depicting rural life in Liaoning, including Liu Laogen, Ma Dashuai, and Xiangcun Aiqing.

As a businessman, initially drawing on the connections he had built through his performances, Zhao founded a company in 1993 engaged in coal and transportation. In 2003, he established Benshan Media, which has managed his troupe and operated in television and film production. From 2012 to 2015, Zhao faced political difficulties due to his alleged associations with Wang Lijun and Bo Xilai. Although he weathered these difficulties, Zhao largely retired thereafter.

== Biography ==
Zhao was born in Lianhua village, Kaiyuan, Liaoning province, to a peasant family. He was orphaned at the age of 6. Apprenticed to his uncle, he learned many local traditional performance arts, including erhu, a traditional Chinese musical instrument, and Errenzhuan, a traditional style of stand-up comedy that involves two people talking to each other on the stage which is popular in northeastern China.

Jiang Kun, a nationally renowned xiangsheng artist, recommend Zhao to appear at the 1990 CCTV New Year's Gala, a TV program broadcast all over China to celebrate Chinese New Year. After his first appearance, he had appeared in each Gala show every year from 1995 to 2011. Zhao's skits focus on social issues, including wealth disparity, the urban-rural divide, family and relationships, trust in society, and social changes in the era of economic reform. His works often drew inspiration from his own life in rural northeastern China.

Zhao's most memorable performances have included "Yesterday, today and tomorrow" and "Fixing up the house" with Song Dandan, "Bainian" with Fan Wei and Gao Xiumin, a reprisal of "Yesterday, today, and tomorrow" with Song Dandan and Cui Yongyuan in 2006, and "Don't need money" in 2009 with Bi Fujian and Xiaoshenyang. Zhao became a household name in China since he began appearing at the Gala. His performances have generally received critical acclaim, earning the 'top-grade' prize (一等奖) for the "skits" category for thirteen years in a row between 1999 and 2011. Zhao's skit was almost always one of the most anticipated and talked-about events of the Gala.

Despite his inevitably propagandist works, Zhao's gala performances represented the zenith of the "country bumpkin" character type, who, quite similar to the court fools in medieval Europe, were licensed to speak truth to and make fun of power with immunity. By assuming a distinct persona of a peasant jester, Zhao was able to cathartically satirize the hypocrisy, greed, and corruption of the elite and the state in reform-era China.

Zhao has appeared as an actor in many films, including Zhang Yimou's Happy Times (2000) where he played an aging bachelor who really wanted to get married.

Zhao was also active in producing and directing several successful television series. He acted as the title character in the series Liu Laogen and Ma Dashuai, as well as a secondary character in Xiangcun Aiqing ("Country Love") and their sequels.

In 2004, Zhao co-founded the Benshan School of Art in collaboration with Liaoning University, which renamed the school in 2015 by dropping his name.

Zhao was nominated for the Best Actor Award for his performance in Getting Home at the 2007 Golden Horse Awards, held in Taipei on 8 December 2007. He lost to Tony Leung for his work in Lust, Caution.

Zhao took part in the Beijing 2008 Summer Olympics torch relay by being a torchbearer in the Liaoning leg of the relay in Shenyang, capital of Liaoning Province. In 2008, the theme of this year's Spring Festival Gala was "Hand in Hand for the Olympics", and Zhao Benshan's skit "Torchbearer" expressed every Chinese person's expectation for the Olympics in CCTV CMG New Year's Gala.

In 2009, Zhao was studying in the 4th intake CEO class at Cheung Kong Graduate School of Business. In September 2009, Zhao was in the news again following a cerebral aneurysm rupture. He was said to be in a stable condition after an operation, although close associates have mentioned that he often felt unwell in recent years when he is exhausted on the set.

Zhao's apprentice, Xiaoshenyang, performed in the 2009 and 2010 CCTV New Year's Galas. Zhao has not performed at the CCTV New Year's Gala since 2012, which has led to public speculation about his health and his conflict with 2012 gala director Ha Wen. 2012 was the first time since 1994 that he did not perform at the annual event.

From 2012 to 2016, Zhao faced political difficulties, apparently stemming from his alleged associations with Wang Lijun and Bo Xilai, both of whom had served in Liaoning. In September 2014, Zhejiang Television canceled the planned broadcast of a television drama produced by Zhao. The broadcaster stated that it had received last-minute instructions from the State Administration of Press, Publication, Radio, Film and Television citing "subject-matter concerns." The following month, Zhao was notably absent from several major cultural forums, including the literature and arts symposium convened on 15 October 2014 and chaired by Xi Jinping. On 21 October, Zhao appeared in an interview with People's Daily Online, stating that he would "follow the Party's guidance." He also led company-wide study sessions of Xi Jinping's speeches and made public statements expressing willingness to contribute personal assets, including private aircraft, in support of the state.

In January 2015, the State Administration of Press, Publication, Radio, Film and Television issued a statement denying that any ban on Zhao had been imposed, describing the widespread rumors as false. On the same day, Zhao's company released a formal rebuttal—its first official statement addressing such speculation. Zhao subsequently made several public appearances in 2015, including a musical performance in Tieling on 12 January and attendance at the opening session of the Chinese People's Political Consultative Conference on 3 March. In June 2015, Liaoning University removed Zhao's name from an affiliated school bearing his name. Although Zhao weathered these political difficulties, he largely withdrew from public view thereafter.

In February 2025, Zhao led the opening performance of his troupe's international tour in New York, marking his first major stage appearance in over a decade.

== Entrepreneurship ==
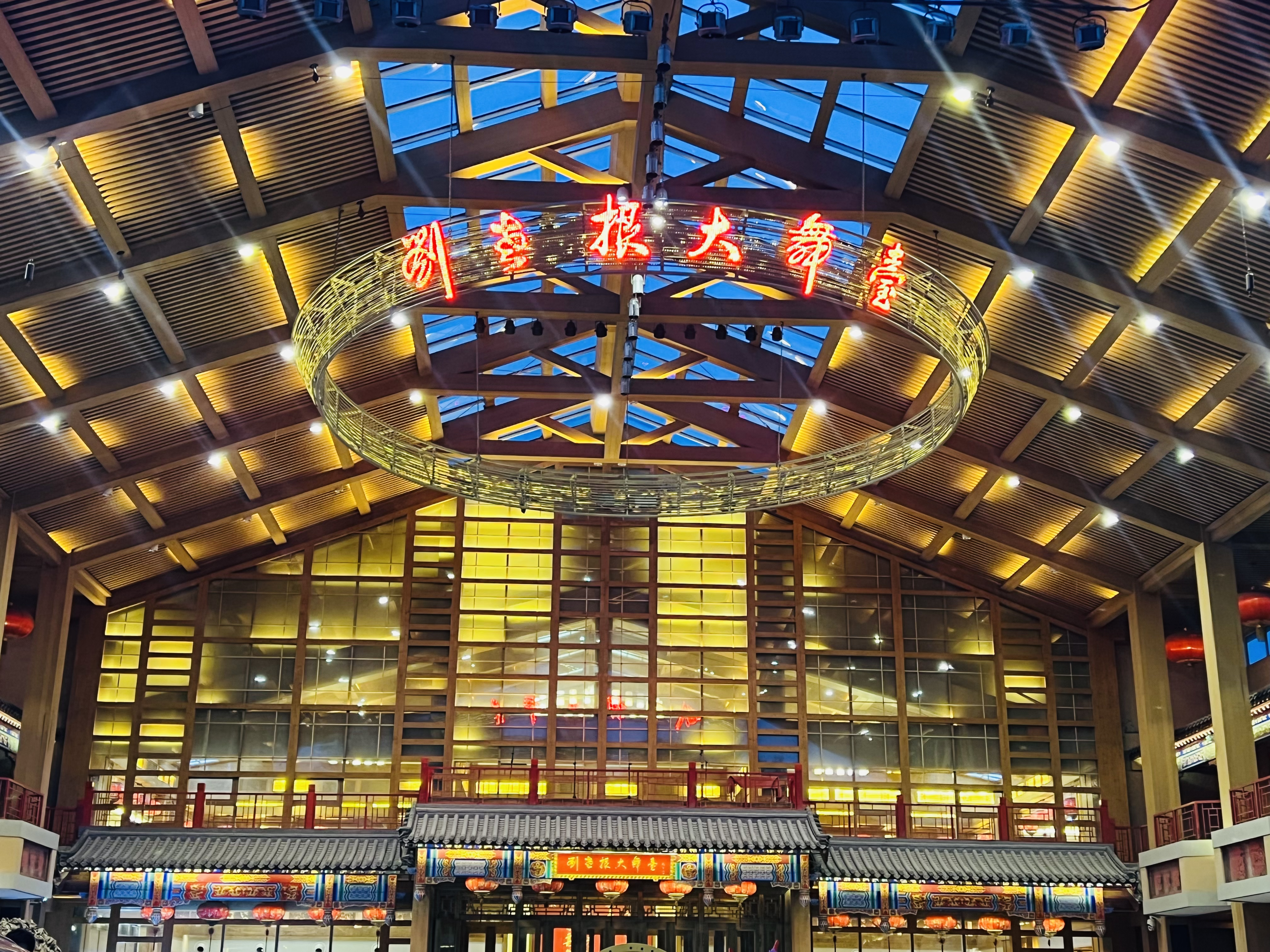
Liu Laogen Grand Stage in July 2023.

Zhao is an entrepreneur and has led many business ventures. Zhao Benshan performs at the residency show at the "Liulaogen Guild Hall" (刘老根大舞台). The Hall is located in the Qianmen area of Beijing, just south of Tiananmen Square and is immersed in part in building compounds with a history of some 280 years. Zhao's show also tours in Shenyang, Changchun, Harbin and Jilin. Reportedly, these shows grossed over 100 million yuan (about US$14.64 million) in 2008.

In 2004, Zhao Benshan co-founded the Benshan Art Academy at Liaoning University, to nurture new Errenzhuan players. In 2005, he established Benshan Media Group, the parent company of Liaoning Folk Art Troupe, Benshan Production, Ruidong Culture Development Co. Ltd and Benshan Arts Academy.

In 2007, Zhao led his performing troupe to tour North America. They performed Errenzhuan in six cities including New York, Los Angeles and Vancouver.

== Personal life ==
Zhao married Ge Shuzhen (葛淑珍) in 1979. Ge, a farmer from a village near Kaiyuan, was 19 at the time of their wedding. The two had a daughter, Yufang, and son, Tiedan, who had osteomalacia and emphysema as well as heart problems. Zhao and Ge divorced in 1992; Ge took custody of the children. Ge Shuzhen worked a series of menial labour jobs after their divorce before becoming an entrepreneur. His son Tiedan died in 1994 at the age of 12. His daughter Yufang and her husband are reportedly local restaurateurs.

In 1992, Zhao married his second wife, Ma Lijuan (马丽娟), a Hui woman from Chifeng, Inner Mongolia. In 1997 the couple had fraternal twins named Zhao Yinan and Zhao Jiaxuan.

On September 30, 2009, it was reported Zhao had suffered a cerebral hemorrhage and was sent to hospital in Shanghai. In December 2009, Zhao purchased a Bombardier Challenger 850 at a cost of 200 million yuan (US$30 million). He later stated that he was thinking of replacing the Challenger 850 with a newer Boeing or Gulfstream jet.

== Filmography ==
=== Film ===
- Don't Kidding Me (1987)
- Xian Shi Huo Bao (1990)
- Whoever Comes Is a Guest (1990)
- Keep Cool (1997) - Poet reader
- The Emperor and the Assassin (1999) - Gao Jianli
- Happy Times (2000) - Zhao
- Getting Home (2007)
- A Simple Noodle Story (2009)
- Just Call Me Nobody (2010)
- The Founding of a Party (2011) - Duan Qirui
- The Lion Roars 2 (2012)
- Accidental Hero (2012)
- The Grandmaster (film) (2013)
- The New Year's Eve of Old Lee (2016)

=== Television ===
- Liu Laogen - (2002), title character
- Ma Dashuai - (2004), title character
- Xiangcun Aiqing (2006−2019), recurring character

== See also ==
- Huyou skits
