= Jahar Kanungo =

Jahar Kanungo is an Indian film and documentary director and producer in Bengali. He is also a story writer and his debut movie is Nisshabd released in 2005.

== Personal life ==
Jahar Kanungo was born in 1946 in Chittagong. He has worked in theatre and still photography, as well as writing travelogues, short stories and children's plays, published in leading Bengali literary journals. He has made documentaries and researched and photographed the tiger cult in the Sunderbans. In 1993, Kanungo founded his own company, Kanungo Media Pvt. Ltd. Reaching Silence is his first feature film. He is married to Lima Kanungo.

== Filmography ==
- Partners in Peril (1995)
- Nisshabd (Reaching Silence) (2005)

== Awards ==
The film, Nisshabd has won many awards in various film festivals

- In 2005, Cinefan-Festival of Asian and Arab Cinema (Best Film in Indian Competition Award section)
- In 2005, Pusan International Film Festival (Nominated in New Currents Award section)
- In 2006, Vesoul Asian Film Festival (Special Mention in Emile Guimet Award section)
- In 2006, Vesoul Asian Film Festival (Nominated in Golden Wheel section)
