= Penguin Villa =

- Genres: Pop/Rock
- Labels: Smallroom

Penguin Villa (Thai: เพนกวินวิลล่า) is a one-man Thai pop band consisting of musician and producer Jettamon "Jay" Malayota (Thai: 'เจ' เจตมนต์ มละโยธา).

Jettamon started his music career when he was in his second bachelor years, as a guitarist for the alternative rock band Proud (พราว).

His song "Acrophobia" is featured in the 2010 film Uncle Boonmee Who Can Recall His Past Lives, directed by Apichatpong Weerasethakul, and he wrote the music for Proud's Ther Kue Kwam Fan (เธอคือความฝัน - "You Are My Dream"), which appeared in the soundtrack of Nicolas Winding Refn's 2013 film Only God Forgives.
