= Wouter Barendrecht =

Dutch film producer (1965–2009)

- Born: November 5, 1965; The Netherlands
- Died: April 5, 2009 (aged 43); Bangkok, Thailand
- Occupation: Film producer
- Years active: 1992–2009
- Known for: Founder of Fortissimo Films

Wouter Barendrecht (November 5, 1965, Amsterdam, The Netherlands – April 5, 2009, Bangkok, Thailand) was a film producer. With Michael J. Werner, Barendrecht was the co-chairman of Fortissimo Films, a company he founded in 1991 in Amsterdam.

Barendrecht worked as a programmer at the International Film Festival Rotterdam and as a press officer for the Berlin International Film Festival. A member of the European Film Academy, he frequently served on the juries of international film festivals.

From 1997 until his death, he was based in Hong Kong and was one of the two people who re-vitalised the Hong Kong Lesbian & Gay Film Festival in 2000. He died on April 5, 2009, of cardiac arrest in Bangkok, where he was there for meetings.

== Filmography ==
Credits as either executive producer or producer

- The Goddess of 1967 (2000)
- Tsui Hark's Vampire Hunters (2002)
- Bear's Kiss (2002)
- Springtime in a Small Town (2002)
- Party Monster (2003)
- 16 Years of Alcohol (2003)
- The Tulse Luper Suitcases, Part 1: The Moab Story (2003)
- Last Life in the Universe (2003)
- The Tulse Luper Suitcases: Antwerp (2003)
- The Tulse Luper Suitcases, Part 3: From Sark to the Finish
- Grimm (2003)
- P.S. (2004)
- Mysterious Skin (2004)
- The Night Listener (2006)
- Invisible Waves (2006)
- When the Road Bends… Tales of a Gypsy Caravan (2006)
- Shortbus (2006)
- Syndromes and a Century (2006)
- I Don't Want to Sleep Alone (2006)
- Waiter (2006)
- Getting Home (2007)
- The Home Song Stories (2007)
- Ploy (2007)
- Pleasure Factory (2007)
- Country Wedding (2008)
- Life During Wartime (2008)
- Black Oasis (2008)
