= Fortissimo Films =

Dutch entertainment company

- Type: Subsidiary
- Industry: Motion pictures
- Founded: 1991
- Founder: Wouter Barendrecht
- Headquarters: Amsterdam, Netherlands
- Key people: Clement Magar (GM) Gabrielle Rozing (GM)
- Products: Film production, sales and distribution
- Owner: Alibaba Group (30%)
- Parent: Isabella Films International B.V. (2016-2017); Hehe Pictures (2017-present) backed 30% by Alibaba Group (some majority of assets)
- Website: www.fortissimofilms.com

Fortissimo Films is a Dutch entertainment company specializing in the production, presentation, promotion and distribution of feature films, founded in 1991 with offices in Amsterdam. The company is owned by Hehe Pictures since 2017 while Isabella International B.V. only owned a few assets and the name until 2017.

Fortissimo Films' library includes feature films, feature-length documentaries, animated films, and short subjects. The company represents over 100 films from every corner of the globe. These included features by Wong Kar Wai (2046, Chungking Express, In the Mood For Love); Martin Scorsese (Shine a Light); John Cameron Mitchell (Shortbus); Jim Jarmusch (Coffee And Cigarettes, Mystery Train); Iwai Shunji (Love Letter, Hana & Alice); Pen-ek Ratanaruang (6ixtynin9, Nymph); Tsai Ming-Liang (I Don't Want to Sleep Alone, What Time is it There?); Diao Yinan (Black Coal, Thin Ice), and Tian Zhuangzhuang (The Blue Kite, Springtime in a Small Town) and more recently films by ZHANG Yang (Up The Mountain, The Sound of Dali), ZHANG Chong (Super Me, The Fourth Wall) and LIU Fendou (The Heart).

Fortissimo's documentaries include Morgan Spurlock's Super Size Me; Andrew Jarecki's Capturing the Friedmans; Sydney Pollack's Sketches of Frank Gehry; Julian Schnabel's Berlin; Tamra Davis's Jean-Michel Basquiat: The Radiant Child; and Kevin Macdonald's Marley.

Additionally, the catalogue features a range of works by directors comprising Gregg Araki, Sergei Bodrov, Fruit Chan, Peter Greenaway, Hou Hsiao-hsien, Kore-eda Hirokazu, Kurosawa Kiyoshi, Richard Linklater, Mira Nair, the Pang Brothers, Park Chanwook, Paul Schrader, Todd Solondz, Béla Tarr, Tsui Hark, Wang Xiaoshuai, Zhang Yang, Zhang Yuan and many other acclaimed filmmakers.

Fortissimo also manages existing libraries on behalf of independent producers and directors, such as Wong Kar Wai's Jet Tone, Killer Films, Hart Sharp Entertainment and directors Jim Jarmusch, Hal Hartley and Alex van Warmerdam.

Approximately 15 films per year are added to the lineup. Upcoming titles include Love After Love by Ann Hui.

On August 17, 2016, after more than 20 years in international distribution, the company filed for bankruptcy in the Netherlands.

The company has restarted business in 2017 under new management.

== Selected Fortissimo filmography ==
- Love After Love (2020)
- Vortex (2019)
- Super Me (2019)
- Up the Mountain (2018)
- Wrath of Silence (2017)
- Accused (2014)
- Another Me (2014)
- Black Coal, Thin Ice (2014)
- Ghadi (2014)
- Camera (2014)
- The Great Hypnotist (2014)
- iNumber Number (2014)
- Love Is Strange (2014)
- The Midnight After (2014)
- Unfriend (2014)
- Djinn (2013)
- Borgman (2013)
- Final Recipe (2013)
- Kiss The Water (2013)
- Linsanity (2013)
- Rigor Mortis (2013)
- Siddharth (2013)

Older titles

- Nymph (2009)
- Tokyo Sonata (2008)
- Mama's Boy (2007)
- Pleasure Factory (2007)
- The Home Song Stories (2007)
- Getting Home (2007)
- Shortbus (2006)
- The Night Listener (2006)
- Sunflower (2005)
- Mysterious Skin (2004)
- Party Monster (2003)
- The Era of Vampires (aka Vampire Hunters) (2003)
- Yes Nurse! No Nurse! (2002)
- Ken Park (2002)
- Little Tony (1998)
- The Dress (1996)
