= The Unseeable =

- The Thai movie poster.
- Directed by: Wisit Sasanatieng
- Written by: Kongkiat Khomsiri
- Produced by: Rewat Vorarat; Chareon Iamphungporn
- Starring: Supornthip Choungrangsee; Siraphun Wattanajinda
- Cinematography: Chankit Chanivikaipong
- Edited by: Patamanadda Yukol
- Music by: Wild at Heart
- Distributed by: Five Star Production
- Release dates: November 2, 2006 (Thailand); February 1, 2007 (Singapore and Malaysia)
- Running time: 100 minutes
- Country: Thailand
- Language: Thai
- Budget: US$2 million

The Unseeable (Thai: เปนชู้กับผี; RTGS: Pen Chu Kap Phi; literally "Committing Adultery with Ghost") is a 2006 Thai horror film directed by Wisit Sasanatieng. This is the first film of another writer's screenplay by the director. The writer is Kongkiat Khomsiri, one of the "Ronin Team" credited with directing the 2005 Thai horror film Art of the Devil 2.

== Plot ==
Set in 1934 Siam, the story involves a young pregnant woman named Nualjan who's searching for her missing husband. She comes to stay in the spooky rural mansion of a widow, Runjuan. The overgrown property is managed by the stern caretaker Somchit and inhabited by a number of other people, including another young woman, Choy, who becomes Nualjin's friend, as well as an old woman, a little girl and a man who is seen at the back of the property, digging a hole.

== Cast ==
- Supornthip Choungrangsee as Runjuan (RTGS: Ranchuan)
- Siraphun Wattanajinda as Nualjan (RTGS: Nuanchan)
- Tassawan Seneewongse as Somchit
- Wisa Kongka as Choy (RTGS: Choi)

== Origins ==
The Unseeable marks a change for Wisit Sasanatieng, who made his mark with the colourful western, Tears of the Black Tiger and the romantic-comedy, Citizen Dog. With his third film, Wisit was restrained by budgetary concerns from the stylizations of his first two films, but in doing so he was able to make it an homage to films of the 1930s and the stars of that era, including Bette Davis and Joan Crawford. Thai pop culture influences come from illustrator Hem Vejakorn, who wrote a series of 10-satang graphic novel ghost stories in the 1930s and '40s. The reference was so striking that the Barom Khru Foundation, which claims to supervise Hem's works, issued a statement warning Five Star Production to not violate the copyright of Hem's work. However, Wisit said the film was not an adaptation of any of Hem's works but was generally inspired by Hem's style.

== Reception ==
=== Festivals and awards ===
- 2007 Brussels International Festival of Fantasy Film
- 2007 Bangkok International Film Festival (ASEAN competition)
- 2007 Cinemanila International Film Festival
- 2007 Taipei Golden Horse Film Festival – NETPAC Award
