= Hem Vejakorn =

Thai artist and writer (1904–1969)

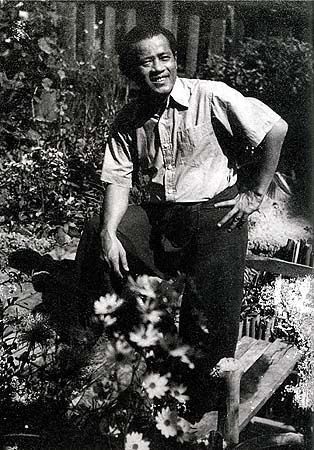
- Born: Hem (Note: At that time, Thais did not have surnames.); January 17, 1904; Phra Nakhon, Bangkok, Thailand
- Died: April 16, 1969 (aged 65); Thon Buri, Bangkok
- Known for: Illustration, painting
- Spouse: Chaemchuen Khomkham

Mom Luang Hem Vejakorn (Thai: เหม เวชกร; RTGS: Hem Wetchakon; January 17, 1904, Phra Nakhon, Bangkok – April 16, 1969, Thon Buri, Bangkok) was a Thai artist and writer. He is best known for his illustrations for the covers of 10-satang pulp novels, which have in turn influenced subsequent generations of Thai artists and illustrators, and also his ghost stories. It is estimated that he produced more than 50,000 pieces of art, including pen and pencil drawings, watercolors, posters and oil paintings. He portrayed rural life, Thai history and figures from Thai classical literature. His works have been reproduced on Thai postage stamps and featured in art galleries.

== Early life ==
Hem was born in Bangkok. At age 11, he took up residence with his uncle, Mom Rajawongse Daeng Dinakara, an architect in charge of supervising the Italian artists and architects employed in the building of Ananta Samakhom Throne Hall. Hem was then acquainted with artist Carlo Rigoli, architect Mario Tamagno and engineer Emilio Giovanni Gollo. Hem found himself drawn to the work in the Throne Hall, and Rigoli, who was the interior designer, allowed him to carry the paint.

Rigoli invited Hem to study in Italy, but the young man could not take the offer. Later, Hem was enrolled at Assumption College, Debsirin School and Poh Chang College. He finished at none of those institutions. Authorities attributed his academic failure to a lack of parental care.

But Hem continued his artistic endeavors. He helped with the painting of another temple, Wat Raja Oros, he started writing and learned to play the viola. He worked for a while for the royal irrigation department in Saraburi Province and was a steam engine mechanic.

He later began work in a printing house and turned to painting and preparing illustrations that he sold to magazines.

== Emerald Buddha temple renovation ==
In 1930 Hem was selected as one of the artists to renovate the murals in Wat Phra Kaew (the Emerald Buddha temple) during Bangkok’s 150th anniversary celebrations. He was responsible for renovating murals in room 69, which depicts a scene from the Ramayana of Phra Rama killing Mangkorn Kan.

After the work was complete, Hem and some friends set up the Ploenchit publishing house, which printed a series of 10-satang graphic novels between 1932 and 1935. Featuring illustrations by Hem, the novels were a hit and have since become collector's items.

In 1936, Hem opened his own publishing house called Hem Party, which published Phae Kao, written by Mai Muangderm and illustrated by Hem. Despite his success, Hem's business went broke, forcing the artist to seek work for the Pramuan Wan daily newspaper and the weekly journal Pramuan Sarn, both of which were owned by Prince Bidyalongkorn, who wrote under the pseudonym "Nor Mor Sor". Hem also illustrated such literary works as Khun Chang Khun Phaen and Sri Thanonchai.

== Revered teacher ==
During the Second World War, Hem worked for the Plaek Phibunsongkhram government, producing nationalist propaganda illustrations for textbooks. When the war ended he went back to freelancing and wrote an illustrated series of ghost stories, inspiring many Thai artists. Among students who sought him out was cartoonist Payut Ngaokrachang.

Among Hem's works is An Introduction to Phra Aphai Mani, a 1952 English-language book by Prem Chaya (Prince Prem Purachatra) and illustrated by Hem. It serves as an introduction to the epic poem by Thai writer Sunthorn Phu. His old student Payut would go on to create Thailand's first cel-animated feature film, The Adventure of Sudsakorn, based on Sunthorn Phu's work. Another famous Thai epic poem, The Story of Khun Chang Khun Phaen, was also translated by Prem Chaya and illustrated by Hem, in the 1950s. A series of Hem's illustrations for the poem Lilit Phra Lo was published in 1963.

Much later, film director Wisit Sasanatieng paid tribute to Hem's ghost stories with his 2006 film, The Unseeable. The Barom Khru Foundation, which claims to supervise Hem's works, issued a statement warning the film's producer Five Star Production not to violate the copyright of Hem's writing. The director countered that The Unseeable was not an adaptation but was generally inspired by Hem's style of writing and illustrations.

Before his death in 1969, Hem was engaged by King Bhumibol Adulyadej to create oil paintings that would be given as gifts to royal visitors.
