= Siripan Techajindawong =

Thai writer

Siripun Taechachiadawong (born 1966) is a Thai writer who writes under the pen name Koynuch.

Her works include the children's book, The Little Garuda, which won honorable mention for children's books in the 2002 Nai Indra Awards. She also wrote the novel, Mah Nakorn, which was adapted into the 2004 film, Citizen Dog, by her husband, Wisit Sasanatieng. Siripun also wrote the novelization of her husband's first film, Fah Talai Jone, or Tears of the Black Tiger. She won a Phra Suraswadee ("Golden Doll") film award for best song from the Entertainment News Reporters Association of Thailand for her arrangement of the traditional song, "Kamsuanjan" ("The Moon Lament") in Tears of the Black Tiger.

Siripun graduated in journalism and mass communications from Thammasat University and took a job as a copywriter for advertising agencies in Thailand. She continues to work as a copywriter as her main source of income, in between writing books.

"If I had a choice, I'd just be a writer," she said in a 2007 interview. "On the one side, I write books to inspire people, to make them want to become better and to understand themselves. On the other side, I write ads to lure people to buy products."
