= Thunska Pansittivorakul =

Thai film director

Thunska Pansittivorakul (Thai: ธัญสก พันสิทธิวรกุล), born October 22, 1973, is a Thai independent film director.

== Biography ==
Thunska Pansittivorakul was born in Bangkok in 1973. He graduated from the Department of Art Education, Faculty of Education of Chulalongkorn University. He used to be a columnist of many magazines including Thai:Film Quarterly and a day. His short films, documentaries and feature films were screened in over 100 international film festivals, including Berlin International Film Festival, International Film Festival Rotterdam, Hong Kong International Film Festival, Toronto Reel Asian International Film Festival, etc.

He won the Grand Prize award at The 4th Taiwan International Documentary Festival 2004 for his documentary feature 'Happy Berry'. His 'Heartbreak Pavilion' project won the Top Award from Pusan Promotion Plan (PPP) at The 10th Pusan International Film Festival 2005. In 2007 during Thaksin Shinawatra's regime, he received the Silpathorn Award from The Ministry of Culture's Office of Contemporary Arts, which is awarded to one outstanding artist each year. The past honorees in the field of film include Pen-Ek Ratanaruang, Apichatpong Weerasethakul, Wisit Sasanatieng, etc. Thunska is a special instructor at Film Department of Bangkok University. He is currently penning columns for Bioscope magazine. In an interview, he discussed his decision to withhold his films from Thai release: "I decided not to show any of my films in Thailand."

== Filmography ==
=== Feature films ===
- Voodoo Girls (2002)
- Happy Berry (2004)
- This Area is under Quarantine (2009)
- Reincarnate (2010)
- The Terrorists (2011)
- Supernatural (2014)
- sPACEtIME (2015)
- I was Young? Ignorant? Curious! (2017)
- Homogeneous, Empty Time (2017)
- Nang Yai Now (2019)
- Santikhiri Sonata (2019)
- Avalon (2020)
- Danse Macabre (2021)
- Damnatio Memoriae (2023)
- Isan Odyssey (2025)

=== Short films ===
- Private Life (2000)
- Love Sickness (2000)
- ...for Shiw Ping 28/12/97 (2000)
- Sigh (2001)
- Chemistry (2003)
- Unseen Bangkok (2004)
- Vous vous soviens de moi? (2005)
- Life Show (2005)
- After Shock (2005, for Tsunami Digital Short Films project)
- Out of Control (2006)
- You Are Where I Belong To (2006)
- Middle-earth (2007)
- Action! (2008)
- Soak (2008)
- Screaming Goats (2018)
- Dance of Death (2021)

=== Music videos ===
- Blind Spot (2007, for Soundlanding)
