= Stella Malucchi =

Stella Malucchi (Thai: สเตลล่า มาลูกี้) is an Italian-Colombian former model and actress based in Thailand. Fluent in the Thai language, she has primarily worked in Thailand, and has acted in two films, Tears of the Black Tiger and Angulimala.

== Career ==
For her first film, Tears of the Black Tiger, she was spotted in a Thai music video by director Wisit Sasanatieng, who thought she would be perfect for the role of Rumpoey. Through make-up and costuming, Malucchi was transformed into a young, noble-born Thai woman in 1950s Thailand. She studied at Ruamrudee International School.

Stella fell ill one week after she gave birth to her son on January 2 and was admitted into hospital Oon January 24, 2010. After being directly admitted into ICU, she lost consciousness and lapsed into a coma. Tests revealed that she had hyperparathyroidism, a rare disease in which a defective parathyroid gland allows dangerously high calcium levels (hypercalcaemia). Being too weak for an operation to remove her parathyroid, she was placed on an artificial lung and heart machine. After five days and requiring dialysis several times a day, Stella showed signs of improvement. Unfortunately, complications soon developed. A restricted blood-flow to her right leg caused infection and an above-the-knee amputation was required. Soon after the removal of the leg, and with signs of infection having disappeared, Stella's parathyroid gland was then safely removed, ensuring her survival. Stella woke from the coma one month after she was admitted.

== Filmography ==
Year	Title	Role
2000	Tears of the Black Tiger	Rumpoey Prasit
2003	Angulimala	Nantha
