= 2007 Bangkok International Film Festival =

Edition of film festival

- The official festival poster.
- Opening film: Children of Glory
- Closing film: Muay Thai Chaiya
- Location: CentralWorld, Bangkok
- Awards: Golden Kinaree Award for Best Film: XXY
- Festival date: July 19 to July 29, 2007

The 2007 Bangkok International Film Festival was held from July 19 to July 29, 2007, at SF Group's SF World Cinema at CentralWorld. The fifth consecutive year for the festival, organizers planned a program of about 100 films, with an emphasis on Asian cinema.

== Scheduling, budgetary difficulties ==
Originally scheduled for January 26 to February 5, the festival was postponed because of a lack of available venues, since Bangkok cinemas at the time had planned to be fully booked with screenings of the part one of The Legend of King Naresuan.

In addition, the film festival organization was hit with a massive budget cut, from 180 million baht to 60 million baht, which resulted in festival organizers, the Tourism Authority of Thailand, having to break their contract with Los Angeles–based Film Festival Management, which had programmed the festival since 2004.

In previous years, the festival's focus had been on big-budget Hollywood films and lavish, red-carpet appearances by celebrities, flown to Bangkok at the festival's expense. With the budget cut and the focus on Asian films, the 2007 festival was expected to be a departure from past years.

== Controversy ==
The festival initially announced that the French-produced animated feature Persepolis would open the festival. The film is an adaptation of a graphic novel by Marjane Satrapi (who co-directed the film), telling the story of her childhood growing up in Iran during the Islamic Revolution. However, the Embassy of Iran asked the festival organizers to consider showing another film from Iran, so Persepolis was dropped from the program. The festival director, Chattan Kunjara Na Ayudhya, was quoted as saying:

I was invited by the Iranian embassy to discuss the matter and we both came to mutual agreement that it would be beneficial to both countries if the film was not shown. It's a good film, but there are other considerations.

We had a request from the Iranian Embassy that the film festival remove the film, and we did. Now we move on.

However, Chattan also said that the decision to cancel the film was his alone and that "there was no outside pressure".

The Hungarian film, Children of Glory, depicting the "Blood in the Water" Olympic water polo match and the Hungarian Revolution of 1956, was chosen as the replacement opening film.

== Program highlights ==
The festival's lineup featured a retrospective of films by Spanish director Luis Buñuel and a tribute to Indian actress Hema Malini. Malini was among the celebrities taking part in the festival's opening night festivities.

The main competition categories for the Golden Kinaree were for international films and ASEAN films from Southeast Asia, as well as an international short-film competition. Non-competition sections were for Thai Panorama (Thai films released in 2006 and 2007) Asian films, ASEAN films, documentaries and the wide-ranging Windows on the World.

The closing film was Muay Thai Chaiya, a Thai boxing drama film directed by Kongkiat Khomsiri.

== Competition ==
Competition trophies were given out in an awards banquet presided over by Princess Ubol Ratana in the World Ballroom in the Centara Grand and Bangkok Convention Centre at CentralWorld.

=== Golden Kinaree Awards ===
- Winner: XXY, directed by Lucía Puenzo (Argentina)
- Special jury award: Lost in Beijing, directed by Li Yu (China)
  - Beaufort, directed by Joseph Cedar (Israel)
  - Getting Home, directed by Zhang Yang (China/Hong Kong)
  - Ploy (uncensored version), directed by Pen-ek Ratanaruang (Thailand)
  - Sankara, directed by Prasanna Jayakody (Sri Lanka)
  - Spider Lilies, directed by Zero Chou (Taiwan)
  - The Edge of Heaven, directed by Fatih Akin (Turkey)
  - This Is England, directed by Shane Meadows (United Kingdom)

=== ASEAN competition ===
- Winner: Before We Fall in Love Again, directed by James Lee (Malaysia)
  - Alone, directed by Banjong Pisanthanakun and Parkpoom Wongpoom (Thailand)
  - Bangkok Time, directed by Santi Taepanich (Thailand)
  - Dancing Bells, directed by Deepak Kumaran Menon (Malaysia)
  - Koper (The Lost Suitcase), directed by Richard Oh (Indonesia)
  - Love for Share, directed by Nia Dinata (Indonesia)
  - Manoro, directed by Brillante Mendoza (Philippines)
  - Story of Pao, directed by Ngo Quang Hai (Vietnam)
  - The Bet Collector, directed by Jeffrey Jeturian (Philippines)
  - The Unseeable, directed by Wisit Sasanatieng (Thailand)

=== Lifetime Achievement Award ===
- Ray Harryhausen

=== Jameson International Short Films Award ===
- Winner: Eternally Yours, directed by Atsushi Ogata (Japan)
