= Monrak Transistor =

2001 film by Pen-Ek Ratanaruang

- Cover of the Thailand DVD release.
- Directed by: Pen-Ek Ratanaruang
- Written by: Pen-Ek Ratanaruang
- Based on: Mon Rak Transistor by Wat Wanlayangkoon
- Produced by: Charoen Iamphungporn; Duangkamol Limcharoen; Nonzee Nimibutr
- Starring: Supakorn Kitsuwon; Siriyakorn Pukkavesh
- Cinematography: Chankit Chamnivikaipong
- Edited by: Patamanadda Yukol
- Music by: Amornbhong Methakunavudh; Chartchai Pongprapapan; Suraphol Sombatcharoen (songs)
- Distributed by: Five Star Production
- Release date: 28 December 2001 (Thailand)
- Running time: 129 minutes
- Country: Thailand
- Language: Thai

Monrak Transistor (Thai: มนต์รักทรานซิสเตอร์, English: Transistor Love Story) is a 2001 Thai film directed by Pen-Ek Ratanaruang. Blending several genres, including comedy, romance, musical and crime, it is the story of a young man named Pan and his odyssey after he goes AWOL from the army and tries to make it as a luk thung singing star.

== Plot ==
The story begins in a jail, where a prisoner is being interrogated. The action is taking place in the background, behind bars and is blurred. The focus is on a bottle of laxative. Seems the prisoner has stolen a necklace and swallowed it. Soon, the necklace is passed. And it's not even real gold.

The old jailer picks up the story, saying the prisoner is a boy named Pan from his home village. Pan is a simple country boy. In the words of the jailer, he thinks about entertainment too much and is not respectful enough of his elders. In other words, he's not too bright. Yet, he is a good singer, and the story flashes back to a village fair, where he's up on stage singing his heart out, with his lyrics being composed on the spot and directed toward Sadao, a pretty village girl who is dancing in the crowd.

A local rich kid pulls up in his truck and asks Sadao to dance. Then, when the rich kid goes to the drinks stand, Pan hands his microphone over to another performer and moves to dance with Sadao. The rich kid returns, and Pan bumps into him, spilling the drinks. The rich guy, with his thuggish friends in tow, orders Pan to clean up the mess. Pan does so by spitting on the guy's shoes. A fight breaks out, but the music keeps going, with a guitarist picking up the beat and screaming a punk song as the fight intensifies.

Pan and Sadao retreat to Sadao's home, where Pan breaks into another song, expressing his love. But before long, Sadao's irascible father shows up with a shotgun, causing Pan to jump into the river to escape the shotgun blasts.

Pan is not easily deterred. Via his sister, he sends Sadao a pretty blue blouse, accompanied by a love note. He then shows up one day to dig a pond for Sadao's father, explaining that the man Sadao's father had originally hired was sick. He insists on calling the man Dad.

"Stop calling me Dad. When did I fuck your mother," the old man cruelly admonishes Pan.

The old man is complaining of various aches and pains. Pan offers to get him some folk medicine, something involving foot pollen, which because of the cultural association of the foot being the basest part of the body, gravely offends him. Pan is back in the doghouse with Sadao's father.

Yet the two become married. For a present, Pan presents Sadao with a new transistor radio. They have a baby on the way and they enjoy being together.

"The movie could end here," the narrator chimes in, "and you'd be heading for exits with a happy ending. But there is more to this sad tale."

Pan's run of bad luck starts when he draws the wrong number in the draft lottery and must enter the army. He heads off to basic training before his wife gives birth to their child. He promises to write her a letter every day.

A musical interlude depicts Pan and the other soldiers singing the mournful song "Mai Leum" ("Don't Forget) as they crawl on their backs in the mud under barbed wire, and during their haircuts.

One day Pan sees a poster for a singing contest and at the urging of his army buddies, he enters. He nervously gets up on stage and says he wants to sing "The Sad Soldier". The band doesn't know the tune, so Pan sings it a cappella. Though he wows the crowd, he faints onstage when the song is complete. Along with a local girl, Dao, Pan wins the contest and without giving thought to the consequences, he's on a bus headed for Bangkok, where he hopes to become a big singing star.

He ends up locked inside the music company's office, where he spends the night. The next day, he meets his new boss, a sleazy producer named Suwat, who insists Pan call him "Daddy". He lectures Pan about all the hard work he'll need to do before making it as a star.

Pan pitches in around the office, mopping floors, running errands, and sleeping in a storage closet, which he shares with Yen, an old man. Over a year passes with contest-winner Dao receiving voice training and Pan mopping. He grows closer to Dao. Meanwhile, Sadao is worn down raising the couple's child alone, without word from Pan. The radio she was given as a wedding present starts to wear out.

Finally, one night at a show, Pan gets his big break when the star male singer doesn't show up. Pan is hastily thrown into a gold lame tuxedo and pushed onstage.

What he doesn't know is that out in the crowd is Sadao and her father. They have finally tracked down Pan and have come to visit him. She's brought him bottles of rainwater from the village, figuring the water in the city is dirty and unfit to drink. Pan and Sadao enjoy a brief reunion after the show, but Pan is quickly whisked away by Suwat, to Suwat's home, which is decorated with animal skins.

Suwat tells Pan to relax and goes to change. He comes out with some beers, wearing just a silk bathrobe and his underwear. Suwat puts on a porn tape – it's a film of the girl singer, Dao. Suwat tells Pan to strip and has him pose for photos. Suwat becomes bolder and bolder, and eventually sexually assaults Pan. Pan reacts in surprise and confusion, pushing Suwat off of him. Suwat lands on a glass table and is killed.

Pan runs out into the street. He sees a policeman. Now, not only is he AWOL from the army, he's also a murderer. He then spots a truck loaded down with other men, so he hops aboard, hoping to hop back off when the truck stops. But the truck doesn't stop until it's taken Pan to a remote sugar cane plantation, where he's set to work cutting cane in torturous conditions.

Meanwhile, back in the village, a smooth-talking travelling salesman, peddling deworming medicine from his boat, is passing through. He's taken a liking to Sadao, giving her some medicine for her sick baby and inviting her to a movie screening that night. He further charms her at the screening, by demonstrating his talents as a film dubber, improvising lines to tell her how beautiful she is.

Back on the sugar-cane plantation, the workers, tired of their diet of vegetables and rice, are restive. Pan has made friends with one of the workers, Siew, but Pan is also well liked by the tough boss, Yot. One night at a card game, Yot finds that Siew has won all his money. A fight breaks out. There is running through the jungle. Dead bodies are uncovered. The horror! Pan and Siew keep running, and eventually wind up in the city.

Starving and in ragged clothes, they happen upon a luxury hotel where they see beggars, street cleaners and motorcycle taxi drivers, fellow lower class people, being ushered in, Pan and Siew walk in and start helping themselves to the buffet, shoving food into their pockets. It is revealed that the occasion was a charity ball where the elite are dress up as the poor, and Pan and Siew win the prize for most authentic costume. But when all the food in their pockets is discovered, they are kicked out of the hotel.

Desperate for money, Pan and Siew hatch another plan. Siew snatches a woman's necklace, and, as she chases him, he passes it Pan, who is then chased by the police. Eventually Pan is caught, and this brings the story back to where it started in the jail.

Pan ends up serving two years in prison, where he and the other inmates work on the prison farm, fertilizing crops with their own feces and urine. While dipping a bucket into the sewage well, Pan falls in, and is covered in the brown substance.

On his release, Pan waits on the street for a ride. A truck pulls up. It is Siew, who is wearing a track suit and much jewelry and is carrying a cellular phone. With his hair dyed blond, he calls himself Peter and announces he is now a drug dealer, and has made quick money. And, to add more indignity to the situation, he's married a former singing star and porn actress - Dao.

Finally, Pan returns to Sadao. She looks more careworn than ever. In addition to a little boy, there's an infant in a crib. "Whose kid is that?" Pan asks when he sees the younger baby. "His father was a dog," she explains. "They are all dogs." Pan looks around. A photo of Sadao's father is on the wall. He's died. The transistor radio lies in a corner, broken and covered with dust. The pretty blue blouse is faded and stained and crumpled on the floor in another corner.

There's a final musical reprise of "Mai Leum", with all the characters in the film putting in an appearance to sing the chorus. Sadao reluctantly accepts Pan back into her life, and breaks down, weeping profusely as the couple embraces.

== Cast ==
- Supakorn Kitsuwon as Pan
- Siriyakorn Pukkavesh as Sadao
- Black Phomtong as Yot
- Somlek Sakdikul as Suwat
- Porntip Papanai as Dao
- Ampon Rattanawong as Siew
- Prasit Wongrakthai as Sadaw's father
- Chartchai Hamnuansak as the old prison guard
- Ackarat Nitipol as Kiattisak
- Sawang Rodnuch as Yen
- Ornnapa Krissadee as the charity ball announcer

== Festivals and awards ==
The film was Thailand's official entry for the Academy Award for Best Foreign Language Film in 2002. It was the first Thai film selected for the Directors' Fortnight at the Cannes Film Festival, where it screened in 2002. Awards include:

- 2002 Asia-Pacific Film Festival
  - Best actor, Supakorn Kitsuwon
  - Best Sound
- 2002 Seattle International Film Festival
  - Asian Trade Winds Award
- 2002 Thailand National Film Awards
  - Best actress, Siriyakorn Pukkavesh
  - Best picture, Cinemasia
  - Best screenplay, Pen-Ek Ratanaruang
- 2002 Vienna International Film Festival
  - Reader Jury of the Standard
- 2009 International Film Festival of Kerala
- 2026 25th New York Asian Film Festival

== Television adaptation ==
In 2018, GMM25 made a television adaptation with 26 episodes. It was directed by Chookiat Sakveerakul, and starred Pusin Warinruk and Focus Jirakul.

== Trivia ==
- The film is dedicated to luk thung singer Suraphol Sombatcharoen (1930–1968), who wrote the song "Mai Leum" ("Don't Forget").
- The western screened by the traveling medicine show was Tears of the Black Tiger, a 2000 Thai film by Wisit Sasanatieng and co-starring Monrak Transistor star Supakorn Kitsuwon.

== Sources ==
- Stephens, Chuck (May 30, 2003) "Songs and snake oil". The Guardian.
