= One Night Husband =

2003 film directed by Pimpaka Towira

- The Thai theatrical poster.
- Directed by: Pimpaka Towira
- Written by: Laddawan Ratanadilokchai; Pimpaka Towira; Prabda Yoon
- Produced by: Mingmonkul Sonakul; Paiboon Damrongchaitham; Boosaba Daoruang
- Starring: Nicole Theriault; Siriyakorn Pukkavesh
- Cinematography: Christoph Janetzko
- Edited by: Lee Chatametikool
- Music by: Kasemson Brahmasubha
- Production company: GMM Pictures
- Distributed by: GDH 559
- Release date: 1 August 2003
- Running time: 96 minutes
- Country: Thailand
- Language: Thai

One Night Husband (Thai: คืนไร้เงา or Kuen rai ngao) is a 2003 Thai thriller film directed by Pimpaka Towira and co-written by Pimpaka and Prabda Yoon. It was the debut feature film for Pimpaka, an independent film director and one of the few female directors working in the Thai film industry. One Night Husband was also the film debut of Thai-Canadian pop singer Nicole Theriault.

== Plot ==
On her first night with her husband, newlywed Sipang's husband Napat takes a mysterious phone call and then leaves. When he doesn't return, Sipang asks her new brother-in-law, Chatchai, to help. Joining Sipang in her search is Chatchai's timid wife Busaba. As the search for Napat drags on, Sipang uncovers some disturbing things about her husband's past.

== Cast ==
- Nicole Theriault as Sipang
- Siriyakorn Pukkavesh as Bussaba
- Pongpat Wachirabunjong as Chatchai
- Woravit Kaewphet as Napat
- Piathip Khumwong as Bussaba's Mother
- Kowit Wattanakul as Hieng

== Reception ==
One Night Husband premiered at the Berlin Film Festival in 2003 and was screened at several other film festivals in 2003, including the Deauville Asian Film Festival, Hong Kong International Film Festival, Singapore International Film Festival, CINEFAN Film Festival, Fukuoka Asian Film Festival, Pusan International Film Festival and the Stockholm International Film Festival.
