= Supakorn Kitsuwon =

Thai actor (born 1972)

Suppakorn Kitsuwan
- ศุภกรณ์ กิจสุวรรณ
- Born: December 28, 1972 (age 53); Sawang Arom, Uthai Thani, Thailand
- Other name: Tok (ต๊อก)
- Education: Amnuay Silpa School; Dhurakij Pundit University
- Occupations: Actor; dancer
- Years active: 1990s–present
- Known for: Dang Bireley's and Young Gangsters

Supakorn Kitsuwon (Thai: ศุภกรณ์ กิจสุวรรณ, RTGS: Suphakon Kitsuwan; born 28 December 1972), nicknamed Tok (Thai: ต๊อก), is a Thai film and stage actor. He starred as Pan in Monrak Transistor and Khun Krabi in SARS Wars. He had supporting roles in Tears of the Black Tiger, as Mahesuan, and in Dang Bireley's and Young Gangsters, as Pu Bottlebomb.

Kitsuwon graduated from Amnuay Silpa School and a diploma from Canada. He entered show business in the early 1990s as a model and backup dancer for singer and rapper Jetrin Wattanasin.

== Filmography ==
=== Films ===
- Dang Bireley's and Young Gangsters (1997) as Pu Bottlebomb
- Crime Kings (1998)
- Extra Legal (1999)
- Tears of the Black Tiger (2000) as Mahesuan
- The Legend of Suriyothai (2001) as Sir Sriyod
- Monrak Transistor (2001) as Phaen (Pan)
- Goodman Town (2002)
- Ukkabat (The Meteor) (2004) - Oam
- SARS Wars (2004) - Khun Krabii
- Perfect Killer (2005) as Kieb
- Rambo (2008) as Myint
- Busaba Bold and Beautiful (Suay Sing Krating Sab) (2008) as Pod
- Art of the Devil 3 (Llong khong 2) (2008) as Dis
- Queens of Langkasuka (Puen yai jom salad) (2008) as Chief of Yahol Pirates
- Ong Bak 2 (2008) as Master Armer
- Young Bao the Movie (2013) as Thanis
- Adam (2017)
- The 400 Bravers (2018)
- SisterS (2019) as Sing
- Khun Phaen Begins (2019) as Master Det
- Low Season (2020)
- Bangkok Breaking: Heaven and Hell (2024) as Shopper

=== Television dramas ===
- 2000 Mae Nak Phra Khanong as Mak
- 2001 Keuy Ban Nok as Kamnuan Lhaopana
- 2002 Winyarn Hansa
- 2003 Saming Baan Rai as Saming Baan Rai
- 2003 Pleng Ruk Pleng Puern as Sommai / Chaitae
- 2008 Choom Tang Seur Phen
- 2009 Thepabut Chood Win
- 2010 Sai Soke
- 2010 The Seven Fighters (2010) as Chuk Biaosakun
- 2010 หัวใจรักข้ามภพ
- 2012 Meu Prab Por Look Orn
- 2012 แม่แตงร่มใบ as Songchai
- 2013 บ่วงบาป as Nai Som
- 2014 Koom Nang Kruan as Thenkraam
- 2015 Patiharn Ruk Karn Kob Fah as Moya
- 2015 Krasue Mahanakorn
- 2016 มือปราบสายเดี่ยว
- 2016 Padiwarada as White Tiger
- 2016 กาลครั้งหนึ่งในหัวใจ as Thian-Kong
- 2017 เชลยศึก as Chai
- 2017 Mue Nuer Mek as Yai
- 2019 Bai Mai Tee Plid Plew as Pornchai
- 2020 สัญญารัก สัญญาณลวง
- 2020 Soot Rak Sap E-Lee as Anawat Thanapongpat
- 2020 Singha Na Ka
- 2022 Khru Ma as Headmaster
- 2022 My Lovely Bodyguard as Dech (Sergeant)
- 2023 Nang Nak Saphai Phra Khanong as Moen Wai Phanuphab
- 2023 Pah Nang Suer as Saeng
- 2023 Luert Chao Phraya as Sua Hian
- 2023 Wongsakanayat as Sangha
- 2023 My Undercover Chef

=== Television series ===
- 2022 Astrophile as Nubdao's father
- 2022 Thai Cave Rescue Saman Kunan (Sam)

=== Television sitcom ===
- 2011 ผู้กองเจ้าเสน่ห์

=== Mc ===
Television

- 2014 Muay Duang 8 Thid
