= Siriyakorn Pukkavesh =

Thai actress

Siriyakorn Pukkavesa
- สิริยากร พุกกะเวส
- Born: June 13, 1974 (age 51); Samut Prakan Province, Thailand
- Other names: Oom (อุ้ม); Siriyakorn Pookawes; Siriyakorn Pukkaves
- Occupations: Actress; model; presenter; designer; publisher
- Years active: 1994–present
- Spouse: Christopher Marquardt (m. 2011)
- Children: 2
- Awards: Thailand National Film Association Awards 2001; Best Actress: Monrak Transistor
- Website: Official website

Siriyakorn "Oom" Pukkavesa (Thai: สิริยากร พุกกะเวส; RTGS: Siriyakon Phukkawet, born June 13, 1974, in Samut Prakan Province, Thailand) is a Thai actress, model, presenter, designer and magazine publisher. She is best known by her nickname, Oom (อุ้ม).

== Life ==
Pukkavesa was born in 1974 in Samut Prakan Province. She is a graduate of Chulalongkorn University's Faculty of Communication Arts, majoring in advertising.

Her break-out film role was as the lead actress in Monrak Transistor, a 2001 comedy-drama film by Pen-Ek Ratanaruang. She was named Best Actress at the Thailand National Film Association Awards for her role. Monrak Transistor was the first Thai film selected for the Directors' Fortnight at the Cannes Film Festival, where it screened in 2002.

She then co-starred in the 2003 psychological thriller, One Night Husband.

Other film roles include starring in The Adventures of Iron Pussy, co-directed by Apichatpong Weerasethakul, and in the Thai independent short film, Bicycles & Radios. She has also acted in numerous lakorns (Thai soap operas).

Since 2003, Siriyakorn has embarked on a career in business, producing her own lifestyle variety TV show 'Baanoom' (บ้านอุ้ม), creating her own line of kitchen utensils and publishing a self-titled lifestyle magazine and books, Oom.

She was married to Christopher Marquardt in 2011, and then moved to Portland, Oregon, in 2012. She has 2 daughters, Metta and Annika. She is now an author at The Cloud online magazine.

== Filmography ==
Year	Title	Role
1999	Cloning	May
2001	Monrak Transistor	Sadao
2003	One Night Husband	Bussaba
2003	The Adventure of Iron Pussy	Rungranee
2004	Bicycles & Radios	Dao

== Thai drama ==
Year	Title	Role
1994	Sam Bai Mai Thao	An-tra
1994	Rom Chat	Bang-Earn
1998	Dao Rueng	Daorueng
1999	Jintapatee	Jintapatee (Mao)

== Awards ==
- 1995 - 10th Golden Television Awards, Rom Chat
- 1999 - 23rd Saraswati Awards, Best Upcoming Actress, Cloning
- 2001 - Thailand National Film Association Awards, Best Actress, Monrak Transistor
- 2002 - 26rd Saraswati Awards, Best Actress, Monrak Transistor
