= Lalita Panyopas =

Thai actress (born 1971)

- ลลิตา ปัญโญภาส
- Born: Lalita Chotiros; 5 October 1971 (age 54); Bangkok, Thailand
- Other names: Mew (หมิว); Lalita Sasiprapha
- Education: Srinakharinwirot University; University of Middlesex
- Occupations: Actress; model
- Known for: Prisana in Prisana; Tum in Ruang Talok 69; Dang in Ploy; Mathuson in La (2017)
- Height: 1.69 m (5 ft 6 1/2 in)
- Spouse: Narabadi Sasiprapha (m. 2001–2016)
- Children: 2
- Parent: Charuwan Panyopas

Lalita Panyopas (Thai: ลลิตา ปัญโญภาส, RTGS: Lalita Panyophat, nickname Mew (Thai: หมิว; RTGS: Mio), born 5 October 1971) is a Thai film and television actress. She appeared in the films 6ixtynin9 and Ploy.

== Career ==
Lalita made a string of feature films in the late 1980s and also was the lead actress in many Thai soap in the late 1980s to early 2000s. Her breakthrough came with the 1987 period drama Prisana on Ch3, which truly put her name on the map. Her most prominent film role was as Tum, the unlucky central character in Pen-Ek Ratanaruang's 1999 film Ruang Talok 69. In 2007, she was reunited with Pen-Ek, starring in Ploy, which was screened in the Director's Fortnight at the 2007 Cannes Film Festival.

== Personal life ==
She received higher education at Triam Udom Suksa School and a bachelor's degree from the Faculty of Education, Srinakharinwirot University. She has a master's degree in interior design from University of Middlesex, United Kingdom.

Lalita is married to a police officer of the Royal Thai Police named Narabadi Sasiprapha. They have two children, both boys, Sasidej (Plankton) and Sakdidej (Eton) Sasiprapha.
