= Ruang Talok 69 =

Ruang Talok 69 (6ixtynin9)
- The Thai movie poster.
- Directed by: Pen-Ek Ratanaruang
- Written by: Pen-Ek Ratanaruang
- Produced by: Pen-Ek Ratanaruang
- Starring: Lalita Panyopas
- Cinematography: Chankit Chamnivikaipong
- Edited by: Patamanadda Yukol
- Music by: Paibuljkiat Kheokao
- Distributed by: Five Star Production
- Release date: 19 November 1999
- Running time: 118 minutes
- Country: Thailand
- Language: Thai

Ruang Talok 69 (Thai: เรื่องตลก 69, English: 6ixtynin9 or A Funny Story About 6 and 9), is a 1999 Thai black comedy crime film written and directed by Pen-Ek Ratanaruang. It is the second feature film by the Thai writer-director. It stars Lalita Panyopas, a popular star of Thai soap operas.

== Plot ==
Tum is a secretary working for a bank which is forced to shed staff. As the boss cannot bear to select which people to fire, he uses the Kau Cim to determine who must leave. Tum draws one of the unlucky numbers. Back at her apartment building, she finds the elevator is out of order and is somewhat bothered by a young man who is a little too helpful. She is nonetheless accommodating and friendly. Once alone, though, she envisions all kinds of suicidal scenarios, including drinking household cleaning chemicals or blowing her head off with a handgun.

Her luck changes for the weirder the next morning when she discovers an instant noodle box in front of her door. It is filled with 500 baht bills. Apparently it has been left there because the number on her apartment door, 6, is missing a nail, so it flips upside down, making it appear she lives in apartment 9, which is actually down the hall. Soon after, a couple of thugs from a Muay Thai camp ask her if she has seen the box. They force their way into her flat, only to be killed accidentally.

Tum decides to get rid of their bodies, get a plane ticket, obtain a fake passport and visa, take the noodle box with her and go spend the rest of her life somewhere else. But the gangster, Kanjit, who makes fake passports happens to be the very guy she must stay away from. More men sent by a Muay Thai promoter appear at Tum's apartment, where one quickly hides in her wardrobe when she returned home. A young policeman, the lover of her nosy neighbor Pen, suddenly calls on her and discovers the bodies. The hidden man attracts the policeman's attention when he cocks his gun, and the subsequent firefight kills them both.

As Tum tries to hide the two bodies, Pen comes to visit, believing the policeman is still in her home. Another man arrives at the apartment later looking for the missing men, and mistakenly thinks he has killed the policeman after firing into the cop's body, which was hidden behind a door. As Tum tries to clean up the mess and hide the cop's body later, Pen and other neighbours spy on her through the keyhole and mistakenly believe she is having an affair with the policeman. Pen thinks of ways to figure out what Tum is doing, and ends up speculating the worst about her.

There is also Tum's friend Jim, who is distraught over her boyfriend cheating on her. Tum takes Jim with her to get her passport, and Jim accidentally gets caught in the crossfire. Jim, now dead, has been compromised and Tum makes off with the money. Tum remembers when Pen told her about how bodies were dumped in the lake and whatever goes down there disappears. She therefore dumps the money in, escaping with just guilt.

== Cast ==
- Lalita Panyopas as Tum
- Black Phomtong as Kanjit
- Tasanawalai Ongarittichai as Jim
- Sirisin Siripornsmathikul as Pen

== Reception ==
On the review aggregator website Rotten Tomatoes, 94% of 17 critics' reviews are positive, with an average rating of 6.6/10. Metacritic, which uses a weighted average, assigned the film a score of 65 out of 100, based on 8 critics, indicating "generally favorable" reviews.

== Remake ==
A television remake, 6ixtynin9: The Series, premiered on Netflix in 2023. Davika Hoorne stars as Toom.
