= Fun Bar Karaoke =

- Theatrical release poster
- Directed by: Pen-Ek Ratanaruang
- Written by: Pen-Ek Ratanaruang
- Produced by: Dhiranan Sukwibul
- Starring: Ray MacDonald; Champagne X
- Cinematography: Chankit Chamnivikaipong
- Edited by: Adrian Brady; Patamanadda Yukol
- Music by: Amornbhong Methakunavudh
- Distributed by: Five Star Production
- Release date: 27 August 1997
- Running time: 103 minutes
- Country: Thailand
- Language: Thai

Fun Bar Karaoke (Thai: ฝันบ้าคาราโอเกะ or Fan ba karaoke, literally "dream crazy karaoke") is a 1997 crime-comedy directed by Pen-Ek Ratanaruang. The film had its world premiere at the 1997 Berlin Film Festival for which Pen-Ek was credited as "Tom Pannet". It screened in the festival's Forum section.

== Plot ==
Pu is a young woman who is having some bad dreams. Her father, meanwhile, has fallen in love with a karaoke bar hostess girl named Yok who's the girlfriend of a mobster. A hitman named Noi is then dispatched to kill the father, and Pu ends up falling in love with Noi.

== Cast ==
- Fay Atsawet as Pu
- Ray MacDonald as Noi
- Champagne X as Yok
- Phaibunkiat Khiaogao as Pu's Father
