= Tears of the Black Tiger =

2000 film

- The Thai movie poster.
- Directed by: Wisit Sasanatieng
- Written by: Wisit Sasanatieng
- Produced by: Pracha Maleenont; Brian L. Marcar; Adirek Wattaleela; Nonzee Nimibutr
- Starring: Chartchai Ngamsan; Stella Malucchi; Supakorn Kitsuwon; Sombat Metanee
- Cinematography: Nattawut Kittikhun
- Edited by: Dusanee Puinongpho
- Music by: Amornbhong Methakunavudh
- Distributed by: Five Star Production
- Release dates: September 28, 2000 (Thailand); January 12, 2007 (U.S.)
- Running time: 110 minutes
- Country: Thailand
- Language: Thai

Tears of the Black Tiger (Thai: ฟ้าทะลายโจร, or Fa Thalai Chon, literally, "the heavens strike the thief") is a 2000 Thai action-adventure film written and directed by Wisit Sasanatieng. The story of a tragic romance between Dum, a fatalistic, working-class hero, who has become an outlaw, and Rumpoey, the upper-class daughter of a provincial governor, it is equal parts homage to and parody of Thai action films and romantic melodramas of the 1950s and 1960s.

The film was the first from Thailand to be selected for competition at the 2001 Cannes Film Festival, where it was critically hailed. It was screened at several other film festivals in 2001 and 2002, including the Vancouver International Film Festival, where it won the Dragons and Tigers Award for Best New Director. It also won many awards in Thailand for production and costume design, special effects and soundtrack.

Critics have noted the film's stylized use of color and conspicuous violence, and have compared it to the Revisionist Westerns of Sergio Leone and Sam Peckinpah. It has also been compared to the works of such directors as Douglas Sirk, John Woo, Jean-Luc Godard, Sam Raimi and Quentin Tarantino.

Miramax Films purchased the film for distribution in multiple regions including the United States, but changed the ending and then shelved it indefinitely. In 2006, the distribution rights were obtained by Magnolia Pictures, which screened the original version of the film in a limited release from January to April 2007 in several US cities.

== Plot ==
An elegant young woman carries a suitcase through the rain to wait in an ornate gazebo on a lotus swamp. She gazes at a photo of the man for whom she waits.

The young man, whose name is Dum, is with another gunman named Mahesuan, who defies Yoi, an enemy of their boss Fai, to come out of a house. Dressed all in black and wearing a cowboy hat, Dum charges through a hail of bullets into the house and out-shoots eight of Yoi's men. Dum fires his revolver, and the bullet ricochets around the room before drilling into a man's forehead. A red title card then flashes up and says: "Did you catch that? If not, we'll play it again!" And the shot is replayed in slow motion, showing the bullet bouncing off items in a Rube Goldberg fashion.

Dum and Mahesuan finish off Yoi, and then Dum rushes away on his own, galloping his white horse across open country. However, by the time Dum reaches the gazebo, the woman, Rumpoey Rajasena, has returned home. The next day she is formally engaged to the ambitious young Police Captain Kumjorn as arranged by her father, the governor of Suphanburi province.

Mahesuan is bitter about his status as second fiddle to Dum. Until Dum came along, Mahesuan was the top gunman in the outlaw gang headed by the ruthless Fai. Mahesuan goes looking for Dum and finds him playing a harmonica. Mahesuan mocks the Black Tiger's sentimentality and challenges him to a gunfight. The quick-drawing Dum fires first, yet Mahesuan is uninjured. A decapitated snake drops from an overhanging tree branch onto Mahesuan's cowboy hat. Dum targeted the venomous snake, saving Mahesuan's life.

Retrieving his harmonica, Dum thinks back to his childhood 10 years earlier during the Second World War, when Rumpoey and her father left the city to stay on Dum's father's farm in rural Thailand.

Rumpoey smashes a bamboo flute that Dum is playing and demands that he take her on a boat ride in the lotus swamp. The rich city girl says that she will take Dum to visit Bang Pu beach, if he will do all she commands. They visit the gazebo, or sala in Thai language, called "Sala Awaiting the Maiden." Dum tells her that a woodcutter built it to await a wealthy family's daughter with whom he had fallen in love. However, the maiden was prevented from meeting the woodcutter, so she hanged herself. Rumpoey weeps over this tragedy.

On the way home, they bump a boat carrying Koh and two other boys, who taunt Rumpoey. Dum defends Rumpoey, and Koh cuts Dum's forehead with a paddle, and his toadies overturn Dum's boat. Dum rescues Rumpoey but is late in bringing her home. So his father, commanding, "Never again!" severely beats the boy's back with a rattan cane. Rumpoey, feeling sorry for getting Dum into trouble, gives him a harmonica to replace the flute she smashed.

Closer to "present" time, Captain Kumjorn tells the governor of his plan to attack the bandit Fai and bring order to the lawless wild west of Suphanburi province. Taking leave of his rather cold fiancée, Captain Kumjorn takes a small, framed portrait of Rumpoey, warmly promising to guard her photo with his life.

At an ancient Buddhist temple, Mahesuan and Dum swear a blood oath in front of the Buddha statue. Mahesuan swears loyalty to Dum, "If I break this oath, may his gun take my life."

A betrayer guides Kumjorn's police forces to Fai's hideout, and the outlaws run out of ammunition. The police are charging in to mop up, when Dum and Mahesuan arrive on a cliff overlooking the battle. The pair break out rocket-propelled grenades and wipe out the police.

Fai imprisons Kumjorn in a cabin and orders Dum to execute him. Kumjorn pleads with Dum to tell his fiancée of his fate and hands Dum the framed photo of his beloved. Dum is stunned to see the portrait of Rumpoey. Mahesuan enters to find Kumjorn gone and Dum injured with a knife in his chest.

As Dum's wound is being treated, he thinks back to one year earlier, when he was a university student in Bangkok, where he became re-acquainted with Rumpoey. Dum pleads with her to leave him alone, reasoning that she is too beautiful and high born for a serious relationship with him. Later, Rumpoey is attacked by Koh and two toadies. Dum appears on the path and routs Rumpoey's attackers, for which he is expelled. Rumpoey finds Dum walking and insists on giving him a ride in her car. She orders her driver to take them to Bang Pu beach. Dum and Rumpoey confide their love for each other and are engaged, agreeing to meet a year later at Sala Awaiting the Maiden.

Arriving home in Suphanburi, however, Dum finds his family murdered. With his dying breath, Dum's father blames Kong, and Dum swears vengeance. Dum shoots Kong and several of his clan with his father's lever-action carbine, but is chased into the forest. With one cartridge left, Dum turns the gun on himself, but is stopped by Fai, who has ridden up with his horsemen. Fai recognizes the rifle, saying he had given it to Dum's father years before. Fai hands Dum a loaded revolver and tells him to execute the men who murdered his father. Dum is now an outlaw.

Shifting to the night before Rumpoey's wedding to Kumjorn, the frustrated woman tries to hang herself but is stopped by her nanny.

Fai, meanwhile, plans to attack the governor's mansion on the wedding night. Dum warns of the multitude of police who will be attending the Captain's nuptials, but Fai declares a love of danger.

On their way to attack the governor's mansion, Mahesuan tricks and disarms Dum, whom he accuses of intentionally freeing Kumjorn. A co-conspirator congratulates Mahesuan on robbing the Tiger of his teeth.

Dum, dressed in a white suit, appears at the wedding, wishes groom and bride a happy life, and warns Kumjorn of Fai's plan to attack. Kumjorn, however, tries to shoot the man he knows as the "Black Tiger", who is his rival for Rumpoey's affection.

Just ahead of the outlaw gang's assault, Mahesuan sneaks into the mansion, where he finds Rumpoey and knocks her unconscious.

Fai's attack kills many police officers. Fai enters the mansion, but the governor drives a bayonet through his chest and then shoots him dead.

Mahesuan is carrying Rumpoey across the lawn, when he meets Dum, who demands a rematch gunfight. The men fire simultaneously. Mahesuan's bullet is deflected harmlessly, but Dum's fated bullet rips through Mahesuan's teeth. Dum drops his weapon and tends to Rumpoey.

Kumjorn confronts Dum at gunpoint. Dum reaches into his breast pocket, and Kumjorn shoots Dum—right through the framed portrait of Rumpoey for which he had been reaching. As Dum lies dying in the rain with Rumpoey sobbing over him, some of Dum's words from earlier are narrated again – that life is suffering and a chasing after brief moments of hope.

== Cast ==
- Chartchai Ngamsan as Dum Dua, or Seua Dum (Black Tiger)
- Suwinit Panjamawat as Dum Dua (youth)
- Stella Malucchi as Rumpoey Prasit
- Supakorn Kitsuwon as Mahesuan
- Arawat Ruangvuth as Police Captain Kumjorn
- Sombat Metanee as Fai
- Pairoj Jaisingha as Phya Prasit (Rumpoey's father)
- Naiyana Sheewanun as Rumpoey's maid
- Kanchit Kwanpracha as Kamnan Dua (Dum's father)
- Chamloen Sridang as Sergeant Yam

== Production ==
=== Origins ===
While Tears of the Black Tiger has been compared to the Revisionist Westerns of Sam Peckinpah and Sergio Leone, director Wisit Sasanatieng drew on many Thai cultural influences in the creation of the film, including Thai films of the 1950s made by pioneering director Rattana Pestonji, whose films Wisit had viewed in screenings at the Thailand National Film Archive.

"Whenever the Film Archive screened an old film, I'd be there. Usually, I'd be the only one there", Wisit said in an interview at the Vancouver International Film Festival in 2000. "Most Thai audiences dislike Thai movies, especially the old ones, which they consider nam nao", he said, using the Thai language euphemism for the old films, which are viewed as stagnant and clichéd. Literally, nam nao means "stinky water."

"What I saw in them was a way to stay true to the spirit of those old styles of Thai filmmaking, as well as a way to make them new again. And none of the older generation of filmmakers impressed me more than Rattana Pestonji."

In addition to Rattana's 1950s and 1960s drama films, Tears of the Black Tiger draws on 1960s and 1970s Thai action cinema, derisively termed by critics as raboed phoo khao phao krathom ("bomb the mountain, burn the huts") films. Among the stars from this era were Mitr Chaibancha and Sombat Metanee, who co-stars as gang leader Fai. Wisit has acknowledged the influence of Leone's Spaghetti Westerns but has said, "mine is 'Tom Yum Goong cowboys' because at one time cowboys were very popular in Thai films as you can see in Mitr Chaibancha's films."

Still more influences include the novels of Thai humorist Por Intharapalit and an old Thai pop ballad, "Fon Sang Fah" ("When the Rain Bids the Sky Farewell"). "I do love those 'rain' songs. I kept picturing a beautiful frame of two guys shooting each other in the rain. And that sparked it all", Wisit said in an interview for the film's production notes. Initially Fon Sang Fah was to be the title of the film, but eventually Fah talai jone (literally "the heavens strike the thief") was chosen because the name has different meanings depending on the context. In addition to being the Thai name for an herb, Andrographis paniculata, Fah talai jone "can convey either a sense of obsoleteness or the feel of great chic", the director said. "In terms of the film it refers to predestination, in which most Thais believe. To put it frankly, the main reason is simply because I liked the name."

=== Production design, lighting, processing ===
Tears of the Black Tiger was the directorial debut for Wisit, who had previously penned the screenplays for the 1950s-set teenage gangster tale Dang Bireley's and Young Gangsters and the historical Thai ghost legend, Nang Nak, both directed by Nonzee Nimibutr, who produced Tears of the Black Tiger. Production design was by Ek Iemchuen, a classmate of Wisit's from Silpakorn University who also worked on Nang Nak and Dang Bireley's as well as the 2001 period drama, Jan Dara, also by Nonzee.

The production designs reflects traditional aspects of Thai culture. For example, the first gun battle between Mahesuan and Dum is set on what is obviously a sound stage with a painted backdrop, a setting that is similar to likay, a Thai form of folk opera.

"I wanted the audience to feel like they're reading a novel with moving illustrations", Wisit said. "It's pure imagination and completely unrealistic. I wanted to try and go back to our roots. I wanted to make a link between the traditional and the contemporary in our own style."

Over-saturated colors were used to reflect scenes of rural Thailand, which the director saw as bright and colorful. Walls on the sets and locations were painted pink or green, and lighting was used to achieve the saturation. The film was treated in the color grading process by transferring it to digital Betacam tape and then back to 35 mm film. Oxide Pang, working as a telecine colorist, won a special effects award in Thailand for his work.

Wisit was able to experiment with the set design and lighting effects in a commercial he directed for Wrangler Jeans, which featured the film's leading man, Chartchai Ngamsan, as a boxer.

=== Casting and promotion ===
Most of the cast were relative newcomers, whom the director said he chose because he felt established stars would not be able to handle the old-style dialog. Chartchai Ngamsan and Supakorn Kitsuwon had previously had supporting roles in Dang Bireley's and Young Gangsters. Italian-born, Thailand-raised model and actress Stella Malucchi was acting in a music video in Bangkok, which was noticed on television by Wisit. He then sought out Malucchi, saying he thought she had the right look for the part of Rumpoey. He told her later she reminded him of Elizabeth Taylor. Through costuming and makeup, Malucchi, a "plain farang", in the words of Wisit, was transformed into the daughter of a Thai noble family. There are experienced actors in the cast as well, including Sombat Metanee and Naiyana Sheewanun, who worked in the era of Thai filmmaking that Wisit was trying to recreate.

Old-style ways of promoting the film were used. In the 1950s, films in Thailand were promoted with serial novels and radio dramas. Wisit and his wife Siripan Techajindawong, writing under the pen name Koynuch, wrote some chapters that were published for a Fah talai jone book after the film was released. A radio version of Fah talai jone was performed while the film was in cinemas in Thailand. Wisit designed movie posters and print ads that emulated the style of Thai film posters from the 1950s and 1960s.

== Reception ==
=== Festivals and awards ===
Tears of the Black Tiger opened on September 28, 2000, in a wide release for Thai cinemas. The film was a flop at the domestic box office, but it received several awards. At the Thailand National Film Association Awards, the film won best costume design for Chaiwichit Somboon. The Bangkok Critics Assembly awarded Ek Iamchuen for best artistic design, Sombat Metanee for best supporting actor and Amornbhong Methakunavudh for best film score. The Entertainment News Reporters Association of Thailand gave Phra Suraswadee, or "Golden Doll", prizes to lyricist Siriphan Techajindawong and arranger Sunthorn Yodseethong for the song "Kamsuanjan" ("The Moon Lament"), Ek Iemchuen for best art direction and telecine colorist Oxide Pang for best special effects. Tears of the Black Tiger was referenced in another Thai film, Monrak Transistor, in 2001. The comedy by director Pen-ek Ratanaruang starred Supakorn Kitsuwon, who co-starred in Tears as Mahesuan. At the 2006 Bangkok International Film Festival, Tears of the Black Tiger was screened as part of a tribute to Sombat Metanee, who portrays the outlaw leader, Fai.

The film's North American premiere was on October 5, 2000, at the Vancouver International Film Festival, where it won the Dragons and Tigers Award for best new director. It was the first Thai film to be screened at the Cannes Film Festival, where it was in the Un Certain Regard competition in May 2001. At the Gijón International Film Festival in 2001, it won the best art direction award, and at the fifth Bucheon International Fantastic Film Festival it won a jury prize. Other festival appearances included the Seattle International Film Festival and Edinburgh International Film Festival in 2001 and the Sundance Film Festival, International Film Festival Rotterdam, Deauville Asian Film Festival and Moscow International Film Festival in 2002.

=== Critical reception ===
On Rotten Tomatoes, the film has a 76% fresh rating, based on 58 reviews. On Metacritic, it has a score of 69/100, based on 19 reviews, for a "generally favorable" rating. Critics were "wowed" by the film at the 2001 Cannes Film Festival, according to Peter Bradshaw of The Guardian, who termed the film a "stir-fry horse opera [and an] uproarious high-camp cowboy drama."

Philip French of The Observer found parallels to Once Upon a Time in the West, particularly between the anti-hero Dum and Charles Bronson's harmonica-playing character. He also saw similarities to the deliberately artificial action of Sam Raimi's The Quick and the Dead. He said the "outlandishly painted backdrops and garish acid colors" reminded him of old Asian movie posters. "The overall effect is hallucinatory, as if we're experiencing someone else's druggy dream."

Chuck Stephens, writing for Film Comment, said the blend of 1970s Thai action cinema and the Spaghetti Westerns of Sergio Leone results in a "hybrid of hybrids ... a Pad Thai Western where cowboys covet machine guns and swear blood oath to one another under the shadow of an impassive Buddha."

The BBC's Jason Korsner criticized the film for its "deliberately laboured plot", which he said was "offset by some fascinating action sequences, including gunfights which would make Tarantino jealous."

However, Sight & Sound magazine's Edward Buscombe called the action "tame by contemporary Hollywood standards" but said it was "curiously seductive" because of its colorful imagery. Buscombe, as well as Philip French, remarked how Tears of the Black Tiger contrasted with another Asian cinema export to the West that year: the balletic martial arts film, Crouching Tiger, Hidden Dragon.

David Edelstein of New York Magazine compared the film to 1940s low-budget Westerns of Lash LaRue, Douglas Sirk melodramas, the heroic bloodshed films of John Woo and George A. Romero's gore-filled horror films. "It's no buried postmodern masterpiece, but it certainly is a jaw-dropper: a delirium-inducing crash course in international trash", Edelstein wrote.

A. O. Scott of The New York Times commented on the stoic, macho posturing of Chartchai Ngamsan's Dum, and the underlying homoeroticism of the character's relationship with Mahesuan, portrayed by Supakorn Kitsuwon. "[Rumpoey] may be the love of Dum's life, but there is far more heat and intimacy in his relationship with Mahesuan."

Elizabeth Weitzman of the New York Daily News noted the film's appeal as a camp film and as a cult film, saying "the best B-movies are both."

== Purchase by Miramax, alternate versions ==
International sales rights to Tears of the Black Tiger were purchased by Fortissimo Films, which marketed a 101-minute "international cut", edited by director Wisit Sasanatieng from the original 110-minute length. The shorter version omits some transitional scenes in order to streamline the pacing of the film. This version was released theatrically in several countries, including France, the Netherlands and the United Kingdom.

Among the deleted scenes are those involving the comic relief character, Sergeant Yam, Rumpoey's engagement to Captain Kumjorn and other transitional scenes.

Fortissimo sold distribution rights for North and Latin America, Scandinavia and South Africa to Miramax Films during the 2001 Cannes Film Festival. Miramax then sent word that it wanted to alter the film. Wisit offered the company an even shorter version than the international cut, but the company refused. "They didn't allow me to re-cut it at all", Wisit said in an interview with the Los Angeles Times. "They did it by themselves and then sent me the tape. And they changed the ending from tragic to happy. They said that in the time after 9/11, nobody would like to see something sad."

Altering films was routine for Miramax, at the time headed by Harvey and Bob Weinstein, who defended their actions by saying the films needed editing to make them marketable to American audiences. Other examples were the Miramax releases of Shaolin Soccer and Hero. "I'm not cutting for fun", Harvey Weinstein said in an interview. "I'm cutting for the shit to work. All my life I served one master: the film. I love movies."

The Miramax version was screened at the Sundance Film Festival in 2002. The company then shelved the film, fearing it would not do well in a wider release.

This was another routine by the Weinsteins, who delayed releases so they could shift potential money-losing films to future fiscal years and ensure they would receive annual bonuses from Miramax's then-corporate parent, The Walt Disney Company.

As Tears of the Black Tiger languished in the Miramax vaults, its cult film status was heightened and it became a "Holy Grail" for film fans. For viewers in the US, the only way to watch it was to purchase the DVD from overseas importers, however some of those versions of the film had also been heavily edited.

In late 2006, Magnolia Pictures acquired the film's US distribution rights from Miramax. Magnolia screened the original version of the film in a limited release from January to April 2007 in several US cities.

== DVD releases ==
The original version of the film, with English subtitles, was released on DVD in Thailand by Digital Right, and it is out of print. A Singaporean Region 3 release, also with English subtitles, had scenes involving graphic violence cut. The Region 2 release, marketed in Europe by Pathé and in Region 4 by Madman Entertainment is the 101-minute "international cut".

The first DVD release for Region 1 was on April 24, 2007, by Magnolia Pictures, which acquired the original, uncut version of the film.

== Soundtrack ==
Tears of the Black Tiger

Soundtrack album by various artists
- Released: 2000
- Genres: Big band jazz, easy listening pop
- Length: 38:20
- Label: BEC-TERO Entertainment

Soundtrack
Review scores
| Source | Rating |
|---|---|
| Music from the Movies | 3/5 stars |

Just as Tears of the Black Tiger has been compared to the Spaghetti Westerns of director Sergio Leone, the music in the film has been likened to the scores Ennio Morricone composed for Leone's films.

However, the score is sourced from the types of big band jazz and pop music sounds that were heard in Thailand in the 1940s and 1950s. Among the songs is the 1940s Thai pop ballad, "Fon Sang Fah" ("When the Rain Bids the Sky Farewell"). There is also "Mercy", composed by 1940s Thai bandleader and jazz violinist Eua Sunthornsanan, which features whimsical fiddle playing and whistling. However, the lyrics to the song, written by Leud Prasomsap, offer a contrast to the mood evoked by the jaunty tune:

What a miserable life, so alone
No one cares for me
I'm so alone, so lonesome I could die.

A traditional song, "Kamsuanjan" ("The Moon Lament"), was arranged with new lyrics by Wisit's wife, Siripan Techajindawong. She and arranger Sunthorn Yodseethong won the Phra Suraswadee ("Golden Doll") prize for best song from the Entertainment News Reporters Association of Thailand. The song's tune was taken from Thomas Moore's The Last Rose of Summer. Its lyrics was partly inspired by the Moore's as well.

=== Track listing ===
A soundtrack CD was issued around the time the film was released. The first half of the CD is songs with vocals. The songs are then repeated as instrumentals.

1. "Mercy" – composed by Leud Prasomsap and Eua Sunthornsanan; performed by Veera Bamrungsri (3:01)
2. "Kamsuanjan" ("The Moon Lament") – traditional, lyrics by Wisit Sasanatieng and Siripan Techajindawong; performed by Yaowaret Methakhunnawut (3:23)
3. "Fon Sang Fah" ("When the Rain Bid the Sky Farewell") – composed by Salai Krailoed and Suthin Thesarak; performed by Kamonwan Thasanon (2:49)
4. "Prom Likit" ("Pre-Destiny")– composed by Kaew Achariyakun and Wet Sunthonjamon; performed by Niwat Charoenmit (2:55)
5. "Beautiful Beach" – composed by Sakon Mitranon and Sanae Komarachun; performed by Kamonwan Thasanon (3:10)
6. "Splendid Night Sky" – composed by Kaew Achariyakun and Eua Sunthornsanan; performed by Yaowaret Mathakhunnawut (3:04)
7. "Mercy" – composed by Eua Sunthornsanan (3:01)
8. "Kamsuanjan" ("The Moon Lament") – traditional (3:24)
9. "Fon Sang Fah" ("When the Rain Bid the Sky Farewell") – composed by Suthin Thesarak (2:51)
10. "Destiny" – composed by Wet Sunthonjamon (2:55)
11. "Beautiful Beach" – composed by Sanae Komarachun (3:11)
12. "Splendid Night Sky" – composed by Eua Sunthornsanan (3:04)
13. "Horse Riding" (1:04)
