= Citizen Dog (film) =

- DVD cover
- Directed by: Wisit Sasanatieng
- Written by: Siriphan Techajindawong (novel); Wisit Sasanatieng (screenplay)
- Produced by: Charoen Iamphungporn (exec); Aphiradee Iamphungporn; Kiatkamon Iamphungporn; Rewat Vorarat
- Starring: Mahasamut Boonyaruk; Saengthong Gate-Uthong
- Narrated by: Pen-Ek Ratanaruang
- Cinematography: Rewat Prelert
- Edited by: Polarat Kitikunpairoj; Dusanee Puinongpho
- Music by: Mahasamut Boonyaruk; Wisit Sasanatieng; Modern Dog
- Distributed by: Five Star Production
- Release date: 12 December 2004
- Running time: 100 minutes
- Country: Thailand
- Language: Thai
- Budget: 60 million baht

Citizen Dog (Thai: หมานคร; RTGS: Ma Nakhon; IPA: [mǎːnákʰɔːn]) is a 2004 Thai romance film, directed by Wisit Sasanatieng and based on a novel by Wisit's wife, Koynuch (Siriphan Techajindawong), which was illustrated by him. The second film by the director of Tears of the Black Tiger, it is a colorful story set in contemporary Bangkok, where a boy (Pod) without a goal in life falls in love with a girl (Jin) who lives for her dreams. The film is frequently compared with the French movie Amélie. One of the main themes of the movie is that people will only find something from the moment when they stopped looking for it.

The movie has been distributed outside Asia by Luc Besson's EuropaCorp.

== Plot ==
Pod is a country boy who moves to Bangkok, despite his grandmother's warning that he'll grow a tail. He finds a small house to live in and takes a job in a sardine cannery, getting rides to work on the back of a motorcycle taxi, the rider of which has been made a zombie after one day it rained motorcycle helmets and he wasn't wearing one.

One hot day the assembly line at the cannery malfunctions. In the confusion, Pod chops his index finger off and it ends up in a can that is trucked away to a local grocery store. He searches everyday, buying can after can of sardines. Eventually he sees a can jumping around and opens it to find a finger. He attaches it simply by pressing it into place.

But something does not feel right. He must have someone else's finger. During a lunch break, he recognises his own finger on a co-worker who is getting ready to pick his nose. He wrests the finger away and gives the man the other finger in return. The nose-picker is named Yod, and the two become friends.

Not wishing to lose any more fingers, Pod quits the factory and becomes a security guard. On the job in an office, he meets Jin, a maid who has her nose perpetually buried in a mysterious white book written in a foreign language that she dreams of someday understanding. The book literally landed at her feet one day while she was still living in the countryside, and since then she has been trying to decipher its meaning. She has obsessive-compulsive disorder, which makes her want to constantly clean and set things in order.

Pod is smitten and wishes to be closer to Jin. Inspired by Yod and his Chinese empress girlfriend, who consummated their relationship on a crowded bus, Pod asks Jin if she would like to ride the bus. But Jin refuses, saying she breaks out in a rash whenever she takes crowded public transport. Pod quits his job as a guard and becomes a taxicab driver so he can drive her to work.

Eventually, he expresses his true feelings for Jin, but she's become obsessed with a hippie farang, whom she's seen reading the same white book she has. She imagines the man is named Peter and believes he is an environmental activist who was killed in a protest in Washington, D.C. Inspired, she starts collecting plastic bottles, gathering enough to create a mountain that towers over the city, and joins an environmental protest movement calling for a ban on plastic.

Meanwhile, Pod has adventures in his taxicab, giving rides to a little girl with a foul mouth who smokes cigarettes and plays videogames. She has a teddy bear who also swears, smokes and drinks whiskey, and she eventually throws the teddy bear away. Another passenger is a man who incessantly licks things, and Pod must find a solution to make him stop. He also meets his grandmother, reincarnated as a gecko, who repeats her premonition that he'll grow a tail if he stays in the city.

Jin discovers Peter at a rally, who reveals his name is actually Andre and that the white book is an Italian gay romance novel. Crestfallen, Jin throws away the book and her activist lifestyle and leaves Bangkok, telling Pod she needs to be away from him. Pod quits as a taxi driver and returns to the country, only to grow bored as country life has literally slowed down compared to his life in Bangkok. He returns to the city to find that everyone now can and has grown a tail, except for him. He becomes a celebrity, but continues to search for Jin in vain. Pod climbs the plastic mountain and finds her there, confesses his love again and kisses her, overwhelming her doubts about their future.

Six months later, the mountain is a picnic for lovebirds, the girl and her teddy bear marry, and Jin, now running a plastic company into the ground as a successful business woman, is married to Pod and expecting a child. Through a long list of reincarnated animals, Pod believes that his child will actually be his grandmother.

== Cast ==
- Mahasamut Boonyaruk as Pod
- Saengthong Gate-Uthong as Jin
- Sawatwong Palakawong Na Autthaya as Yod
- Chuck Stephens as Peter/Andre
- Raenkum Saninn as Grandmother of Pod
- Pen-Ek Ratanaruang as Narrator

== Festivals and awards ==
- Best visual effects, 2004 Thailand National Film Association Awards.
- Silver Prize for Most Groundbreaking Film and Bronze Prize for Best Asian Film at the 2006 Fantasia Festival.
- shown in 2005 at the "58. International Filmfestival Locarno" (Switzerland) open air on the "Piazza Grande"
- Critics prize, 2005 Deauville Asian Film Festival
- Also screened at the 2005 Toronto International Film Festival, Vancouver International Film Festival, Pusan International Film Festival, Munich Asia Filmfest, Vienna International Film Festival, Tokyo International Film Festival, Frankfurt Asia Filmfest, London Film Festival, Thessaloniki International Film Festival, International Film Festival Rotterdam and the Taipei Film Festival.
- Sixth on the Top 10 Best Films of 2005 by Time magazine film critic Richard Corliss.

== Soundtrack ==
No soundtrack album has been issued. The opening and closing theme is a cover of "...Before", originally performed by Thailand indie rockers Modern Dog. The song is used as a recurring motif. The soundtrack also features songs by Mahasamut Boonyaruk, who starred as Pod and is a musician in the Bangkok underground band Saliva Bastards. Director Wisit Sasanatieng also composed songs for the score.

== DVD ==
The DVD was released in Thailand in 2005 (Region 3) and contained no English subtitles. The film was licensed for release in Hong Kong with English subtitles in 2006, and was released in early 2007 by Asia Video Publishing on an all-region disc.
