= Tero Entertainment =

Thai media company

Tero Entertainment Public Co. Ltd.
- Formerly: World Media Supply (12 May 1994 - 26 March 1998); BEC-Tero Entertainment (27 March 1998 - 7 December 2020)
- Company type: Public limited company
- Industry: Mass media
- Headquarters: Bangkok, Thailand
- Key people: Brian L. Marcar, director
- Products: Music, concerts, films, television shows
- Website: www.teroasia.com

Tero Entertainment Public Co. Ltd., formerly known as BEC-Tero Entertainment and World Media Supply is a mass media and entertainment company in Thailand. It organizes and promotes concerts, owns record labels and produces films and television shows. World Media Supply was formed on 12 May 1994 and BEC-Tero Entertainment was formed on March 27, 1998 as a majority-owned subsidiary of BEC World Public Co. Ltd. (the operator of Thai Channel 3), in a joint venture with Brian L. Marcar,

In December 2020 BEC World announced the sale of its shares in BEC-Tero to Marcar, totaling 15 million baht, and the company name was changed to Tero Entertainment.

In March 2021, Tero withdrew all programs produced on Channel 3 HD from their programming in order to produce new programs on Channel 7 HD, except for the morning news programs that have been changed to the channel's news department.

== Sony Music Entertainment (Thailand) ==
In 2001, BEC-TERO entered into a partnership with Sony Music Entertainment to create a Thai division of the record label. The partnership was terminated in mid 2007, however, the partnership was revived in 2012. Among the artists on Sony Music's roster were Tata Young, one of Thailand's most popular female artists, and Same Same consisting of Clint Moffatt and Bob Moffatt formerly of The Moffatts. The company also had the Bakery Music and Black Sheep record labels, which are focused on the indie music scene. In addition, the company also distribute the LOVEis record label.

== THAITICKETMAJOR ==
BEC-TERO has its own THAITICKETMASTER brand in Thailand since 1999 to support its concert business, and is the primary retailer of tickets to concerts and other events in Thailand. It has several outlets in Thailand's Central Department Store chain, as well as sales through its website. In 2007, THAITICKETMASTER merged with Major Ticketing, owned by Major Cineplex Group, forming THAITICKETMAJOR. Tickets outlets now include all Major and EGV Cinema ticket outlets, and about 50 branches of post office. In February 2007, THAITICKETMAJOR adds intercity bus ticketing to their line of services.

== Concert promotion ==
BEC-TERO is the primary promoter and organizer of pop music concerts by foreign artists in Thailand. Artists brought to Thailand by BEC-TERO include Elton John and 50 Cent. Most of the bigger shows are held at Impact Arena in Mueang Thong Thani, Amphoe Pak Kret.

For a few years, the company hosted smaller events in what was known as BEC-TERO Hall in Suan Lum Night Bazaar in Lumphini, Bangkok. It is used for concerts and other events. Artists who have performed there include Bryan Ferry, The Pretenders and The Black Eyed Peas. The company's lease on the Suan Lum location expired in March 2007, and the hall was renamed Bangkok Hall. The company is looking for another location for its own event hall.

== Film Bangkok ==
Film Bangkok and Chalermthai Studio are the film-production arms of BEC-TERO. Until 2005, Film Bangkok was run by Adirek Wattaleela, a producer and director who is often enigmatically credited as simply "Uncle". The last film to be produced by the now-shuttered Film Bangkok was SARS Wars.

=== List of films produced by Film Bangkok ===
Films produced by Film Bangkok include:

- Angulimala
- Bangkok Dangerous
- Bangrajan
- Goal Club
- SARS Wars
- Saving Private Tootsie
- Som and Bank: Bangkok for Sale (One Take Only)
- Tears of the Black Tiger
- The Remaker
- The Siam Renaissance

== Tero Radio ==
Tero Radio Company Limited operated several stations, as listed below. In 2025, the company announced that they would be shutting down at the end of the year, citing shifting trends in media consumption.

Name	Frequency	Type/Status
HITZ Thailand	FM: 95.5 Bangkok; Online	Top 40 music, both domestic and international; defunct as of 2025.
Eazy FM	FM: 102.5 Bangkok; Online	English pop music; defunct as of 2025.
Goodtime Radio	FM: 88.5 Bangkok; 88.0 Chiang Mai; 94.5 Songkhla; 104.0 Ubon Ratchathani; Online	Domestic adult contemporary music; defunct as of 2025.
Tofu Pop Radio	Online	Asian Pop music; defunct as of 2025.
Star FM	Online	Domestic hit artists music; defunct as of 2024.
Rock ON Radio	Online	Rock music, both domestic and international; defunct as of 2024.
RAD Radio	Online	EDM music; defunct as of 2024.

== See also ==
- Media of Thailand
