= The King of the White Elephant =

1940 film

- The 50th anniversary poster.
- Directed by: Sunh Vasudhara
- Written by: Pridi Banomyong
- Produced by: Pridi Banomyong
- Starring: Renu Kritayakon; Suvat Nilsen
- Cinematography: Prasart Sukhum
- Music by: Phra Jenduriyang
- Distributed by: Pridi Films; Thai Film Foundation
- Release date: 1940
- Running time: 100 minutes
- Country: Thailand
- Language: English

The King of the White Elephant (Thai: พระเจ้าช้างเผือก, RTGS: Phra Chao Chang Phueak) is a 1940 Thai historical drama film.

Based on a novel by Pridi Banomyong, who was also the producer, and released before Thailand's involvement in World War II, the English-language film carried a propaganda message from anti-war interests in Thailand, that Thailand should remain neutral, and only go to war to defend its sovereignty against foreign invaders. However, on December 8, 1941, Thailand was occupied by the Japanese and officially sided with the Axis powers during the war.

== Plot ==
Set in the Ayutthaya Kingdom of the 16th century, King Chakra is going about his usual palace duties, granting audiences to his advisers, including his Lord Chamberlain, who is keen to see the king fulfill his royal duty of taking 366 wives, including, hopefully among them, the chamberlain's own daughter.

However, the threat of invasion by the King of Honsa (Thai: หงสาวดี Hongsawadi, Burmese: Hanthawaddy kingdom of Burma) has King Chakra pre-occupied. The peace-loving King Chakra at first wants to negotiate for peace, but is unsuccessful, and finds himself forced to go to war to stop the Honsa (Hanthawaddy) invasion.

== Cast ==
- Renu Kritayakon as King Chakra
- Nit Mahakanok as Governor of Kanburi
- Pairin Nilsen as Renoo
- Suvat Nilsen as Lord Chamberlain
- Pradab Rabilvongse as King of Honsa
- Luang Srisurang as Minister of War

== Production ==
Pridi Banomyong, at the time Minister of Finance in the government of Prime Minister Plaek Pibulsonggram, produced the film, which was based on an English-language novel he had written. The cast of the movie were lecturers and students from Thammasat University, which Pridi had founded.

The film was made with the intent of conveying Pridi's conception of peace to international audiences, and was filmed in English, the first Thai film to do so. The film also took its themes from Buddhist philosophy, that there is no happiness that is greater than peace, but also carried the message that Pridi thought Thailand was ready to fight a war of aggression by any foreign invaders.

The movie was screened in New York City and Singapore.

After Japan invaded Thailand on December 8, 1941, Pridi became a leader of the Free Thai Movement resistance movement, while the Thai military dictators sided with Japan in the Axis Powers and declared war on Great Britain and the United States.

== Restoration ==
The King of the White Elephant was among two films chosen for a restoration project launched by the Thailand Ministry of Culture, with cooperation from Technicolor and the Thai Film Foundation. The film is the oldest surviving Thai film in its complete form.

The 35-mm negative of the film had actually been lost during World War II, but a 16-mm print that had been archived in the Library of Congress survived, and a new 35-mm copy was made from that print. Also, two versions of the film survive, the full 100-minute version and a 50-minute version. Both versions of the unrestored film were released on DVD in 2005 by the Thai Film Foundation.

The restored print was presented at the inaugural Phuket Film Festival in October 2007.

The other film selected for the 2005 restoration effort was The Boat House (Ruen Pae), a 1962 musical romance.

== Legacy ==
The King of the White Elephant is widely regarded as the only surviving complete Thai feature film made before World War II, and has been noted for its 35 mm black-and-white production and English-language dialogue intended for international audiences, as well as its explicit message advocating peace and diplomacy.

In April 2025, UNESCO added The King of the White Elephant and the archival documents to the Memory of the World International Register, describing the film as a unique record of Thai entertainment and filmmaking of its era that combines traditional Thai performances with Western cinematic language.

The film is also used in contemporary commemorations and discussions of peace: the Thai Film Archive has screened it for the International Day of Peace, noting that modern audiences—particularly younger viewers—often interpret it not only as an anti-war statement but also as a window into Thai social attitudes and cultural imagination of the late 1930s–1940s, including its opening images of Bangkok in the late 1930s.

UNESCO has additionally highlighted the Thai Film Archive's role in safeguarding the film as part of broader audiovisual heritage preservation efforts; the Archive received UNESCO's Fellini Silver Medal Award in 2007 for work within the Memory of the World Programme, including preservation work related to the film.

== See also ==
- White elephant
- White elephant (pachyderm)
