= Pen-ek Ratanaruang =

Thai film director and screenwriter

- เป็นเอก รัตนเรือง
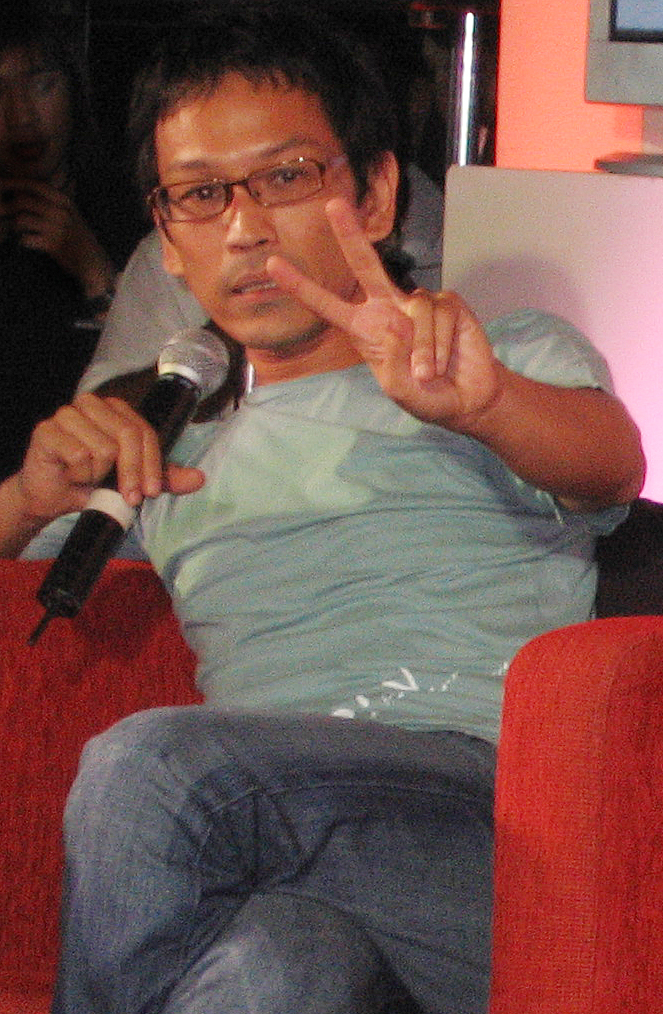
- Pen-ek at press preview for Ploy in 2007
- Born: 8 March 1962 (age 64); Bangkok, Thailand
- Education: Pratt Institute
- Occupations: Film director; screenwriter
- Notable work: Monrak Transistor; Last Life in the Universe; Invisible Waves

Pen-ek Ratanaruang (Thai: เป็นเอก รัตนเรือง; RTGS: Pen-ek Rattanarueang; born 8 March 1962, Bangkok, Thailand) is a Thai film director and screenwriter. He is best known for his arthouse work, Last Life in the Universe, and is considered to be one of Thai cinema's leading "new wave" auteurs, alongside Wisit Sasanatieng and Apichatpong Weerasethakul. He goes by the nickname Tom and is sometimes credited as Tom Pannet.

== Biography ==
=== Education and early career ===
Pen-ek studied from 1977-85 at the Pratt Institute in New York and worked as freelance illustrator and designer with Designframe. In 1993, he started work at the Film Factory in Bangkok, where he worked with Wisit Sasanatieng. At Film Factory, Pen-ek made several television commercials, winning a bronze medal at the 1997 Cannes Lion Awards for a Clairol anti-dandruff shampoo spot entitled "Dance".

=== Debut film, international recognition ===
He made his debut feature film, Fun Bar Karaoke in 1997. It's the story of a young woman named Pu whose father falls in love with a hostess girl who's the girlfriend of a mobster. A hitman named Noi (Ray McDonald) is dispatched to kill the father, and Pu ends up falling in love with Noi. Far Bar Karaoke was screened at many film festivals after its world premiere at the Berlin Film Festival.

Pen-ek's second film, Ruang Talok 69 (6ixtynin9), is another crime comedy. In it, a young woman (Lalita Panyopas) finds an instant noodle box filled with money that has been mistakenly placed at her doorstep and she runs afoul of some mobsters. The film was Thailand's submission to the 73rd Academy Awards for Best Foreign Language Film in 1999. It was also screened at the Rotterdam Film Festival and other festivals.

His third film, Monrak Transistor (Transistor Love Story), is a bittersweet Thai country music love story involving a young man named Pan (Supakorn Kitsuwon) who marries his sweetheart (Siriyakorn Pukkavesh), is drafted into the military and then goes absent without leave to pursue his dreams of being a singer. The film premiered at the Director's Fortnight event at the 2002 Cannes Film Festival. It was also submitted by Thailand to the 75th Academy Awards.

Pen-ek served as editor for director Nonzee Nimibutr's 2003 film, OK Baytong, and was the narrator on Wisit Sasanatiang's 2004 film, Citizen Dog. In 2004, Pen-ek was among the artists receiving the inaugural Silpathorn Award by the Office of Contemporary Art and Culture, Ministry of Culture of Thailand. The award is given annually to contemporary artists.

=== Pan-Asian concepts ===
For his fourth film, Last Life in the Universe, he teamed up with writer Prabda Yoon, cinematographer Christopher Doyle and Japanese actor Tadanobu Asano. Asano portrays a Japanese man on the run from the yakuza in Thailand. It also features Japanese director Takashi Miike in a small role as a yakuza. It was selected for competition at the Rotterdam festival, won the best actor award for Asano at the Venice International Film Festival and was Thailand's submission to the 2003 Academy Awards.

Pen-ek worked again with Prabda, Doyle and Asano on Invisible Waves, about a Japanese chef who commits a murder in Macau and flees to Thailand. The film also stars Hong Kong actor Eric Tsang and Korean actress Kang Hye-jung. It was selected for competition at the 2006 Berlin Film Festival, where it had its world premiere. Invisible Waves was also the opening film for the 2006 Bangkok International Film Festival, where it also was in competition.

Pen-ek was selected to take part in the Digital Short Films by Three Directors project at the 2006 Jeonju International Film Festival. He directed a short called Twelve Twenty, about a young man (Ananda Everingham) who falls in love with a woman he sees on the other side of an airport terminal, and then fantasizes about her throughout a 12-hour, 20-minute airline flight. Christopher Doyle provided cinematography and was also featured in the film as the pilot. The other filmmakers taking part in the project were Singapore's Eric Khoo and Darezhan Omirbayev from Kazakhstan.

=== Recent works ===
Also in 2006, Pen-ek directed a short documentary, Total Bangkok, about an amateur football league that plays matches on a concrete pitch underneath an elevated expressway in Bangkok. The 21-minute film was sponsored by Nike. Pen-ek is a lifelong football fan.

Pen-ek then returned to screenwriting with Ploy, which he submitted to the 2006 Pusan International Film Festival's Pusan Promotion Project in an effort to secure funding. The film was screened at the Director's Fortnight at the 2007 Cannes Film Festival. Lalita Panyopas, who starred in Ruang Talok 69, returned to lead the cast, portraying a wife who grows jealous and angry after her husband befriends a teen-age girl.

The film, which also stars Ananda Everingham and Porntip Papanai, was censored in Thailand due to sex scenes. Pen-ek created a special Thai print of the film for its theatrical run there. Ploy was screened at several other film festivals, including the 2007 Bangkok International Film Festival, the Osian's Cinefan Festival of Asian and Arab Cinema (where it won the FIPRESCI award), the 2007 Toronto International Film Festival and the San Sebastián International Film Festival.

In 2007, Pen-ek directed a segment for Short Films Project in Commemoration of the Celebration on the Auspicious Occasion of His Majesty the King's 80th Birthday Anniversary, created in honor of King Bhumibol Adulyadej by the Ministry of Culture's Office of Contemporary Arts and Culture. The project featured nine films by 10 directors, including fellow Silpathorn Award winners Wisit Sasanatieng and Apichatpong Weerasethakul and veteran filmmaker Bhandit Rittakol.

For his segment, Siang Sawan (Luminous Sound), Pen-ek chose to interview blind pianist Sila Namthao, letting the musician perform some of the songs composed by the king, and talk about his inspirations and life. "We don't know the King well enough to make a film about him, so this is more like a present that someone would give him on a royal visit," Pen-ek explained in an interview. "If everyone were blind, perhaps our desires would be fewer and more simple. This has echoes of the king's sufficiency theory, and I hope the film will bring it home to the audience," Pen-ek said.

Also in 2007, Pen-ek was invited by the Toronto Reel Asian International Film Festival to present two of his short films, Total Bangkok and Twelve Twenty, as well as a collection of his commercials, in a program called Total Pen-Ek.

His 2011 film Headshot was selected as the Thai entry for the Best Foreign Language Oscar at the 85th Academy Awards, but it did not make the final shortlist.

== Filmography ==
=== Film ===
- Fun Bar Karaoke (1997)
- Ruang Talok 69 (6ixtynin9) (1999)
- Monrak Transistor (Transistor Love Story) (2001)
- Last Life in the Universe (Ruang Rak Noi Nid Mahasan) (2003)
- Invisible Waves (2006)
- Twelve Twenty (For Jeonju International Film Festival's Digital Short Films by Three Directors project, 2006)
- Total Bangkok (short film, 2006)
- Ploy (2007)
- Luminous Sound (Short Films Project in Commemoration of the Celebration on the Auspicious Occasion of His Majesty the King's 80th Birthday Anniversary, 2007)
- Nymph (2009)
- Headshot (2011)
- 60 Seconds of Solitude in Year Zero (2011)
- Paradoxocracy (2013)
- The Life of Gravity (2014)
- Samui Song (2017)
- Gatlang: Happiness, hardship and other stories (2018) dir. Pen - Ek Ratanaruang/ Passakorn Pramunwong
- Morte Cucina (2025)

=== Television series ===
- 6ixtynin9: The Series (2023)

== Honours ==
In February 2013, Pen-ek received an Ordre des Arts et des Lettres (Order of Arts and Letters) by the Ministry of Culture in France.

- Chevalier (Knight) of the Order of Arts and Letters (2013)
