= Five Star Production =

Thai film production company

Five Star Production Co. Ltd.
- Company type: Private
- Industry: Motion pictures
- Founded: 1973; 53 years ago
- Founder: Kiat Iamphungphorn
- Headquarters: Bangkok, Thailand
- Area served: Worldwide
- Key people: Charoen Iamphungphorn, president (deceased); Aphiradee Iamphungphorn; Kiatkamon Iamphungphorn; Kiattikul Iamphungphorn
- Website: www.fivestarproduction.co.th

Five Star Production Co. Ltd. (Thai: ไฟว์สตาร์ โปรดักชั่น) is a Thai film production company. It was founded in 1973 by Kiat Iamphungphorn and is today headed by his children, Aphiradee and her younger brothers Kiatkamon and Kiattikul. The company's films include the works of Wisit Sasanatieng (Tears of the Black Tiger, Citizen Dog) and Pen-Ek Ratanaruang (Ruang Talok 69, Monrak Transistor, Last Life in the Universe, Invisible Waves). Other directors associated with Five Star include Thanit Jitnukul, Bhandit Rittakol, and Poj Arnon.

== History ==
=== Introduction ===
Five Star Production was presented in international festivals. Tears of the Black Tiger, by Wisit Sasanatieng, was the first Thai film to compete in Un Certain Regard at the Cannes Film Festival in 2001, followed by Monrak Transistor by Pen-ek Ratanaruang, which was selected at Director's Fortnight of the Cannes Film Festival in 2002.

=== Production House ===
An example of collaboration with other international artists is the 2006 production Black Night, an omnibus film of stories from Hong Kong (Patrick Leung's Next Door), Japan (Takahiko Akiyama's Dark Hole) and Thailand (Thanit Jitnukul's The Lost Memory).

Five Star Production was represented at Cannes in 2007 for Quinzaine des Realisateurs (Directors’ Fortnight) with the film Ploy, directed by Pen-Ek Ratanaruang in a co-production with Fortissimo Films. It was the director's second time chosen for the category at Cannes. The film was also represented in India for the Fipresci 9th Asian's Cinefan Fest of Asian and Arab Cinema 2007.

Muay Thai Chaiya was released after Ploy and was a film honoring the roots of Thai martial arts.

=== Company Info ===
Five Star Production Established in 1973, Five Star Production Company Limited is one of Thailand's production and distribution houses. Through the years, Five Star Production has expanded, becoming a motion picture studio in 1979, expanding its activities to TV program production, and producing drama series between 1992 and 1998, along with making subsequent business deals with Piprodia Entertainment. The firm has also produced a variety show. Five Star created a new division, Stadio, a full-service provider for film marketing.

Five Star's film collection comprises about 250 films, made by 70 Thai film directors.
