= Wisit Sasanatieng =

Thai film director and screenwriter

- วิศิษฏ์ ศาสนเที่ยง
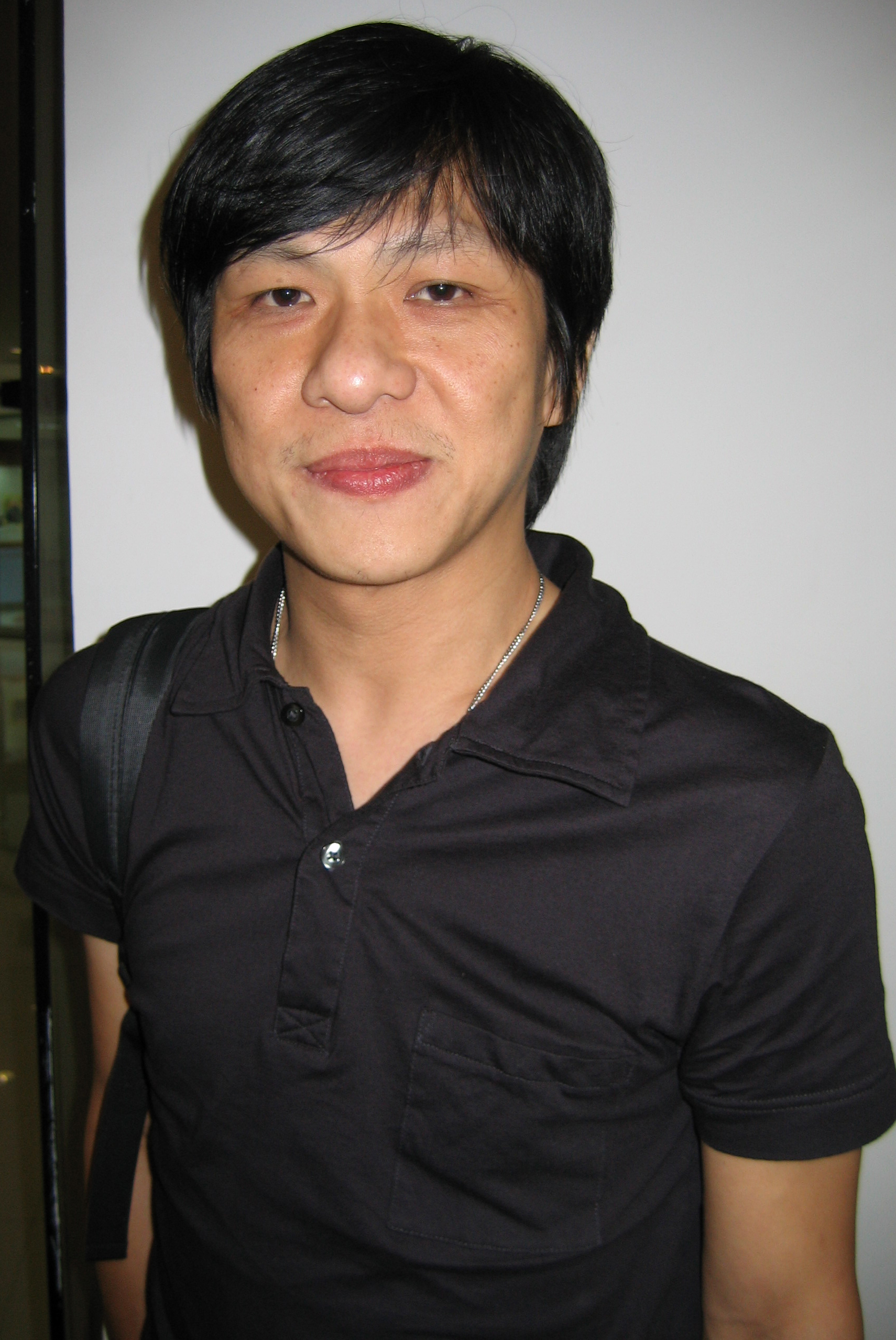
- Wisit at the Thai Film Foundation's Digital Forum in September 2007
- Born: June 28, 1963 (age 62); Bangkok, Thailand
- Other name: Sid
- Occupations: Film director; screenwriter
- Years active: 1997–present
- Notable work: Tears of the Black Tiger
- Spouse: Siripan Techajindawong

Wisit Sasanatieng (Thai: วิศิษฏ์ ศาสนเที่ยง; RTGS: Wisit Satsanathiang; born June 28, 1963) is a Thai film director and screenwriter of Chinese descent. Best known for his colourful debut feature film, Tears of the Black Tiger, he is among a "New Wave" of Thai directors that include Nonzee Nimibutr and Pen-Ek Ratanaruang.

== Biography ==
=== Early career ===
Wisit studied at the Faculty of Decorative Arts at Silpakorn University, where he was a classmate of Nonzee Nimibutr and set designer Ek Lemchuen.

He started out as an art director at the Film Factory, where he worked with Pen-Ek Ratanaruang. Among television commercials directed by Wisit was a colorful commercial for Wrangler Jeans that featured Black Tiger star Chartchai Ngamsuan. Wisit continues to work at Film Factory, making commercials (particularly for the MK Restaurants hot pot chain in Thailand) in order to supplement his income in between making feature films. He also is a cartoonist and illustrator.

Wisit entered the film industry as a screenwriter for two of Nonzee's films, 1997's Dang Bireley's and Young Gangsters, set in 1950s Thailand, and the ghost thriller, Nang Nak in 1999. Critically, and at the box office, the films were successes and marked the beginning of a "new wave" movement in the Thai film industry.

=== Tears of the Black Tiger ===
Wisit's feature-film debut was in 2000 with the colourfully audacious Tears of the Black Tiger, a genre-blending western. With a romantic melodrama at its core, the story involves outlaws, gunfights, horseback riding, comedic bits and big explosions. The film was a homage to an earlier era of Thai film - the contemplative 1950s dramas of pioneering director Rattana Pestonji as well as the "bomb-the-mountains, burn-the-huts" action films of the 1960s that starred Mitr Chaibancha. One of the leading men from the 1960s and 1970s Thai action-film era, Sombat Metanee, lent his talents to Tears of the Black Tiger, portraying the outlaw leader, Fai.

Tears of the Black Tiger was the first Thai film to be screened at the Cannes Film Festival, where it was in 2001's Un Certain Regard program. At the Vancouver International Film Festival in 2000, it won the Dragons & Tigers Award for best new director. Other awards include best art direction at the Gijón International Film Festival in 2001 and a jury prize at the Puchon International Fantastic Film Festival. It was also screened at the 2006 Bangkok International Film Festival as part of a tribute to Sombat Metanee.

US distribution rights for the film were purchased by Miramax Films, which changed the ending and then shelved it indefinitely. In 2006, Magnolia Pictures acquired the US rights to the original version of the film, and gave it a limited theatrical run in US theaters in 2007 before releasing it on DVD.

=== Citizen Dog ===
Wisit's next project, 2004's Citizen Dog, was a contemporary romantic comedy set in Bangkok that proved to be even more colourful than Tears of the Black Tiger. Based on a novel written by Koynuch (Siripan Techajindawong), Wisit's long-time collaborative partner and wife, and narrated by compatriot filmmaker Pen-Ek Ratanaruang, Citizen Dog tells the tale of two rural Thai people who come to Bangkok to find work and fall in love. Critics have compared it to Jean-Pierre Jeunet's Amélie.

Distribution rights outside Asia were purchased by Luc Besson's EuropaCorp, and it played at several film festivals, including the Berlin Film Festival, the Toronto International Film Festival and the San Francisco International Asian American Film Festival. The film screened commercially in France in 2006.

=== The Unseeable ===
In 2006, while he was working to develop some future projects, Wisit directed a low-budget Thai horror film for Five Star Production called The Unseeable (Thai: เปนชู้กับผี).

The Unseeable marked a change for Wisit, who was restrained by budgetary concerns from the stylizations of his first two films. Additionally, The Unseeable was the first film that he directed but did not write, with the screenplay by Kongkiat Khomsiri, one of the "Ronin Team" credited with directing the hit Thai horror thriller, Art of the Devil 2.

While the color palette was considerably muted, compared to Tears of the Black Tiger and Citizen Dog, Wisit was still able to leave his nostalgic imprint on The Unseeable by making it an homage to films of the 1930s and the stars of that era, including Bette Davis and Joan Crawford.

Thai pop culture influences came from illustrator Hem Vejakorn, who wrote a series of 10-satang graphic novel ghost stories in the 1930s and '40s. The reference was so striking that the Barom Khru Foundation, which claims to supervise Hem's works, issued a statement warning Five Star Production to not violate the copyright of Hem's work. However, Wisit said the film was not an adaptation of any of Hem's works but was generally inspired by Hem's style., which completed shooting in August 2006 and was released on November 2, 2006.

In addition to a release in Thailand, The Unseeable also had wide theatrical releases in Malaysia and Singapore, and screened at several film festivals, including the Brussels International Festival of Fantasy Film, 2007 Bangkok International Film Festival (ASEAN competition) and the Cinemanila International Film Festival.

Also in 2006, Pen-Ek became the third recipient of the Silpathorn Award for Filmmaking, an honor given to contemporary Thai artists by the Ministry of Culture's Office of Contemporary Art and Culture.

=== Norasinghavatar, Red Eagle ===
In 2007, Wisit participated in the Short Films Project in Commemoration of the Celebration on the Auspicious Occasion of His Majesty the King's 80th Birthday Anniversary, in which nine short films were made in honor of King Bhumibol Adulyadej. Other directors participating the project included fellow Silpathorn Award winners Pen-Ek Ratanaruang and Apichatpong Weerasethakul and veteran filmmaker Bhandit Rittakol.

Wisit contributed Norasinghavatar, which featured his trademark colorful and highly stylized imagery, with a blend of khon masked dance and Thai two-handed swordplay. Though the film appears to be 3D animation, it is actually live action, but completely stylized with super-saturated colors in post-production.

Wisit was given a budget of 400,000 baht (about US$10,000), but his project's cost ballooned to 3 million, due to the special effects and post-production costs. "It's a bad habit – I can't control the money," he said in an interview.

Also in 2007, at the American Film Market, it was announced that Wisit's next project for Five Star Production would be Red Eagle, a reboot of a 1960s Thai film series that starred Mitr Chaibancha as a masked superhero crimefighter. The film series ended in tragedy when Mitr was killed in 1970 during the making of Golden Eagle. The new film was reportedly to begin production in March 2008 and would star Ananda Everingham in the title role.

=== Projects in development ===
In 2005, when Luc Besson's EuropaCorp picked up Citizen Dog for distribution, the company also agreed to co-produce with Five Star Production a long-gestating project by Wisit called Nam Prix, which takes its name after red chilies used in Thai cooking. A historical fantasy about Thai pirates, the project began in 1998 as a one-page brief, but was shelved due to financial difficulties.

While Citizen Dog was told in the contemporary style of filmmaking, and Tears of the Black Tiger portrayed an old Thai film style, Wisit has said he will endeavor to go back even further with Nam Prix, capturing the tradition of Thai temple painting and bring it to life.

"It will be an antique Thai legend, with very traditional Thai pictures like the old wall painting. But we will animate them," he was quoted as saying on ThaiCinema.org. "We will make them move. It is not an epic, but a folklore in order to tell our roots, our culture."

As of 2007, pre-production work had been completed on Nam Prix, with Five Star Production awaiting Besson's EuropaCorp to provide its 50% of the budget needed to get filming under way.

In March 2006 another project was announced for Wisit: a Chinese-language martial arts film called Armful, which is a revenge tale about a man who loses his arm. A gifted illustrator and comic-book artist, Wisit produced conceptual poster art for the film, which he said would be influenced by Hong Kong action cinema of the 1960s and 1970s, particularly the One-Armed Swordsman films and Master of the Flying Guillotine featuring Jimmy Wang Yu as a one-armed fighter. Armful was initially announced by Singapore-based One Ton Cinema, which received a further pledge of backing from Hong Kong actor Andy Lau's Focus Films.

Regarding Armful, Wisit issued the following statement:

This will be the first time ever I’ll be directing a film from abroad. The film is in a language that I don’t speak so I am nervous but curious at the same time. However, there are a couple of things that engaged me about Armful. Firstly, the script presents, potentially, a new genre of martial arts and action – one that I think I’ve never seen before. It will allow me to create something new, very new! Armful also has elements and themes that will let me pay homage to classic wuxia films from the seventies era – which are amongst my all time favorites. Lastly and most importantly, it’s because of what the producer said to me: 'This is not a Thai, Chinese or Singaporean film. It is a Southeast Asian film. One that will show, collectively, who we are to the world.'

However, as of 2007, the project was on indefinite hold, awaiting more funding.

== Awards ==
- 2000 – Dragons and Tigers Award, Vancouver International Film Festival, Tears of the Black Tiger
- 2006 – Critics Prize, Deauville Asian Film Festival, Citizen Dog
- 2006 – Silver Prize for Most Groundbreaking Film, Bronze Prize for Best Asian Film, Fantasia Festival, Citizen Dog
- 2006 – Silpathorn Award for Filmmaking, Office of Contemporary Arts and Culture, Thailand Ministry of Culture
- 2007 – NETPAC Award, Taipei Golden Horse Film Festival, The Unseeable

== Filmography ==
- Dang Bireley's and Young Gangsters (2499 Antapan Krong Muang) (1997) (screenwriter)
- Nang Nak (1999) (screenwriter)
- Tears of the Black Tiger (Fah Talai Jone) (2000)
- Citizen Dog (Mah Nakhon) (2004)
- The Unseeable (2006)
- Norasinghavatar (Short Films Project in Commemoration of the Celebration on the Auspicious Occasion of His Majesty the King's 80th Birthday Anniversary, 2007)
- The Red Eagle (2010)
- Armful (in development)
- Nam Prix (in development)
- Senior (2015)
- 10 Years Thailand (2018)
- Reside (สิงสู่, Singsoo) (2018)
- The Whole Truth (2021) (released on Netflix)
- The Murderer (2023) (released on Netflix)
