= World Film Festival of Bangkok =

- Location: Bangkok, Thailand
- Hosted by: Nation Group
- Festival date: December 2-December 11, 2022
- Language: English, Thai
- Website: www.worldfilmbangkok.com

The World Film Festival of Bangkok (Thai: เทศกาลภาพยนตร์โลกแห่งกรุงเทพฯ) is an annual international film festival held in Bangkok, Thailand.

The 15th World Film Festival of Bangkok, the latest edition of the film festival, was held from December 2 to December 11, 2022.

== History ==
Nation Multimedia Group, a media company based in Thailand, organised the first Bangkok Film Festival in the country in 1998. Various international films were screened to promote cinematic art and film appreciation in the nation. The event was held annually until 2002. The Tourism Authority of Thailand became the main organizer and changed the name to the Bangkok International Film Festival.

Since 2003, the Film Festival has been held annually in October by the Nation Multimedia Group with Mr Kriengsak Victor Silakong as the festival director.

The 1st World Film Festival of Bangkok 2003 was held at the Grand EGV Theatre, Siam Discovery from October 17–26 with more than 80 international films both from young talent and cinema masters. The Retrospective presented the works of Fritz Lang, Satyajit Ray, Jean Cocteau and Werner Herzog along with screening of more than 10 Indian films. The Best Feature went to "Swimming Pool" from France. The jurors included Jiří Menzel, a Czech film legend and Naowarat Pongpaiboon, a Thai National Artist in Literature Art.

In 2004, the Lotus Award was given for the first time to people who had devoted their careers to the film industry. The first honouree was Thai comedy master Dokdin Kanyamarn. Additionally, Mr. Tui, Dokdin's famous comedy, was remastered with English subtitles. This film was also presented in the "Masters of Comedy" program with films from world-renowned masters such as Jacques Tati, Charles Chapin, Terry Gilliam as well as Jackie Chan with his documentary film "Traces of a Dragon: Jackie Chan and his Lost Family".

The event also focused on seminars and activities by co-operating with the Hubert Bals Fund of the International Film Festival Rotterdam and the Fonds Sud Cinéma from France, to hold a discussion to guide film producers seeking international funds for their film projects. It also arranged a film rating system workshop that allowed the participants to categorize films shown at the festival.

After the workshop, the rating system was introduced to all films shown at the 3rd World Film Festival of Bangkok 2005. It also held a workshop on fundraising for new film projects with the support of the Festival of Three Continents from Nantes, France and Produire Au Sud. At the end of the workshop, the most interesting film projects in Southeast Asia were selected to receive funds and were invited to the final selection in France. This was the 2nd Produire au Sud Bangkok.

The 2005 festival featured the "Tsunami Digital Short Films". Both Thai and international film-makers were given s budget from the Ministry of Cultural Office of Contemporary Art and Culture to make short films as a memorial tribute on the first anniversary of the tsunami disaster. Mr Kriengsak Silakong was an executive producer of the project. It included the works of a number of Thai directors, Apichatpong Weerasethakul, Thunska Pansittivorakul, Pramote Sangsorn, Lek Manont, Naowarat Saowanich, Pipope Panitchpakdi, Santi Taepanich, Pimpaka Towira, Somkid Thamniamdi, Sompot Chidgasornpongse and Suchada Sirithanawuddhi and Christelle Lheureux from France, Folke Ryden from Sweden and Margaret Bong Chew Jen from Malaysia. The short films were premiered at both this festival and many other international film festivals around the world.

Highlights in 2005 included the special guest and Academy Award-winning Polish film director Roman Polanski, who attended the festival for the Lotus Award presentation. His film Oliver Twist was the opening film. Other highlights were the film screenings from the Czechoslovak New Wave and Turkish films. Focus and the Retrospective of the films of Ulrike Ottinger and Jean-Pierre Jeunet. War and Peace, a seven-hour epic film based on the eponymous book, was shown and attracted great interest.

The Best Feature 2005 went to the Sri Lankan film The Forsaken Land by Vimukthi Jayasundara and led to a provocative and lively discussion as to the facts shown in the film.

With the support of the Polish Embassy, the 4th World Film Festival of Bangkok 2006 presented a Retrospective of the late and legendary Polish director Krzysztof Kieślowski and included his hard-to-find works like The Calm, Short Working Day and The Underground Passage. Special events featured the poster exhibition of artist and designer Rafał Olbiński, who was one of the jurors.

The festival opened with the Chinese big-budget movie The Banquet from the director Feng Xiaogang before its wide release in Thailand. Additionally, it won the People's Choice Award.

The 5th World Film Festival of Bangkok 2007 was held at the Esplanade Cineplex with the concept "Catch the Feeling". The festival continued to retain its emphasis on vigorous and enthusiastic international films from various cultures, together with special activities. This festival was honoured by The European Union Film Festival joining the event with its best 20 European feature films.

The 2007 film festival as it co-operated with MCOT Public Company Limited to hold a short film competition open to the public. Students focused on "Father" and "The World through My Eyes", based on the poem of the 2007 S.E.A. Write Award winner Montri Sriyong respectively.

The activity "From Books to Celluloid" featured talks on Butterfly and Flowers with the writer Nippan and the director Euthana Mukdasanit, and "Conversation with Suchart Sawadsri" with this prominent writer for his debut of short films "Personal Histories" which also screened at the festival.

The 2007 Lotus Award was presented to Euthana Mukdasanit, while the Best Feature was "Import/Export" from Austria. The People's Choice Award was discontinued.

In 2008, the festival's theme was "No Movies, No Life". Held at Siam Paragon, it opened with the romantic drama A Moment in June, which had been the first film selected from the Produire Au Sud Bangkok workshop. Martin Scorsese's Shine a Light was the closing film. Around 80 films were shown, with a retrospective on Derek Jarman, tribute to Héctor Babenco and five films by Shyam Benegal, recipient of the 2008 Lotus Award. The Harvest of Talents competition was suspended.

After the 2017 edition, the festival has stopped for 5 years. The festival returns in 2022 for its 15th edition. Film producer and film festival programmer Donsaron Kovitvanitcha has been appointed to be its new festival director.

== Awards ==
With an emphasis on predominantly independent films from mostly emerging directors, the festival's competition section is the Harvest of Talents. Awards are given for best feature, best director, best script and best artistic direction, though from year to year, jurors are given flexibility of changing the categories, depending on the merits of the selected films. For example, one year there might be a Best Cinematography award, but not in other years. In 2007, the jury did not want to give an award for best script, and the artistic direction award was changed to "artistic creativity." The jury is also free to give special jury awards. A People's Choice Award goes to the film with highest attendance, and is open to all films in the festival. Non-competitive sections of the festival include Aean Cinema, Asian Contemporary, Documentary, Retrospective, Tribute, World Cinema and Short Film.

In 2004, the festival give its first Lotus Award, given to veteran filmmakers for lifetime achievement. The first honoree was Thai actor-director Dokdin Kanyamarn. Subsequent honorees have included Roman Polanski, Euthana Mukdasanit and Shyam Benegal.

In 2005, the festival initiated its Produire Au Sud (Producing in the South) project, in cooperation with the Festival of Three Continents, which seeks to provide funding to independent film producers to start new film projects.

The Harvest of Talents competition was suspended in 2008.

== Particular years ==
=== 1st World Film Festival of Bangkok (2003) ===
==== Harvest of Talents competition ====
Jury members were Jiří Menzel (filmmaker, Czech Republic), Guy de la Chevalerie (French Embassy cultural conseller, France), Dr. Hans-Peter Rodenberg (Germany), K.S.Sasidharam (Director of National Film Archive of India, PUNE, India), Naovarat Pongpaiboon (Thailand National Artist for literature, Thailand), Nick Palevsky (film specialist, United States)

===== Films in competition =====
- Anaahat (Amol Palekar, India)
- Arimpara (Murali Nair, India)
- It's Easier for a Camel (Valeria Bruni Tedeschi, France)
- Last Life in the Universe (Pen-Ek Ratanaruang, Thailand)
- Spring Subway (Zhang Yibai, China)
- Stormy Weather (Pedro Olea, Spain)
- Swimming Pool (François Ozon, France)
- The Wind Bird (Inoka Sathyangan, Sri Lanka)

===== Awards =====
- Best Feature: Swimming Pool
- Best Script: Swimming Pool
- Best Art Direction: Anaahat
- Jury's Prize: Last Life in the Universe
- People's Choice Award: Russian Ark (Russia)

=== 2nd World Film Festival of Bangkok (2004) ===
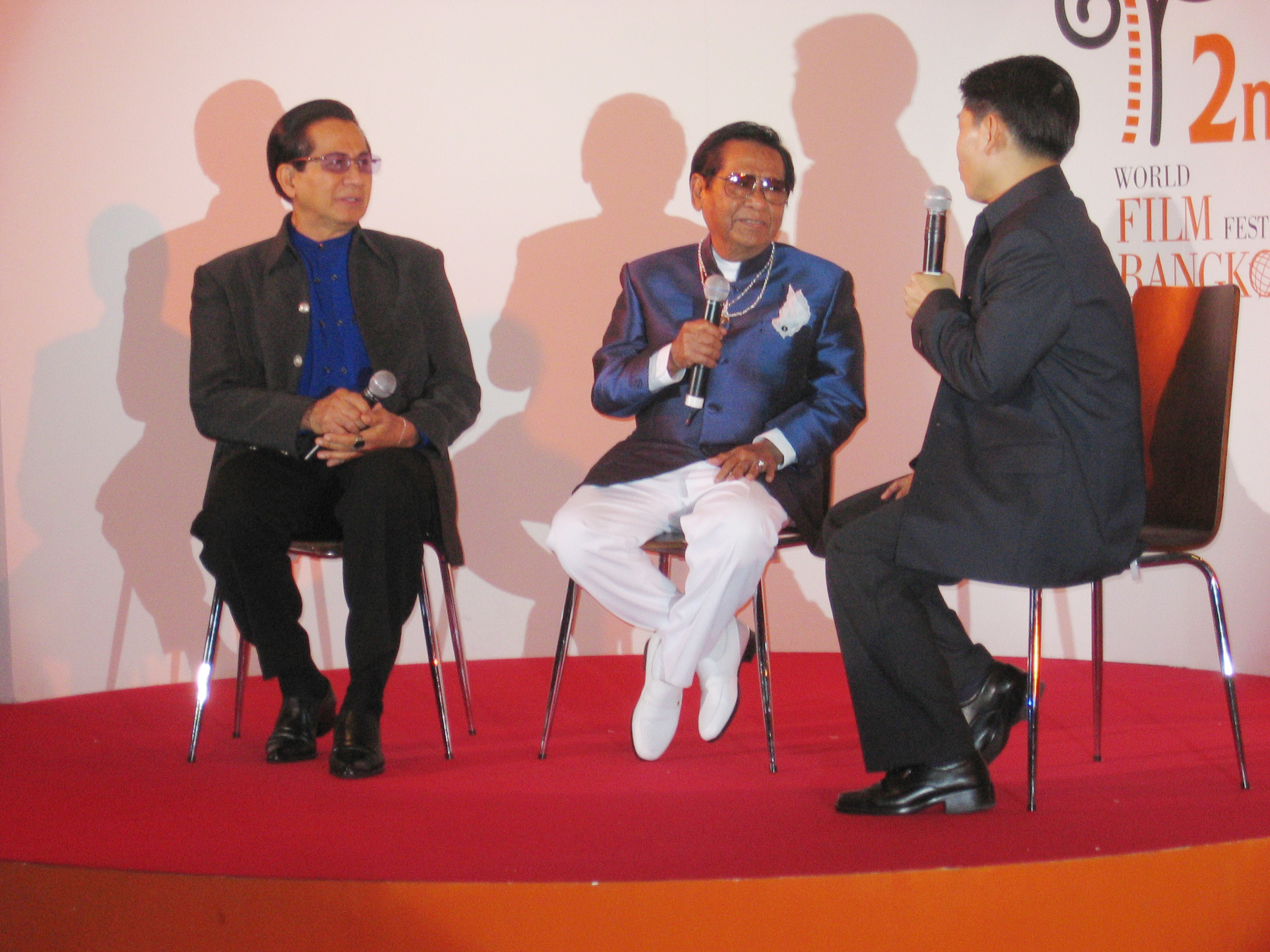
Thai actor Sombat Metanee and actor-director Dokdin Kanyamarn are interviewed during "Thai Night" festivities at the World Film Festival of Bangkok. Dokdin's 1970s musical comedy, Ai Tui, starring Sombat and Petchara Chaowarat was screened that night.

==== Harvest of Talents competition ====
Jury members were Prof. Surapone Virulrak (Dean, Faculty of Communication Arts, Chulalongkorn University, Thailand), Andreas Strohl (Director of Munich Filmfest, Executive Director of International Munchner Filmwochen GmbH, Managing Director of International Festival of Film Schools Munich, Germany), Christian Jeune (Director of Film Department, Cannes Film Festival, France), Renen Schorr (Founder-Director of the Sam Spiegel Film & TV School, Jerusalem, Israel), Vincent Wang (film producer, Taiwan)

===== Films =====
- Aviv (Tomer Heymann, Israel)
- Lost Embrace (Daniel Burman, Argentina)
- Suite Habana (Fernando Perez, Cuba)
- Seaward Journey (Guillermo Casanova, Uruguay)
- Or (Keren Yedaya, Cinema of Israel)
- The Edukators (Hans Weingartner, Germany)
- Breath of Fresh Air (Sandeep Sawant, India)
- The Fifth Reaction (Tahmineh Milani, Iran)
- Honey Baby (Mika Kaurismäki, Finland)

===== Awards =====
- Best Feature: Lost Embrace
- Best Script: The Edukators
- Best Art Direction: Seaward Journey
- Jury's Prize: Aviv
- People's Choice Award: Torremolinos 73 (Spain)
- Lotus Award: Dokdin Kanyamarn

=== 3rd World Film Festival of Bangkok (2005) ===
Held from October 14 to 24. Special guests included Roman Polanski (with a retrospective of his films) and the premiere of the Tsunami Digital Short Films, curated by Apichatpong Weerasethakul.

==== Harvest of Talents competition ====
Jury members were Nadine Tarbouriech (Film Editor, France), Robert Haliday (film critic, USA), Grittiya Gaweewong (art curator, Thailand), Sonthaya Subyen (Film Programmer, DK Film House, Thailand), Michal Bregant (Dean of Prague Film Academy, Czech Republic)

===== Films =====
- Forsaken Land (Vimukthi Jayasundara, Sri Lanka)
- One Night (Niki Karimi, Iran)
- Live Your Dream (Peter Lichtefeid, Germany)
- 4 (Ilya Khrzhanovsky, Russia)
- Battle in Heaven (Carlos Reygadas, Mexico)
- Days of Santiago (Josue Mendez, Peru)
- Grand Voyage (Ismael Ferrouji, Morocco)
- Angel's Fall (Semih Kaplanoglu, Turkey)
- The Moustache (Emmanuel Carrere, France)
- Turn Left at the End of the World (Avi Nesher, Israel)

===== Awards =====
- Best Feature: Forsaken Land
- Best Script: Days of Santiago
- Best Art Direction: 4
- Jury's Prize: Turn Left at the End of the World
- People's Choice Award: Grand Voyage
- Lotus Award: Roman Polanski

=== 4th World Film Festival of Bangkok (2006) ===
Held from October 11 to 23 at Paragon Cineplex, Major Cineplex Central World and Grand EGV. Special guests included Polish poster designer Rafal Olbinski, who also was on the Harvest of Talents jury. Other jurors were Thai film critic Anchalee Chaiworaporn, Austrian director Titus Leber, Iranian director Tahmineh Milani and Turkish actress Meltem Cumbul. The festival opened with the Chinese film The Banquet and closed with the Russian silent classic The Battleship Potemkin.

==== Harvest of Talents competition ====
===== Films =====
- 12:08 East of Bucharest (, Romania, 2006), directed by Corneliu Porumboiu
- Chicha tu madre (Peru/Argentina, 2006), directed by Gianfranco Quattrini
- Climates (Turkey, 2006), directed by Nuri Bilge Ceylan
- Close to Home (Israel, 2005), directed by Dalia Hager and Vidi Bilu
- Isabella (Hong Kong, 2006), directed by Pang Ho-Cheung
- Ode to Joy (Poland, 2005), directed by Anna Kazejak-Dawid, Jan Komasa and Maciej Migas
- Seeds of Doubt (Germany, 2005), directed by Samir Nasr
- The Right of the Weakest (Belgium, 2006), directed by Lucas Belvaux

===== Awards =====
- Best Feature: Isabella
- Best Cinematography: Climates
- Best Script: Seeds of Doubt
- Jury's Prize: 12:08 East of Bucharest
- People's Choice Award: The Banquet (China, 2006), directed by Feng Xiaogang

=== 5th World Film Festival of Bangkok (2007) ===
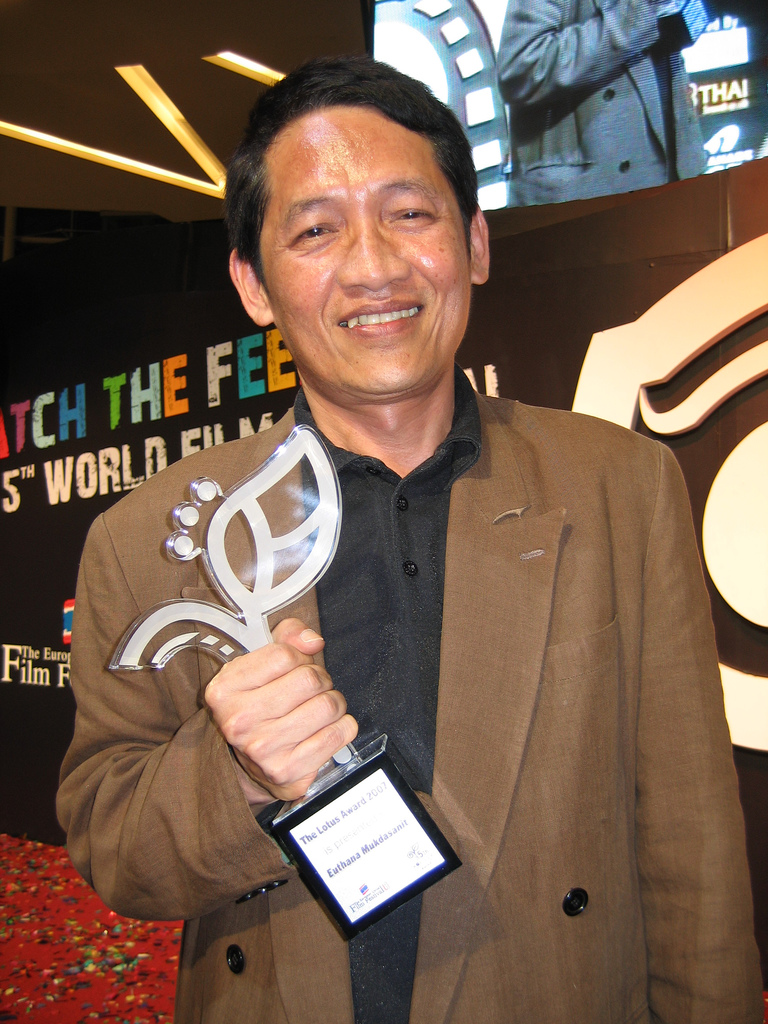
Thai film director Euthana Mukdasanit with his Lotus Award for lifetime achievement at the 5th World Film Festival of Bangkok.

The 5th World Film Festival of Bangkok was held from October 25 to November 4 at the Esplanade Cineplex. The opening film was Genghis Khan: To the Ends of the Earth and Sea, a Japanese-Mongolian co-production directed by Shinichiro Sawai, who was present for the screening. The closing film was Secret directed by and starring Jay Chou.

A tribute section featured the films of Taiwanese actress, director, screenwriter and producer Sylvia Chang, who was present for the festival, and a retrospective was on the films of Percy Adlon. The annual European Union Film Festival, organized by the European Commission in Thailand since 1990, joined the World Film Festival with its own program.

==== Harvest of Talents competition ====
Jury members were German cinematographer-director Fred Kelemen, Thai director Ittisoontorn Vichailak, Bangkok-based Danish painter Elizabeth Romhild, Thai critic Niwat Kongpian and Kulthep Narula, executive director of Benetone Film Company.

===== Films =====
- 4 Elements (Netherlands, 2006), directed by Jiska Rickels
- 881 (Singapore, 2007), directed by Royston Tan
- The Band's Visit (Israel/France, 2007), directed by Eran Kolirin
- Egg (Turkey, 2007), directed by Semih Kaplanoğlu
- Help Me Eros (Taiwan, 2007), directed by Lee Kang-sheng
- Import Export (Austria, 2006), directed by Ulrich Seidl
- Love Songs (France, 2007), directed by Christophe Honoré
- Phantom Love (United States, 2007), directed by Nina Menkes
- Possible Lives (Argentina, 2006), directed by Sandra Gugliotta
- Tokyo Tower – Mom & Me, and Sometimes Dad (Japan, 2007), directed by Joji Matsuoka

===== Awards =====
Jurors altered the awards selection, omitted the best script award, and changing the name of the artistic direction award to "artistic achievement". Additionally, the "People's Choice" award for film with best attendance was discontinued.

- Best film: Import Export (Austria, 2006), directed by Ulrich Seidl
- Best artistic achievement: Phantom Love (United States, 2007), directed by Nina Menkes
- Best director: Semih Kaplanoğlu, director of Egg (Turkey, 2007)
- Special jury awards:
  - Help Me Eros (Taiwan, 2007), directed by Lee Kang-sheng
  - The Band's Visit (Israel/France, 2007), directed by Eran Kolirin
- Lotus Award: Euthana Mukdasanit

=== 6th World Film Festival of Bangkok (2008) ===
Held from October 24 to November 1, 2008, the festival's theme was "No Movies, No Life" and it was held at Siam Paragon. The opening film was the romantic drama A Moment in June, which had been the first film selected from the Produire Au Sud Bangkok workshop. Martin Scorsese's Shine a Light was the closing film, shown outdoors in a rock concert-like setting. Around 80 films were shown, with a retrospective on Derek Jarman, a tribute to Héctor Babenco and sections for World Cinema, Asian Contemporary, Documentary and short films.

==== Awards ====
The Harvest of Talents competition was suspended.

Lotus Award:

Shyam Benegal

Thai Short Film Competition

Winner:

- Hongsa's Schoolbag

Director: Supamok Silarak

Runner:

- Way to Blue

Director: Supawadee Sriputorn

Juries Award:

- Made in Heaven

Director: Amorn Harinnitisuk

- Croc

Director: Saravuth Intaraprom

=== 10th World Film Festival of Bangkok (2012) ===
Held from November 16 to 25, 2012 at the Esplanade Cineplex. The festival opened with the Thai film Mekong Hotel directed by Apichatpong Weerasethakul.

=== 11th World Film Festival of Bangkok (2013) ===
Held from November 15 to 24, 2013. The festival opened with The Rocket and closed with the Thai film By the River (สายน้ำติดเชื้อ : Sai Nam Tid Shoer) directed by Nontawat Numbenchapol.

=== 12th World Film Festival of Bangkok (2014) ===
Held from October 17 to 26, 2014 at the CentralWorld. The festival opened with the Thai film Somboom and closed with The Tale of the Princess Kaguya.

=== 13th World Film Festival of Bangkok (2015) ===
Held from November 13 to 22, 2015 at the CentralWorld. The festival opened with the Thai film Snap directed by Kongdej Jaturanrasamee and closed with Suffragette.

=== 14th World Film Festival of Bangkok (2016) ===
Held from January 23 to February 1, 2017, has been postponed from November 4–13, 2016 due to the Death of Bhumibol Adulyadej. The festival's theme was "Travelling Through Films" and it was held at CentralWorld. The opening film was The Red Turtle.

==== Awards ====
Lotus Award: Oliver Stone

=== 15th World Film Festival of Bangkok (2022) ===
This latest edition of World Film Festival of Bangkok held from December 2–11, 2022. After Kriengsak Silakong died in March 2022, Nation Group has appointed film producer and film festival programmer Donsaron Kovitvanitcha to be its new festival director. The festival's theme was "Return to Cinema", with top films from more than 30 countries and it was held at CentralWorld. The festival opened with Malaysian-Indonesian thriller film Stone Turtle directed by Woo Ming Jin and close with Belgian film Close directed by Lukas Dhont and Thai film 'Arnold is a Model Student', directed by Sorayos Prapapan.

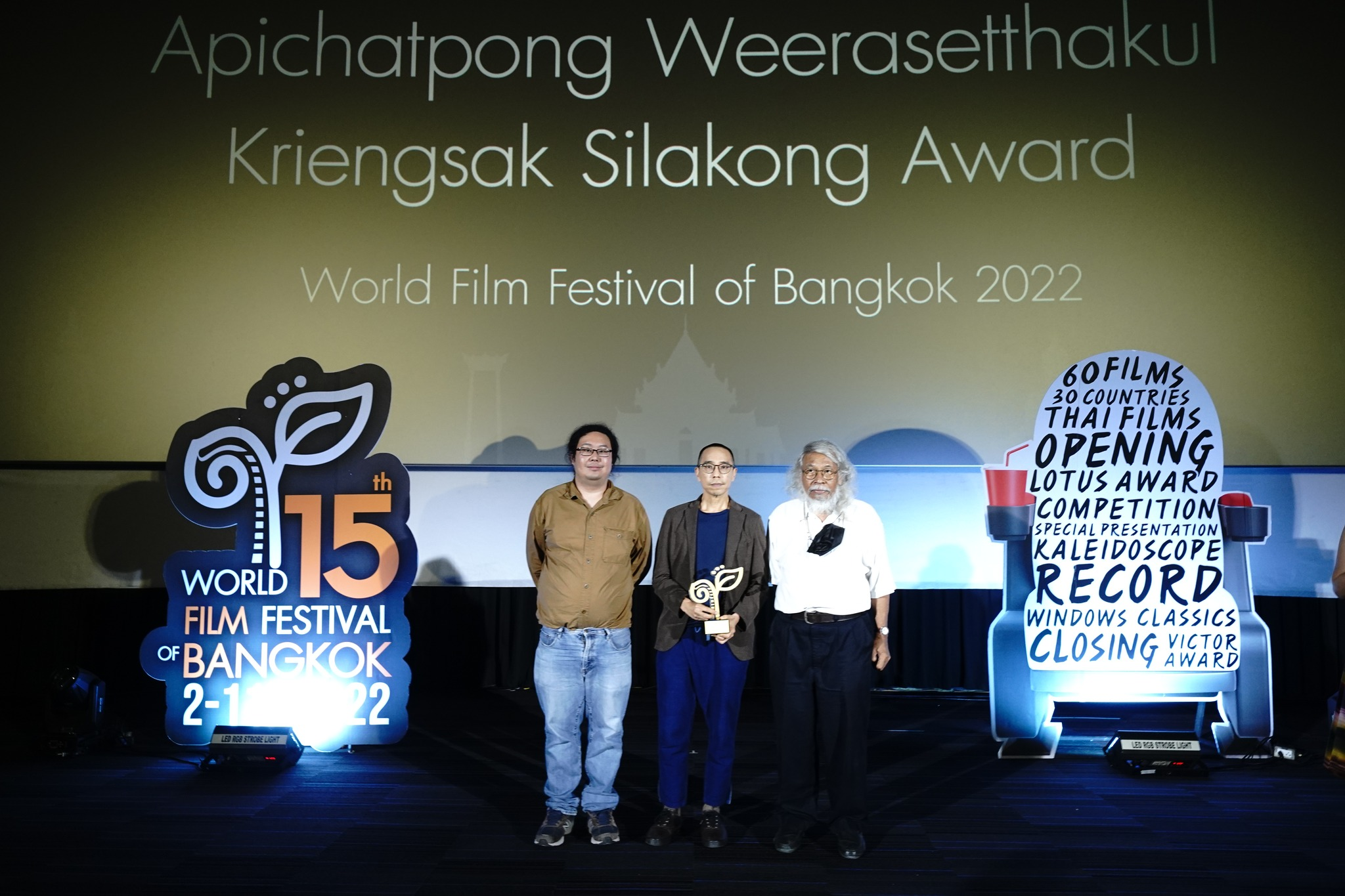
Apichatpong Weerasethakul received Kriengsak Silakong Award at the 15th World Film Festival of Bangkok from Dome Sukvong, ex-director of Thai Film Archive and Donsaron Kovitvanitcha, festival director of World Film Festival of Bangkok.

==== Awards ====
Lotus Award for Best Film: Klondike (Ukraine, 2022), directed by Maryna Er Gorbach

Best Director: Have You Seen This Woman? (Serbia, 2022), directed by Dusan Zoric and Marija Gluscevic

Grand Jury Prize: Scala (Thailand, 2022), directed by Ananta Thitanat

Jury Prize for Best Screenplay: Victim (Slovak Republic, 2022) directed by Michal Blasko and Stonewalling (Japan, 2022) directed by Huang Ji and Ryûji Otsuka

Jury Prize for Best Ensemble: Joyland (Pakistan-US, 2022) directed by Saim Sadiq

Jury Prize for Technical Achievement for Cinematography and Editing: Autobiography (Indonesia, 2022) directed by Makbul Mubarak

Kriengsak Silakong Award: Apichatpong Weerasethakul

== See also ==
- Bangkok International Film Festival
- Cinema of Thailand
- List of cinemas in Thailand
- Thai Short Film and Video Festival
