= Chatathip Chutrakul =

- ชฎาทิพ จูตระกูล
- Born: 1961 (age 64–65); Bangkok, Thailand
- Occupation: Business executive
- Employer: Siam Piwat
- Known for: Chief executive officer of Siam Piwat
- Spouse: Apichat Chutrakul
- Children: Chayapa Chutrakul
- Parent(s): Chalermchai Charuvastr; Ladda Jaruwat

Chatathip Chutrakul (Thai: ชฎาทิพ จูตระกูล; born 1961) is a Thai business executive who is the chief executive officer of Siam Piwat. She is currently operating shopping complexes including Siam Paragon, Siam Center, Siam Discovery, and ICONSIAM.

== Early life and education ==
Chutrakul is the youngest daughter of Lieutenant General Chalermchai Charuvastr and physician Ladda Jaruwat. She was born in Bangkok. She graduated from Chulalongkorn University with a bachelor's degree in accounting. She later studied insurance in the United Kingdom and worked in oil and gas insurance before returning to Thailand.

She joined Siam Center in 1986, initially working in its accounting department. She later moved to sales promotion and public relations. After more than ten years with the company, she became managing director of Siam Piwat in 1996.

== Career ==
Chutrakul became managing director of Siam Piwat in 1996. The company operates Siam Center and Siam Discovery and developed Siam Paragon in partnership with The Mall Group. It also developed Paradise Park in partnership with MBK.

Forbes Thailand reported that Siam Piwat used different concepts for its shopping centers. Chutrakul said that Siam Paragon, Siam Discovery and Siam Center were intended to provide different experiences and that the company adapted its projects to their customers. She also said that the company did not use a target increase in revenue as the starting point for developing a new project.

=== ICONSIAM ===
Chutrakul was involved in the development of ICONSIAM, a mixed-use project on the Chao Phraya River in Bangkok. Siam Piwat partnered with Magnolia Quality Development Corporation on the project. The two companies each held a 25% stake, while Siam Piwat held the remaining 50%.

Forbes Thailand reported in 2016 that the project had an estimated investment of US$1.57 billion. Plans included retail space, two residential towers, a museum, a riverside walkway, spaces for the arts, a convention center and a theater.

The project marked Siam Piwat's expansion from the Siam area to the Thonburi side of the Chao Phraya River. Siam Piwat partnered with Magnolia Quality Development because the latter had experience in residential development.

=== National Soft Power Strategy Committee ===
In September 2023, Chutrakul was appointed to the National Soft Power Strategy Committee, chaired by Prime Minister Srettha Thavisin. Thavisin is a cousin of Chutrakul's husband, Apichat Chutrakul.

On 3 October 2023, while attending the committee's first meeting, Chutrakul left the meeting after learning of the shooting at Siam Paragon and went to follow the situation at the shopping centre. The following day, she expressed condolences to the victims and injured and thanked customers, business partners and staff for their cooperation during the evacuation.

== Recognition ==
In 2014, Chutrakul was selected by Forbes Asia as one of its 50 influential women in Asia's economy and business.

In 2024, she was included in Fortune's 100 Most Powerful Women Asia list.

== Personal life ==
Chutrakul is married to Apichat Chutrakul, a chairman of Sansiri. They have one daughter, Chayapa Chutrakul, who is the chief executive officer of The Pink Lab Co., Ltd.
