= Tongpan =

- Cover of the 2006 VCD release.
- Directed by: Euthana Mukdasanit; Surachai Jantimatorn; Paijong Laisagoon; Rassamee Phaoluangthong
- Written by: Khamsing Srinawk; Paijong Laisagoon; Mike Morrow
- Produced by: The Isan Film Group
- Starring: Ong-art Ponethon
- Cinematography: Frank Green
- Edited by: Paijong Laisagoon
- Music by: Surachai Jantimatorn
- Distributed by: Concord Films Council Ltd.
- Release date: 1976
- Running time: 63 minutes
- Country: Thailand
- Languages: Thai; Lao

Tongpan (Thai: ทองปาน) is a 1976 Thai 16 mm black-and-white docudrama that re-creates a seminar that took place in Northeast Thailand in 1975 to discuss the proposed Pa-Mong Dam on the Mekong. Interwoven are sequences depicting a poor farmer, Tongpan, who had lost his land to another dam some years before, and his struggles to make ends meet. Because of the film's socialist message and suspected communist sympathies of the filmmakers, it was banned by the Thai government. The 63-minute film was released on VCD in Thailand in 2006.

== Synopsis ==
It is just after 1973 democracy movement and university students from Bangkok are going to rural Thailand to talk to farmers about their cause. Among the farmers the students meet is Tongpan, a father of two children with a wife, eking out a living on rented farmland.

Years before, Tongpan had his own farm, but lost it when a dam was built. Now, a bigger dam is to be built on the Mekong. The students urge Tongpan to attend a seminar about the dam proposal and share his experience.

The seminar is attended by government officials, foreign experts, young intellectuals and local farmers. Various opinions are shared, both for and against the massive Pa-Mong Dam.

Tongpan, meanwhile, is struggling to earn a living on his small, rented patch of land. There is not enough water to grow a decent rice crop and fishstocks are dwindling. Tongpan and his wife have two boys, one still an infant. Food is so scarce, that Tongpan's wife falls ill with tuberculosis and cannot breastfeed the boy. He is paid a total of US$100 for a year of watching his landlord's chickens, and cannot hope to borrow more money to buy food for his family.

Tongpan attends the seminar, but the hardships at home weigh heavily on him, and when it comes time for him to speak, he has already gone home.

== Cast ==
- Ong-art Ponethon as Tongpan
- Khamsing Srinork as Academic at seminar
- Peter Bell as Hydro-electricity expert at seminar
- Surachai Jantimatorn as Minstrel
- Sulak Sivaraksa

== Production ==
The filmmakers were a group of such students involved in the 1973 democracy movement, and included folk musician Surachai Jantimatorn of the songs-for-life band Caravan and director Euthana Mukdasanit.

The film was based on actual events that had occurred in 1975, and was made in Nakhon Ratchasima Province. The actor who portrayed Tongpan, Ong-art Ponethon, was a farmer and former Muay Thai boxer. He went on to act in the Vichit Kounavudhi film Son of the Northeast.
