= DNU (disambiguation) =

DNU or Dnu may refer to:

- The New University Hospital (DNU), the largest single hospital in Denmark
- Dnipro National University
- DAT LT (ICAO airline code: DNU)
- ISO 639:dnu, the ISO 639-3 code for Danau language
- Necessity and Urgency Decree (in Spanish, "Decreto de necesidad y urgencia"), a special kind of order issued by the President of Argentina
- Dnu Huntrakul, a prominent Thai composer and chamber musician
