= Chalermchai =

Chalermchai (Thai: เฉลิมชัย, RTGS: Chaloemchai) is a Thai masculine given name. People with the name include:

- Chalermchai Charuvastr (1916–2009), army general, hotelier and business executive
- Chalermchai Kositpipat (born 1955), painter and National Artist
- Chalermchai Sitthisart (born 1957), former Commander-in-chief of the Royal Thai Army
- Chalermchai Sri-on (born 1965), politician and former government minister
