= Butterfly and Flowers =

- The theatrical poster.
- Directed by: Euthana Mukdasanit
- Screenplay by: Euthana Mukdasanit
- Based on: Butterfly and Flowers by Nipphan
- Produced by: Yuwadi Thaihiran
- Starring: Suriya Yaowasang; Wasana Pholyiam
- Cinematography: Panya Nimchareonpong
- Edited by: Worapa Kasemsri
- Music by: Dnu Huntrakul
- Production company: Five Star Production
- Release date: 4 August 1985
- Running time: 127 minutes
- Country: Thailand
- Languages: Thai; Pak Tai

Butterfly and Flowers (Thai: ผีเสื้อและดอกไม้; RTGS: Phisuea Lae Dokmai) is a 1985 Thai drama film directed and co-written by Euthana Mukdasanit, set in Muslim-majority southern Thailand. The film was screened at the 1985 Hawaii International Film Festival, one of the earliest Thai films to gain exposure outside Thailand.

The film is adapted from a 1978 novel of the same title by Nipphan (Makut Oradee), which won the award at the Thailand National Book Fair. The book has become a required reading for secondary schoolchildren in Thailand. Regarded as one of the best Thai films ever made, aside from exposing Thai audiences to regional poverty, the 1985 movie broke new ground by portraying a Buddhist-Muslim romance. Butterfly and Flower delighted the Thai public when it earned a Best Film award at the 1986 East-West Film Festival in Honolulu.

== Plot ==
The hardships faced by a boy who works selling popsicles at the local train station and forced by economic circumstance to smuggle rice across the Thai-Malaysian border

== Cast ==
- Suriya Yaowasang as Hu Yan
- Wasana Pholyiam as Mimpi
- Suchao Pongwilai as Hu Yan's dad
- Duangjai Hathaikarn as teacher
