= Euthana Mukdasanit =

Thai film director and screenwriter (born 1952)

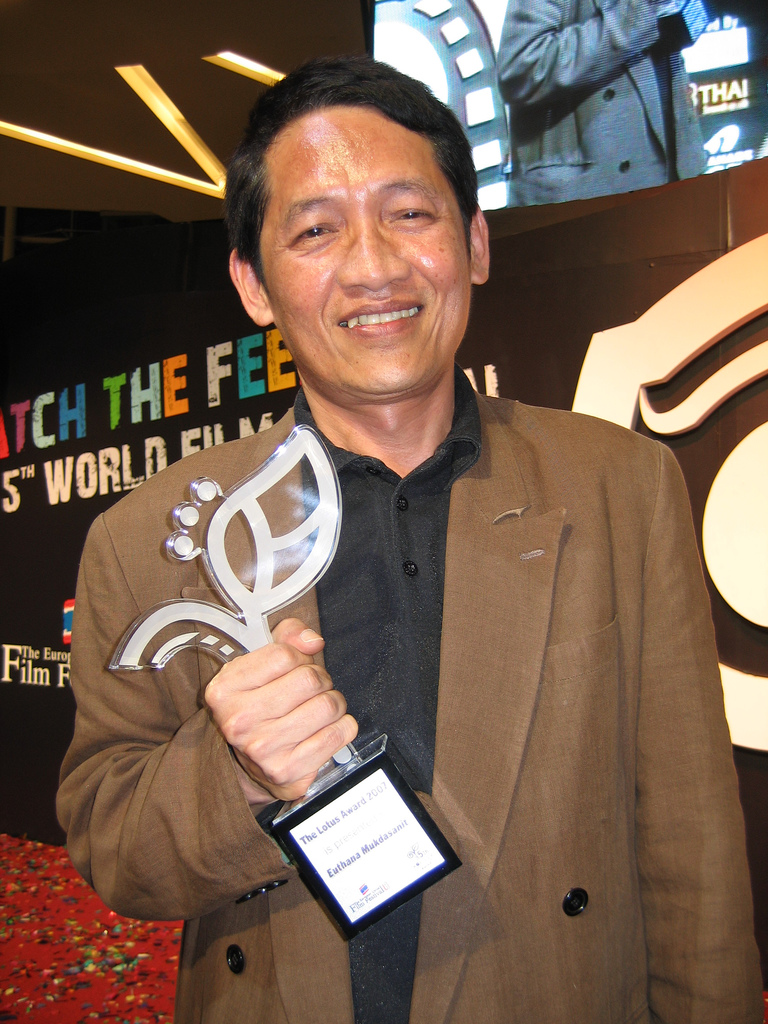
Euthana Mukdasanit with his Lotus Award for lifetime achievement at the 5th World Film Festival of Bangkok in October 2007.

Euthana Mukdasanit (Thai: ยุทธนา มุกดาสนิท, born May 25, 1952) is a Thai film director, screenwriter and National Artist of the Performing Arts (film director). As a contemporary director of Chatrichalerm Yukol, Euthana was among a group of directors that during the 1970s made films that focused on social problems. Among his early efforts was the 1977 docudrama, Tongpan, which was initially banned in Thailand for its socialist themes.

His 1984 film, Story of Nam Poo, was submitted as Thailand's official entry to the Academy Awards. Butterfly and Flowers, an acclaimed drama set in Muslim-majority southern Thailand, was screened and won Best Film at the Hawaii International Film Festival in 1985. He also directed the remake of the 1965 musical comedy film, Ngern Ngern Ngern (Money Money Money), and the romantic drama Sunset at Chaophraya (1996).

Euthana served as stunt coordinator and third-unit director on Chatrichalerm's The Legend of Suriyothai, and he also works as an acting coach.

He was awarded the Lotus Award for lifetime achievement by the World Film Festival of Bangkok in 2007.
