= Son of the Northeast =

- Thai VCD cover
- Directed by: Vichit Kounavudhi
- Written by: Vichit Kounavudhi; Kampoon Boonthavee (novel)
- Produced by: Kampoon Boonthavee; Thongpond Kounavudhi
- Cinematography: Porniti Virayasiri
- Edited by: Vichit Kounavudhi
- Music by: Surin Paksiri
- Production company: Five Star Production
- Release date: 3 July 1982
- Running time: 137 minutes
- Country: Thailand
- Languages: Thai; Laotian

Son of the Northeast (Thai: ลูกอีสาน, or Look Isan, also Child of the Northeast) is a 1982 historical drama film set in 1930s Isan, or northeastern Thailand. Directed by Vichit Kounavudhi, the film is based on a S.E.A. Write Award-winning book by Kampoon Boonthavee. Filmed in a documentary style, the story follows a tight-knit group of Isan subsistence farmers as they struggle against drought and other depredations.
