= Iconsiam =

Mixed-use development in Bangkok, Thailand

- ไอคอนสยาม

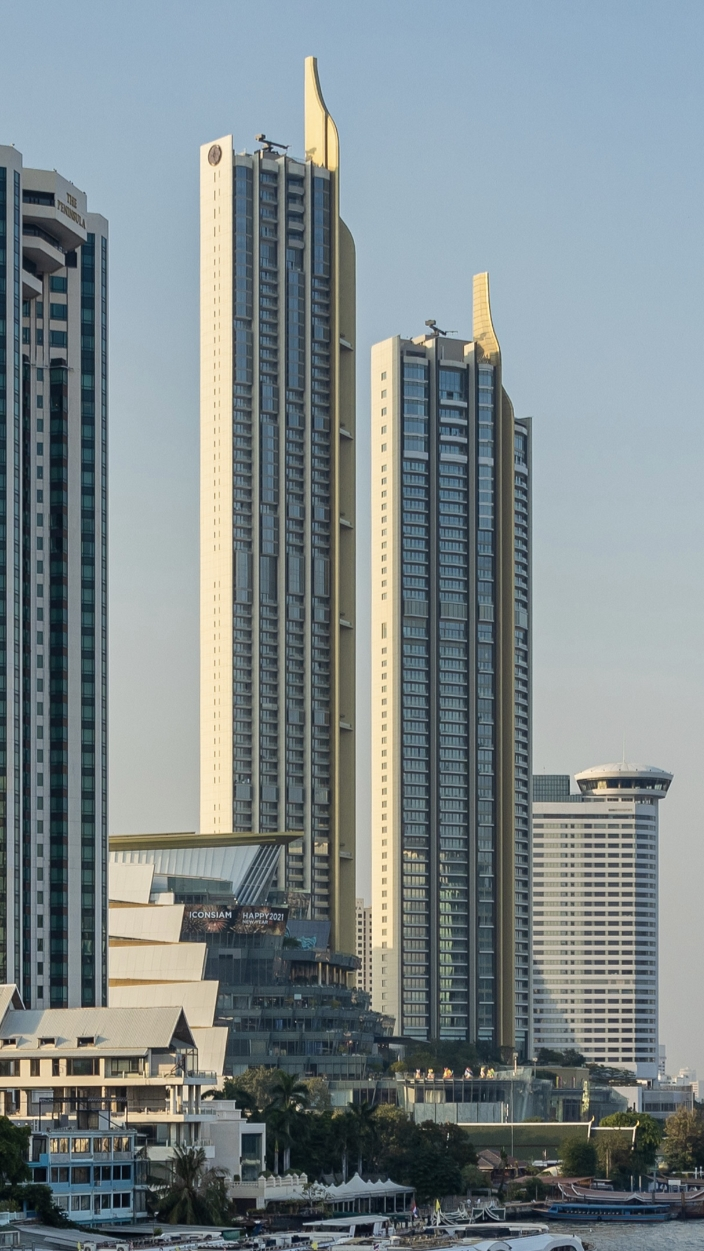
- Iconsiam seen from Chao Phraya River
- Location: 299 Charoen Nakhon Soi 5, Charoen Nakhon Road, Khlong San, Bangkok, Thailand
- Coordinates: 13.726690°N 100.510498°E
- Opened: 9 November 2018; 7 years ago (Iconsiam); 11 January 2023; 3 years ago (ICS)
- Owner: Siam Piwat; MQDC Magnolia Quality Development; Charoen Pokphand
- Architect: Urban Architect; Foster + Partners; Benoy
- Floor area: 525,000 m^{2} (5,650,000 sq ft) retail floor space
- Floors: 70 (including underground)
- Parking: 5,000 cars
- Public transit: Gold Line people mover: Charoen Nakhon station; Chao Phraya ferry
- Website: www.iconsiam.com

Iconsiam (stylized as ICONSIAM) is a mixed-use development on the banks of the Chao Phraya River in Bangkok, Thailand. It includes a large shopping mall, which opened to the public on 9 November 2018, as well as hotels and residences. The ฿54 billion Baht (US$1.5 billion) project was jointly developed by Siam Piwat, a Thai retail developer, MQDC Magnolia Quality Development, and Charoen Pokphand Group. The complex includes the tallest building in Thailand: the 70-floor Magnolia Waterfront Residences, and the country’s sixth tallest building: the 52-floor Mandarin Oriental Residences. It is served by Charoen Nakhon BTS station on the Gold Line.

== Features ==
ICONSIAM Building

- 525,000 m^{2} (5,650,000 sq ft) total retail area.
- Siam Takashimaya department store and an Apple Retail Store.
- 3,000-seat auditorium/exhibition hall
- Iconsiam Heritage Museum (River Museum Bangkok), a joint project with The Fine Arts Department of the Ministry of Culture of Thailand.
- Two residential buildings, the Magnolia Waterfront Residences (318m and 70 floors, 300 units) and The Residences at Mandarin Oriental, Bangkok, (272m, 52 floors, 146 units).
- A riverside park with an area of more than 10,000 m^{2} (110,000 sq ft) along the Chao Phraya River and a riverside walkway.

ICS Building

- Addition to the current mall
- 244-room Millennium Hilton Bangkok by Hilton Hotels & Resorts.

== Transport ==
Iconsiam is located adjacent to the Charoen Nakhon station of the Gold Line. It opened on 16 December 2020. Iconsiam is working with the Urban Design and Development Centre (UDDC) at Chulalongkorn University, the Marine Department of the Transport Ministry, and the Bangkok Metropolitan Administration to upgrade four river piers—Sathorn, Ratchawong, Tha Dindaeng, and Ratcha Nevy—by June 2019. Four piers are built on site for private boats and public ferries. Visitors can ride the ferry provided by Iconsiam from various piers; Sathorn Pier, Sheraton Hotel Bangkok, Si Phraya Pier.

== Awards ==
The project won several design accolades since its opening, including:

- Best Design of the Year at the World Retail Awards 2019 hosted by the World Retail Congress;
- First prize in the Best Shopping Center category at the MAPIC Awards 2019 in Cannes;
- 2020 VIVA Best-of-the-Best Design and Development Award;
- One of the top four finalist in the MPIM International Real Estate Awards 2021 in the Best Shopping Centre category.

== Gallery ==
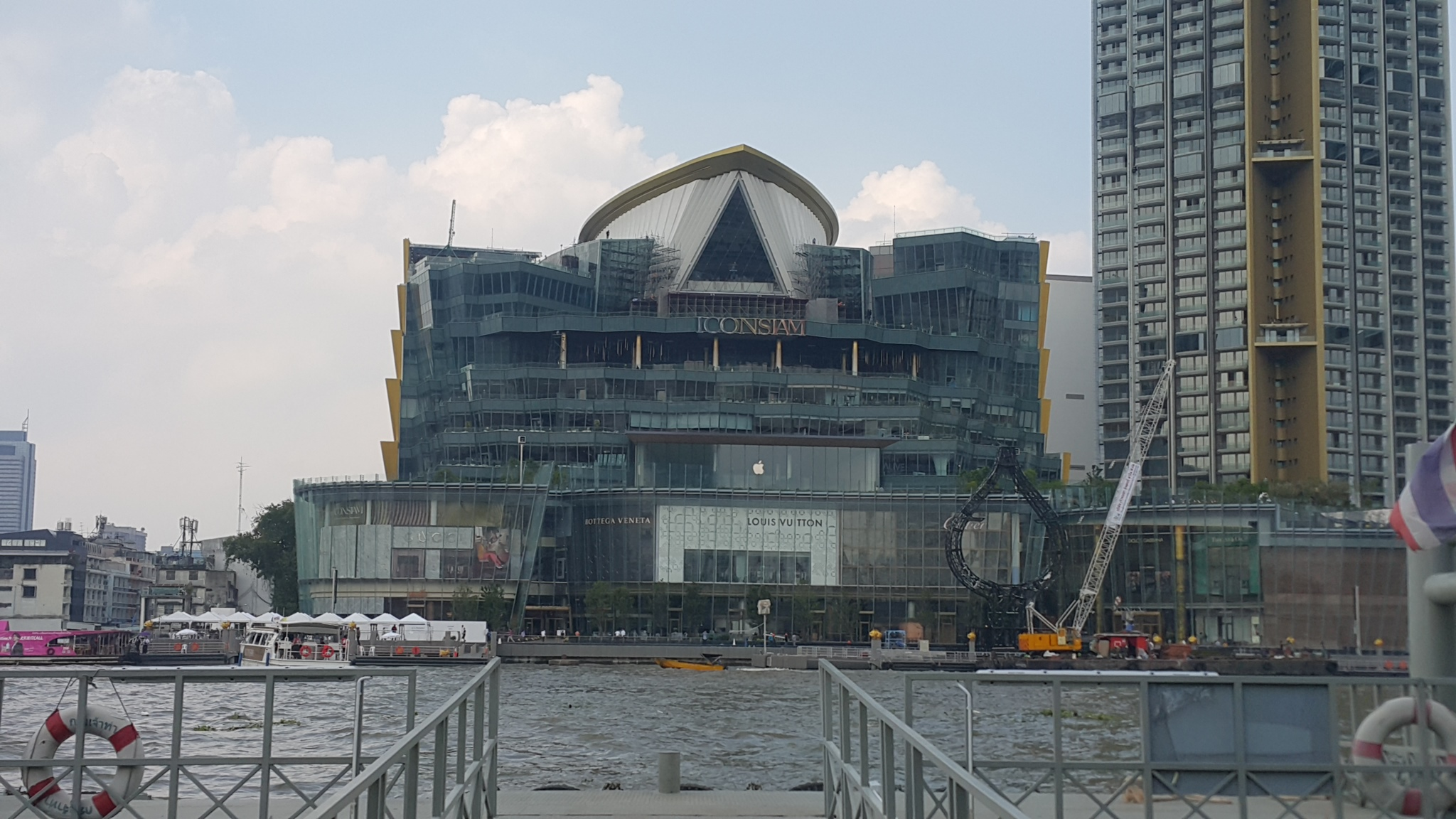
Iconsiam seen from across Chao Phraya river

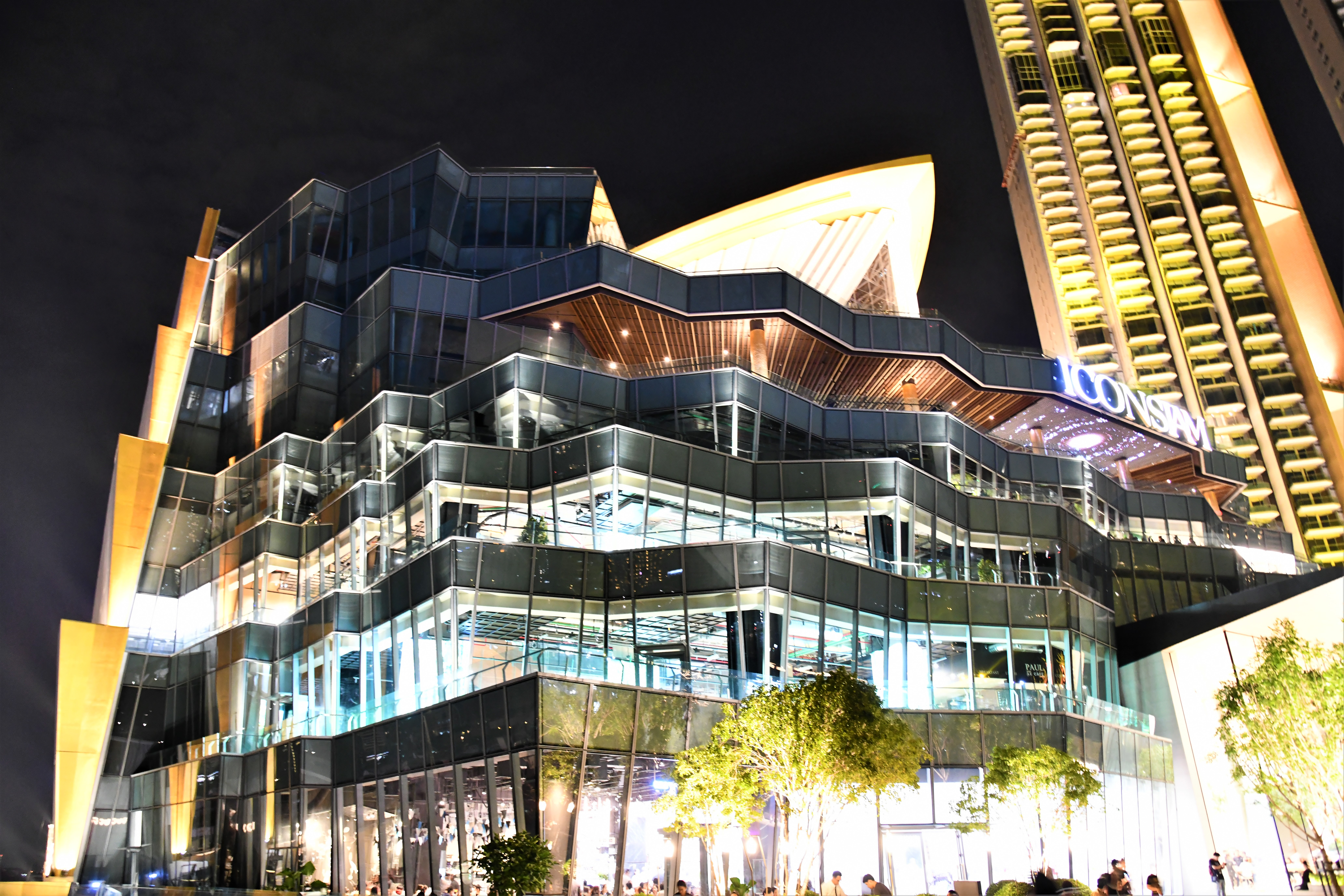
Condominium & department store

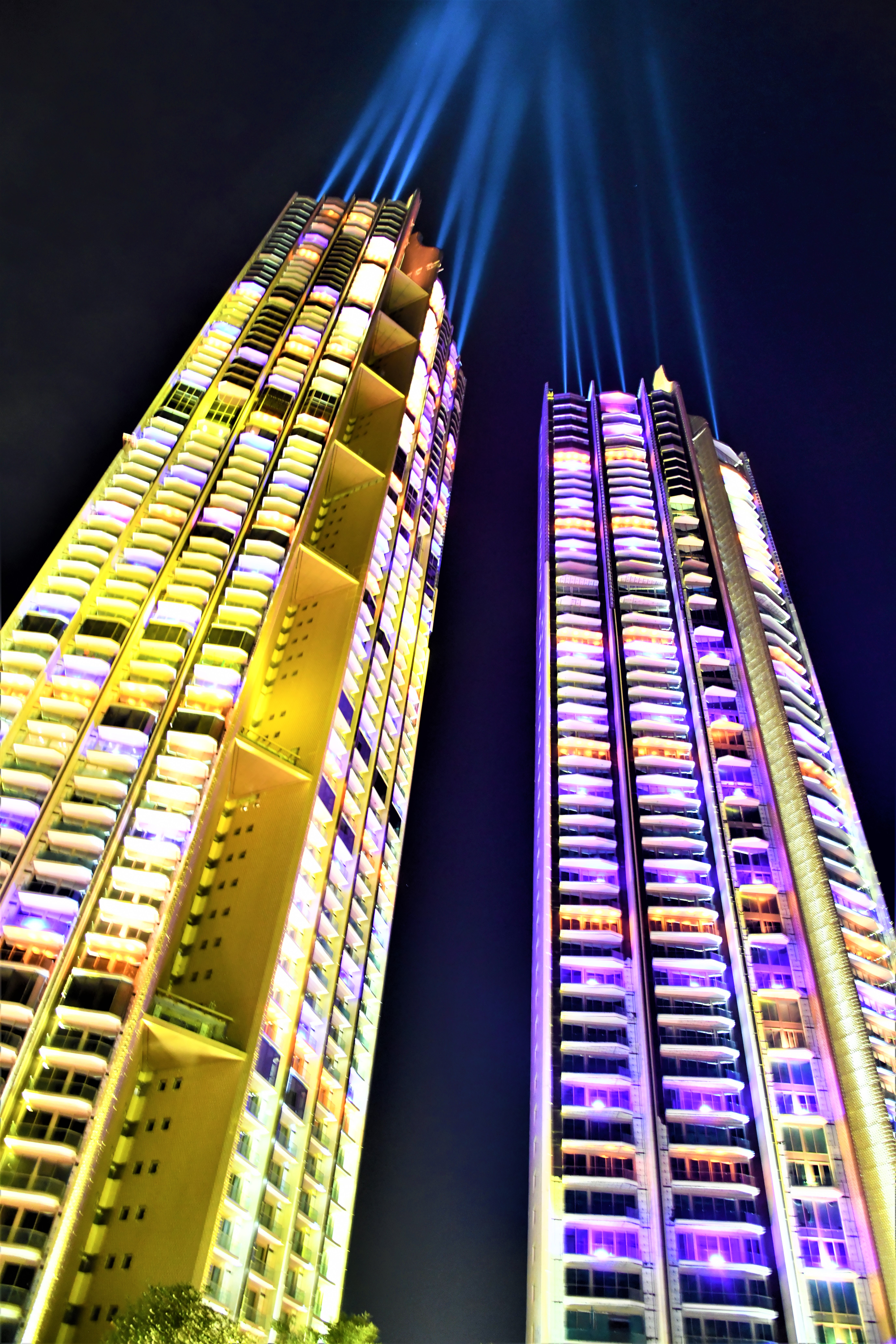
Magnolia Waterfront Residences

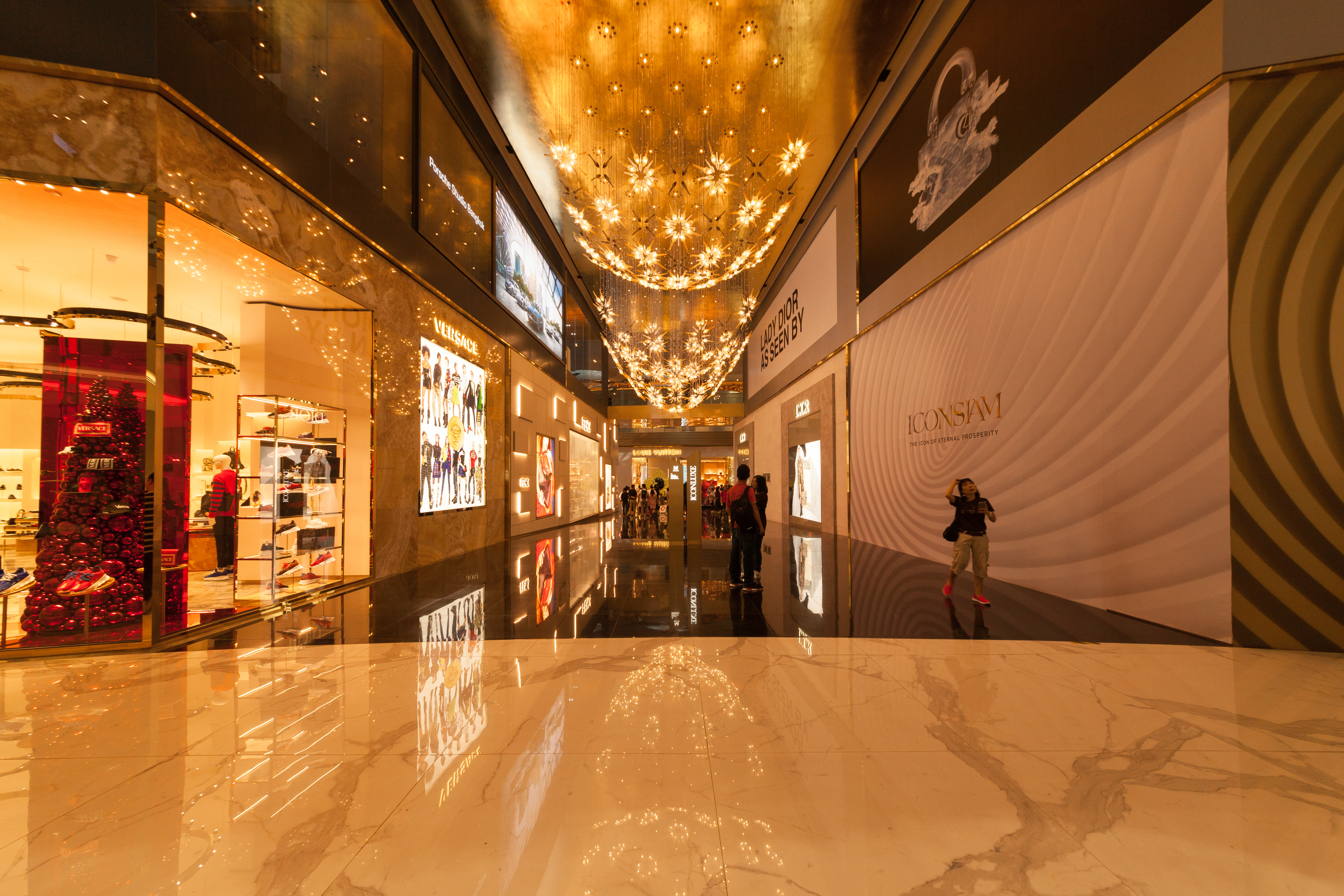
IconLuxe

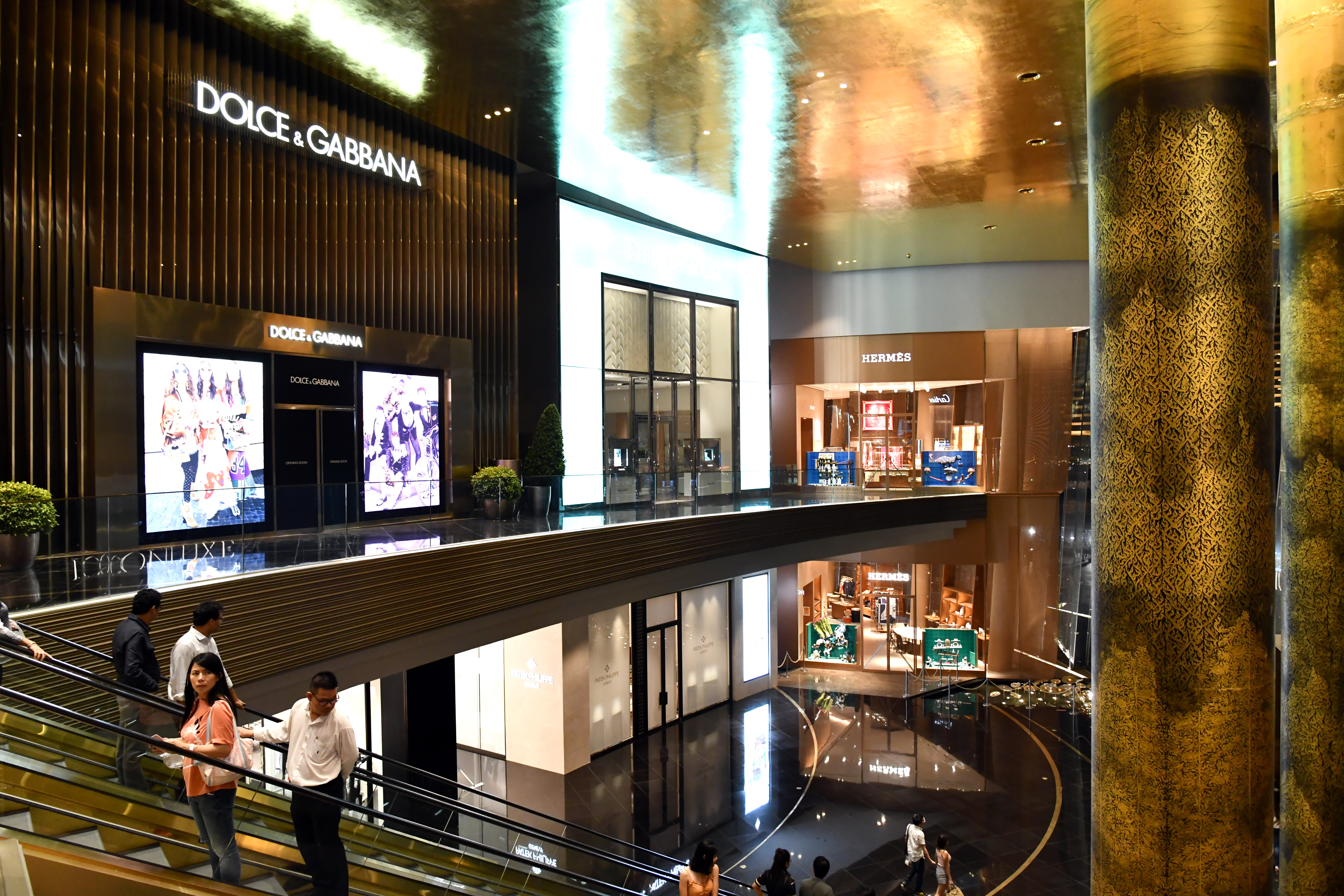
Inside IconLuxe

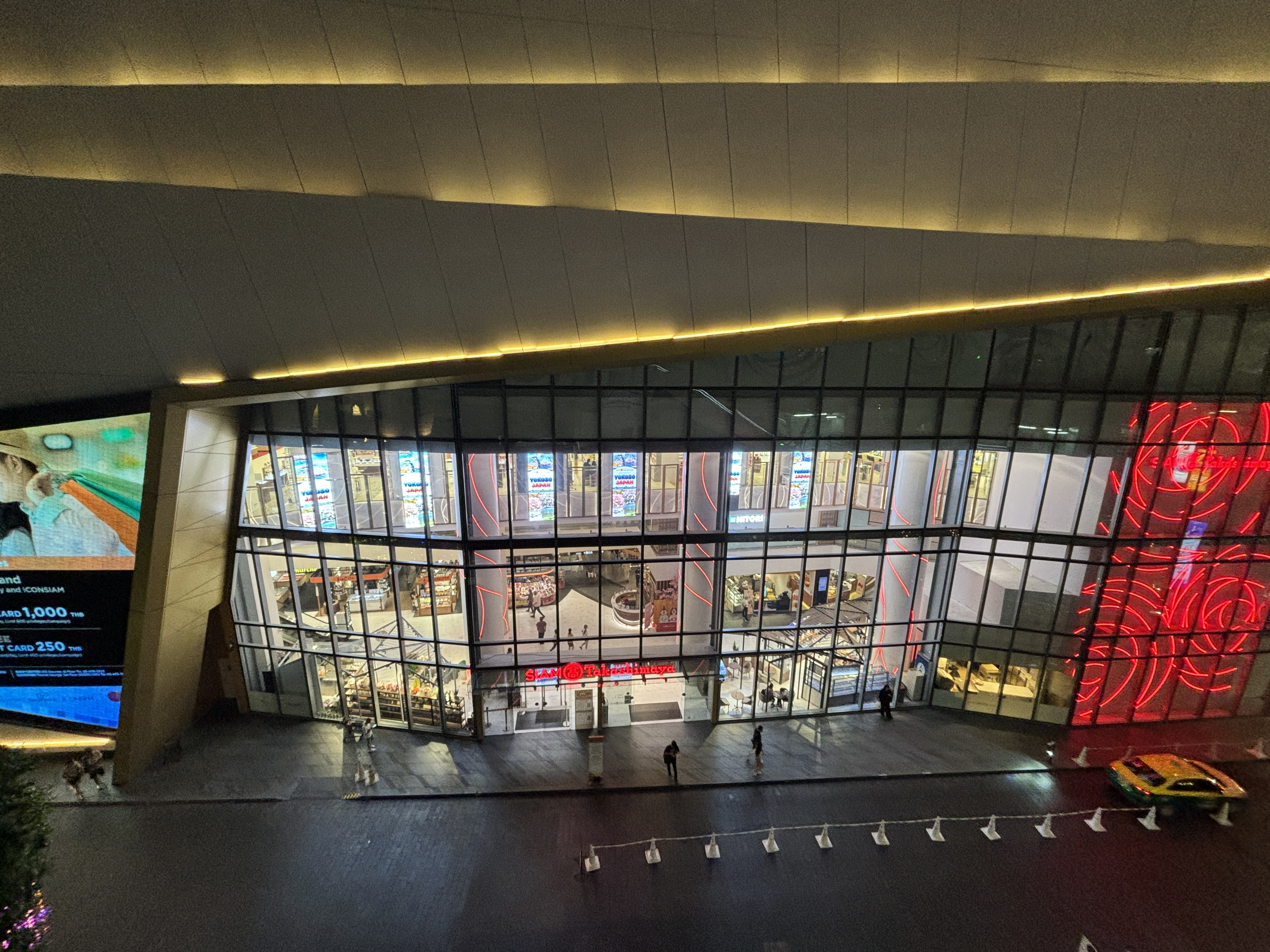
Siam Takashimaya

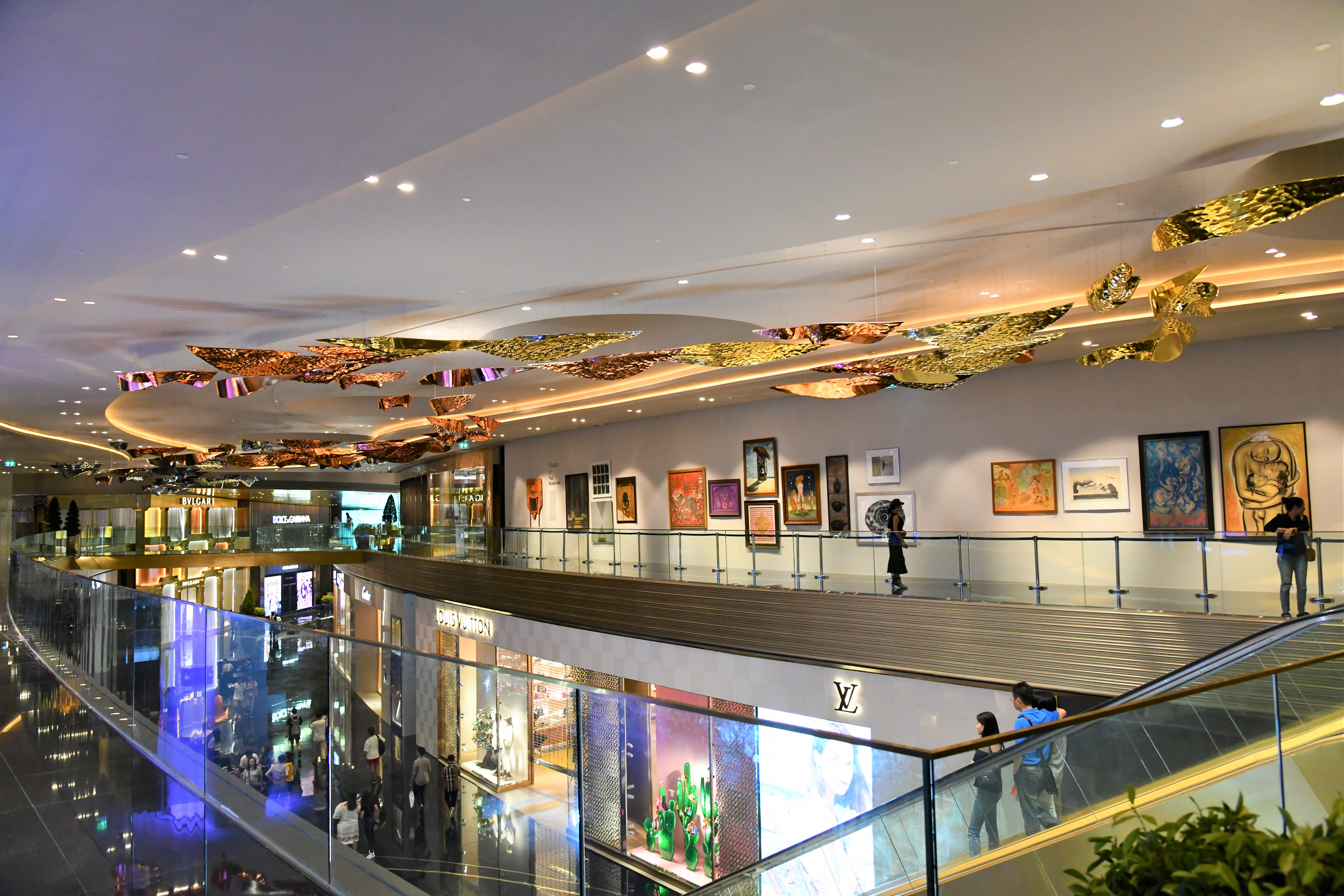
Grand Openning Iconsiam of Thailand

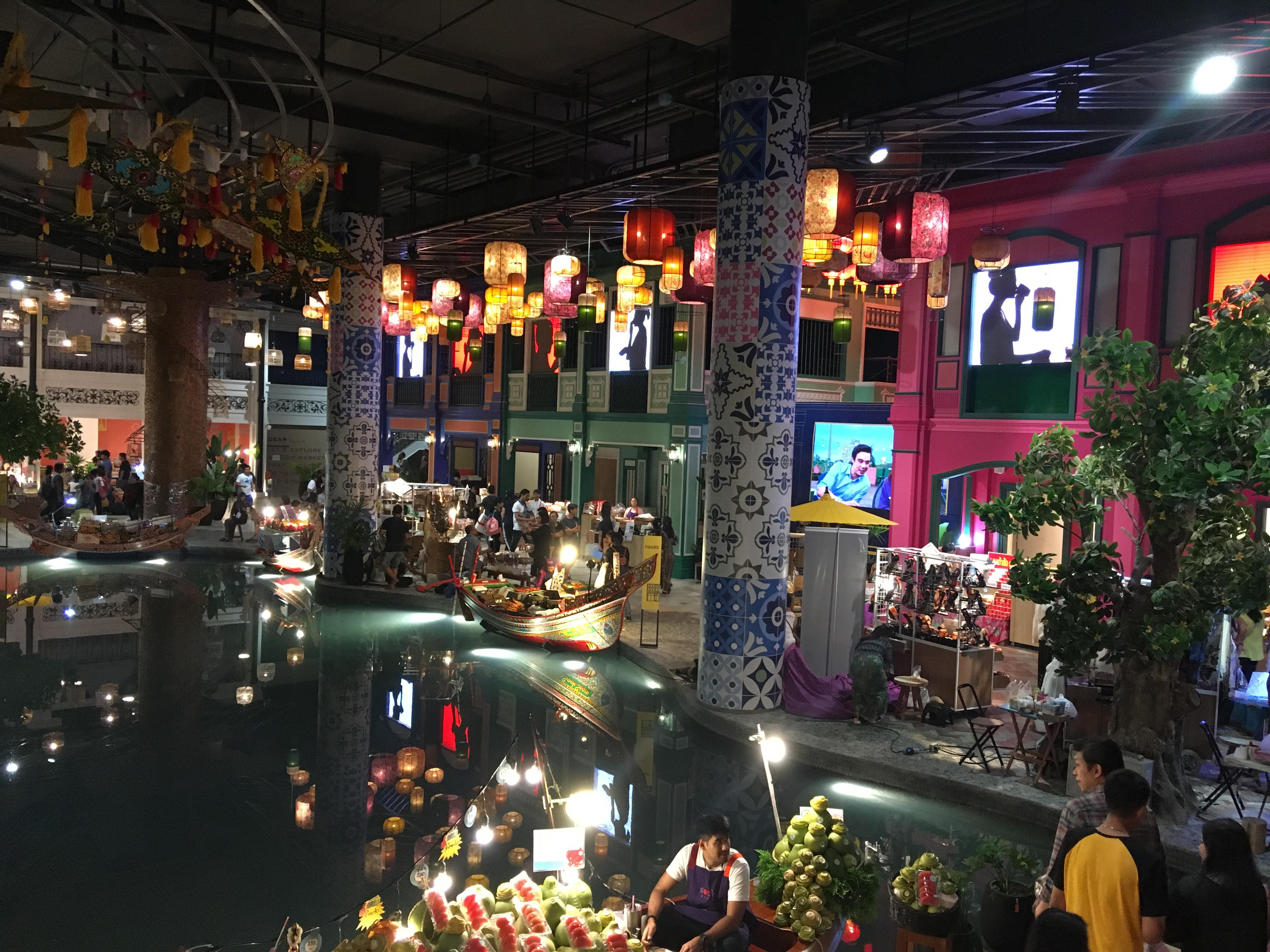
SookSiam

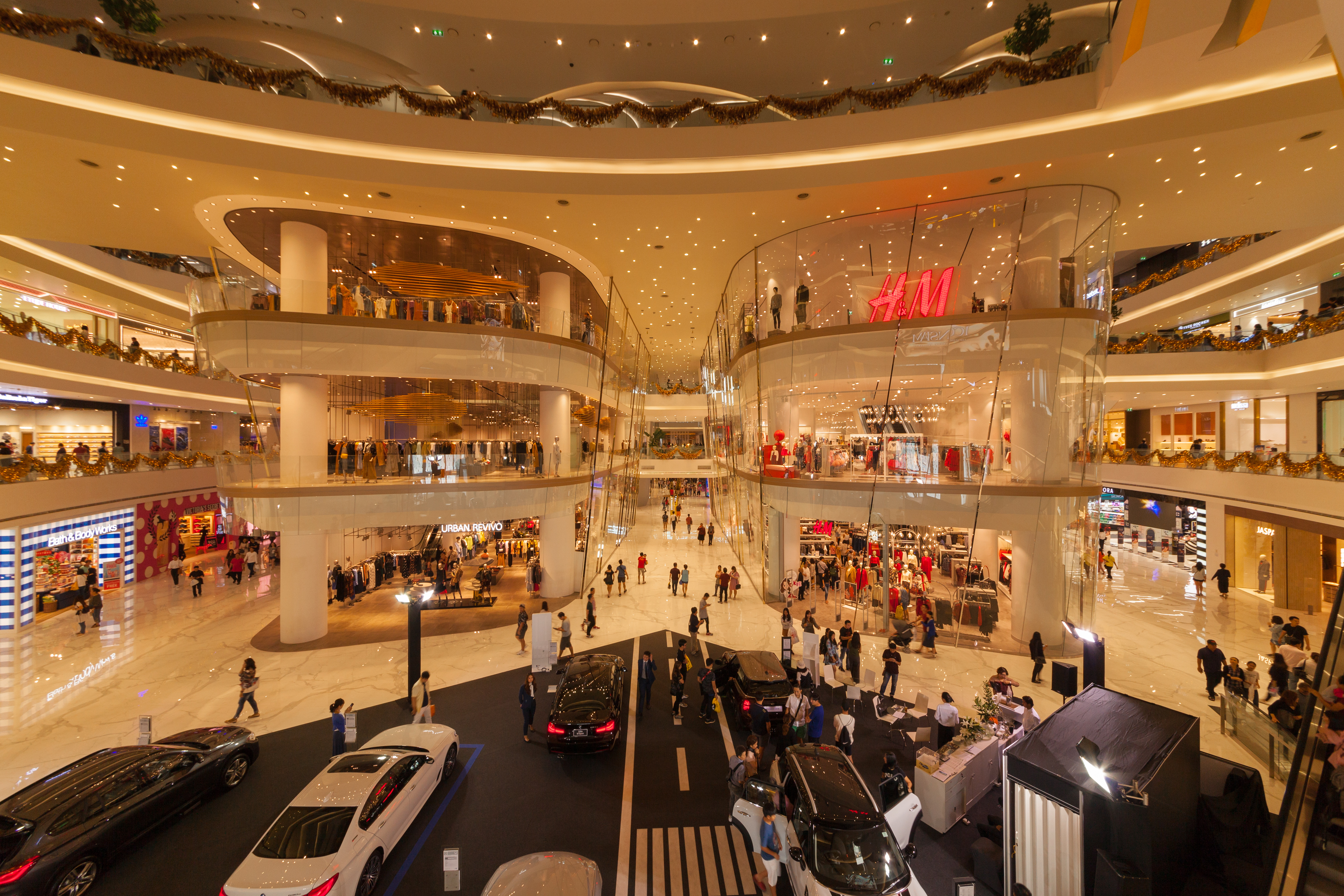
Atrium inside the mall

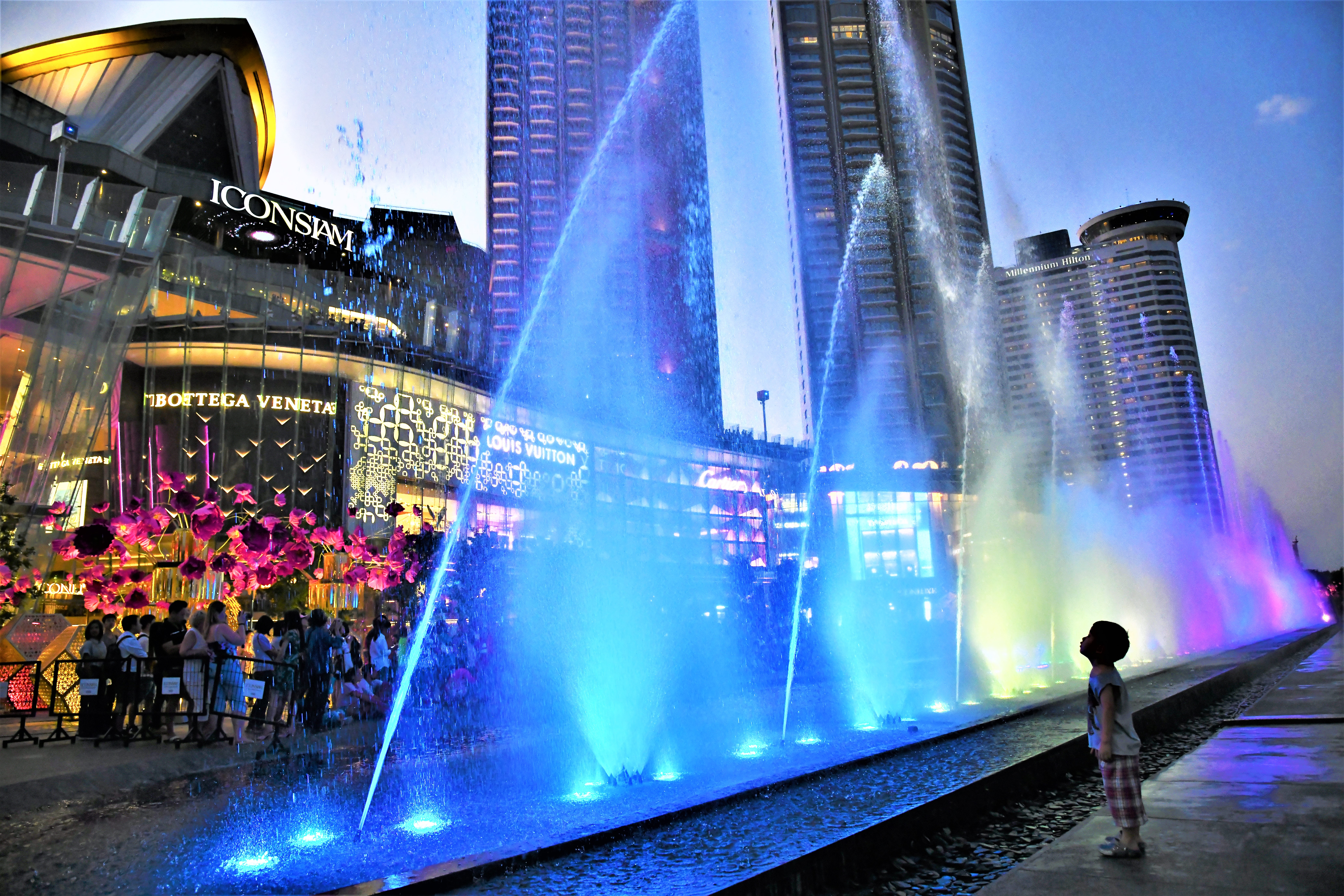
Water features

== See also ==
- List of tallest buildings in Bangkok
- List of tallest buildings in Thailand

Records
Preceded by King Power Mahanakhon	Tallest building in Thailand; 317.95 m (1,043 ft); 2018–present	Incumbent
