= Vichit Kounavudhi =

Thai film director and screenwriter

- วิจิตร คุณาวุฒิ
- Vichit Kounavudhi from the official program of the 2005 Bangkok International Film Festival
- Born: 23 January 1922; Bang Khla, Chachoengsao, Siam
- Died: 31 July 1997 (aged 75); Bangkok, Thailand
- Other name: Kounavudhi (pen name)
- Occupations: Film director; screenwriter
- Years active: 1950s–1980s

Vichit Kounavudhi (Thai: วิจิตร คุณาวุฒิ; 23 January 1922, in Chachoengsao, Thailand – 31 July 1997) was a Thai film director and screenwriter. His works include the docudrama Son of the Northeast.

== Biography ==
=== Early career ===
Vichit graduated from Vajiravudh College in 1946 and started working as a journalist under the pen name Kounavudhi. He got into filmmaking in 1950, when he was offered the villain's role in Fa Kamnod.

He then started working as a screenwriter, writing the dialogue for an adaptation of Wannaboon Withayakom's Phrom Bandan. His first screenplay was Santi-Weena, an acclaimed drama directed by Tawee "Kru Marut" Na Bangchang. It went on to competition in the 1955 Asia Film Festival in Tokyo, where it won several awards, including best cinematography for cinematographer Rattana Pestonji.

Vichit started directing in 1958 and made 23 films until he retired in 1989. He had a string of action films in the 1960s and early '70s. Several starred legendary leading man Mitr Chaibancha. He also made several films with actor Adul Dulyarat.

=== Later films ===
In the 1970s, Vichit was among the filmmakers who highlighted social problems in their films. His 1978 drama, Mia Luang, or First Wife, examined the issue of men taking mistresses or a mia noi (second wife).

His next film, 1979's Khon Phukao, or Mountain People, was an adventure tale about a young hill-tribe couple. It included a documentary-style introduction of the various ethnic groups in northern Thailand.

Look Isan, or Son of the Northeast was shot in a similar documentary style to Mountain People. Set in Thailand's rural northeast in the 1930s, Look Isan is a sympathetic depiction of a hard-scrabble life, with vivid wildlife photography and some rousing action sequences. It is regarded as Vichet's best film.

His 1985 film, Her Name is Boonrawd, was a look back at the Vietnam War days and the prostitution scene around Utapao air base, where US Air Force troops were based. In it, a spirited young woman struggles to earn an honest living and find true love with one of the American officers.

In 1983, Vichit was awarded an honorary doctorate in Communication Arts by Chulalongkorn University and was honored in 1987 by Thailand's National Culture Commission as a National Artist.

=== Legacy ===
In 2005, the Bangkok International Film Festival included four films by Vichit in a retrospective: First Wife, Mountain People, Son of the Northeast and Her Name is Boonrawd. The festival also gave its annual Lifetime Achievement Award to Vichit, presenting it to his widow.

The festival program noted that: "Vichit Kounavudhi is regarded today as a master of the Thai motion picture industry - one of the greatest inspirations to later generations of filmmakers, praised as a genius of directing, screenwriting and editing. What makes his films special is not sophisticated technique, but an exceptional clarity and concision."

== Partial filmography ==
- Jam Loey Rak (1963)
- Operation Bangkok (1966)
- Top Secret (1967)
- First Wife (Mia Luang) (1978)
- Mountain People (Khon Phukao) (1979)
- Son of the Northeast (Look Isan) (1982)
- Her Name is Boonrawd (1985)
