= Siam Piwat =

Thai real estate company

Siam Piwat Co. Ltd

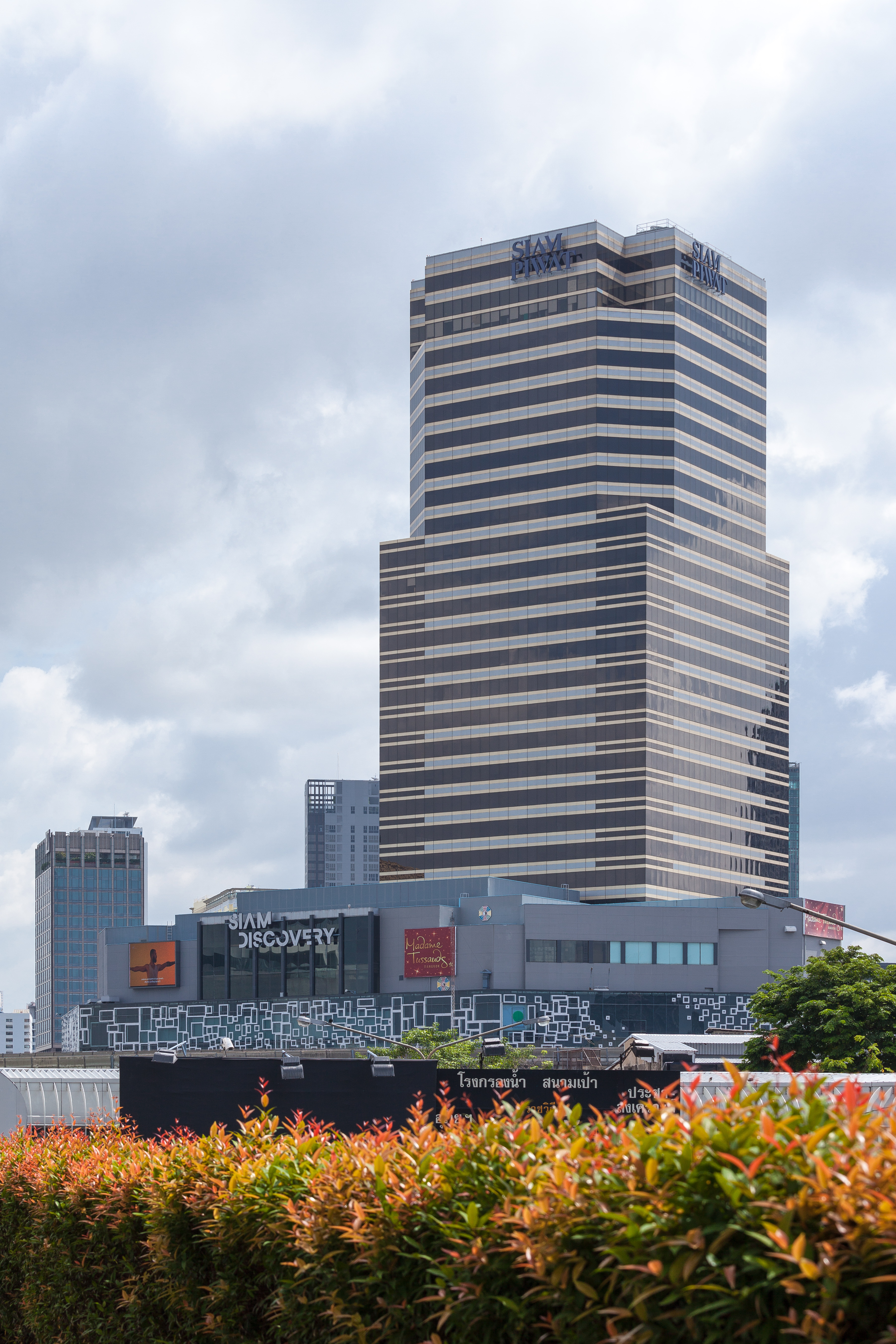
- Siam Piwat Building
- Company type: Privately held
- Industry: Real estate
- Founded: 1958
- Founder: Chalermchai Charuwat
- Headquarters: Bangkok, Thailand
- Products: Shopping Malls, Office buildings
- Website: www.siampiwat.com

Siam Piwat is a Bangkok-based retail and development company. The company is best known for managing Siam Center, Siam Discovery, Siam Paragon, and Iconsiam shopping malls in Bangkok, Thailand.

== History ==
Siam Piwat Company Limited was first established as Bangkok InterContinental Hotel Company Limited on 10 January 1959, to manage and develop 50 rai of land on Rama I Road to build the first international five-star hotel in Thailand, the Siam Intercontinental Hotel with General Chalermchai Charuwat as the founder. Initially, Sarit Thanarat, the prime minister at the time, saw the tourism benefits from the creation of hotels by foreign capital groups. Therefore, approved funding from the Government Lottery Office including grants from large financial institutions in the country to invest in that company. After the said hotel has been operating for 30 years, the company intends to build a new shopping center in that area. Therefore, it ceased the hotel operations on 30 June 2002. After that, proceed to demolish all the original buildings and changed the company name to "Siam Piwat Company Limited" which is the name that has been bestowed by Princess Maha Chakri Sirindhorn on 28 January 2003. The current area is the location of the Siam Paragon shopping center.
