= Anchalee Chaiworaporn =

Thai film critic and journalist

Anchalee Chaiworaporn (อัญชลี ชัยวรพร) is a Thai film critic and scholar. In 2000, she was named Thailand's best film critic.

Chaiworaporn completed a degree in English at Thammasat University and a master's degree in journalism from Chulalongkorn University. She started working as a journalist reporting on social development news and was a writer for two English-language newspapers, Thailand Times and The Nation. In 1994 she began writing on the film industry and she later completed a second master's degree in film studies from the University of Southampton. In 2000, she was named Thailand's best film critic and in 2002 she was named the country's best feature writer.

Chaiworaporn has been working as an independent scholar in Asian cinema since 2002. She used to conduct research on women filmmakers in South Korea (supported by Ford Foundation), Japan (Japan Foundation), Indonesia, Malaysia, and Philippines (Nippon Foundation). Other research projects include the films of 311 Tragedy in Japan (through Sumitomo Foundation) and Thai arthouse directors in New York. She has also done extensive researches in Thai cinema through Thai Research Fund. Her works have been published widely in English, Spanish, Italian, French, Japanese, and Korea, to name a few. She finished her dictirak degree from the University of Southampton funded by the University of Southampton Vice-Chancellors Award.
