= Close to Home (film) =

- Theatrical release poster
- Hebrew: קרוב לבית
- Directed by: Dalia Hager; Vidi Bilu
- Starring: Smadar Sayar; Naama Schendar; Irit Suki; Katia Zimbris
- Release date: July 2005 (JFF)
- Running time: 90 minutes
- Country: Israel
- Language: Hebrew

Close to Home (Hebrew: קרוב לבית, romanized: Karov la bayit) is a 2005 Israeli drama film directed by Dalia Hager and Vidi Bilu, and starring Smadar Sayar and Naama Schedar. It is the first film about the experience of female soldiers in the Israel Defense Forces.

Smadar (Sayar) and Mirit (Schendar), both 18 years old, are assigned to patrol the streets of Jerusalem together as part of their military service. Worlds apart in their personality, their initial frosty relationship becomes a friendship as they deal with their own emotional issues, the crushes and break-ups in their love lives, as well as the political realities of the city in which they live.

The film premiered at the 2005 Jerusalem Film Festival. It also showed at the 56th Berlin International Film Festival where it was awarded a prize by the International Association of Art Film Houses.

== Plot ==
Mirit (Naama Shender) is a melancholic and serious young woman from a good family who enlists in the IDF, hoping to serve in a position of responsibility and influence. She is assigned to a Border Police unit of female soldiers with a diverse group of personnel and no proper training provided. The unit's main role is to check the identification cards of passersby in Jerusalem, with the notion that this might help prevent terrorist attacks.

In practice, it's difficult to determine if the unit has any real security value. The female soldiers harass passersby, many of them avoid taking their duties seriously, and service in the unit is unpleasant and unfulfilling. Mirit particularly struggles to adapt to her patrol partner, Smadar (Smadar Sayar), who is very different from her in many ways. Smadar pressures her to overcome her shyness and flirt with men passing on the street. One consequence of this is that Mirit is tempted to dance with hotel guests she's supposed to be guarding, gets caught by her commanders, and is sent to military prison. However, various crises that Mirit and Smadar experience together, such as a bomb that explodes near them (in the Nahalat Shiva neighborhood) and a near-lynch they barely manage to prevent of a man who refuses to show them his ID, build a strong friendship between them.

== See also ==
- Women's cinema
