= Vidi Bilu =

Israeli film director

Vidi Bilu (Hebrew: וידי בילו; born 6 January 1959) is an Israeli film director.

== Biography ==
Vidi Bilu studied between 1983 and 1985 at the photography department of Hadassah College. She began to study cinema in 1986, at the School of Beit Zvi, and specialised in direction in 1989. The director of many publicity films, and at the same time, editor and producer, she has directed many films, such as Close to Home in 2005.

== Filmography ==
- 2005 : Close to Home
- 2002 : Yes or no
- 1995 : Monologues
- 1993 : Thirty times four
