= Chalermchai Charuvastr =

Thai general (1916–2009)

Chalermchai Charuvastr (Thai: เฉลิมชัย จารุวัสตร์, 1916–2009) was a Thai army general, hotelier and business executive, known for pioneering the Thai tourism industry and heading the Siam Piwat company, owner of multiple major shopping malls in the Siam area.

Chalermchai was a close aide of Sarit Thanarat, Thailand's strongman dictator prime minister from 1959 to 1963, and he served several government positions under Sarit. Like Sarit, he was a strong supporter of the monarchy. In 1960, he was appointed the first director of the Tourist Organisation of Thailand (now the Tourism Authority of Thailand), and became chairman of The Syndicate of Thai Hotels and Tourists Enterprises, the state-owned company that ran the Erawan Hotel. He also headed the Bangkok Intercontinental Hotels Company, which was established to run the Siam InterContinental Hotel and later became Siam Piwat.
