= Dnu Huntrakul =

Thai musician

Dnu Huntrakul (Thai: ดนู ฮันตระกูล), born March 26, 1950, is a prominent Thai composer and chamber musician who has been active in the musical life of Thailand since the 1960s. Among his works is The Light of Asia, performed at the 1998 Asian Games in Bangkok, and the Chao Phraya Suite for Orchestra.

Huntrakul is of Chinese descent. The Huntrakul family has ancestral origins from Wenchang in Hainan.
