= Siam Center =

- Siam Center in 2026
- Location: Rama I Road, Pathum Wan, Bangkok, Thailand
- Coordinates: 13°44′47″N 100°31′57″E
- Opened: 29 January 1973 (Siam Center)
- Developer: Siam Piwat
- Manager: Siam Piwat
- Owner: Siam Piwat
- Num. of stores: 400 (Siam Center and Discovery combined)
- Floors: 4 (Siam Center), 11 (Siam Carpark), 36 (Siam Discovery and Tower)
- Parking: 1,500
- Public transit: Siam station
- Website: www.siamcenter.co.th

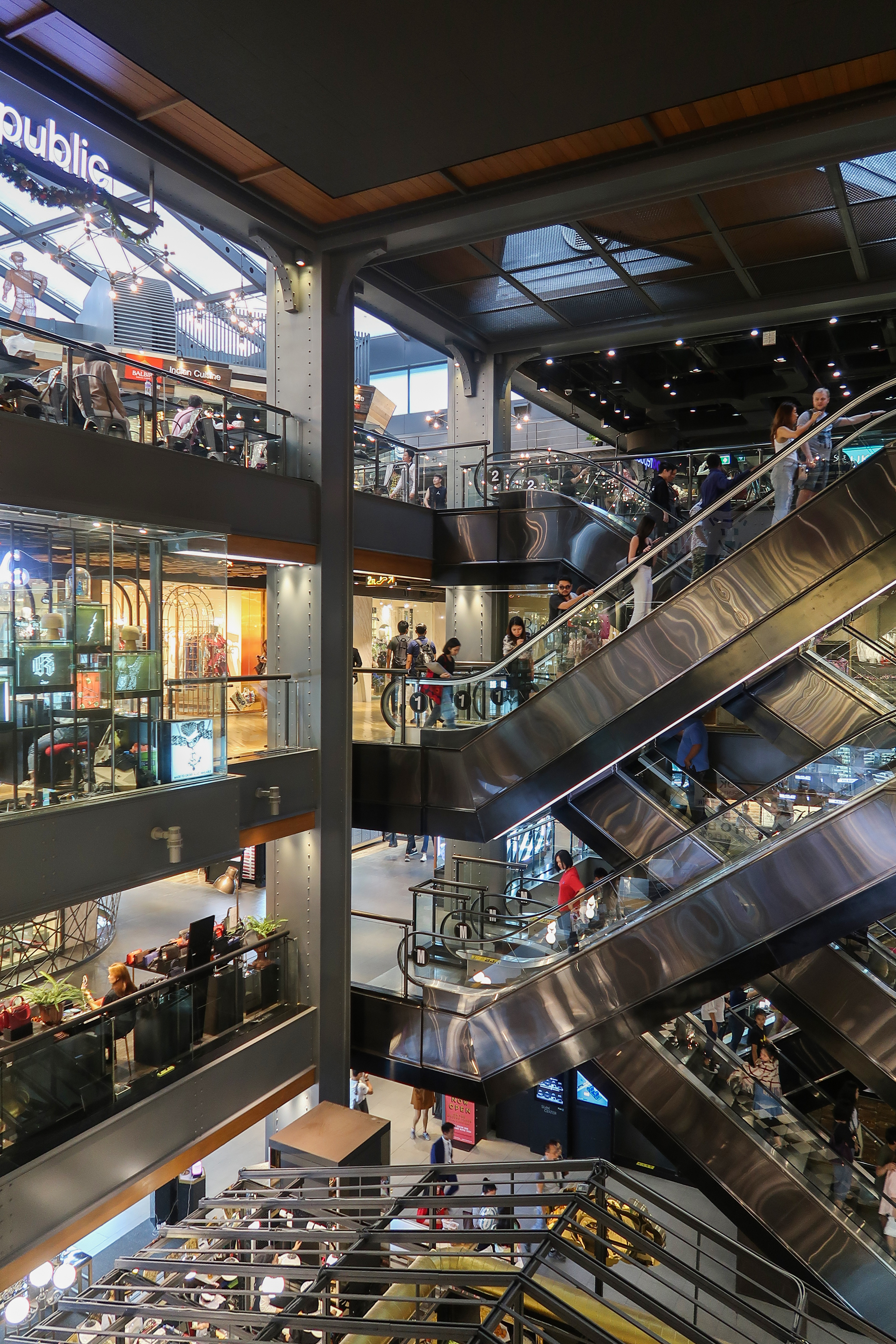
Siam Center Atrium after renovation in 2013

Siam Center (Thai: สยามเซ็นเตอร์) is a shopping center near Siam BTS station in Bangkok, Thailand.

== History ==
Siam Center was built in 29 January 1973 as one of Bangkok's first shopping malls. It has undergone renovation several times, including after a fire in 1997. On 11 January 2013, Siam Center re-branded itself as Siam Center The Ideaopolis.

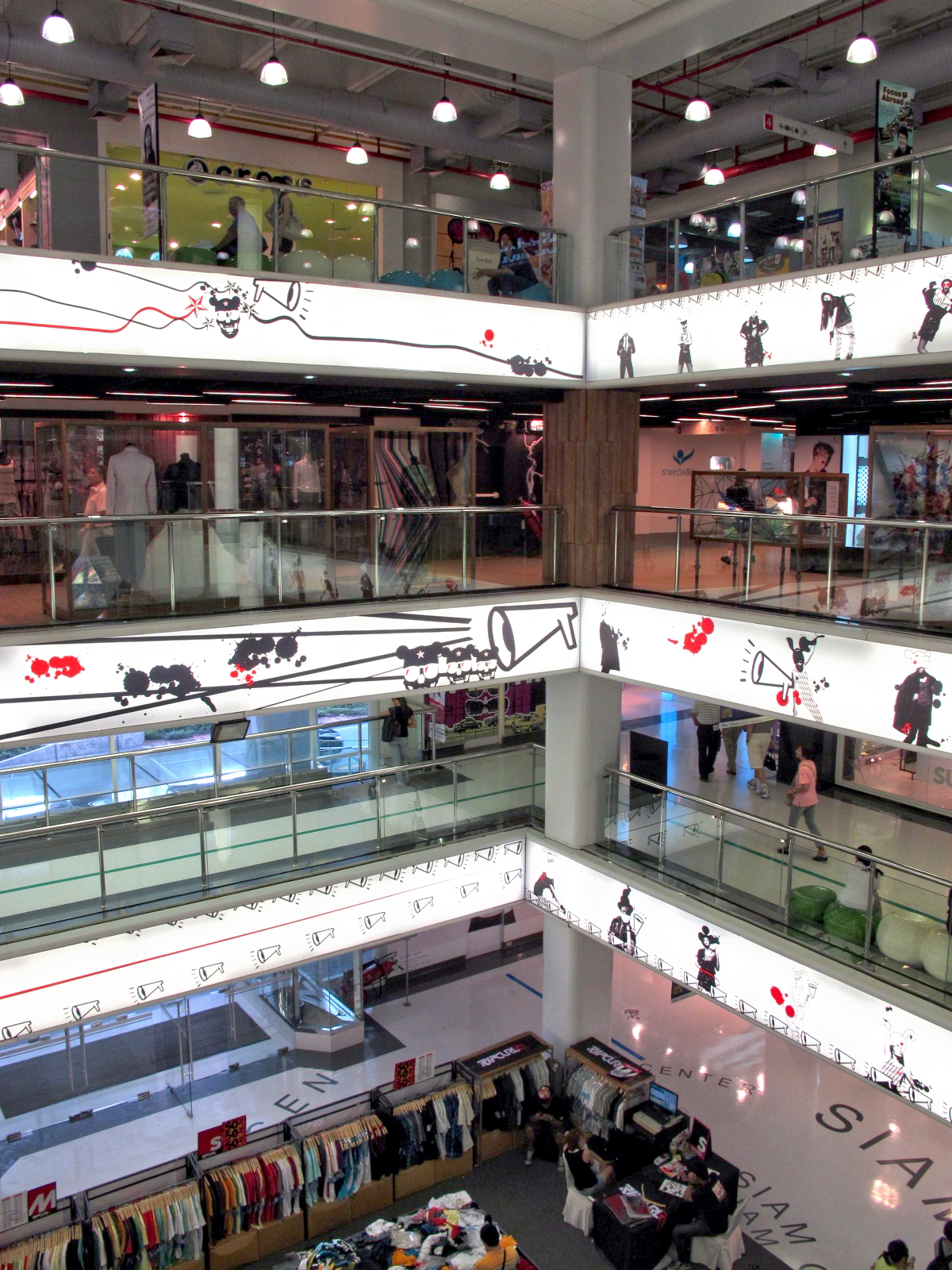
Atrium in 2011

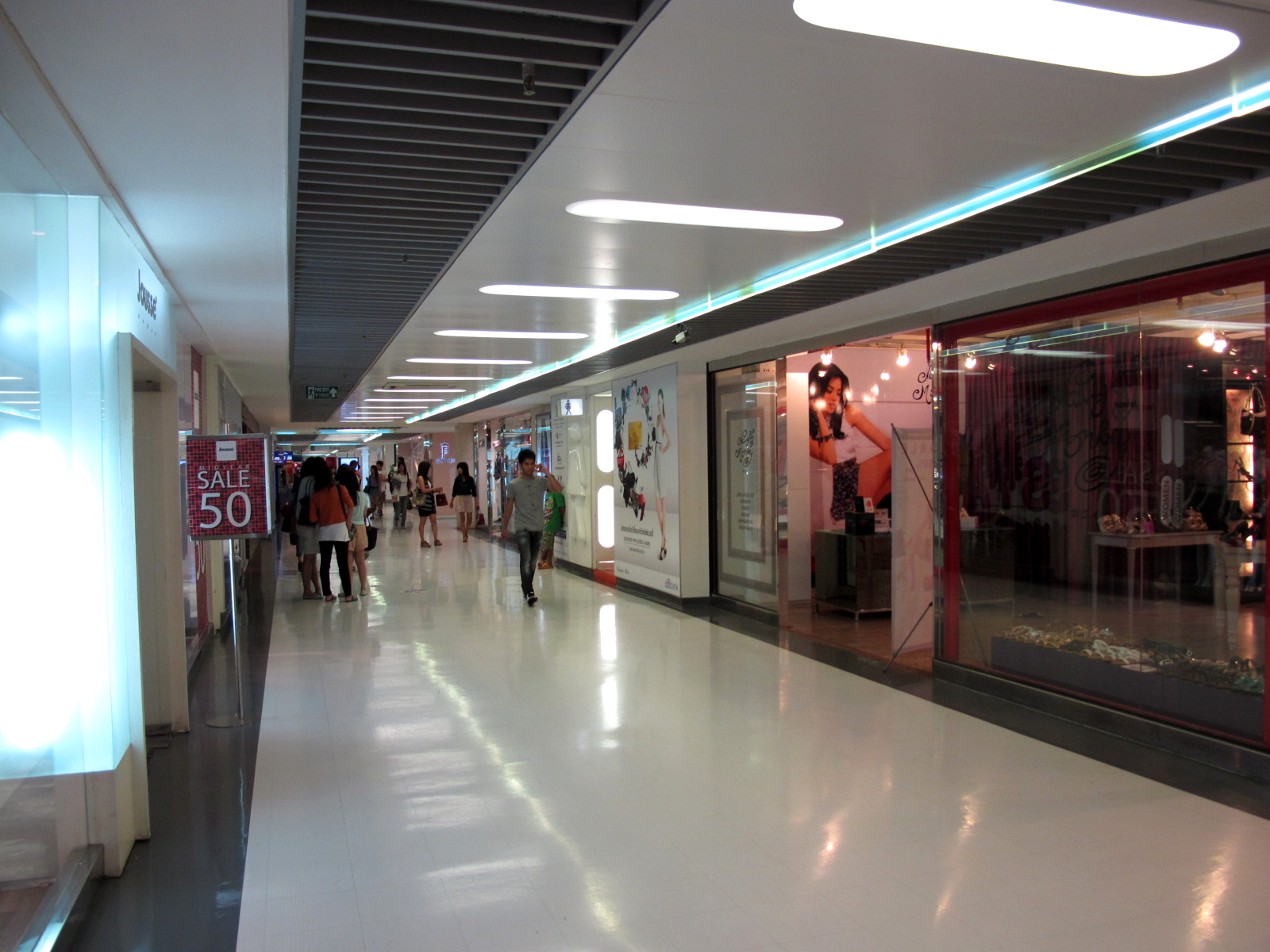
Level 2 shops in 2011

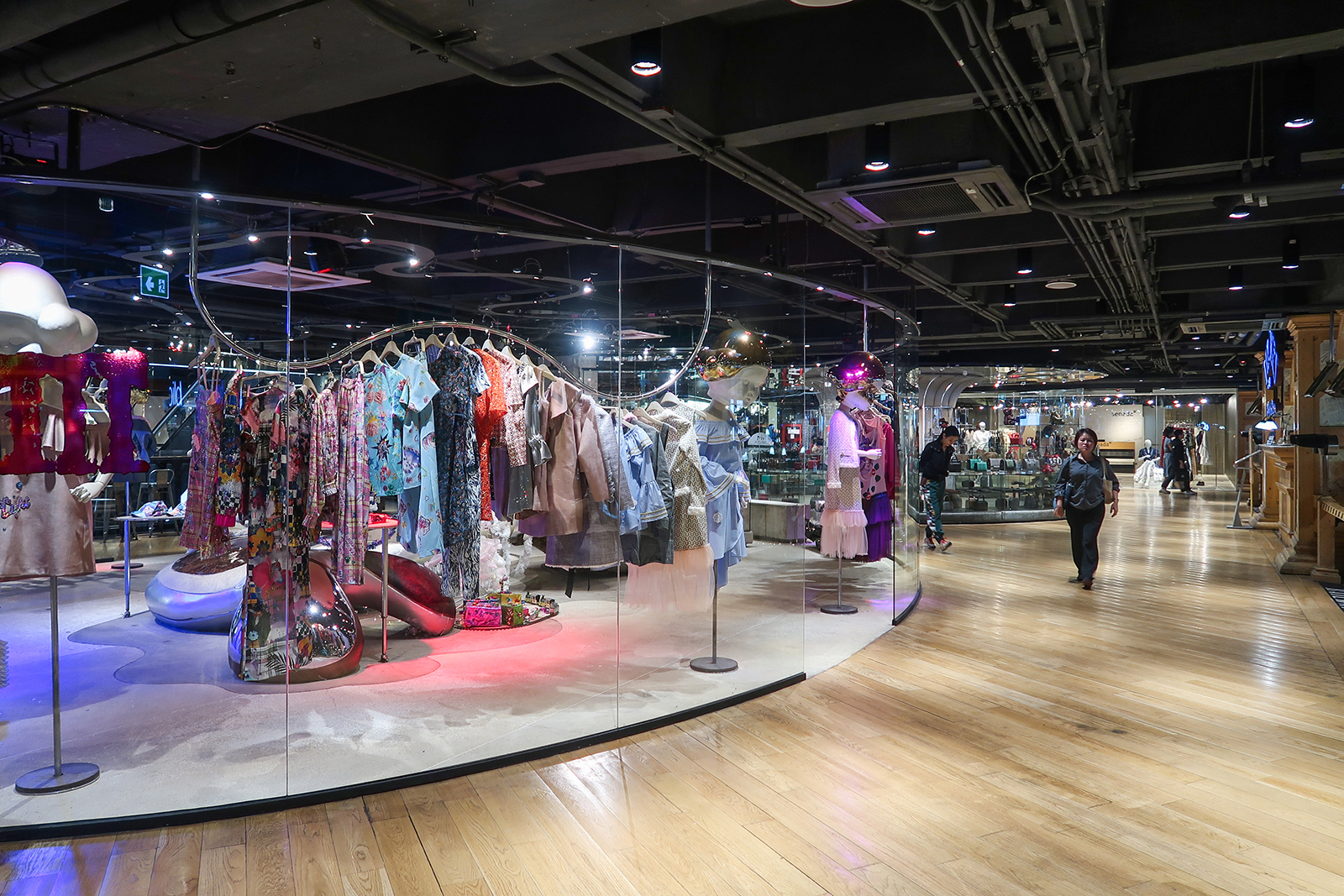
After renovation, the shops use open-shopfront design

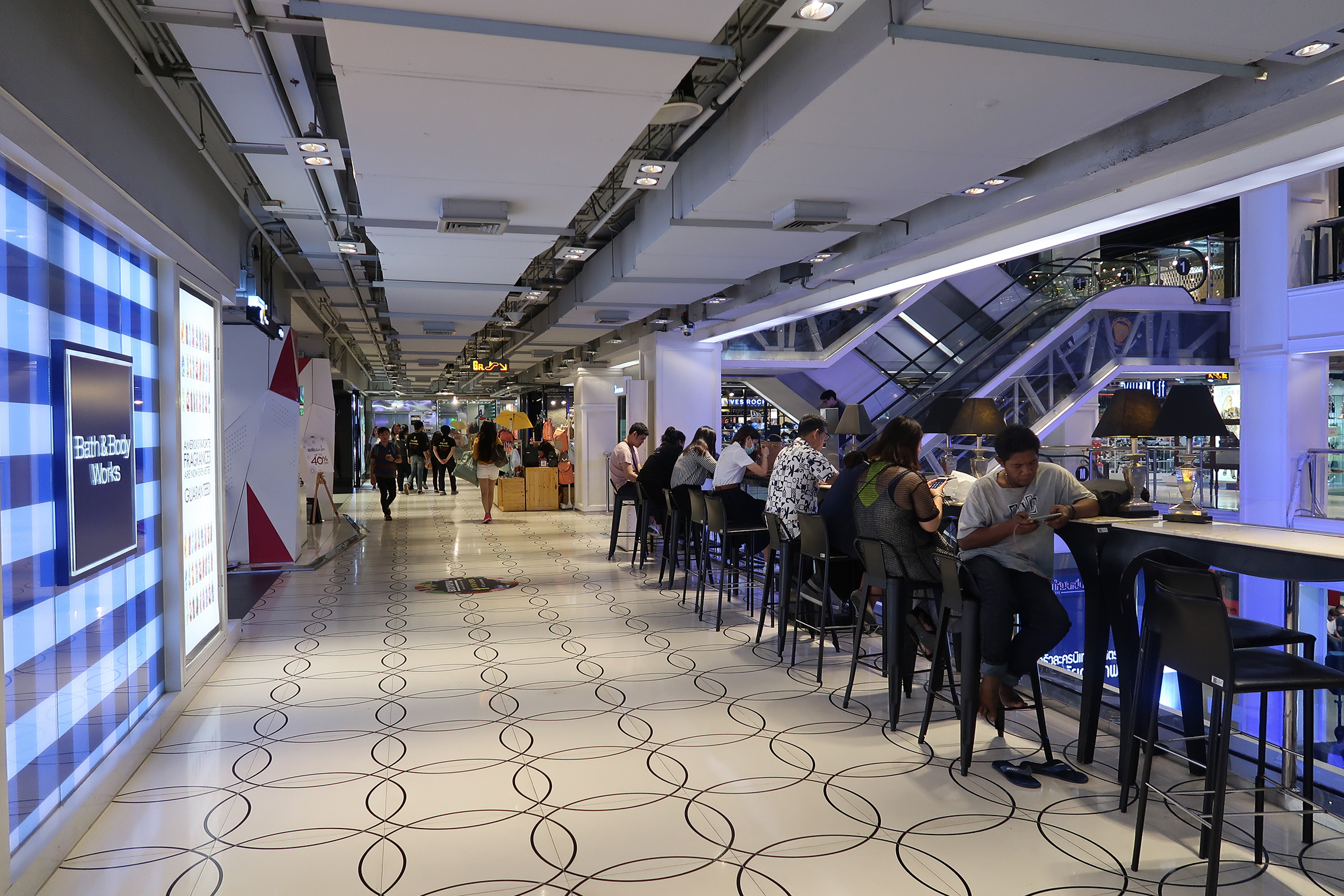
Seating area inside mall

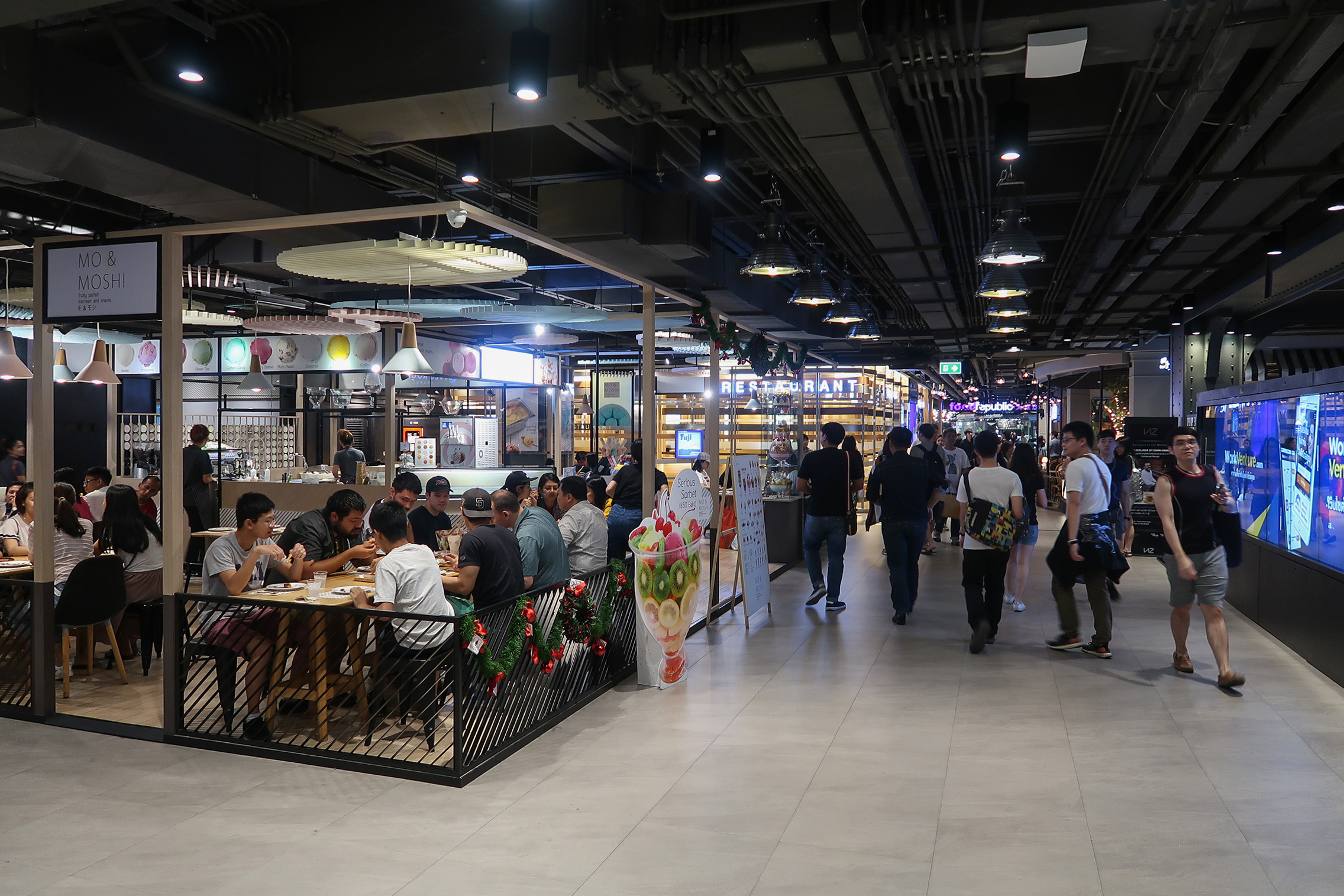
Restaurants

== Siam Discovery ==
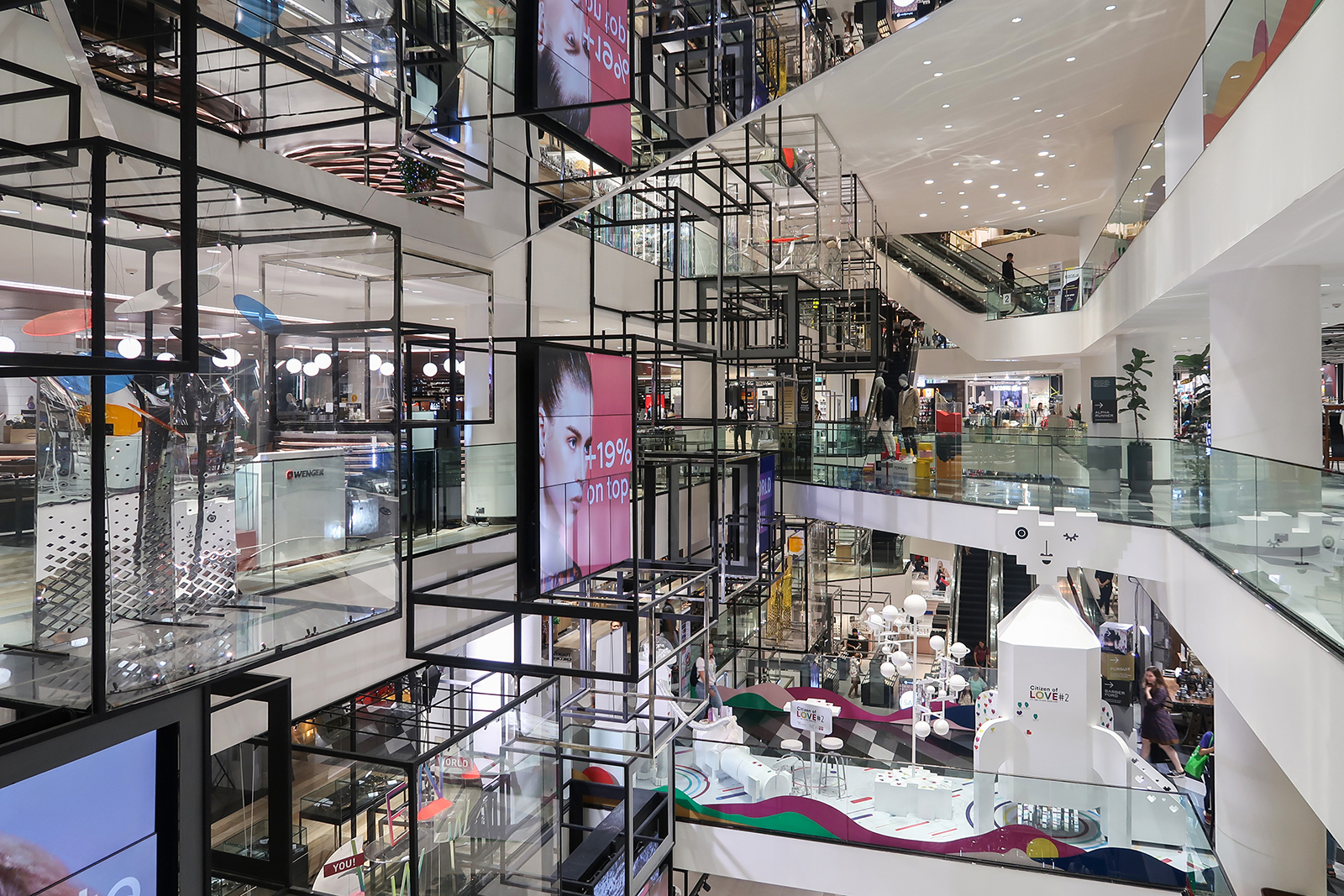
Siam Discovery Atrium

Siam Discovery (Thai: สยามดิสคัฟเวอรี) is a shopping center located in the same complex as Siam Center. It is adjacent to Siam Center and was completed in 1997. The mall underwent a large scale refurbishment in 2016 designed by Nendo.

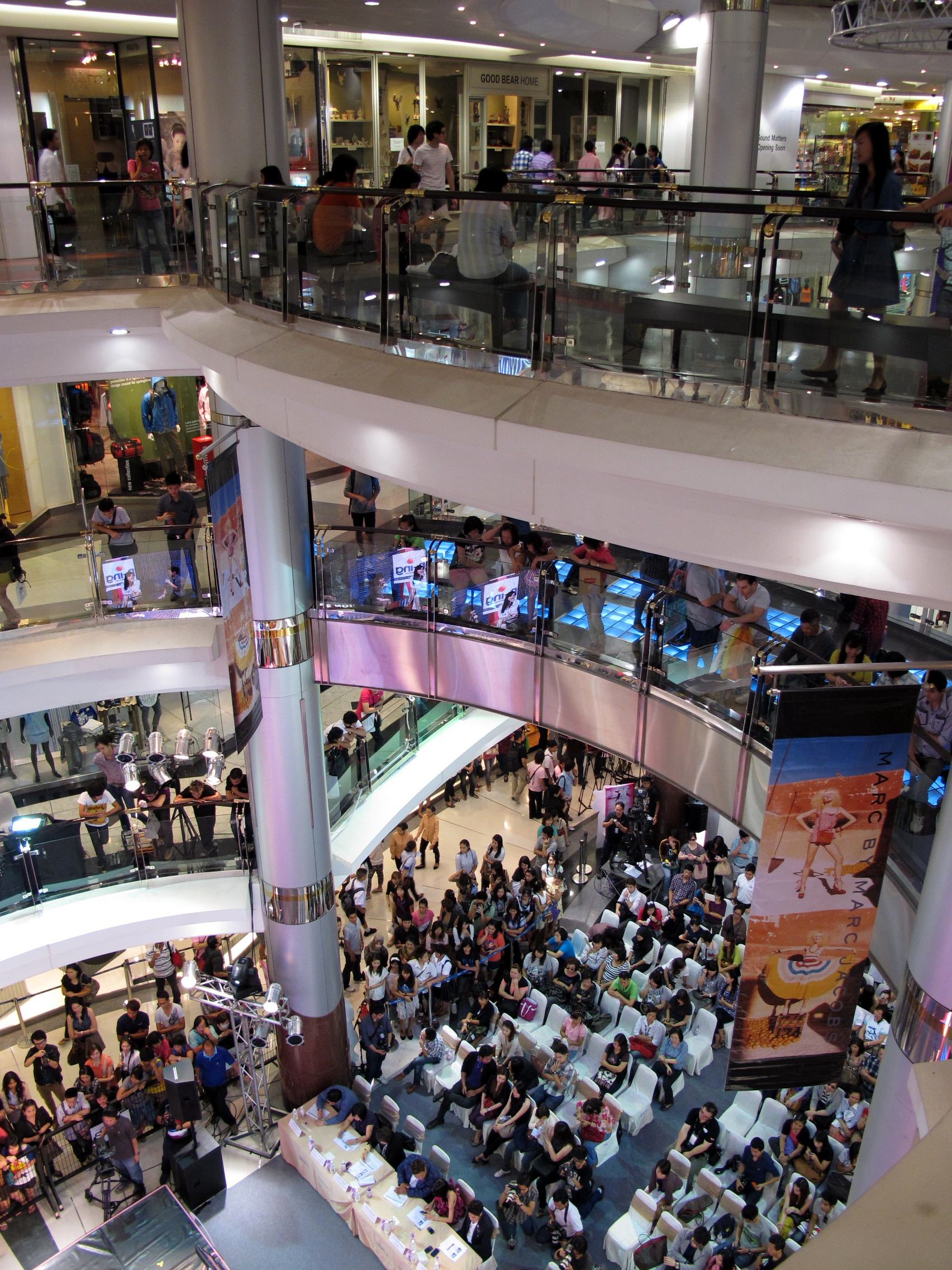
Atrium in 2011 before renovation

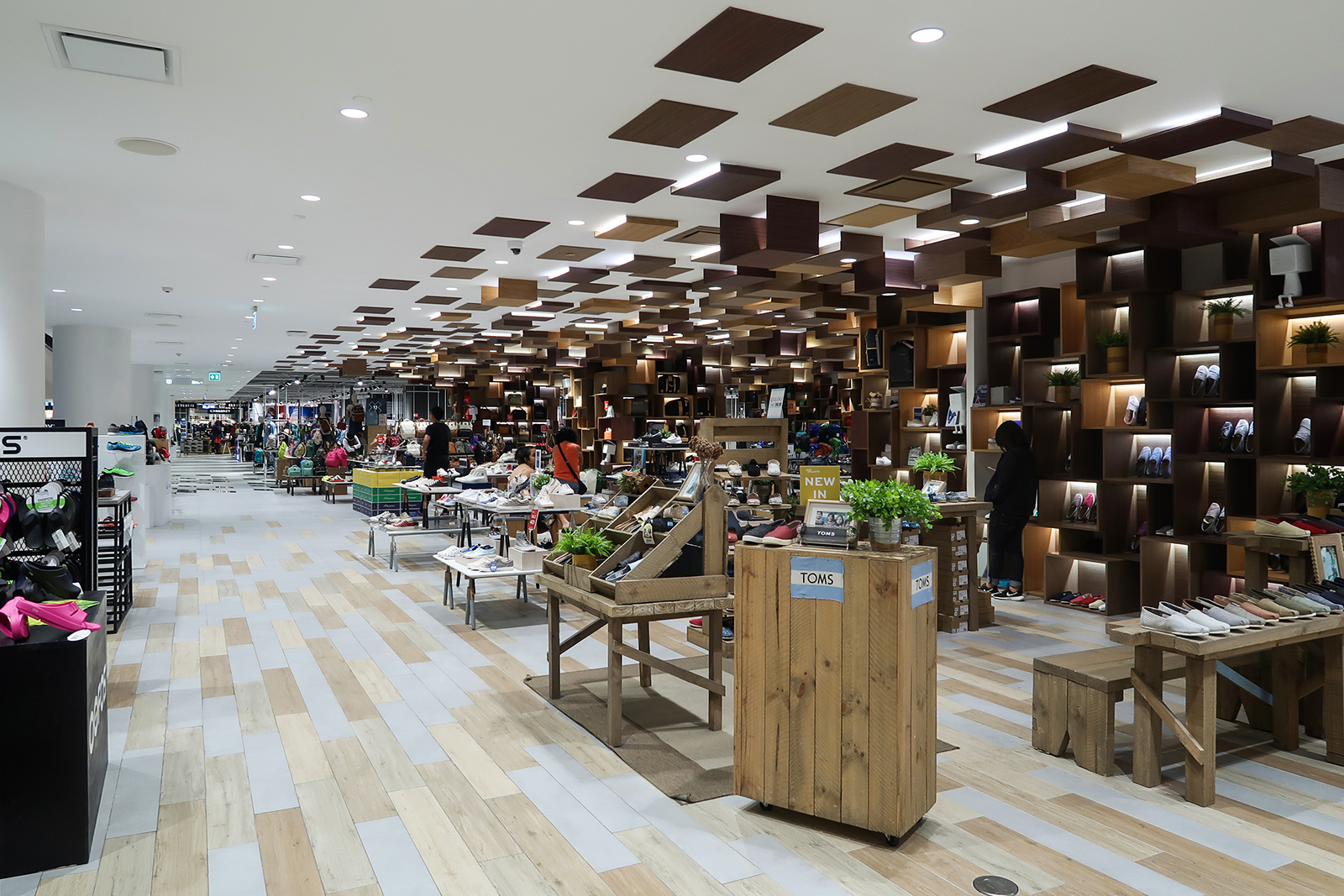
After renovation, the shops use open-shopfront design

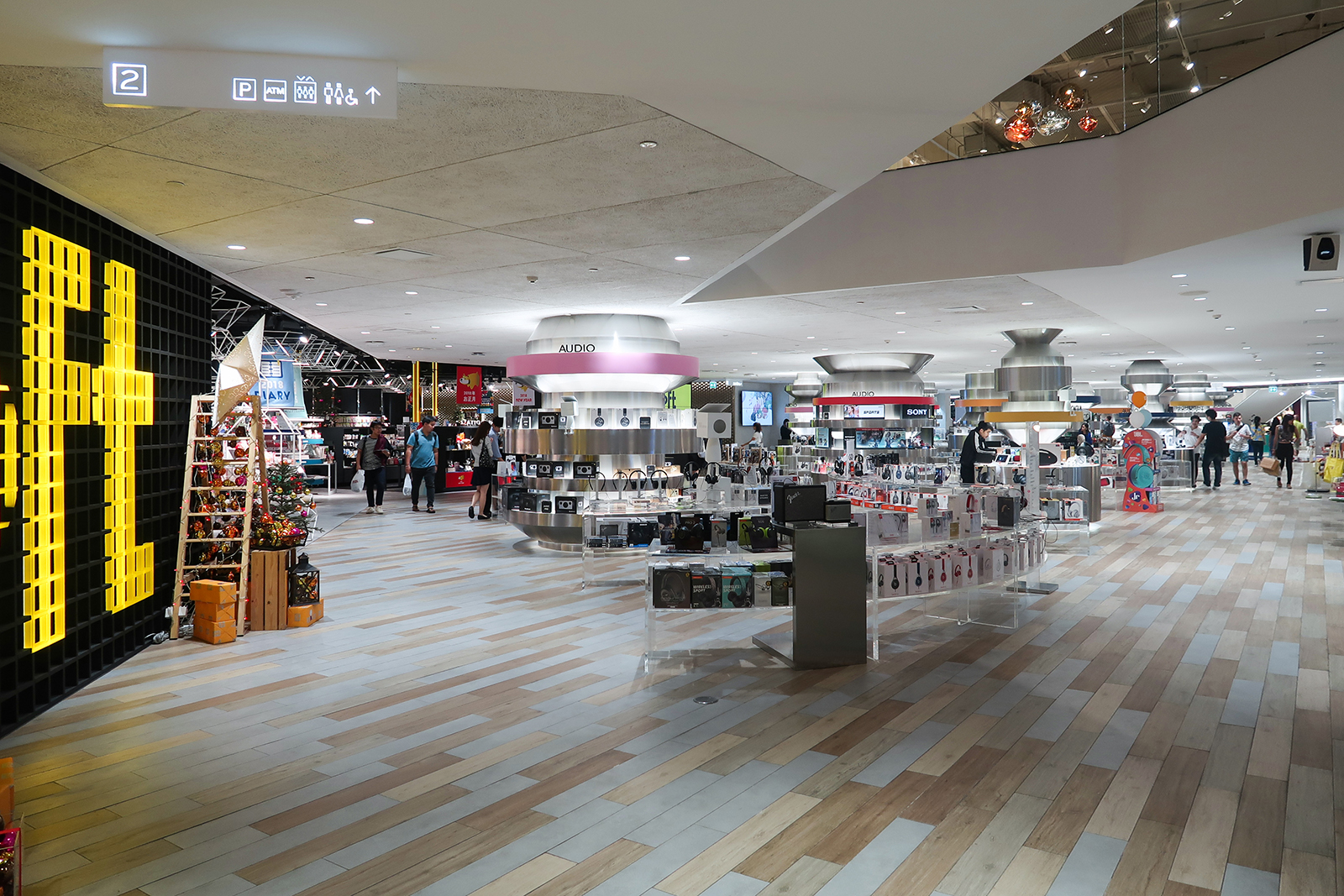
Level 2 shops

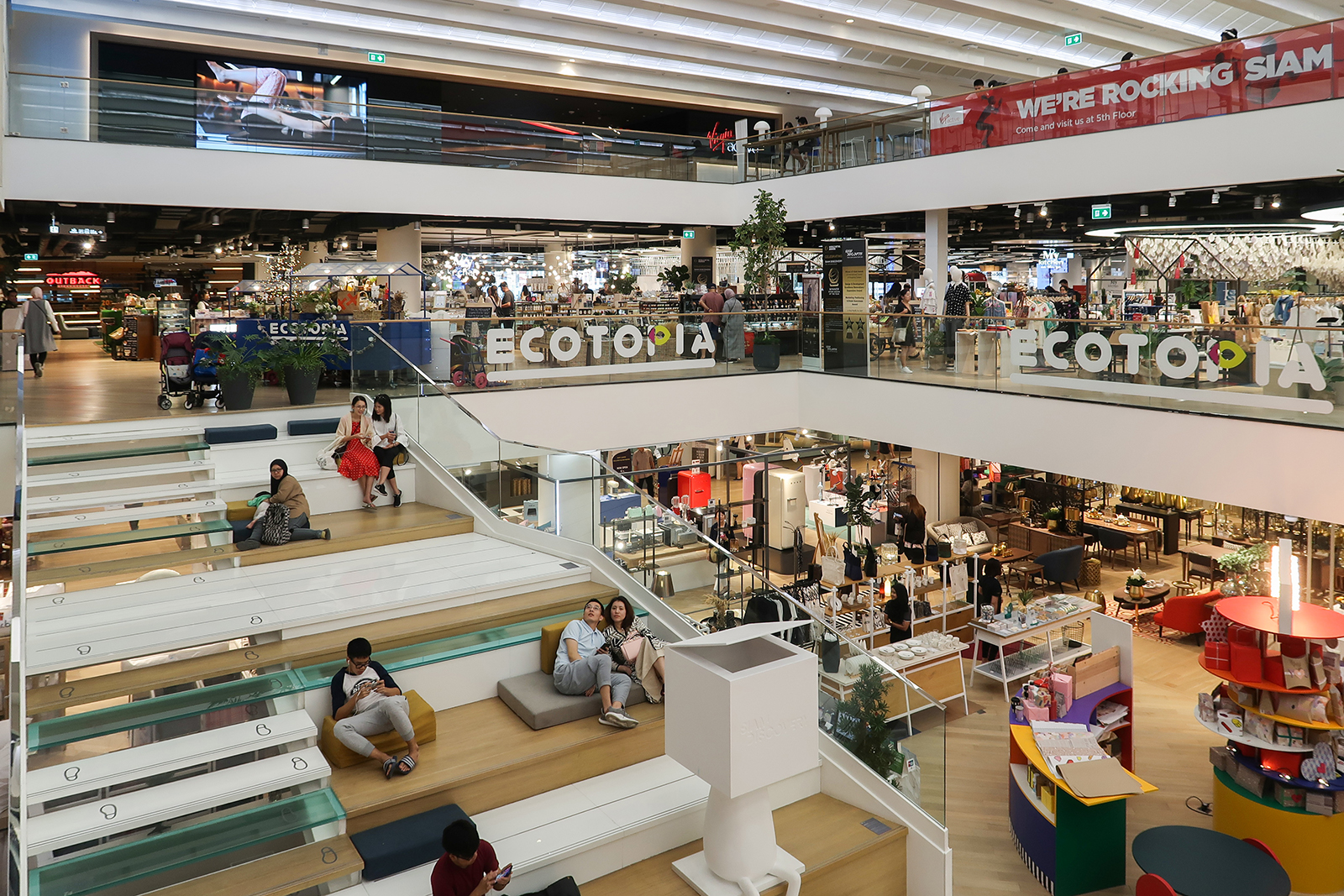
Atrium in Level 3

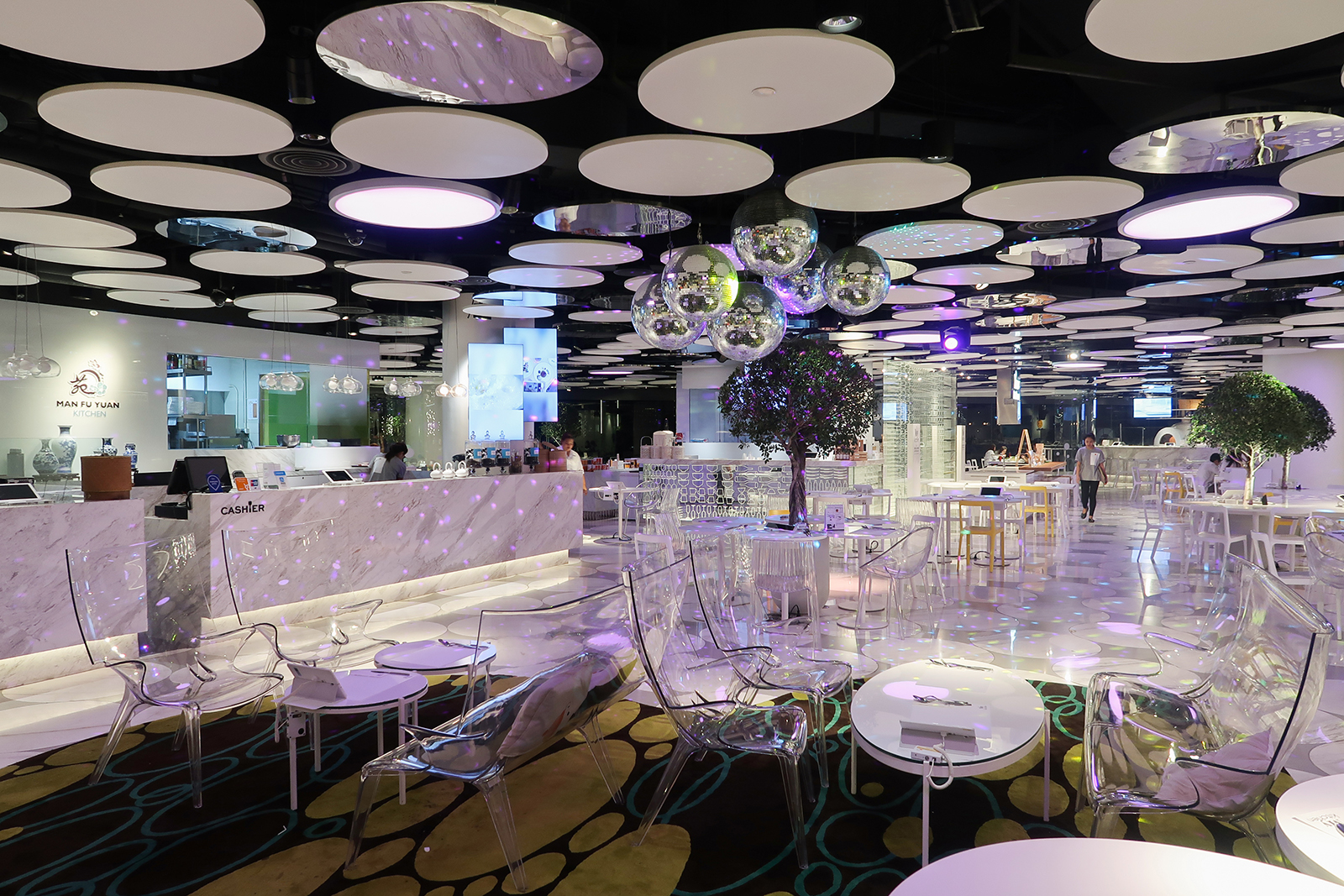
My Kitchen food court in Level 4

== Awards and recognition ==
- 2013: Best Commercial Renovation/Redevelopment Thailand "Siam Discovery Renovation” from the Asia Pacific Property Award

== See also ==
- List of shopping malls in Thailand
