= Boonyasak =

Boonyasak (Thai: บุญยศักดิ์) is a Thai surname. Notable people with the surname include:

- Daran Boonyasak (born 1979), Thai actress
- Laila Boonyasak (born 1982), Thai actress, sister of Daran
