= Only God Forgives (soundtrack) =

Only God Forgives (Original Motion Picture Soundtrack)

Soundtrack album by Cliff Martinez
- Released: July 16, 2013
- Recorded: 2013
- Genre: Film score
- Length: 57:16 (standard); 78:02 (deluxe)
- Label: Milan
- Producer: Cliff Martinez

Cliff Martinez chronology
Spring Breakers (2013)	Only God Forgives (2013)	Mea Culpa (2014)

Only God Forgives (Original Motion Picture Soundtrack) is the soundtrack to the 2013 film Only God Forgives directed by Nicolas Winding Refn and starred Ryan Gosling, Kristin Scott Thomas and Vithaya Pansringarm. The soundtrack featured musical score composed by Cliff Martinez and released through Milan Records on July 16, 2013.

== Development ==
Cliff Martinez composed the film's musical score in his second collaboration with Refn after Drive (2011). Through the film's score, he wanted to travel inside the protagonist's head, through the film's music as audience would be emotionally connected with the character through the music and wanted to become more psychological and less situational. When he received the film's final edit, Refn used numerous temp tracks throughout to guide him on the musical vocabulary; Bernard Herrmann's score for The Day the Earth Stood Still (1951) was used as one of the temp tracks in the edit. As the film is predominantly set in Thailand, Martinez thought of using Thai pop music and blending it to curate an hybrid score. Refn wanted Thai characters to sing the country/western songs in the film, but as he had to license those songs, Martinez decided to bring the musical authenticity by searching the specific soundscape from the country. Since karaoke is a part of the nightlife culture in Thailand, Martinez recorded five karaoke songs performed by Gregory Tripi and Mac Quayle, who were assistant composers at his team while Vithaya Pansringarm and Rhatha Phongam also performed one of the songs.

He eventually set up a mobile studio at his hotel room in Thailand using Macbook Pro and wrote the film score in five weeks. He used a three-string pin, predominantly used in the Northeastern part of Thailand, for the score. Initially, he wanted to replicate the Isan music with the use of electric guitar, bass, drums, horns, pin and cans which the bands in those regions use, but found it difficult to implement in the score. During the edit, Martinez was apprehensive of using an orchestral score for the romantic moments but as Refn liked that particular sequence, he eventually agreed for an orchestral music. The love theme had a real orchestra from Bratislava performing it. But due to the limited budget, he decided to record a fake orchestra using samplers, synthesisers and MIDI controls where he manipulated the orchestral sound to make it more authentic and believable.

== Release ==
Milan Records announced the soundtrack to Only God Forgives on May 7, 2013. The album consisted of 17 tracks along with a deluxe edition that contains additional six tracks. Both the editions were released on July 16, three days ahead. It was further issued in vinyl LPs with a limited edition artwork and pressed to 4,000 copies. A 7-inch double LP single that featured the track "Wanna Fight" in both standard (4 minutes and 50 seconds) and deluxe edition (4 minutes and 8 seconds) released in October 22.

== Reception ==
Critic based at The Film Scorer wrote "Martinez manages to combine Eastern and Western musical influences organically and deftly, rather than obviously or tritely, creating a fascinating and unique score." Andy Beta of Spin assigned 8 (out of 10) and wrote "Dreamy yet always on the razor's edge of turning into a nightmare, the composer's sound palette both widens and focuses here." Sean Wilson of MFiles wrote "Only God Forgives is more interesting and engaging than much of the composer's other work – but it's still vital to hear the music in its cinematic context. Only then will the contradictory layers of sound make sense." Dave Calhoun of Time Out described it as "buzzing, lowly pulsating". Critic based at Sputnikmusic wrote "the heft of the compositions on the Only God Forgives soundtrack will each produce an identical effect for listeners."

== Track listing ==
Only God Forgives (Original Motion Picture Soundtrack) standard edition track listing
No.	Title	Featuring artist(s)	Length
1.	"Only God Forgives"	Gregory Tripi	0:46
2.	"Ask Him Why He Killed My Brother"	Tripi	2:11
3.	"Chang and Sword"		2:24
4.	"Chang Vision"	Tripi	3:46
5.	"Do As Thou Will"		2:14
6.	"Can't Forget"	Mac Quayle; Vithaya Pansringarm	3:30
7.	"Crystal Checking In"	Tripi	1:57
8.	"More Hands"		2:45
9.	"Sister Part 1"	Tripi	3:09
10.	"Take It Off"	Quayle	2:41
11.	"Leave My Son In Peace"	Tripi; Quayle	4:50
12.	"Falling In Love"	Tripi; Rhatha Phongam	3:29
13.	"Crystal and the Bodybuilders"		4:05
14.	"Ladies Close Your Eyes"	Tripi	8:01
15.	"Bride of Chang"	Quayle	3:04
16.	"Wanna Fight"		4:50
17.	"You Are My Dream"	Proud	3:34
Total length:			57:16

Only God Forgives (Original Motion Picture Soundtrack) deluxe edition track listing
No.	Title	Length
18.	"Wanna Fight" (Bonus Edition)	4:08
19.	"Bride of Chang" (Mac Quayle Club Mix)	7:14
20.	"Mai Quits Masturbating"	4:05
21.	"Julian and the Body"	4:28
22.	"Time to Meet the Devil"	1:40
23.	"Put It Back On"	2:11
Total length:		78:02

== Chart performance ==
Chart (2013)	Peak position
UK Soundtrack Albums (OCC)	30
US Top Soundtracks (Billboard)	22
