= Samui Song =

- Film poster
- Directed by: Pen-Ek Ratanaruang
- Written by: Pen-Ek Ratanaruang
- Based on: The story by Pen-Ek Ratanaruang & Raymond Phathanavirangoon
- Produced by: Raymond Phathanavirangoon; Rasarin Tanalerttararom
- Starring: Chermarn Boonyasak; David Asavanond; Vithaya Pansringarm
- Cinematography: Chankit Chamnivikaipong
- Edited by: Patamanadda Yukol
- Music by: Koichi Shimizu
- Production companies: Samui Land Joint Venture Company Limited; Cinema22; Augenschein Filmproduktion; Tenk.tv; Bluering Company Ltd.
- Distributed by: Urban Distribution International
- Release dates: 30 August 2017 (Venice); 7 September 2017 (TIFF); 1 February 2018 (Thailand)
- Running time: 108 minutes
- Countries: Thailand; Germany; Norway
- Languages: Thai, English

Samui Song (Thai: ไม่มีสมุยสำหรับเธอ) is 2017 Thai noir crime thriller drama film directed and written by Pen-Ek Ratanaruang, and starring Chermarn Boonyasak and David Asavanond. It is his ninth feature film and tenth overall. The film had its world premiere in the "Venice Days (Giornate degli Autori)" section at the 74th Venice International Film Festival on August 30, 2017, and had a limited release in Thailand on February 1, 2018.

== Plot ==
Viyada or Vi (Chermarn Boonyasak), a Thai soap opera actress finds herself under the pressure of her husband, Jerome (Stephane Sednaoui), the rich foreigner who believes in a charismatic cult leader. According to this uncomfortable relationship, it has led her to a plan to kill her husband by hiring Guy Spencer (David Asavanond), a gunman who has trouble earning money to take care of his elderly invalid mother. However, when the plan is unsuccessful chaos ensues for both Viyada and Guy Spencer.

== Cast ==
- Chermarn Boonyasak as Viyada "Vi"
- David Asavanond as Guy Spencer
- Karen Gemma Dodgson as Worshiper
- Vithaya Pansringarm
- Stephane Sednaoui as Jerome Beaufoy
- Palika Suwannarak

== Production ==
Samui Song had been in the process of production since 2015 and took about 3 months on the production. However, because of the complicated plot and storylines, it took more than 1 year in the post-production. This film marks the reunion of Pen-Ek Ratanaruang and Chermarn Boonyasak, following their collaboration in the film Last Life in the Universe (2003).

== Awards and nominations ==
Year	Award	Category	Recipient(s)	Result	Ref.
2018	The BK Film Awards 2018	Best Comeback	Pen-Ek Ratanaruang	Won	
2018	The BK Film Awards 2018	Best Actress	Chermarn Boonyasak	Won	
2019	28th Suphannahong National Film Awards	Best Picture of the Year	Samui Song	Nominated	
2019	28th Suphannahong National Film Awards	Best Screenplay of the Year	Pen-Ek Ratanaruang	Nominated	
2019	28th Suphannahong National Film Awards	Best Leading Actress	Chermarn Boonyasak	Nominated	
2019	28th Suphannahong National Film Awards	Best Leading Actor	David Asavanond	Nominated	
2019	28th Suphannahong National Film Awards	Best Supporting Actor	Vithaya Pansringarm	Nominated	
2019	28th Suphannahong National Film Awards	Best Supporting Actress	Palika Suwannarak	Nominated	
2019	28th Suphannahong National Film Awards	Best Film Editing	Patamanadda Yukol	Nominated	
2019	28th Suphannahong National Film Awards	Best Original Score	Koichi Shimizu	Nominated	
2019	28th Suphannahong National Film Awards	Best Costume Design	Visakha Kongkha	Nominated	
2019	9th Thai Film Director Awards	Best Leading Actress	Chermarn Boonyasak	Nominated	
2019	9th Thai Film Director Awards	Best Leading Actor	David Asavanond	Nominated	
2019	27th Bangkok Critics Assembly Awards	Best Film	Samui Song	Nominated	
2019	27th Bangkok Critics Assembly Awards	Best Director	Pen-Ek Ratanaruang	Nominated	
2019	27th Bangkok Critics Assembly Awards	Best Screenplay	Pen-Ek Ratanaruang, Raymond Phathanavirangoon	Nominated	
2019	27th Bangkok Critics Assembly Awards	Best Leading Actress	Chermarn Boonyasak	Nominated	
2019	27th Bangkok Critics Assembly Awards	Best Supporting Actor	Vithaya Pansringarm	Nominated	
2019	27th Bangkok Critics Assembly Awards	Best Film Editing	Patamanadda Yukol	Nominated	
2019	27th Bangkok Critics Assembly Awards	Best Art Direction	Pawat Sawatchaimeth, Witthaya Chaimongkol	Nominated	
2019	15th Kom Chad Luek Awards	Best Film	Samui Song	Nominated	
2019	15th Kom Chad Luek Awards	Best Director - Film Category	Pen-Ek Ratanaruang	Nominated	
2019	15th Kom Chad Luek Awards	Best Screenplay - Film Category	Pen-Ek Ratanaruang	Nominated	
2019	15th Kom Chad Luek Awards	Best Leading Actress - Film Category	Chermarn Boonyasak	Nominated	
2019	15th Kom Chad Luek Awards	Best Leading Actor - Film Category	David Asavanond	Nominated	
2019	15th Kom Chad Luek Awards	Best Supporting Actress - Film Category	Palika Suwannarak	Nominated	
2019	16th Starpics Thai Film Awards	Best Picture	Samui Song	Nominated	
2019	16th Starpics Thai Film Awards	Best Director	Pen-Ek Ratanaruang	Nominated	
2019	16th Starpics Thai Film Awards	Best Screenplay	Pen-Ek Ratanaruang, Raymond Phathanavirangoon	Nominated	
2019	16th Starpics Thai Film Awards	Best Actress	Chermarn Boonyasak	Nominated	
2019	16th Starpics Thai Film Awards	Best Actor	David Asavanond	Nominated	
2019	16th Starpics Thai Film Awards	Best Supporting Actress	Palika Suwannarak	Nominated	
2019	16th Starpics Thai Film Awards	Best Film Editing	Patamanadda Yukol	Nominated	
2019	16th Starpics Thai Film Awards	Best Cinematography	Chankit Chamnivikaipong	Nominated	
2019	16th Starpics Thai Film Awards	Best Production Design	Pawat Sawatchaimeth, Witthaya Chaimongkol	Nominated	
2019	16th Starpics Thai Film Awards	Best Sound & Music	Koichi Shimizu, Saowakhon Muangkruan	Nominated	
