= 4bia =

- Theatrical release poster
- Directed by: Yongyoot Thongkongtoon; Banjong Pisanthanakun; Parkpoom Wongpoom; Paween Purijitpanya
- Written by: Yongyoot Thongkongtoon; Banjong Pisanthanakun; Parkpoom Wongpoom; Paween Purikitpanya; Eakasit Thairatana; Vanridee Pongsittisak; Amornthep Sukumanont; Sophon Sakdaphisit
- Produced by: Jira Maligool; Yongyoot Thongkongtoon; Chenchonnee Soonthornsaratul; Suwimon Techasupinan
- Starring: Laila Boonyasak; Maneerat Kham-uan; Apinya Sakuljaroensuk
- Cinematography: Somboon Phopitakkul; Niramon Ross
- Edited by: Paween Purikitpanya; Vijjapat Kojew; Thammarat Sumetsupachok; Surawut Tungkarak
- Music by: Terdsak Janpan
- Production companies: GMM Tai Hub; Jor Kwang Films
- Distributed by: GTH
- Release date: 25 April 2008
- Running time: 112 minutes
- Country: Thailand
- Language: Thai

4bia (Thai: สี่แพร่ง; RTGS: Si Phraeng; lit. 'Crossroads'), also known as Phobia, is a 2008 Thai horror anthology film directed by Youngyooth Thongkonthun, Banjong Pisanthanakun, Parkpoom Wongpoom, and Paween Purijitpanya, and starring Laila Boonyasak, Maneerat Kham-uan, and Apinya Sakuljaroensuk. The film consists of four segments: a lonely woman is haunted through text messages, a group of students are targeted by a deadly curse, friends are confronted with death during a camping trip, and a flight attendant is trapped aboard a plane with a corpse.

== Plot ==
=== Loneliness (เหงา) ===
Directed by Youngyooth Thongkonthun

Pin, a young woman stuck in her apartment due to the cast on her leg, communicates with the outside world via cell phone and text messages. She complains to her boyfriend that she feels so lonely. Every night, Pin exchanges text messages with a stranger, who asks to befriend her and seems friendly enough. The stranger says that he is in somewhere "cramped" for 100 days and is oddly only able to be contacted at night. After sending the mysterious stranger her photo, Pin asks for one in return and is sent the same photo. When she questions him, he says he is in the picture next to her. A ghostly face is slightly visible next to Pin's smiling face. As she researches recent deaths, Pin discovers that a man died and was buried with a cellphone so he can communicate with his mother or connect to someone else whenever he feels lonely. Pin then gets a text from the stranger, saying that he will come to her place now. All of the lights begin to go out and Pin cries in fear. She is then assaulted by the ghost and is thrown out of the window to her death. A scene from the past shows him receiving a text message from his girlfriend ending the relationship which causes him to commit suicide by walking in front of a taxi cab causing an accident, the same accident that was the cause of Pin's broken leg as she was inside the cab.

=== Deadly Charm (ยันต์สั่งตาย) ===
Directed by Paween Purikitpanya

A nerdy student named Ngid sees his school friends take some drugs, and he is beaten to death. One of the gang's member, Pink, is worried but fails to stop her friends from bullying Ngid. Unfortunately, when he is beaten, he curses his friends on a deadly charm, which requires a photo of a dead person with their eyes open. Things get worse when everything keeps moving by itself when ordered by Ngid's soul, and one by one the drug addicts start dying. Even though Pink did not beat him, Ngid's soul decides not to spare her too, because she had seen it all yet had not do anything to help him. In the end, a police officer comes by to warn her not to go outside, and is shocked to see Pink laughing after having gouged her own eyes; because the curse requires the victim to see the picture of a dead person, he cannot harm her anymore now that she has gotten rid of her ability to see.

=== The Man in the Middle (คนกลาง) ===
Directed by Banjong Pisanthanakun

Four friends, Aey, Ter, Shin, and Phuak, go river rafting in a lonely jungle in Chiang Mai. That night while camping, Aey tells his friends that if he were to die, the person who sleeps in the middle will be the next to die along with him. The next day, as the four friends navigate the river rapids, Aey is thrown from the raft and cannot be located. After many hours of searching, the three remaining friends give up and decide to stay and camp overnight. Shaken by Aey's death tale, the three friends fight over who has to sleep in the middle, eventually coming to an arrangement where none of them need to. Later that night, Aey arrives at the camp and enters the tent, but ongoing strange events make his friends suspicious. Ter, Shin and Phuak leave the tent for a "smoke" and Shin then finds Aey's body. Horrified, Ter, Shin and Phuak run into the woods where they are shocked to find their own dead bodies floating in the river. It is revealed that all four had drowned when the raft tipped over in the rapids, but only Aey accepted his death, while the rest continued to ignore the fact that they had died. In the end, the four friends bond together as spirits.

=== Flight 224 (เที่ยวบิน 224) ===
Directed by Parkpoom Wongpoom

Flight attendant Pim is secretly having an affair with Prince Albert of Virnistan. One day she is ordered to go aboard an airliner on a charter flight for Princess Sophia, the wife of the Prince. Her fellow stewardess, Tui, is unable to attend the flight as her brother Ter (from the previous story) had been found drowned in Chiang Mai. What was supposed to be an ordinary flight turns into something tragic when the princess suffers a deadly allergic reaction to Pim's lunch as it contains shrimp to which the princess is allergic to. After the royal house of Virnistan requests that her corpse be sent back immediately for cremation, Pim is required to remain on the plane and escort the body - the only passenger - for the return flight. As the Princess tries to get out of her shroud, Pim's worst nightmare begins. When the plane lands in United Kingdom, Pim's body is found lying on the floor, under the feet of the intact enshrouded corpse of Princess Sophia.

== Cast ==
- Laila Boonyasak as Pim (segment "Flight 244")
- Maneerat Kham-uan as Pin (segment "Loneliness")
- Apinya Sakuljaroensuk as Pink (segment "Deadly Charm")
- Witawat Singlampong as Diaw (segment "Deadly Charm")
- Nattapong Chartpong as Ter (segment "The Man In The Middle")
- Kantapat Permpoonpatcha as Aey (segment "The Man In The Middle")
- Pongsatorn Jongwilat as Puak (segment "The Man In The Middle")
- Wiwat Krongrasri as Shin (segment "The Man In The Middle")
- Chon Wachananon as Yo (segment "Deadly Charm")
- Nada Lesongan as Princess Sophia (segment "Flight 244")
- Nattapol Pohphay as Ngid (segment "Deadly Charm")
- Wirot Ngaoumphanphaitoon as Ton (segment "Loneliness")

== Release ==
The film premiered on 25 April 2008 and was part on 20 October 2008 at the Toronto After Dark Film Festival, the European premiere was on 23 January 2009 as part of the International Film Festival Rotterdam. In the UK will release as direct-to-video production on 10 May 2010.

== Sequel ==
A sequel, Phobia 2 was released in 2009 with 5 new segments from 3 directors from the first film and 2 new directors.

== See also ==
- List of ghost films
