= Eternity (2010 Thai film) =

- Film poster
- Directed by: Pundhevanop Dhewakul
- Screenplay by: Pundhevanop Dhewakul
- Based on: Eternity by Malai Choopiniji
- Produced by: Tempun Muttawapun
- Starring: Ananda Everingham; Chermarn Boonyasak; Teerapong Liaorakwong
- Cinematography: Teerawat Rujintham; Phanom Phromachat
- Edited by: Phannipha Kabillikavanich; Sunit Asavinikul
- Music by: Chamras Saewataporn
- Distributed by: Sahamongkol Film International
- Release date: 16 September 2010
- Running time: 184 minutes
- Country: Thailand
- Languages: Thai; Lanna; English
- Box office: $1,147,578

Eternity (Thai: ชั่วฟ้าดินสลาย) is a 2010 Thai erotic romantic drama film by Pundhevanop Dhewakul. It is based on Malai Choopiniji's novel, which was earlier adapted to film in 1957 by Rattana Pestonji. The film stars Ananda Everingham and Chermarn Boonyasak as the doomed lovers Sangmong, and his uncle's wife, Yupadee, respectively. The film won five awards, including Best Actor and Best Picture, and gained seven nominations in the Thailand Film Awards.

== Plot ==
The story begins with a young man visiting a village in Burma. One night, a beautiful woman comes into his bedroom and attempts to seduce him. She suddenly leaves, frightened by the sounds of screams coming from outside. The next day, the young man asks Thip, Ni Han's right-hand man, about the screams. Thip then tells him the story of Yupadee and Sangmong, Ni Han's former wife and nephew.

Sangmong's parents died when he was very young. He was raised by Ni Han, who loved him as a son. Sangmong received a good education and returned home when he graduated. He was a conservative man with traditional values, and his days consisted of reading books and working for his uncle. With very little social life, he seemingly has little interest in women, the opposite of Ni Han who is a womaniser.

Wanting to make Sangmong into a man, Ni Han has Thip take Sangmong to a brothel for him to learn and enjoy carnal pleasures. Although the woman offered to Sangmong was beautiful, he turns away from her and leaves. Later, Ni Han and Thip ask him why he did not have sex with her, to which Sangmong replies that he wants to wait until marriage. Ni Han respects his decision and promises to find him a proper wife for him to settle down with.

While attending an international sport club in Bangkok, Ni Han meets a widow named Yupadee, and falling for her charms and modern ideas, marries her. When he brings her home to meet everyone in the village, Yupadee shows an instant liking to Sangmong. The two become close friends, which Ni Han encourages as he believes Yupadee will help Sangmong break out of his shell and become more sociable.

Yupadee sends Sangmong mixed signals by being affectionate one moment and cold the next. She tells a little bit of her deceased first husband and past. Sangmong meanwhile develops an infatuation with Yupadee, which grows stronger after she nurses him back to health from a fever. Ni Han then announces he must leave on a business trip and decides to take Yupadee with him, but she fakes a pregnancy in order to stay behind and be alone with Sangmong.

With Ni Han away, the two consummate their affair and sneak away to have sex. Many of the servants and Thip know about their relationship but remain quiet, even when Ni Han returned, but one servant bravely tells Ni Han about the affair, which he refuses to believe. He finally learns about them when he secretly catches the two in Sangmong's bed, proclaiming their love for one another until eternity. The next day he reveals that he knows about them, and he gives Yupadee to Sangmong, chaining their wrists–so they can stay together until eternity–and banishes them to a small cabin in the woods.

The lovers initially take his punishment as a joke and enjoy their time together. Soon after, they grow tired and begin to resent one another. They ask Ni Han for forgiveness and to release them; he offers them a gun as his only answer. Refusing to kill himself or Yupadee, Sangmong attempts to run away on a ferry that comes to the village every few months. To avoid suspicion, he tries to cut their chain with an axe. Yupadee stops him, asking if he would leave her if the chain ever breaks. When Sangmong doesn't answer her, she refuses to allow him to break the chain and Ni Han's men find them, and they are taken back to the cabin.

Sangmong takes the gun and offers to shoot himself to release Yupadee, who claims she is pregnant. Yupadee steals the gun from him and shoots herself instead. Sangmong loses conscious afterwards. He awakens to find her rotting corpse and tries to run but is still chained to her. A servant enters the cabin and chops Yupadee's hand off, freeing Sangmong. Sangmong becomes mad with grief and loses his sanity. Ni Han takes Sangmong back when he sees his condition. Through the years, Sangmong has roamed the village, screaming in agony like a wild madman.

Throughout the story, the young man in the beginning has sexual encounters with three beautiful woman in the night. Thip later tells him that the three women are actually Ni Han's women. Frightened, the young man hurries to pack up his belongings. The next day, the young man bravely goes to see Ni Han, who is surrounded by the three women and chains hanging on a column. Ni Han greets him and casually comments that he reminds him of his nephew, much to the young man's horror. Before he leaves, the young man encounters Sangmong, who gives him a book, and the young man thanks him before riding his horse and departing the village.

== Cast ==
- Ananda Everingham as Sangmong
- Chermarn Boonyasak as Yupadee
- Teerapong Liaorakwong as Phapo
- Sakrat Ruekthamrong as Thip
- Phenphet Phenkul as Niphon
- Daraneenuch Photipit as Makhin
- Mario Maurer as Young Buddhist Monk
