= The Teacher's Diary =

2014 film

- Theatrical release poster
- Thai: คิดถึงวิทยา; RTGS: Khit Thueng Witthaya
- Directed by: Nithiwat Tharathorn
- Written by: Sopana Chaowwiwatkul; Supalerk Ningsanond; Nithiwat Tharathorn; Thodsapon Thiptinnakorn
- Produced by: Jira Maligool; Vanridee Pongsittisak; Suvimon Techasupinun; Chenchonnee Soonthonsaratul
- Starring: Laila Boonyasak; Sukrit Wisetkaew; Sukollawat Kanarot
- Cinematography: Naruphol Chokanapitak
- Edited by: Pongsakorn Charnchalermchal; Thammarat Sumethsupachok
- Music by: Hualampong Riddim; Vichaya Vatanasapt
- Production company: Jorkwang Films
- Distributed by: GTH
- Release date: 20 March 2014
- Running time: 90 minutes
- Country: Thailand
- Language: Thai

The Teacher's Diary (Thai: คิดถึงวิทยา; RTGS: Khit Thueng Witthaya) is a 2014 Thai romance drama film directed by Nithiwat Tharathorn. It was selected as the Thai entry for the Best Foreign Language Film at the 87th Academy Awards, but was not nominated. The film was remade in India as Notebook, released in March 2019.

The film is based on a real life teacher of a houseboat school, Ban Ko Allocated School (Ruen Phae Branch), on the Ping River at the Bhumibol Dam in Mae Ping National Park in Li district, Lamphun province. The motif of a left behind diary is based on an incident from the marriage of a producer's friend.

== Story ==
The story is told interchangeably between two timelines, although this plot summary will be written in a linear structure.

In 2011, a stubborn teacher Ann was transferred by her director to the houseboat school in a remote area as a punishment of her refusal to erase her tattoos. Ann had to teach a group of young students who lived around the dam area, and the houseboat had no access to both water and electricity. Ann’s supporting teacher, Gigi, took a memento selfie but only Ann’s tattoos appeared in it. During her stay, Ann routinely vented her anger and loneliness into a diary. Nevertheless, Ann remained at the school, as she could not bear to leave her students. Ann’s boyfriend, teacher Nui, was upset that her ever-stubborn nature led to her punishment. One day, a bloated corpse of tourist was found beneath the toilet area of the houseboat, scaring all children and Gigi. Ann, reluctant to wait for authorities from the mainland, decided to retrieve the body to calm her students. This greatly strengthened their relationships, and Ann became like their beloved guardian, while Gigi promptly left the school.

Ann’s diary started to be more positive and filled with stories about her students. Ann was also proved to be a talented teacher who used friendly competition and rewarding system to motivate her students, in contrast to traditional tutelage. Chon, a sixth grade student, struggled with basic algebra and expressed his desire to just be a fisherman like his family. Chon eventually stopped coming to school, much to Ann’s dismay. Confronting his family, Ann discovered that Chon and other students came from poor families and they never wanted to pursue higher education, having their lives stuck in the remote area with no dreams. Ann was re-evaluating her determination as a teacher, when Nui got promoted as the school director’s assistant and asked Ann to teach in his prestigious school in the mainland. Nui also proposed to Ann, and she later left the houseboat school. Her diary was accidentally left there.

One year later, a wrestler-turned-teacher Song was transferred to the houseboat school. Song found Ann’s diary in the classroom, and read them as a way to cope with isolation. He slowly fell in love with a mysterious Ann, bonding over their shared experiences of their time in this school. His connection with students, however, started out terribly as Song approached them with dictatorship and physical punishment. He later gained affection when he rescued them from a venomous snake, and their relationships improved. He also persuaded Chon’s family for him to return to school, learning about his story from Ann’s diary. Despite his effort, his teaching skills were still much inferior from Ann’s, and all students struggled to keep their grades.

Curious and lovestruck with Ann, he assigned all students to a school cleaning in hope that they would inadvertently come across some clues of her. A student found a picture that Gigi took one year ago and recalled Ann’s star tattoos on her arm. Song set out to find Ann at her new school, having the star tattoos as his only clue. Song ran into Ann during her class, but did not recognize her as she had erased her tattoos prior, and walked away. Ann was teaching her class about buoyancy force using a swimming pool, angering a senior teacher who accused her of endangering students for the sake of physics. Nui reluctantly prohibited her from using unorthodox teaching again, and Ann expressed her frustration with this traditional school. Upon discovering one day that Nui had an affair and impregnated another woman during Ann’s stay at the houseboat, she promptly resigned and asked her former director, who had forgiven her past misdemeanor, to teach in the houseboat school again.

In the present time, students at the houseboat are all happy to see Ann again. Ann also learns that Chon returned to school some time before her return, being persuaded by Song who taught him to value education so people would not hustle him. Ann finds her forgotten diary in the classroom, and discovers that Song has written many entries in there. Because of their shared experiences, he confessed to yearn and feel close to her even though they never met. It was revealed that he used her stories to improve his teaching, especially for Chon who still struggled in class. When he learnt that Chon never traveled by train and failed to understand his mathematic question, Song created a makeshift “train” using the motorboat to tow the houseboat and ride around the dam, helping him learn about basic equation. All students eventually passed their last exams thanks to his improved teaching, except for Chon despite his best effort. Feeling guilty, Song resigned from the houseboat school to pursue advanced education, although he was relieved knowing that Ann would soon return. Song thanked her for the warmth and guidance throughout the year, and wished her diary find her well before parting.

Ann tries to find Song but to no avail, with her only clue being a portrait from his application form to the houseboat school. A lovestruck Ann is excited to learn that Song, who is still helping the houseboat to get electricity and other appliances, will visit the students soon. However, Nui comes and begs Ann to mend their relationships, and reluctant Ann decides to forgive him. Nui and Ann leave the houseboat school on the first day of a semester break, with students lamenting that Ann will not get to meet Song.

On her way back to the mainland, Nui hands Ann her diary, claiming that she left it at the houseboat. She reads her last entry, where she writes to thank Song about her return and how he has influenced his students, reminding Ann of what it is to be a teacher. Nui and Ann are stopped by the passing train, which reminds Ann of Song's effort to teach children who never rode on one before. Ann finally decides to let Nui go and go back to the houseboat school, where she finds Song fixing a power generator. She hands him her diary and Song smiles, knowing instantly who Ann is. They both introduce themselves to each other happily.

== Cast ==
- Laila Boonyasak as Ann
- Sukrit Wisetkaew as Song
- Sukollawat Kanarot as Nui
- Chutima Teepanat as Nam
- Witawat Singlampong as Nam's New Boyfriend

== See also ==
- List of submissions to the 87th Academy Awards for Best Foreign Language Film
- List of Thai submissions for the Academy Award for Best Foreign Language Film
