= Only God Forgives =

2013 film by Nicolas Winding Refn

- US theatrical release poster
- Directed by: Nicolas Winding Refn
- Written by: Nicolas Winding Refn
- Produced by: Lene Børglum; Sidonie Dumas; Vincent Maraval
- Starring: Ryan Gosling; Kristin Scott Thomas; Vithaya Pansringarm
- Cinematography: Larry Smith
- Edited by: Matthew Newman
- Music by: Cliff Martinez
- Production companies: Gaumont; Wild Bunch; Space Rocket Nation; Motel Movies; Bold Films
- Distributed by: Scanbox Entertainment (Scandinavia); Wild Side Films (France)
- Release dates: 22 May 2013 (Cannes); 30 May 2013 (Denmark)
- Running time: 90 minutes
- Countries: Denmark; France; Thailand; United States; Sweden
- Languages: English; Thai
- Budget: $4.8 million
- Box office: $10.6 million

Only God Forgives is a 2013 action-thriller film written and directed by Nicolas Winding Refn and stars Ryan Gosling, Kristin Scott Thomas and Vithaya Pansringarm. It was shot on location in Bangkok, Thailand, and as with the director's earlier film Drive, it was dedicated to Chilean director Alejandro Jodorowsky. The surreal and neo-noir film competed for the Palme d'Or at the 2013 Cannes Film Festival.

Only God Forgives premiered at the 2013 Cannes Film Festival to polarized reviews from critics who praised its soundtrack, action sequences and Refn's traditional style, but was heavily criticised for its screenwriting and characterization.

== Plot ==
Julian and Billy are brothers and American expatriates, who run a Muay Thai boxing club in Bangkok as a front for their drug dealing operations. One night, Billy goes looking for sex and visits a brothel, saying he wants a 14-year-old girl, but the brothel-keeper refuses. Enraged, Billy attacks him with a wine bottle and breaks into the room where the prostitutes are on display before attacking one of them. At another location, Billy violently assaults and kills an underage prostitute before being cornered by Thai police. Chang, who is a vigilante-type police lieutenant, brings the girl's father Choi to identify his daughter's body and allows Choi to beat Billy to death. Afterward, Chang severs Choi's right forearm with his sword as punishment for allowing his daughter to be a prostitute in the first place.

Upon discovering Billy's death, Julian and his crew confront Choi, but Julian spares his life after hearing his version of the facts. Crystal, who is Julian and Billy's mother and boss of their family's criminal operations, arrives in Bangkok and demands that Julian kill the man responsible for his brother's death. Julian refuses, ultimately believing that Choi's revenge was justified. Crystal successfully orders Choi to be killed by a fighter in her sons' gym, upon which she learns of Chang's involvement in Billy's death. Crystal meets with a rival drug dealer named Byron and offers to cut him into her drug operation in exchange for a hit on Chang.

Meanwhile, Chang investigates Choi's murder and correctly concludes that Julian is not the killer. That evening, Julian brings Mai, a prostitute posing as his girlfriend, to meet Crystal at a restaurant. Crystal sees through the ruse, where she viciously insults Mai and belittles Julian's sexual dysfunction, demeaning him in comparison to his dead brother.

Two hitmen hired by Byron attempt to kill Chang with machine guns at a restaurant, causing the deaths of numerous customers and two of Chang's men. Chang shoots one of the assailants and captures the other, whom he also tortures for information. The hitman leads Chang to Li Po, who is revealed to have resorted to arranging hits to provide for his disabled son. Chang kills the hitman with his sword but chooses to spare Li Po. Chang then finds Byron in a club and graphically tortures him to death, seeking to learn who ordered the hit against him.

After recognizing Chang as the man from his visions and failing to follow him, Julian eventually finds Chang and challenges him to a fight at his boxing club. Chang easily defeats Julian, who cannot manage to land a single blow. Afterwards, Crystal tells Julian that Chang has figured out that she ordered the hit, and pleads with Julian to kill Chang. Crystal promises that after Julian eliminates Chang, they can go back home and she will be a true mother to him. Julian and his associate Charlie infiltrate Chang's home and plan to ambush him. Upon learning that Charlie was instructed by Crystal to execute the entire family, Julian kills Charlie before he can kill Chang's daughter.

Chang confronts Crystal in her hotel room, where she tells him about Julian's violent behaviour. Chang stabs Crystal in the throat. Later, Julian returns to the hotel and finds his mother's corpse, where he cuts open her abdomen and shoves his hand inside it. Julian later stands in a field with Chang, offering him his hands voluntarily so they can be severed with the same weapon that killed Crystal. Later, Chang performs a song in a karaoke club filled with fellow police officers.

== Cast ==
- Ryan Gosling as Julian Thompson, an American who lives in Bangkok and "is a respected figure in the criminal underworld" according to a production synopsis. Gosling was in negotiations to star in the film in June 2011 after Luke Evans dropped out due to scheduling conflicts with The Hobbit: An Unexpected Journey. Gosling had undertaken Muay Thai training in preparation for the role by that September, which included 2–3 hour daily sessions. Refn also participated in the training. Gosling and Refn had recently worked together on the neo-noir action drama Drive (2011). Julian speaks only 17 lines throughout the film. The idea for Julian to stick his hand into his dead mother's womb came from Gosling himself.
- Kristin Scott Thomas as Crystal Thompson, Julian and Billy's mother, who is described as "a merciless and terrifying mafia godmother" combining elements of Lady Macbeth and Donatella Versace. Scott Thomas was cast by May 2011.
- Vithaya Pansringarm as Lieutenant Chang / "The Angel of Vengeance", a man that believes himself to be God "[i]n the sense that God in the Old Testament is saying 'I can be cruel, you have to fear me' as 'I can be kind, you have to love me.'" Pansringarm did his own Thai boxing and singing for his role. Refn stated in an interview: "The character of One Eye went into Driver then went into the Thai police lieutenant. They're the same character played by three different actors [...] a mythological creature that has a mysterious past but cannot relate to reality because he's heightened and he's pure fetish."
- Gordon Brown as Gordon, Julian and Billy's lieutenant. Brown earlier played a walk-on role in Refn's Bronson and a supporting part in Valhalla Rising.
- Rhatha Phongam as Mai, a prostitute associated with Julian
- Tom Burke as Billy Thompson, Julian's older brother
- Byron Gibson as Byron
- Danai Thiengdham as Li Po
- Sahajak Boonthanakit as Police Colonel Kim
- Nophand Boonyai as Charlie
- Teerawat Mulvilai as Ko Sam
- Kovit Wattanakul as Choi Yan Lee
- Wittchuta Watjanarat as Ma Fong

== Production ==
Refn has said that "[f]rom the beginning, [he] had the idea of a thriller produced as a western, all in the Far East, and with a modern cowboy hero." He originally planned to direct Only God Forgives directly after Valhalla Rising (2009), but he accepted Gosling's request to direct Drive instead. Gosling has described the script of Only God Forgives as "the strangest thing I've ever read and it's only going to get stranger." Like Drive, the film was largely shot chronologically and scenes were often edited the day they were shot.

Footage was screened at the 2012 Cannes Film Festival. Refn drew a connection between Only God Forgives and Drive, saying that "[Only God Forgives] is very much a continuation of that language"—"[i]t's based on real emotions, but set in a heightened reality. It's a fairy tale."

== Reception ==
The film received a very divided response at its Cannes press screening; it was booed by many of the audience of journalists and critics while also receiving a standing ovation. It received a mixed response from mainstream critics: review aggregator Rotten Tomatoes gives the film a score of 41% based on reviews from 166 critics, with a weighted average of 5.4/10. The site's consensus states: "Director Refn remains as visually stylish as ever, but Only God Forgives fails to add enough narrative smarts or relatable characters to ground its beautifully filmed depravity." Metacritic assigns the film a weighted average rating of 37 out of 100 based on the reviews of 39 professional critics, indicating "generally unfavorable reviews".

Robbie Collin of The Daily Telegraph reflected concerns over the film in a three out of five star review. "The film's characters are non-people; the things they say to each other are non-conversations, the events they enact are non-drama," he wrote. But he praised Refn for following up his commercially successful film Drive with "...this abstruse, neon-dunked nightmare that spits in the face of coherence and flicks at the earlobes of good taste".

Peter Bradshaw of The Guardian gave it five out of five stars, calling it gripping and praising the "pure formal brilliance" of every scene and frame, though he notes that it will "have people running for the exits, and running for the hills" with its extreme violence. In an alternative review published in The Guardian, John Patterson was highly critical of the film, citing its lack of originality and the low degree of focus on plot: "Somewhere in here is a story that Refn can hardly be bothered to tell... I feel the ghosts of other movies—his influences, his inspirations—crowding in on his own work, suffocating him, and somehow leaving less of him on screen."

Bill Gibron of PopMatters wrote "David Lynch must be laughing. If he had created something like Only God Forgives, substituting his own quirky casting for the rather staid choices made by actual director Nicolas Winding Refn, he would have walked away from Cannes 2013 with yet another Palme d'Or, another notch in his already sizeable artistic belt, and the kind of critical appreciation that only comes when a proven auteur once again establishes his creative credentials."

In 2015, the film was included in The Guardian's top 50 films of the decade so far.

=== Awards ===
The film won the Grand Prize at the Sydney Film Festival.

== See also ==
- Only God Forgives (soundtrack)
- My Life Directed by Nicolas Winding Refn, a documentary about the film's production and release
