= Seasons Change (film) =

- Thai theatrical poster
- Directed by: Nithiwat Tharathorn
- Written by: Nithiwat Tharathorn
- Produced by: Jira Maligool; Chenchonnanee Soonthonsaratul; Suwimol Techasupinan; Youngyooth Thongkonthun; Prasert Vivattanananpong
- Starring: Witawat Singlampong; Yuwanat Arayanimisakul; Chutima Teepanat
- Cinematography: Prapapope Duangpikool
- Edited by: Prapapope Duangpikool
- Music by: Boonrut Sirirattanapan
- Production company: 365 Films
- Distributed by: GMM Tai Hub (GTH); BBTV production
- Release date: 23 August 2006
- Running time: 108 minutes
- Country: Thailand
- Language: Thai

Seasons Change (Thai: เพราะอากาศเปลี่ยนแปลงบ่อย, or Phror arkad plian plang boi) is 2006 Thai romantic comedy film directed by Nithiwat Tharathorn.

== Plot ==
The story takes place at the College of Music, Mahidol University over one year and covers the three seasons that Bangkok typically experiences – summer, winter and monsoon. It chronicles the life of a young high school student, Pom, and his impulsive decision to attend a music school, unknown to his parents, because of a girl he has secretly liked for three years, Dao. At the music school, he befriends Aom, who eventually becomes his best friend at the academy.

As a talented rock drummer he aids a wise Japanese instructor, Jitaro, in research. He also forms a rock band with two friends, Ched and Chat. However, in order to become closer to the talented violinist Dao, he joins the orchestra and is assigned by the feisty conductor, Rosie, to play timpani.

Eventually, as time schedule collides, he is forced to choose between playing in a rock band or the orchestra, and is also forced to choose between his crush on Dao, or his best friend, Aom.

== Cast ==
- Witawat Singlampong as Pom
- Chutima Teepanat as Aom
- Yuwanat Arayanimisakul as Dao
- Panissara Phimpru as Rosie
- Yano Kazuki as Jitaro
- Ratchu Surachalas as Ched
- Chalermpol Tuntawisut as Chat

== Reception ==
This movie was generally well-received by its target audience, and it quickly became a favorite among Thai adolescents for its lovable characters whom many found easy to relate to. The soundtrack was also popular among teenage movie-goers as it borrowed from a hit single by pop singer-songwriter Boyd Kosiyabong.

Film critic Sorradithep Supachanya wrote: "The story is clearly cliché and the title hopelessly unoriginal (it shares the title with one of the most popular, and overplayed, Thai songs in the country’s pop music history); yet, with the director’s brilliant mix of picturesque landscapes, beautiful music, and plenty of harmless humour, Seasons Change turns out fresh, sweet, and heartwarmingly enjoyable".

== DVD release ==
In 2006 the film was released in Thailand as a VCD and a two-disc special edition DVD. In addition to the original movie, the first disc of the DVD edition contains a host of special features, including a photo gallery, deleted scenes, director commentary and music videos. The second disc features an interview with the director and the leading roles of the movie. This is presented in a multi-angle format as the audience is able to switch between camera angles during the interview. During the entire interview, the cast comments on each individual scene. The audio soundtrack and subtitles are only in Thai; no English-language features are available.
