= Nithiwat Tharathorn =

Thai film director

- นิธิวัฒน์ ธราธร
- Occupation: Film director

Nithiwat Tharathorn (Thai: นิธิวัฒน์ ธราธร) is a Thai film director. He made his directorial debut alongside five other directors on the 2003 childhood romantic comedy Fan Chan (2003), and his solo debut with the romantic comedy Seasons Change in 2006. In 2014, he released the romantic drama film Teacher's Diary.

== Selected filmography ==
- Fan Chan (2003)
- Seasons Change (2006)
- Dear Galileo (2009)
- Teacher's Diary (2014)
- A Gift (segment: "Still on My Mind") (2016)
- Everybody Loves Me When I'm Dead (2025)
