= Chermarn Boonyasak =

Thai actress and model (born 1982)

- เฌอมาลย์ บุญยศักดิ์
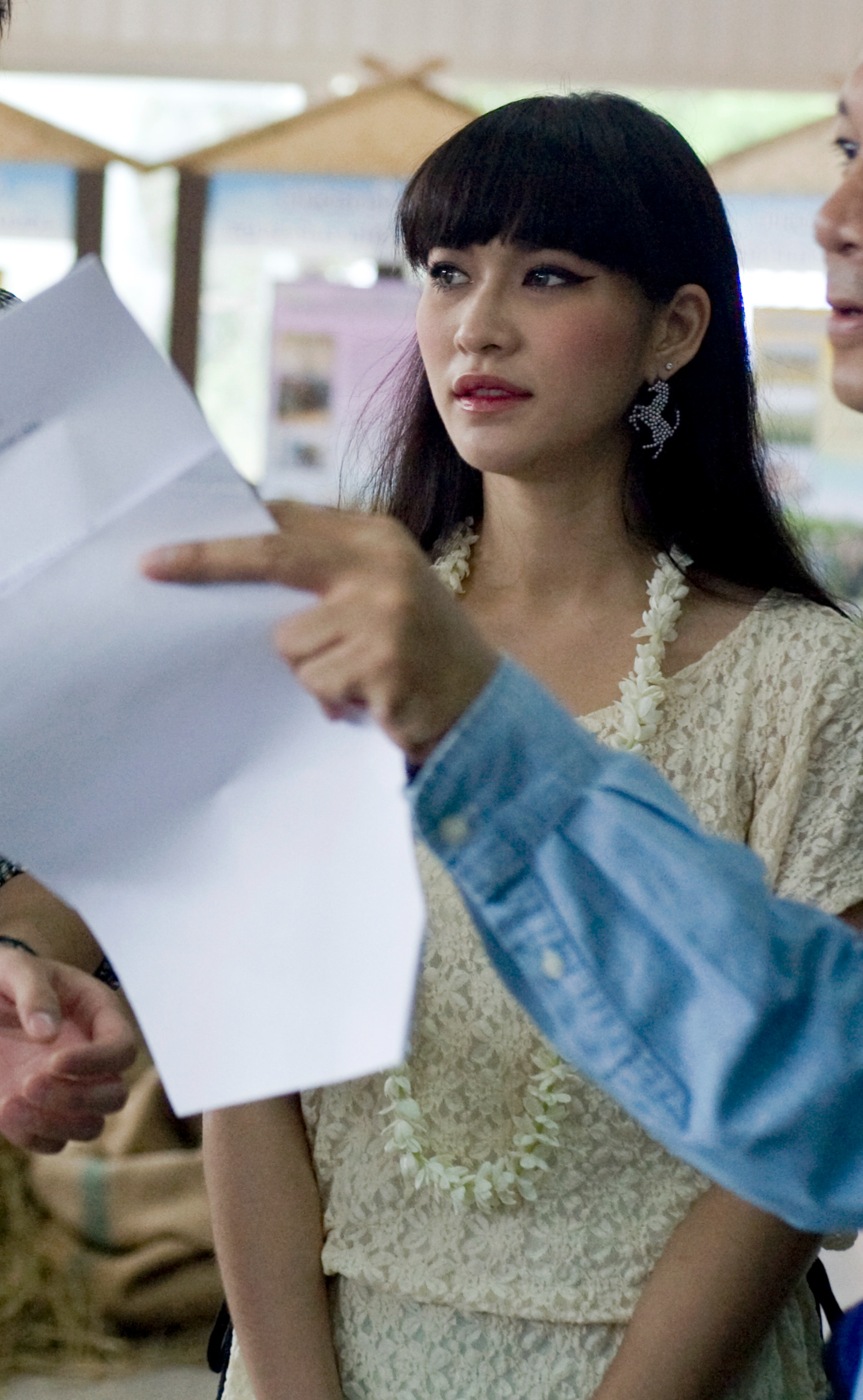
- Chermarn in 2009
- Born: Chermarn Boonyasak (Thai: เฌอมาลย์ บุญยศักดิ์); 15 September 1982 (age 43); Bangkok, Thailand
- Other name: Ploy
- Education: Lumnamping College (BBA); Assumption University
- Occupation: Actress
- Years active: 1993–present
- Agent: Channel 3 (2006–2017)
- Known for: Buppah Rahtree; The Love of Siam; Eternity; Rabum Duang Dao; Samee Tee Thra; The Face Thailand
- Relatives: Daran Boonyasak (sister)

Signature
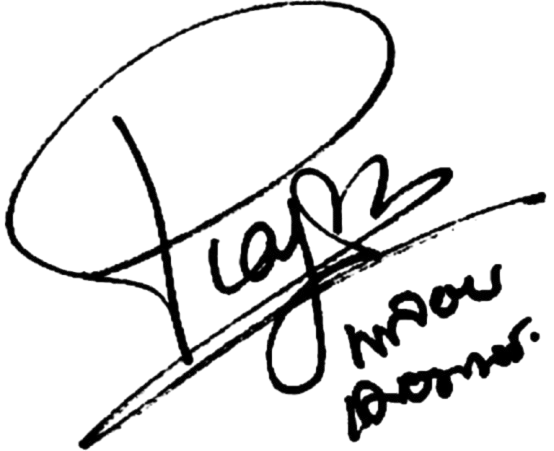

Laila Boonyasak (Thai: ไลลา บุญยศักดิ์, RTGS: Laila Bunyasak, born 15 September 1982), formerly Chermarn Boonyasak (Thai: เฌอมาลย์ บุญยศักดิ์, RTGS: Choeman Bunyasak), nicknamed Ploy (Thai: พลอย, RTGS: Phloi), is a Thai actress. She is well known for her role as June/Tang in the film The Love of Siam, which earned her a Suphannahong National Film Award for Best Supporting Actress and a Bangkok Critics Assembly Award for the same category. Her other film roles have included the title ghost character in director Yuthlert Sippapak's horror-comedies Buppah Rahtree and Buppah Rahtree Phase 2: Rahtree Returns. She was also featured in Pen-Ek Ratanaruang's Last Life in the Universe, in which she portrayed the younger sister of the character played by her real-life older sister, Daran Boonyasak.

== Early life ==
Chermarn Boonyasak was born on 15 September 1982 in Bangkok, Thailand. Her father is Sirisak Boonyasak, a rear admiral; her mother is Thanyada Nilphirom (formerly Jiraporn). Her parents divorced when she was young because her father wanted a son, she has an older sister who later became a former actress Daran Boonyasak. Her mother became a single mother and raised her two daughters, so Chermarn and her older sister were raised by their grandmother Yupin Kritsanarat.

Chermarn completed her primary education at St. Joseph Rayong School in Rayong province. She then attended Joan of Arc School in Bangkok for her lower secondary education and continued her upper secondary studies at Bodindecha (Sing Singhaseni) School. Chermarn graduated with a Bachelor of Business Administration from Lumnamping College and she also obtained a bachelor's degree in Communication Arts from Assumption University.

== Career ==
In 2014, Chermarn has joined forces with the UN Refugee Agency and celebrities around the world to help spread the message of World Refugee Day.

She's also a mentor on the modelling-themed reality series The Face Thailand season 1 and The Face Thai and season 4 All Stars, aired on Channel 3.

== Politics ==
Chermarn has supported the PDRC protests and Prayut Chan-o-cha, to the point where there are photos of them together. However, she later took a stand against Prayut's administration during the COVID-19 pandemic in Thailand and supported the protests in Thailand in 2020–2021.

== Filmography ==
Films
Year	Title	Role	Notes	With
1995	Suti Taek Sud Khaw Lok (สติแตกสุดขั้วโลก)		Guest	None
1996	Goodbye Summer (กู๊ดบายซัมเมอร์ เอ้อเหอเทอมเดียว)	Dao	Supporting Role	None
2000	Satang (สตางค์)	Rampha	Lead Role	Patson Sarintu
2003	O Lucky Man (แมนเกินร้อยแอ้มเกินพิกัด)	Mill	Lead Role	Sam Chotibund
2003	Last Life in the Universe (เรื่องรัก น้อย นิด มหาศาล)	Nid	Main Cast	None
2003	The Park (สวนสนุกผี)	Pinky	Supporting Role	Mathew Dean
2003	Buppah Rahtree (บุปผาราตรี)	Buppah Rahtree	Lead Role	Krit Sripoomseth
2004	Sai Lor Fah (สายล่อฟ้า)	Herself	Guest	None
2005	Buppah Rahtree Phase 2: Rahtree Returns	Buppah Rahtree	Lead Role	Krit Sripoomseth
2007	The Love of Siam (รักแห่งสยาม)	Tang/June	Supporting Role	None
2008	4bia (สี่แพร่ง)	Pim	Lead Role	None
2009	Buppha Reborn (บุปผาราตรี 3.1)	Buppah Rahtree	Lead Role	Mario Maurer
2009	Rahtree's Revenge (บุปผาราตรี 3.2)	Buppah Rahtree	Lead Role	Mario Maurer
2010	Eternity (ชั่วฟ้าดินสลาย)	Yupadee	Lead Role	Ananda Everingham
2011	30+ (Single On Sale) (30+ โสดออนเซล)	Ink	Lead Role	Arak Amornsupasiri
2011	The Outrage (อุโมงค์ผาเมือง)	Warlord's Wife	Main Cast	Ananda Everingham
2014	The Teacher's Diary (คิดถึงวิทยา)	Ann	Lead Role	Sukrit Wisetkaew
2016	Buppah Arigato (บุปผาอาริกาโตะ)	Buppah	Guest	None
2018	Samui Song (ไม่มีสมุยสำหรับเธอ)	Wiyada	Lead Role	David Asavanond
2018	Homestay (โฮมสเตย์)	the Guardian (nurse)	Supporting Role	None
2024	Pattaya Heat (ปิดเมืองล่า)	G (a tarot fortune teller)	Main Role	Ananda Everingham, Jirayu Thantrakul & Noi Pru

=== Television series ===
Dramas
Year	Title	English Title	Role	Network	Notes	With
1993	Dong Poo Dee ดงผู้ดี		Pojanee	Channel 3	Guest	None
1995	HgaoRahu เงาราหู		sbaithong (as a kid)	Channel 3	Supporting Role	None
1996	Fak fa tha lae fan ฟากฟ้าทะเลฝัน		Intirar	Channel 3	Main Cast	Yuthapichye Charnlekha
2000	Nang Sao Po Ra Dok นางสาวโพระดก		Phoradk	Channel 7	Lead Role	Nuti Khemayotin
2001	Na Tang Barn Raek หน้าต่างบานแรก	First Window	Hnung	ITV	Lead Role	Nantasai Pisaliboon
2001	Wang Waree วังวารี		Kulya	Channel 3	Main Cast	None
2002	Nam Pu น้ำพุ	Fountain	Kik	Channel 7	Main Cast	Tawan Jarujinda
2002	Yai Sanaeha ใยเสน่หา		Ginnie	Channel 3	Main Cast	None
2002	Kn Rerng Mueung คนเริงเมือง		Marlini	Channel 5	Main Cast	None
2002	Roy Leh Saneh Rai ร้อยเล่ห์เสน่ห์ร้าย		Tunfa	Channel 5	Main Cast	None
2003	look sauw mae xey ลูกสาวแม่เอ๊ย	Mother's daughter	bai tong	Channel 3	Lead Role	Thitinan Suwansak
2004	Gum Kub Ruk Gum Rub Hua Jai กำกับรัก กำกับหัวใจ		Kaew	ITV	Lead Role	Johnny Anfone
2005	Nai Fun ในฝัน	In Dreams	Princess	MCOT	Lead Role	Ananda Everingham
2006	Amaraetalai อมฤตาลัย		Pentowadee/Yosowtoria	Channel 3	Main Cast	none
2007	Ruk Leh Saneh Luang รักเล่ห์เสน่ห์ลวง	Tricky Love	Jauring "Ja"	Channel 3	Lead Role	Tridsadee Sahawong
2007	Meuh Dok Rak Ban เมื่อดอกรักบาน		Clea	Channel 3	Main Cast	Chatayodom Hiranyatithi
2008	Nimit Marn นิมิตมาร		Pakwan	Channel 3	Main Cast	Witaya Wasukraipaisarn
2008	Botan Kleep Sudtai โบตั๋นกลีบสุดท้าย	Last Peony Petal	Panan "Ah Nan"	Channel 3	Main Cast	Kiatkamol Lata
2009	Poo Yai Lee Gub Nang Ma ผู้ใหญ่ลีกับนางมา	Headless Lee and Miss Ma	Ma	Channel 3	Lead Role	Tridsadee Sahawong
2009	Namtan Mai น้ำตาลไหม้	Burnt Sugar	Nian	Channel 3	Main Cast	None
2010	Kularb Rai Nam กุหลาบไร้หนาม	Rose Without Thorns	Nantawadee "Wadee"	Channel 3	Main Cast	Warit Tipgomut
2010	Rabum Duang Dao ระบำดวงดาว	Dance of the Stars	Namwan	Channel 3	Main Cast	Thana Suthikamorn
2011	Ruk Mai Mee Wun Tay รักไม่มีวันตาย	Love Never Dies	Plaichat "Plai"	Channel 3	Main Cast	Pakorn Lum
2011	Pim Mala พิมมาลา	The Secret Garland Garden	Pim Mala	Channel 3	Main Cast	Atichart Chumnanon
2012	Khun Seuk ขุนศึก	Khun Seima the Warrior of Ayodhaya	Rei Rai	Channel 3	Main Cast	Atichart Chumnanon
2012	Ruk Khun Tao Fah รักคุณเท่าฟ้า	Love You as Much as the Sky	Pim	Channel 3	Main Cast	Theeradeth Wonpuapan
2013	Buang Barp บ่วงบาป		Ram Pueng	Channel 3	Main Cast	
2013	Madam Dun มาดามดัน	Madam Dun	Madam Pucci	Channel 3	Main Cast	Mario Maurer
2014	Samee Tee Thra สามีตีตรา	The Marked Husband	Karat "Kang"	Channel 3	Main Cast	Thanavat Vatthanaputi
2016	Sai Lub Ruk Puan สายลับรักป่วน		Arun	Channel 3	Main Cast	Andrew Gregson
2017	Kvarm Ruk Krung Sud Tai ความรักครั้งสุดท้าย	Last Love	Rose	GMM 25	Main Cast	Jirayu La-ongmanee & Thana Suthikamorn
2018	Love Bipolar Fin Na ka Ruk Na Krub; Love Bipolar เลิฟนะคะ รักนะครับ	Love Bipolar	Wreni	GMM 25	Main Cast	Toni Rakkaen
2018	Club Friday The Series 10 รักนอกใจ ตอน รักร้าย	Club Friday The Series	Kan	GMM 25	Main Cast	Puttichai Kasetsin
2019	Sleepless Society: Nyctophobia ตอน แพ้กลางคืน	Sleepless Society: Nyctophobia	Meena	One 31, Netflix	Main Cast	Nattapat Nimjirawat
2019	Raeng Tian แรงเทียน	Candlepower	Tiansee	GMM 25	Main Cast	Wongsakorn Poramathakorn
2020	Plerng Nang เพลิงนาง	Her Desire	Fahprang	Amarin TV	Main Cast	Peter Corp Dyrendal, Sarut Vichitrananda, Intad Leowrakwong, Pongnirun Kantajinda
2021	Reya เรยา	My name is Reya	Reya Wongsawet / Fah	CH8	Main Cast	Wongsakorn Poramathakorn, Sittha Sapanuchart

=== TV program ===
Year	Title	Role	Network
2014	The Face Thailand (season 1)	herself/ as mentor	Channel 3, Thailand
2018	Drag Race Thailand	herself/ as guest judge	Line TV, Thailand
2018	The Face Thai and season 4 All Stars	herself/ as mentor	Channel 3, Thailand

== TVC/Presenter ==
TVC/Presenter
Year	Company	Product/TVC Name	With
1995	Ban	Ban for men	
2009	Laurier		
2010	Tipco	Super Fruit Essence	
2010	Tipco	Tipco Veggie	
2010	Tipco	Tipco Orange Field	Nawat Kulrattanarak
2010	L'Oreal	White Perfect Double Essence	
2010	Clear	Clear Shampoo	Nawin Yaowapholkul
2011	Clear	Clear Women	
2011	Rexona	Rexona Dry Spray	
2011	Tipco	Tipco Orange Juice	Prin Suparat
2012	Clear	Clear "Perfect Check"	
2012	Clear	Clear Ice Cool	Kejar Topi
2012	Samsung	Sumsung Eco Bubble	
2012	Trident	Trident Recaldent	
2012	Laurier	Laurier Soft & Safe Night	
2012	Laurier	Laurier Soft & Safe Extra Protection	
2012	L'Oreal	White Perfect Laser	
2012	Rexona	Rexona Dry Spray	
2012	The Capital Ekamai	Thonglor condominium	
2012	Colgate	Colgate Optic White	
2012	Chevrolet	Chevrolet Cruze	Metavarayuth Teeradetch
2013	Mistine	Mistine Maxi Black	
2013	Ready	Ready Drink	
2013	Laurier	Laurier Soft & Safe	
2013	Scotch Collagen	Scotch Collagen Aora	
2013	Trident	Trident Layers	
2013	Dutchie	Dutchie Bio	
2014	12Plus	12Plus Shower Cream	
2014	L'Oreal	L'Oreal White Perfect Treatment Water	
2014	Samsung	Samsung S5	
2014	Scotch Collagen	Scotch Collagen Aora	
2014	Hicee	Hicee Vitamin C	
2014	Dutchie	Dutchie Bio 7 Fruit	
2014	Romrawin Clinic	"I am beauty"	
2014	Mistine	Mistine 3D Browse Secret	
2014	Mistine	Mistine Wings	
2015	Cathy Doll	Cathy Doll Splash Essence	
2015	Snail White	Snail White Sunscreen	
2015	Hygiene	Hygiene expert care	
2015	Mistine	Mistine Cosmo	
2015	Mistine	Mistine Super Model	
2015	Purra	Purra Mineral Water	
2015	TaoKaeNoi	TaoKaeNoi Seaweed	
2016	Mistine	Mistine see through	
2016	Purra	Purra Mineral Water	
2017	HuaWei	HuaWei P10	
2017	Mistine	Mistine The Peak	
2017	Scotch Collagen	Scotch Collagen Aora	
2017	Purra	Purra Mineral Water "Feeling 30s"	

== Awards and nominations ==
Year	Award	Category	Nominated work	Result
1996	5th Suphannahong National Film Awards	Best Supporting Actress	Goodbye Summer	Nominated
2002	22nd Mekhala Awards	Outstanding Supporting Actress	Roy Leh Sanae Rai	Nominated
2007	17th Suphannahong National Film Awards	Best Supporting Actress	The Love of Siam	Won
2007	16th Bangkok Critics Assembly Awards	Best Supporting Actress	The Love of Siam	Won
2007	5th Starpics Thai Film Awards	Best Supporting Actress	The Love of Siam	Nominated
2007	6th Star Entertainment Awards	Best Actress in a Supporting Role	The Love of Siam	Won
2008	Top Awards	Best Actress	Botan Kleep Sudtai	Nominated
2008	6th Starpics Thai Film Awards	Best Supporting Actress	4bia	Nominated
2009	Top Awards	Best Actress	Namtan Mai	Nominated
2009	Ch3's News Entertainment Awards (See San Awards)	Most Popular Actress	Poo Yai Lee Gub Nang Ma	Won
2009	7th Komchadluek Awards	Best Supporting Actress in TV Drama	Namtan Mai	Nominated
2009	Ok! Magazine Awards	Male Heartthrob	—N/a	Won
2010	Top Awards	Best Actress in a Film	Chua Fah Din Salai	Won
2010	Top Awards	Best Actress in a Lakorn	Rabum Duang Dao	Nominated
2010	Top Awards	Best Supporting Actress in a Lakorn	Kulap Rai Narm	Nominated
2010	Young & Smart Vote 2010	Most Popular Actress	—N/a	Won
2010	20th Suphannahong National Film Awards	Best Actress	Chua Fah Din Salai	Nominated
2010	8th Komchadluek Awards	Best Actress in a Lakorn	Rabum Duang Dao	Won
2010	8th Komchadluek Awards	Best Actress in a Lakorn	Kulap Rai Narm	Nominated
2010	8th Komchadluek Awards	Best Actress in a Film	Chua Fah Din Salai	Won
2010	8th Starpics Thai Film Awards	Best Actress	Chua Fah Din Salai	Nominated
2010	19th Bangkok Critics Assembly Awards	Best Actress	Chua Fah Din Salai	Won
2010	Ch3's News Entertainment Awards (See San Awards)	Best leading actress of the year	"Rabum Duang Dao & Kularb Rai Narm"	Won
2010	Siamdara Star Awards	Best Actress	Chua Fah Din Salai	Nominated
2010	Siamdara Star Awards	Best Actress	Rabam Duang Dao	Nominated
2010	Siamdara Star Awards	Sexy Star	—N/a	Nominated
2010	25th TV Gold Awards	Best Leading Actress	Rabam Duang Dao	Won
2010	2nd Nataraj Awards	Best Actress	Rabam Duang Dao	Won
2011	Mthai Top Talk-About 2011	Top Talk-About Actress 2011	Chua Fah Din Salai	Won
2011	4th Nine Entertain Awards	Actress of the Year	Chua Fah Din Salai /Rabum Duang Dao / Kulap Rai Narm	Won
2011	Seventeen Choice Awards	Seventeen Choice Actress	—N/a	Won
2011	Praew Magazine	Superstar Icon	—N/a	Won
2012	Top Awards	Best Actress in a Lakorn	Khun Seuk	Nominated
2012	1st Kerd Awards	Kerd Ma Hot	—N/a	Nominated
2012	The Journey of 1st Anniversary	No.1 Hot Female Superstar Of The Year" Number1 Award	—N/a	Won
2012	Praew Magazine	Superstar Icon	—N/a	Won
2012	Teen choice Awards	Seventeen Choice Actor & Actress	—N/a	Won
2012	Royal Academy of Praise Awards	Outstanding Thai Language Usage	Khun Seuk	Won
2013	2nd Kerd Awards	Kerd Ma Hot	—N/a	Won
2013	Praew Magazine	Superstar Icon	—N/a	Won
2013	11th Komchadluek Awards	Best Actress	Buang Barp	Nominated
2013	11th Komchadluek Awards	Most Popular Actress	Buang Barp	Nominated
2014	Thailand International Film Destination Festival 2014	Thailand People Awards For International Film	Teacher's Diary	Won
2014	23rd Bangkok Critics Assembly Awards	Best Actress	Teacher's Diary	Nominated
2014	30th Saraswati Royal Awards (Golden Doll Awards)	Best Actress	Teacher's Diary	Nominated
2014	29th TV Gold Awards	Best Leading Actress	Samee Tee Tra	Nominated
2014	2nd Goddess of lightning Star Awards	Hot Actress of The Year	Samee Tee Tra	Won
2014	2014 Siamdara Star Awards	Best Actress in a lakorn	Samee Tee Tra	Nominated
2014	2014 Siamdara Star Awards	Popular Leading Actress	Samee Tee Tra	Won
2014	2014 Siamdara Star Awards	Best Actress in film	Teacher's Diary	Nominated
2014	Thailand Zocial Awards 2014	Top Woman Celebrity of the Year	—N/a	Won
2015	Great Awards	Best Actress in a Film	Teacher's Diary	Nominated
2015	Great Awards	Hot girl of the year	—N/a	Nominated
2015	24th Suphannahong National Film Awards	Best Actress	Teacher's Diary	Nominated
2015	Zen Stylish Awards	Stylish	—N/a	Won
2015	12th Komchadluek Awards	Best Leading Actress in TV series	Samee Tee Tra	Nominated
2015	12th Komchadluek Awards	Most Popular Actress	Samee Tee Tra	Nominated
2015	12th Komchadluek Awards	Best Leading Actress in Film	Teacher's Diary	Nominated
2015	6th Nataraj Awards	Best Actress	Samee Tee Tra	Nominated
2015	Zen Stylish Awards	Stylish	—N/a	Won
2016	OK! Magazine awards	Female Hot Stuff	—N/a	Won
2016	Kazz Awards	Super Star Award	—N/a	Nominated
2017	Best Biz & Products Awards 2017	Outstanding Business and Product of the Year	—N/a	Won
2018	BK Film Awards 2018	Best Leading Actress	Samui Song	Won
2018	15th Komchadluek Awards	Best Leading Actress	Samui Song	Nominated
2018	16th Starpics Thai Film Awards	Best Leading Actress	Samui Song	Nominated
2019	9th Thai Film Director Awards	Best Leading Actress	Samui Song	Nominated
2019	28th Suphannahong National Film Awards	Best Leading Actress	Samui Song	Nominated
2019	27th Bangkok Critics Assembly Awards	Best Leading Actress	Samui Song	Nominated
