= Daran Boonyasak =

Thai actress

- ดารัณ บุญยศักดิ์
- Born: Sinitta Boonyasak (Thai: สินิทธา บุญยศักดิ์); June 5, 1979 (age 46); Bangkok, Thailand
- Other name: Noon (นุ่น)
- Education: Communication Arts Srinakharinwirot University
- Occupations: Actress; model
- Years active: 1994–2014
- Known for: Last Life in the Universe; A Moment in June
- Relatives: Chermarn Boonyasak (sister)

Daran Boonyasak (Thai: ดารัณ บุญยศักดิ์; RTGS: Daran Bunyasak), formerly Sinitta Boonyasak (Thai: สินิทธา บุญยศักดิ์; RTGS: Sinittha Bunyasak), and nicknamed Noon (born June 5, 1979) is a Thai actress. She is the older sister of Chermarn Boonyasak and is best known for her role as Noi in Last Life in the Universe (2003).

== Filmography ==
- 2003: Last Life in the Universe - Noi
- 2006: Bite of Love - Bee (Mother)
- 2008: Wings of Blue Angel - Nuam
- 2008: A Moment in June - Bride
- 2009: Cupid's Love Ring - Oranee (Television)
- 2010: Eternal Flame - Nari (Television)
- 2011: Kohn Teun - Pada (Television)

== Biography ==
She was first widely known in 1994 for playing the role of Fah, a nice lovely young woman in TV commercials for Mistine. This commercial is well known because it is the first TV commercial in Thailand to be presented as a series, and also the official launch of Mistine, Thai cosmetic brand.

Sinitta's younger sister Laila is very famous in Thailand for her film work and modeling career. Around 2001 Sinitta decided to take an acting/directing course at Srinakharinwirot University, Prasarnmit Campus in Bangkok. It was there that she learned how to act without over-acting, like she had been doing in her previous 20-odd soap opera roles. She spent some time as a television host and was taking a Thai cooking class when she was approached by Pen-Ek Ratanaruang for the role of Noi in Last Life in the Universe, a role which kept her from quitting the film business altogether.

== Awards and nominations ==
Year	Award	Category	Nominated work	Result
2004	13th Suphannahong National Film Awards	Best Leading Actress	Last Life in the Universe	Nominated
2004	12th Bangkok Critics Assembly Awards	Best Actress	Last Life in the Universe	Won
2004	1st Starpics Thai Film Awards	Best Actress	Last Life in the Universe	Won
2005	11th Chlotrudis Awards	Best Actress	Last Life in the Universe	Nominated
