= Vithaya Pansringarm =

Thai actor (born 1959)

- วิทยา ปานศรีงาม
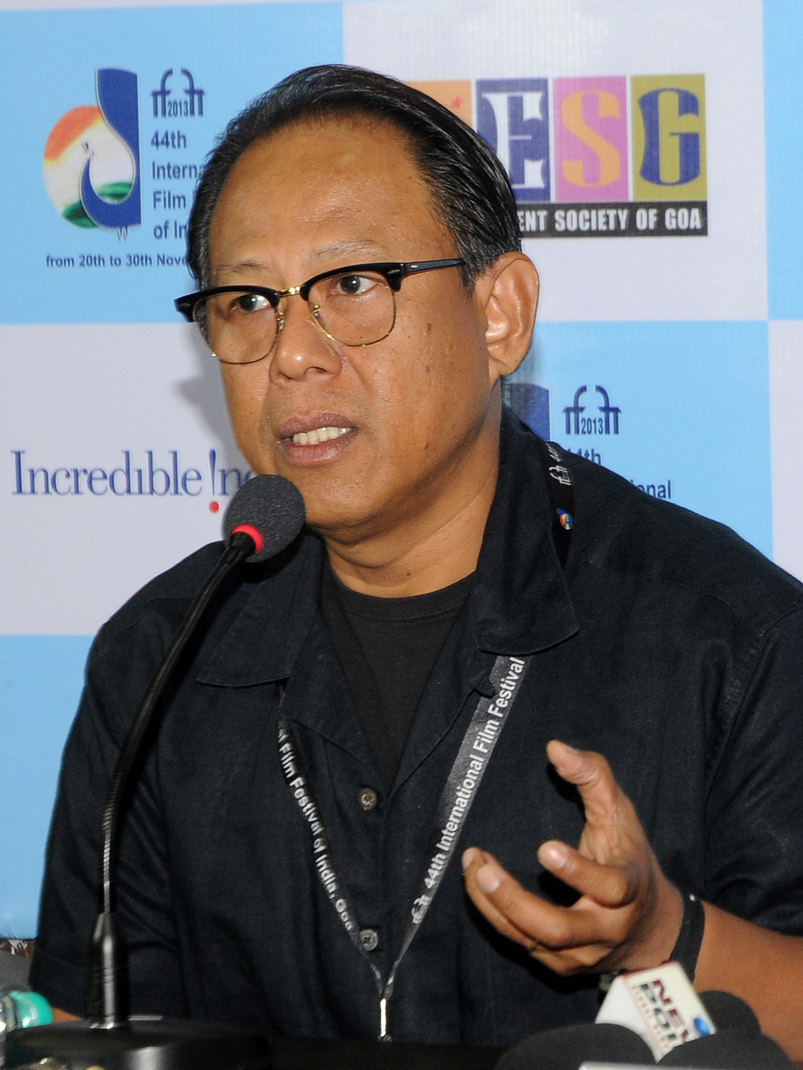
- Vithaya Pansringarm at IFFI 2013
- Born: 11 August 1959 (age 67); Bangkok, Thailand
- Other name: Pu Vithaya
- Education: New York Institute of Technology
- Occupation: Actor
- Years active: 2010–present
- Known for: Only God Forgives

Vithaya Pansringarm (Thai: วิทยา ปานศรีงาม, RTGS: witthaya pansi-ngam; born 11 August 1959) is a Thai actor best known for appearing in Only God Forgives. He is also known in Thailand as "Khun Pu".

Vithaya graduated in Graphic Design from New York Institute of Technology. He has practiced martial arts for more than thirty years and holds a 5th degree black belt (5 dan) in the Japanese martial art kendo and is president of the Thailand Kendo Club.

== Career ==
In June 2014, he won Best Actor at the Shanghai International Film Festival for his role as Chavoret in The Last Executioner, a film based on the true life story of Thailand's last person to carry out executions by gun. The film also won 'Best Picture' and 'Best Screen Play' at the 30th Surasawadi Awards in 2015.

== Personal life ==
Pansringarm is married to Fay Stombler Pansringarm, an American ballerina, who he has met in 1984 while living in New York. In 1987, the couple has moved to Bangkok, Thailand, where they have founded Rising Star Dance Studio in 1996.

== Filmography ==
Film
Year	Title	Role	Notes
2010	The Prince and Me: The Elephant Adventure	King Saryu	Video
2011	The Burma Conspiracy	Colonel Komsan	
2011	Mindfulness and Murder	Father Ananda	He also wrote the screenplay
2011	The Hangover Part II	Minister	
2012	Trade of Innocents	Nath	
2013	Choice	Cop	
2013	Only God Forgives	Lieutenant Chang / "The Angel of Vengeance"	
2013	Gutted	The Priest	Short film
2013	The Mark: Redemption	Bldg Owner	
2013	Ninja: Shadow of a Tear	General Sung	
2013	The White Storm	Mr. Choowit	
2014	The Last Executioner	Chavoret Jaruboon	Won Best Actor at the 2014 Shanghai International Film Festival
2014	Klinik unter Planen	Dian	TV movie
2014	Glory Days	Chang	
2014	Lupin the 3rd	Commander Narong	
2015	River	The Bartender	
2016	Mechanic: Resurrection	Prison Warden	
2016	Operation Mekong	P'Som	
2017	Paradox	Commissioner Chai	
2017	Samui Song		
2017	Haphazard	Akutagawa	
2017	A Prayer Before Dawn	Officer Preecha	
2018	The Meg	Thai Boat Captain	
2018	Trafficker	Tran	
2018	Attrition	Wai's Father	"The Prey"
2019	Paradise Beach	Sirimongkon	
2020	Sergio	President Abdurrahman Wahid	
2020	Motel Acacia	Sami	
2022	Thirteen Lives	General Anupong Paochinda	
2022	The Lake	Suwat	Thai monster film
2023	Mayhem!	Hansa	
2023	4 Kings II	Mr. Nipon	
2024	Don't Come Home	Vichai	
2024	Pushpa 2: The Rule	Don Hiroshi	Telugu film
2025	They Call Him OG	Ojas Sensei	Telugu film
