= Last Life in the Universe =

2003 Thai film

- Film poster
- Directed by: Pen-Ek Ratanaruang
- Written by: Pen-Ek Ratanaruang; Prabda Yoon
- Produced by: Wouter Barendrecht; Duangkamol Limcharoen; Nonzee Nimibutr
- Starring: Tadanobu Asano; Sinitta Boonyasak; Laila Boonyasak
- Cinematography: Christopher Doyle
- Edited by: Patamanadda Yukol
- Music by: Hualampong Riddim; Small Room
- Production companies: Bohemian Films; Cinemasia
- Distributed by: Five Star Production; Fortissimo Films
- Release date: 8 August 2003
- Running time: 112 minutes
- Countries: Thailand; Japan; Netherlands
- Languages: Thai; Japanese; English

Last Life in the Universe (Thai: เรื่องรัก น้อยนิด มหาศาล, romanized: Ruang rak noi nid mahasan) is a 2003 Thai romantic crime film directed by Pen-Ek Ratanaruang. The film is notable for being trilingual; the two main characters flit from Thai to Japanese to English as their vocabulary requires. The film stars Japanese actor Tadanobu Asano and Sinitta Boonyasak.

== Plot ==
Kenji is a lonely librarian in the Japan Foundation in Bangkok. Living in an apartment full of precise stacks of books, his half-hearted attempts to kill himself are continually interrupted by the people around him. Kenji's most notable obstacle is his self-absorbed brother, Yukio, a yakuza, or Japanese gangster. Yukio fled from Japan to escape the wrath of his employer, with whose daughter he had had sex. Yukio's friend Takashi suggests that if it were his daughter, he would have the despoiler killed, but Kenji's brother laughs this warning off. Yukio frequents a club where he can enjoy the attention of a bunny-eared hostess, a local girl named Nid. Nid's sister, Noi, is furious at her sibling for having slept with her boyfriend, Jon.

One day in the library, Kenji spies on Nid, clad in a school girl's uniform. Soon after, he discovers that his brother has hidden a pistol inside a teddy bear. He is about to shoot himself when Yukio is slain by Takashi, who was apparently hired by Yukio's employer. (During the library scene where Kenji first encounters Nid, a hanging poster for the Takashi Miike film Ichi the Killer is clearly featured. Tadanobu Asano was also the star of that film.)

Takashi sees Kenji, who appears hopeful at his impending death, but suddenly Kenji shoots and kills the assassin. Not long after that, Kenji is about to jump off a bridge when Noi and Nid, driving past, have an argument. Noi throws Nid out of the car, then reconsiders. Nid, distracted by Kenji sitting on the railing of the bridge, is struck by another car and dies.

Kenji and Noi, both having lost a sibling, form a tentative friendship. The introspective Kenji asks the extroverted Noi if he can stay with her, unwilling to spend time with the two corpses in his apartment. Noi agrees, and invites the fussy Japanese man into her disastrously unkempt beachside home. As Kenji begins cleaning, Noi prepares to leave for Japan to further her career. Surreal elements creep into the film; Noi sees the house magically cleaning itself, while Kenji watches Noi transform into her temptress sister. The couple, in some ways polar opposites and in some ways mirror images, form a semi-romantic relationship. Meanwhile, the abusive and promiscuous ex-boyfriend Jon begins calling, angry that Noi thinks she can leave him. Three yakuza are also dispatched to find out what has happened to Takashi.

In the final segments, Kenji drives Noi to the airport, then decides he will join her. He returns to his apartment to gather his things and purposely knocks over a stack of books. While he is in the bathroom, first Jon, then the yakuza arrive. Jon is slain, and Kenji apparently escapes out the window. The movie then cuts back and forth between two scenes: one, in which Kenji has been arrested for some unspecified crime, and another in which he is re-united with Noi in Japan. The relationship between or canonicity of these two scenes is not made clear by the movie - particularly whether the reuniting scene is imagined or not.

Throughout the movie, images of the furtive gecko who lives in Noi's house, as well as The Last Lizard are shown, Kenji's children's book about a reptile who wakes up to discover he is the final member of his species. The fictional lizard realizes that even being with his enemies, the other lizards who picked on him, was preferable to being alone.

== Awards ==
Last Life in the Universe was awarded in Thailand two times by the Thailand National Film Association Awards and the FIPRESCI Prize (Bangkok International Film Festival). For his role as Kenji, Tadanobu Asano received the Upstream Prize for Best Actor at the 2003 Venice Film Festival. The film received the AQCC Award and Jury Prize at the Fant-Asia Film Festival. It was also chosen to be Thailand's official submission for the Academy Award for Best Foreign Language Film in 2003.

The soundtrack music played at the end of the movie called "Gravity", performed by the Thai diva Dharini Divari, became a hit.

== Cast ==
- Tadanobu Asano as Kenji
- Sinitta Boonyasak as Noi, Nid's older sister
- Laila Boonyasak as Nid, Noi's youger sister
- Yutaka Matsushige as Yukio
- Riki Takeuchi as Takashi
- Thiti Rhumorn as Jon
- Yoji Tanaka as yakuza
- Sakichi Sato as yakuza
- Takashi Miike as yakuza

== See also ==
- List of submissions to the 76th Academy Awards for Best Foreign Language Film
- List of Thai submissions for the Academy Award for Best Foreign Language Film
