= List of animated television series of 2006 =

A list of animated television series first aired in 2006.

Animated television series first aired in 2006
Title	Seasons	Episodes	Country	Year	Original Channel	Technique
4 Angies	3	76	Thailand	2006–09	Channel 3	CGI
The Adventures of Chico and Guapo	1	5	United States	2006	MTV2	Flash
Akbar & Birbal	1	13	India	2006	Cartoon Network	
Alejo & Valentina (2006)	6	76	Argentina	2006–present	MTV Latin America (seasons 1-4); Flixxo (season 5-present)	Flash
The Amazing Adrenalini Brothers	1	26	United Kingdom; Canada	2006–07	CITV; Cartoon Network; YTV	Flash
Apple Candy Girl	1	39	South Korea	2006–07	KBS1	Traditional
Assy McGee	2	20	United States	2006–08	Adult Swim	Flash
Avez-vous déjà vu ..?	1	150	France	2006	M6	Flash
Bali	3	26	France; Canada	2006–08	France 5	Traditional
The Bee-Bees	1	52	Italy	2006	Rai Due	Tradiitonal
Bernard	6	60	France, South Korea, Spain	2006–20	EBS	CGI
Bigfoot Presents: Meteor and the Mighty Monster Trucks	1	26	Canada, United States	2006–08	Discovery Kids	CGI
Biker Mice from Mars	1	28	United States	2006–07	4Kids TV	Traditional
Black & White		24	United States, Israel	2006	BabyFirstTV	Flash
Block!	2	30	Chile	2006–07	TVN	
Boblins	1	78	United Kingdom	2006–08	CITV	CGI
Bola Kampung	6	78	Malaysia	2006–10	RTM 1	
Boonie Bear		43	United States, Israel	2006	BabyFirstTV	Flash
Captain Flamingo	3	52	Canada, Philippines	2006–08	YTV; GMA Network	Flash
Century Sonny	2	52	China	2006	CCTV	CGI
Chaotic	3	79	United States; Canada (season 1)	2006–10	4Kids TV, The CW4Kids, Teletoon	Flash (season 1); Traditional (seasons 2–3)
El Chavo: The Animated Series	7	135	Mexico	2006–14	Canal 5	Traditional/Flash
City Hunters	1	9	Argentina	2006	Fox	
Class of 3000	2	28	United States	2006–08	Cartoon Network	Flash
Clic & Kat	1	52	Italy	2006	Rai Due	Flash
Crap Rap	2		Ireland	2006	RTÉ Two	Flash
Ctrl+Alt+Del: The Animated Series	2	24	Canada	2006–09	YouTube; Ctrl+Alt+Del.com	Flash
Curious George	15	198	United States	2006–22	PBS Kids, Family Jr., Peacock	Traditional (Season 1–11), Flash (Season 12-15)
Curucuru and Friends	3	65	South Korea, China	2006–16	KBS1	Stop motion
Deadly	1	13	Australia	2006	Nine Network	Flash
Di-Gata Defenders	2	52	Canada	2006–08	Teletoon	Traditional
Dibo the Gift Dragon	2	52	South Korea	2006–12	EBS	CGI
Dogstar	2	52	Australia	2006–11	Nine Network	Flash
Dougie in Disguise	1	104	Spain	2006	Clan	Flash
Dr. Dog	1	52	France; Germany	2006	KI.KA	Traditional
Dragon Hunters	2	52	France, Germany, Italy (season 2)	2006–07	France 3, Canal J, Teletoon, Cartoon Network	Traditional
Dudson's Modern Tales	1	25	Canada	2006	Bite	CGI
Edebits	1	26	Spain	2006	Clan	Flash/Traditional
Ednooki	9		North Macedonia	2006	A1, Kanal 5, Sitel, Alfa TV	Flash
Eloise: The Animated Series	1	13	United States; United Kingdom	2006	Starz Kids & Family	Flash
The Emperor's New School	2	52	United States	2006–08	Disney Channel	Traditional
Eon Kid	1	26	South Korea; Spain	2006	KBS2; TVE2; Clan; RTVE	CGI
Erky Perky	3	39	Australia; Canada	2006–09	Seven Network; YTV	CGI
Fantastic Four: World's Greatest Heroes	1	26	France, United States	2006–10	Cartoon Network	Traditional
Feeling Good with JoJo	2	20	Canada, United States	2006–08	Playhouse Disney	Stop motion
Fetch! with Ruff Ruffman	5	100	United States	2006–10	PBS Kids Go!	Flash/Live action
First Baby Songs		170	Israel	2006–present	BabyTV	CGI/Flash/Stop motion
Forest Friends	1	52	France	2006–07	TF1	Traditional
Four Eyes!	2	24	United States; France; Ireland	2006	Nicktoons Network; France 3 TG4	Traditional
Freak Show	1	7	United States	2006	Comedy Central	Flash
Fred & Fiona		45	United States, Israel	2006	BabyFirstTV	Flash
Freej		70	United Arab Emirates	2006–13	Dubai TV, Sama Dubai	CGI
Frisky Dingo	2	25	United States	2006–08	Adult Swim	Flash
Galactik Football	3	78	France	2006–11	France 2	Traditional/CGI
Gino il Pollo perso nella rete	1	52	Italy	2006	Rai Tre	Flash
Grossology	2	52	Canada	2006–09	YTV	Flash
Growing Up Creepie	1	26	United States; Canada; Germany; Ireland; South Korea; Singapore	2006–08	Discovery Kids	Flash
Hala's Advice	3	56	United Arab Emirates	2006–08	Al Resalah TV	Flash
Handy Manny	3	113	United States; Canada	2006–13	Playhouse Disney (2006–11); Disney Junior (2011–13)	CGI
Happy Tree Friends (2006)	1	13	United States; Canada	2006	G4; Razer	Flash
Hide & Seek		42	United States, Israel	2006	BabyFirstTV	Flash
Hiệp sĩ Trán Dô	1	4	Vietnam	2006	VTV3	
Holly Hobbie & Friends	1	8	United States	2006–09	Nickelodeon	Traditional
Horrid Henry	5	250	United Kingdom; Canada (series 1)	2006–20	CITV (series 1–4); Netflix (series 5)	Traditional (series 1–4); Flash (series 5)
Horseland	3	39	United States	2006–08	CBS	Traditional
I Got a Rocket!	1	26	Australia; United States; Germany; South Korea; Singapore	2006–07	KI.KA; Nickelodeon; Network Ten; Kabillion; KBS	Flash
I'm an Animal	1	52	Ireland	2006		Flash
IMP	1	65	Spain; United Kingdom	2006–07	Channel 4	CGI
Kaleidoscope		39	United States	2006	BabyFirstTV	Flash
Kappa Mikey	2	52	United States	2006–08	Nicktoons Network	Flash
Kidz Bop Comic Adventures	1	11	United States	2006	Disney Channel	Flash
Kungya Kungya	1	26	South Korea	2006–07	KBS2	Traditional
Lenny & Twiek	1	26	Germany	2006	KI.KA	Traditional
Laban the Little Ghost		24	Sweden	2006		
The Last of the Mohicans	1	26	Italy	2006	Rai Due	Traditional
Legion of Super Heroes	2	26	United States	2006–08	Kids' WB	Traditional
El Libro de Sofía	5		Colombia	2006–16	Telecaribe	Flash
The Likeaballs	1	26	United Kingdom	2006	BBC One, CBBC	Traditional
Little Princess	4	130	United Kingdom	2006–20	Channel 5	Flash
Lola & Virginia	1	26	Basque Country, Spain	2006–07	France 3, TV3, Disney Channel	Flash
Loopdidoo	5	260	France	2006–16	France 5	CGI
Lou and Lou: Safety Patrol	1	21	United States	2006	Playhouse Disney	Flash
Louie	3	117	France	2006–08	France 5	Flash
Lullabies		21	United States	2006	BabyFirstTV	Flash
Lunar Jim	2	46	Canada	2006–07	CBC Television	Stop motion
Luntik	10	579	Russia	2006–present	Carousel; Russia-1; Russia-K; Mult	Flash (season 1–2); CGI (season 3–present)
The Many Adventures of Mr. Mailman	1	26	United States	2006–10	PBS Kids Sprout	Flash/Live action
Magic Cellar	1	13	South Africa, Canada	2006–07	SABC 2	CGI
La Máquina de Chuíto	1	38	Venezuela	2006	ViVe	Flash/CGI/Live action
McDull and Chinese Culture	1	5	Hong Kong	2006	RTHK	Traditional
Metalocalypse	4	61	United States	2006–13	Adult Swim	Flash
Mickey Mouse Clubhouse	4	125	United States	2006–16	Playhouse Disney; Disney Junior	CGI
Minoriteam	1	19	United States	2006	Adult Swim	Flash
Minuscule	2	175	France	2006–15	France 2	CGI/Live action
Mobiles		26	United States, Israel	2006	BabyFirstTV	Flash
Modern Toss	2	12	United Kingdom	2006–08	Channel 4	Flash
Munchies			United States	2006	Fuse	Flash/Live action
My Pop Up Book		38	United States, Israel	2006	BabyFirstTV	Flash
My Goldfish Is Evil!	2	26	Canada	2006–07	CBC Television	Traditional
Nalong 2	1	52	South Korea	2006–07	MBC	Traditional
The Naughty Naughty Pets	1	26	Canada	2006	CBC Television	Flash
Numberjacks	2	67	United Kingdom	2006–09	CBeebies; BBC Two	CGI/Live action
The Numbers Farm		32	United States, China	2006	BabyFirstTV	Flash
Odd Family	1	26	France; South Korea	2006	TF1	CGI
El Ojo del Gato	1	12	Chile	2006	Canal 13	CGI
On s'écoute parler			Canada	2006	TVA	
Origami Warriors	1	52	South Korea	2006–07	SBS	Traditional
The Owl	1	52	France; Germany	2006–07	France 3	CGI
Ozie Boo!	3		France	2006	France 5 Tiji	CGI
PangPond the Himmapan Adventure	1	8	Thailand	2006	Channel 3	CGI
El Pequeño Héroe y El Tesoro de la Luz	2	30	Uruguay	2006–07	Canal 4	Traditional
Petey Paintbrush		28	United States	2006	BabyFirstTV	Flash
Pib and Pog		5	United Kingdom	2006	BBC	Stop motion
Pinky Dinky Doo	2	52	United States; Canada (season 2); Latin America	2006–10	Noggin; CBC Television (season 1); TVOntario (season 2); Discovery Kids; CBeebies	Flash (season 1); CGI (season 2); Live action
Pitch and Potch	1	19	Israel	2006–07	BabyTV	Flash
Poncho Balón	1	31	Mexico	2006	Canal 5	Flash
Potlach	1	26	France, Italy	2006	France 3	CGI
Profesor Súper O	4	96	Colombia	2006–present	Canal 13, Señal Colombia	Traditional
Pucca	3	65	Canada (2006–08); South Korea (2018–19)	2006–19	Toon Disney (2006–08); MBC TV (2018–19); Family Channel (2006–08)	Flash (seasons 1–2); CGI (season 3)
Purple and Brown	1	18	United Kingdom	2006–07	Nickelodeon	Stop motion
Puzzles	2	70	United States, Israel, China	2006–18	BabyFirstTV	Flash (2006); CGI (2018)
Raggs	2	65	Australia, United States	2006–09	Network Ten, PBS Kids	CGI/Live-action
Rainbow Horse		60	United States, Israel	2006	BabyFirstTV	Flash
Rat-Man	1	52	Italy	2006–07	Rai Due	Traditional
Raven Tales	2	26	Canada	2006	APTN	CGI
Ready, Dress, Go!		32	United States, Israel	2006	BabyFirstTV	Flash
The Replacements	2	52	United States	2006–09	Disney Channel	Traditional
Rintindumb	1	75	France	2006–07	France 3	Traditional
Ruby Gloom	2	40	Canada	2006–08	YTV	Flash
Rudi & Trudi	1	26	Germany; United Kingdom	2006–07	KI.KA	Traditional
Rupert Bear, Follow the Magic...	4	52	United Kingdom	2006–08	Five	Stop motion
SantApprentice	2	50	France	2006	France 5	Traditional
School for Vampires	4	104	Italy; Germany	2006–10	KI.KA; ARD	Traditional
The Secret Show	2	52	United Kingdom	2006–07	CBBC	Flash
The Secret World of Og	1	9	Canada	2006	CBC Television	Flash
Shaabiat Al Cartoon	18	360	United Arab Emirates	2006–24	Sama Dubai	Flash (seasons 1–7, 13–18); CGI (seasons 8–12)
Shadow Stories		20	United States	2006	BabyFirstTV	
Shaggy & Scooby-Doo Get a Clue!	2	26	United States	2006–08	Kids' WB	Traditional
Shaolin Wuzang	1	26	China, France	2006	France 3	Traditional
Shapes and Sizes		53	United States	2006	BabyFirstTV	Flash
Sherm!	1	28	Germany	2006	Super RTL	Traditional
Shorty McShorts' Shorts	2	13	United States	2006–07	Disney Channel	Flash
Shuriken School	1	26	Spain; France	2006–07	France 3 Jetix	Flash
Skatoony	3	39	Canada, United Kingdom	2006	Teletoon, Cartoon Network	Flash/Live action
SKWOD	2	20	United States	2006–07	AOL Kids; CBS	Flash
Sparkle Friends	5	33	New Zealand	2006–11	TVNZ 2	Flash
Spirou et Fantasio	2	39	Belgium, France	2006–09	M6	Traditional
Sprookjesboom	4	156	Netherlands	2006–09		CGI
Squirrel Boy	2	26	United States	2006–07	Cartoon Network	Traditional
Staines Down Drains	1	26	Australia, New Zealand	2006–07	Seven Network	Flash
The Storytelling Show	2	90	France	2006	M6	Flash
Team Galaxy	2	52	France; Canada	2006–08	France 3 Rai 2 YTV	Traditional
Tell Me a Story		27	United States	2006	BabyFirstTV	Flash
Ti'Tom: Les Aventures Outre-Mer	1	13	France	2006	France Ô	Traditional
Tigga & Togga	2	52	Canada	2006	TVOntario	Flash
Tillie Knock Knock		34	United States, Israel	2006	BabyFirstTV	Flash
Tom and Jerry Tales	2	26	United States	2006–08	Kids' WB	Traditional
Tori Go! Go!	1	17	South Korea	2006	KBS2	Traditional
Tortoise Hanba's Stories		52	China	2006–08	CCTV	CGI
The Ugly Duckling and Me!	1	26	Denmark, France, Germany	2006		CGI
Underground Ernie	1	26	United Kingdom	2006	CBeebies	CGI
URBO: The Adventures of Pax Afrika	2	104	South Africa	2006–09	SABC 3	Flash/CGI
VeggieTales on TV!	3	26	United States	2006–09	NBC; Qubo	CGI
Viva Piñata	2	52	Canada; United States	2006–09	YTV; Fox (2006–07); 4Kids TV (2008)	CGI
W	3	156	Canada	2006	Teletoon	Traditional
Wanderings of Sanmao	1	26	China	2006	CCTV	Traditional
Weird Years	1	26	Canada	2006–07	YTV	Flash
What It's Like Being Alone	1	13	Canada	2006	CBC Television	Stop motion
What's Different?		27	United States	2006	BabyFirstTV	Flash
Where My Dogs At?	1	8	United States	2006	MTV2	Flash
Widget and His Wonder Machine		35	United States	2006	BabyFirstTV	Flash
Wiesenspektakel	1	15	Germany	2006	KI.KA	
Wilbur	1	26	Canada	2006–08	CBC Television, Discovery Kids, TLC	Flash/Live action
Włatcy móch	9	127	Poland	2006–11	TV4	Flash
Wonder Box		57	United States, Israel	2006	BabyFirstTV	Flash
Wonder Pets!	3	62	United States	2006–13	Nickelodeon; Nick Jr. Channel	Flash
Wow! Wow! Wubbzy!	2	52	United States	2006–10	Nickelodeon	Flash
Wunderkind Little Amadeus	2	26	Germany	2006	KI.KA	Traditional
Yam Roll	1	39	Canada	2006	CBC Television	Flash
Yin Yang Yo!	2	65	United States	2006–09	Toon Disney (2006–09); Disney XD (2009)	Flash
The Yoyo and Peanut Show		26	United States, Israel	2006	BabyFirstTV	Flash
Z-Squad	1	26	Canada, South Korea	2006–07	SBS	CGI
Zorro: Generation Z	1	26	United Kingdom	2006	Pop	Traditional

Anime television series first aired in 2006
Title	Episodes	Country	Year	Original Channel	Technique
.hack//Roots	26	Japan	2006	TV Tokyo	Traditional
009-1	12	Japan	2006		Traditional
Ah! My Goddess: Flights of Fancy	22	Japan	2006	TBS	Traditional
Air Gear	25	Japan	2006		Traditional
Akubi Girl	26	Japan	2006		Traditional
Amaenaide yo!! Katsu!!	12	Japan	2006		Traditional
Aria the Natural	26	Japan	2006		Traditional
Ayakashi: Samurai Horror Tales	11	Japan	2006		Traditional
BakéGyamon	51	Japan	2006–07		Traditional
Ballad of a Shinigami	6	Japan	2006		Traditional
Bartender	11	Japan	2006		Traditional
Binbō Shimai Monogatari	10	Japan	2006		Traditional
Binchō-tan	12	Japan	2006		Traditional
Black Blood Brothers	12	Japan	2006		Traditional
Black Jack 21	17	Japan	2006		Traditional
Black Lagoon	12	Japan	2006	Chiba TV	Traditional
Black Lagoon: The Second Barrage	12	Japan	2006	OX	Traditional
Buso Renkin	26	Japan	2006–07	TV Tokyo	Traditional
Le Chevalier D'Eon	24	Japan	2006–07		Traditional
Chibinacs	25	Japan	2006		
Chocotto Sister	24	Japan	2006		Traditional
Code Geass: Lelouch of the Rebellion	25	Japan	2006–07	MBS	Traditional
La Corda d'Oro: Primo Passo	25	Japan	2006–07		Traditional
Coyote Ragtime Show	12	Japan	2006		Traditional
Crash B-Daman	50	Japan	2006	TV Tokyo	Traditional
D.Gray-man	103	Japan	2006–08		Traditional
Death Note	37	Japan	2006–07		Traditional
Demonbane	12	Japan	2006		Traditional
Digimon Data Squad	48	Japan	2006–07	Fuji TV	Traditional
Eagle Talon	11	Japan	2006		Flash
Ergo Proxy	23	Japan	2006		Traditional
The Familiar of Zero	13	Japan	2006		Traditional
Fate/stay night	24	Japan	2006		Traditional
Fist of the Blue Sky	26	Japan	2006–07		Traditional
Flag	13	Japan	2006–07		Traditional
Funny Pets	24	Japan	2006		CGI
Futari wa Pretty Cure Splash Star	49	Japan	2006–07	TV Asahi	Traditional
Gag Manga Biyori 2	12	Japan	2006		Traditional
Gakuen Heaven	13	Japan	2006		Traditional
Galaxy Angel Rune	13	Japan	2006		Traditional
The Galaxy Railways II: Crossroads to Eternity	24	Japan	2006–07		Traditional
Gargoyle of Yoshinaga House	13	Japan	2006		Traditional
Ghost Hunt	25	Japan	2006–07		Traditional
Ghost Slayers Ayashi	25	Japan	2006–07		Traditional
Gift: Eternal Rainbow	12	Japan	2006		Traditional
Gin'iro no Olynssis	12	Japan	2006		Traditional
Gintama	201	Japan	2006–10		Traditional
Glass Fleet	26	Japan	2006		Traditional
The Good Witch of the West	13	Japan	2006		Traditional
Hanbun no Tsuki ga Noboru Sora	6	Japan	2006		Traditional
Hanoka	12	Japan	2006		Flash
Happiness!	12	Japan	2006	Chiba TV	Traditional
Happy Lucky Bikkuriman	46	Japan	2006–07		Traditional
Hataraki Man	11	Japan	2006		Traditional
Hell Girl: Two Mirrors	26	Japan	2006–07		Traditional
High School Girls	12	Japan	2006		Traditional
Higurashi When They Cry	26	Japan	2006		Traditional
Himawari!	13	Japan	2006		Traditional
Hime-sama Goyōjin	12	Japan	2006		Traditional
Honey and Clover II	12	Japan	2006		Traditional
Humanoid Monster Bem (2006)	26	Japan	2006		Traditional
Innocent Venus	12	Japan	2006		Traditional
Inukami!	26	Japan	2006		Traditional
Jyu-Oh-Sei	11	Japan	2006		Traditional
Kage Kara Mamoru!	12	Japan	2006		Traditional
Kagihime Monogatari Eikyū Alice Rondo	13	Japan	2006		Traditional
Kamisama Kazoku	13	Japan	2006		Traditional
Kanon	24	Japan	2006–07	TBS	Traditional
Kashimashi: Girl Meets Girl	12	Japan	2006	TV Tokyo	Traditional
Kekkaishi	52	Japan	2006–08		Traditional
Kemonozume	13	Japan	2006		Traditional
Kenichi: The Mightiest Disciple	50	Japan	2006–07	TV Tokyo	Traditional
Kiba	51	Japan	2006–07		Traditional
Kirarin Revolution	102	Japan	2006–08	TV Tokyo	Traditional
Koi suru Tenshi Angelique: Kokoro no Mezameru Toki	13	Japan	2006		Traditional
Kujibiki Unbalance	12	Japan	2006		Traditional
Lemon Angel Project	13	Japan	2006		Traditional
Living for the Day After Tomorrow	12	Japan	2006		Traditional
Love Get Chu	25	Japan	2006		Traditional
Lovely Idol	12	Japan	2006		Traditional
Magikano	13	Japan	2006		Traditional
Makai Senki Disgaea	12	Japan	2006		Traditional
Mamoru-kun ni Megami no Shukufuku o!	24	Japan	2006–07		Traditional
Mamotte! Lollipop	13	Japan	2006	TV Setouchi	Traditional
Marginal Prince	13	Japan	2006		Traditional
Mega Man Star Force	55	Japan	2006–07	TV Tokyo	Traditional
MegaMan NT Warrior Beast+	26	Japan	2006		Traditional
Meine Liebe ~Wieder~	13	Japan	2006		Traditional
The Melancholy of Haruhi Suzumiya	14	Japan	2006	Chiba TV	Traditional
Musashi Gundoh	26	Japan	2006		Traditional
Muteki Kanban Musume	12	Japan	2006		Traditional
Nana	47	Japan	2006–07		Traditional
Negima!?	26	Japan	2006–07		Traditional
Neko Rahmen	13	Japan	2006–07		Flash
Nerima Daikon Brothers	12	Japan	2006	TV Tokyo	Traditional
Night Head Genesis	24	Japan	2006		Traditional
Ōban Star-Racers	26	Japan, France	2006		Traditional
Ocha-ken: Hotto Monogatari	13	Japan	2006		
Onegai My Melody ~Kuru Kuru Shuffle~	52	Japan	2006–07	TV Osaka	Traditional
Otogi-Jūshi Akazukin	39	Japan	2006–07		Traditional
Otome wa Boku ni Koishiteru	12	Japan	2006		Traditional
Ouran High School Host Club	26	Japan	2006	Nippon TV	Traditional
Papillon Rose	6	Japan	2006		Traditional
Patta Potta Monta	26	Japan	2006–07		Traditional
Powerpuff Girls Z	52	Japan	2006–07	TV Tokyo	Traditional
Princess Princess	12	Japan	2006		Traditional
Project Blue Earth SOS	6	Japan	2006		Traditional
Pumpkin Scissors	24	Japan	2006–07		Traditional
Pururun! Shizuku-chan	51	Japan	2006–07		Traditional
Rakugo Tennyo Oyui	12	Japan	2006		Traditional
Ray the Animation	13	Japan	2006		Traditional
Reborn!	203	Japan	2006–10	TV Tokyo	Traditional
Rec	9	Japan	2006		Traditional
Red Garden	22	Japan	2006–07		Traditional
Renkin 3-kyū Magical? Pokān	12	Japan	2006		Traditional
Ring ni Kakero 1: Nichibei Kessen Hen	12	Japan	2006		Traditional
Rozen Maiden: Ouvertüre	2	Japan	2006		Traditional
Saru Get You -On Air-	26	Japan	2006	TV Tokyo	CGI
Saru Get You -On Air- 2nd	51	Japan	2006–07	TV Tokyo	CGI
Sasami: Magical Girls Club	26	Japan	2006–07	WOWOW	Traditional
School Rumble: 2nd Semester	26	Japan	2006	TV Tokyo	Traditional
Shinseiki: Duel Masters Flash	24	Japan	2006–07	TV Tokyo	Traditional
Shōnen Onmyōji	26	Japan	2006–07	Kansai TV	Traditional
Simoun	26	Japan	2006		Traditional
Soul Link	12	Japan	2006		Traditional
Spider Riders	52	Japan, Canada	2006–07	TV Tokyo	Traditional
A Spirit of the Sun	2	Japan	2006		Traditional
The Story of Saiunkoku	39	Japan	2006–07	NHK	Traditional
Strain: Strategic Armored Infantry	13	Japan	2006–07	WOWOW	Traditional
Strawberry Panic!	26	Japan	2006	TVK	Traditional
Sumomomo, Momomo	22	Japan	2006–07	TV Asahi	Traditional
Super Robot Wars Original Generation: Divine Wars	25	Japan	2006–07		Traditional
Tactical Roar	13	Japan	2006		Traditional
Tama and Friends: Search For It! The Magic Puni-Puni Stone	26	Japan	2006		Traditional
The Third: The Girl With the Blue Eye	24	Japan	2006		Traditional
Tokimeki Memorial Only Love	25	Japan	2006–07	TV Tokyo	Traditional
Tokko	13	Japan	2006		Traditional
Tokyo Tribe 2	13	Japan	2006–07		Traditional
Tona-Gura!	13	Japan	2006		Traditional
Tottoko Hamtaro Hai!	77	Japan	2006–08		
Tsuyokiss	12	Japan	2006		Traditional
Twin Princess of Wonder Planet Gyu!	52	Japan	2006–07	TV Tokyo	Traditional
Ultimate Muscle II	13	Japan	2006	TV Tokyo	Traditional
Usavich	78	Japan	2006–15	MTV Japan	CGI
Utawarerumono	26	Japan	2006		Traditional
The Wallflower	25	Japan	2006–07	TV Tokyo	Traditional
Wan Wan Celeb Soreyuke! Tetsunoshin	51	Japan	2006		Traditional
We Were There	26	Japan	2006		Traditional
Welcome to the N.H.K.	24	Japan	2006	Chiba TV	Traditional
Winter Garden	2	Japan	2006	TBS	Traditional
Witchblade	24	Japan	2006		Traditional
xxxHolic	24	Japan	2006	TBS	Traditional
Yoake Mae yori Ruriiro na	12	Japan	2006		Traditional
Yomigaeru Sora – Rescue Wings	13	Japan	2006	TV Tokyo	Traditional
Yoshimune	24	Japan	2006		Traditional
Yu-Gi-Oh! Capsule Monsters	12	Japan, United States	2006	4Kids TV	Traditional
Yume Tsukai	12	Japan	2006		Traditional
Zegapain	26	Japan	2006		Traditional
Zenmai Zamurai	215	Japan	2006–09	NHK E	

== See also ==
- List of animated feature films of 2006
- List of Japanese animation television series of 2006
