= List of Sasami: Magical Girls Club episodes =

Sasami: Magical Girls Club, produced by AIC and BeSTACK, is a magical girl anime television series using characters from the Tenchi Muyo! franchise in new roles. The series follows Sasami Iwakura who is recruited to a school club of magical girls. It is officially recognized as a Tenchi Muyo! spin-off. The series comprises two seasons with a total of 26 episodes. Season 1 aired on WOWOW on Thursday nights from April 13, 2006, to July 13, 2006, and season 2 aired from October 5, 2006, to January 11, 2007. Both seasons were licensed for a release in the United States by Funimation Entertainment. On January 12, 2009, the series made its North American debut on the FUNimation Channel.

== Episode list ==
No.	Title	Original release date
1	"Sasami and Misao"; Transliteration: "Sasami to Misao" (Japanese: 砂沙美と美紗緒)	April 13, 2006
Misao and Sasami pursue a weird rabbit-like creature, leading to a friendship, changing their destinies. The Magical Girls club begins.
2	"Wishing on a Star"; Transliteration: "Hoshi ni negai wo..." (Japanese: 星に願いを…)	April 20, 2006
Misao and Sasami learn about their heritage, with a new person joining them in the Magical Girls Club: Makato. However, she learns the hard way to be careful about her decisions.
3	"First Time in First"; Transliteration: "Hajimete no ichiban" (Japanese: はじめての一番)	April 27, 2006
A marathon is held at the school to celebrate the long-awaited return of Tsukasa, a popular student, to the campus. When she vanishes not long afterward, Sasami travels to the house of Tsukasa to find out the reason for her disappearance.
4	"The Dreaded An-An Notebook"; Transliteration: "Kyoufu no ANAN techou" (Japanese: 恐怖のアンアン手帳)	May 11, 2006
Anri realizes that anything she writes in the magic notebook she has, appears in real life. However, since she has only been writing colorful insults as of late, these hang overtop Sasami and her friends.
5	"Out of the Tunnel"; Transliteration: "TONERU nuketara" (Japanese: トンネルぬけたら)	May 18, 2006
Sasami realizes she needs permission from a parent so she can go on a field trip to the World of the Witches, but her father refuses to give permission. She hopes that he will change his mind before the train leaves the station.
6	"Starlit Sky Dance"; Transliteration: "Hoshizora DANSU" (Japanese: 星空ダンス)	May 25, 2006
The adventure in the World of Witches continues, with Sasami meeting a boy named Amitav who seems to know about her. The loneliness of Misao fades away when she meets other lonely girls in this world!
7	"Night Sky Letter"; Transliteration: "Yozora no tegami" (Japanese: 夜空の手紙)	June 1, 2006
After Sasami thinks about Amitav after completing a school assignment, she and Misao travel to the World of the Witches again. However, a friend has to save them when they get lost.
8	"Ring of Friendship"; Transliteration: "Nakayoshi no yubiwa" (Japanese: なかよしの指輪)	June 8, 2006
Miso, while at the Niko-Niko Bazaar, she realizes she is working with Kozue and Chiaki. While it is a good way to know the friends of Sasami, Misao keeps messing up again and again!
9	"Good-bye, Miss Washu"; Transliteration: "Sayonara, Washu-sensei" (Japanese: さよなら鷲羽先生)	June 15, 2006
The job of Ms. Washu is challenged after Mr. Tonobe does an investigation of the Cooking Club. Sasami and the girls come to the rescue, hoping to save her with their culinary skills.
10	"Magical Girl Apprentice"; Transliteration: "Mahou shōjo no teiji" (Japanese: 魔法少女の弟子)	June 22, 2006
While Asami wants to be an apprentice for the Magical Girls Club, and when Sasami and the other members of the group learn why, they attempt to reunite Asami with her deceased parents.
11	"Everyone Together"; Transliteration: "Minna issho" (Japanese: みんな一緒)	June 29, 2006
Sasami and her friends are invited to be part of the Magical Girls Tournament. Their excitement for this wanes and fades when the grueling sessions ordered by Ms. Washu test their friendship.
12	"Magical Girl Tournament: The Noisy Part"; Transliteration: "Mahou shōjo taikai. Zawazawa-hen" (Japanese: 魔法少女大会・ざわざわ編)	July 6, 2006
Misao becomes torn between her loyalty to the Magical Girls Club and Monta, with her emotional issues possibly causing her friends to be unable to attend the Magical Girls Tournament!
13	"Magical Girl Tournament: The Glittery Part"; Transliteration: "Mahou shōjo taikai. Kirakira-hen" (Japanese: 魔法少女大会・きらきら編)	July 13, 2006
While the team of Sasami is behind, they have one event remaining, struggling to cover, with magic, the bare branches of a tree with blossoms of happiness and love, the father of Sasami gives Ms. Washu news which startles her.
14	"The Chosen Girls"; Transliteration: "Erabareshi shōjo-tachi" (Japanese: 選ばれし少女達)	October 5, 2006
Having impressed the judges at the Magical Girl Tournament, the Magical Girls Club is invited to a special Magical Girls summer camp in the World of the Witches.
15	"The Witch's Cauldron"; Transliteration: "Majo no daikama" (Japanese: 魔女の大釜)	October 12, 2006
Sasami feels weird about some the skills the Magical Girls are learning at the camp, as does Ms. Washu, who sees the potential to either right past wrongs or do the opposite.
16	"My First Love"; Transliteration: "Hatsukoi no hito" (Japanese: 初恋の人)	October 19, 2006
The storytellers have a short window of time to protect the Magical Girls from the power of the Great Cauldron, especially when the Chief Sorceress is requesting that Sasami and her friends reach into the deepest, darkest parts of their souls.
17	"At the End of Summer"; Transliteration: "Natsu no owari ni" (Japanese: 夏のおわりに)	October 26, 2006
When Ms. Washu bans the Magical Girls from going back to the World of the Witches, Misao becomes upset. Little do they know, but the World of Witches will come to them in a way they cannot expect.
18	"Repeated Thoughts"; Transliteration: "Omoi wo kasanete" (Japanese: 想いを重ねて)	November 2, 2006
Itoki is out for Washu, and when the Magical Girls join the skirmish, Misao and Sasami discover a new power, with some people they know taking notice of this development.
19	"The Invitation of the Witches"; Transliteration: "Majo no izanai" (Japanese: 魔女の誘い)	November 9, 2006
Misao tries to do something for Monta, but the reaction from him sends her down a path that leads to a place which is far removed from the Magical Girls Club itself.
20	"The Maiden of the Dawn"; Transliteration: "AKATSUKI no otome" (Japanese: アカツキの乙女)	November 16, 2006
Misao, after hiding in the World of Witches, gains a position of honor due to her growing magic skills, and even a new title.
21	"Reunion"; Transliteration: "Saikai, soshite" (Japanese: 再会、そして)	November 30, 2006
The friends of Misao venture into the Tower of Twilight to save her, but the question remains: who will save Misao's friends?
22	"The Dark Tainted Heart"; Transliteration: "Kokoro, yami ni somete" (Japanese: 心、闇にそめて)	December 7, 2006
The Chief Sorcess tells Misao to try to access the deepest parts of her soul. While this may not happen, a meeting with a person she is familiar with may give Misao all the negativity she needs.
23	"When the Dawn Breaks"; Transliteration: "Yoru ga aketara" (Japanese: 夜が明けたら)	December 14, 2006
The World of Witches' dark magic has changed the attitude and appearance of Misao, resulting in a dangerous rescue attempt by Sasami.
24	"The Blooming Flower of Smile"; Transliteration: "Hohoemi ni saku hana" (Japanese: ほほえみに咲く花)	December 21, 2006
While the Chief Sorcess wants some of Sasami's power, the Magical Girls understand that the magic of friendship itself can effectively battle evil. As such, they realize that they can trust each other and work as one, then humanity can be saved.
25	"The Warm Dream"; Transliteration: "Atatakana yume" (Japanese: あたたかな夢)	January 4, 2007
Even though normality seems that it is returning, Itoki tells them of a new magic trouble, with Ginji realizing that he can only stop this by hurting those closest to him.
26	"Amitav's Song"; Transliteration: "AMI-chan no uta" (Japanese: アミちゃんの歌)	January 11, 2007
The Magical Girls realize they must depend on one another to fight their foes from the World of the Witches, as they know that only true friendship between them can save the world from calamity.
