= List of Mega Man Star Force episodes (original series) =

This article covers all 55 episodes of the original Mega Man Star Force anime series, known in Japan as Ryūsei no Rockman (流星のロックマン, Ryūsei no Rokkuman; Shooting Star Rockman). The series premiered in Japan on October 7, 2006, and finished its run on October 27, 2007.

The English version premiered on Toonami Jetstream on July 23, 2007. On August 25, the series then premiered on Cartoon Network edited as a 2-hour faux-movie presentation composed of Japanese episodes 1 through 9 and heavily slimmed-down versions of episodes 12, 15, and 16. Currently, it is unknown when or if the series will air in normal episodic format on television, but subsequent episode airings online reveal that the unusual edits are exclusive to the television premiere.

The original Japanese episodes are roughly 10 minutes long, with the English version combining two episodes together to fill a single 30-minute time-slot. Although most of the plots in the Japanese version are already split between two 10-minute episodes, a few one-part and three-part plots disrupt what would otherwise be a seamless combination of episodes. Thus, many English-dubbed episodes begin with the conclusion of the previous episode and end with a cliffhanger. Either way, this is problematic, as the series ends on an odd number of episodes. In order to compensate, Viz has combined Japanese episode 25 with ten minutes of recycled footage from the previous 25 episodes. This footage acts as a recap of the story up to that point and is accompanied with narration by Geo Stelar.

The series loosely follows the events of the first Nintendo DS Mega Man Star Force video game. However, the storyline makes an obvious shift at Japanese episode 32 using many concepts not featured in the games, specifically, the FM-ians' quest to gather "minus energy" and their ability to transform into doppelgänger forms of the humans they once possessed. This implied that the series was in a state of filler plot-lines until the second video game was released.

The majority of the run was handled by three art directors, although near the end, two more art directors appeared. The art directors mostly worked independently of one another one individual episodes, although in a few instances shared episodes. They are:

- Masayuki Nomoto - Japanese episodes 1–2, 5–7, 10, 13–14, 19–21, 24–25, 28–29, 32–34, 36–37, 40–41, 44–45, 48–51
- Akira Takahashi - Japanese episodes 3–4, 8–9, 12, 15–17, 22, 30–31, 35, 42–43, 46–47
- Shingo Adachi - Japanese episodes 11, 18, 23, 26–27, 38–39, 43, 46–47, 52
- Sunao Chikaoka - Japanese episode 53
- Yasuo Shimizu - Japanese episodes 54–55

The episodes below are listed separately according to their Japanese broadcast. Once the English versions have aired, they are then combined into a single episode to correspond with the English version. Air dates for both online (through Toonami Jetstream) and on television (through Cartoon Network; if at all) will also be documented where applicable.

#	Japanese title	English title	Original air date	English air date
01	"Tōbōsha Warrock" (逃亡者ウォーロック, Tōbōsha Wōrokku; Fugitive Warrock)	"Omega-Xis: The Fugitive"	2006-10-07	2007-07-23 (TJ)
02	"First Contact" (ファーストコンタクト, Fāsuto Kontakuto)	"Omega-Xis: The Fugitive"	2006-10-14	2007-07-23 (TJ)
Geo is having a hard time adjusting to life after his father Kelvin vanished in a space station accident three months ago, and it does not help when a group of children from his class try to forcefully make him attend school again. However, Geo's life takes a startling turn when he witnesses a battle between two EM waves one night, one of which collides with him in a flashy beam of light.
03	"Denpa Virus" (電波ウイルス, Denpa Uirusu; "Electromagnetic Wave Virus")	"Electromagnetic Wave Change!"	2006-10-21	2007-07-30 (TJ)
04	"Denpa Henkan!" (電波変換!, Denpa Henkan!; Electromagnetic Wave Change!)	"Electromagnetic Wave Change!"	2006-10-28	2007-07-30 (TJ)
Geo meets Omega-Xis, an alien from the planet FM, who hides out from his enemies in Geo's Transer. One day, a group of EM viruses attack a monorail train with Luna aboard. In order to battle the EM viruses, Omega-Xis offers Geo his power, and merging, they transform into the EM Wave Human known as Mega Man. With his new powers, Geo defeats the virus invasion, rescues Luna, and makes a name for himself as a hero in Echo Ridge.
05	"Subaru, On Air!!" (スバル、オン·エア!!, Subaru, On Ea!!)	"Trouble Takes Wing"	2006-11-04	2007-08-06 (TJ)
06	"Cygnus no Chōsen!" (キグナスの挑戦!, Kigunasu no Chōsen!; Cygnus's Challenge!)	"Trouble Takes Wing"	2006-11-11	2007-08-06 (TJ)
While experimenting with his new powers as Mega Man, Geo eavesdrops on the AMAKEN Labs and witnesses Tom acting paranoid about his new invention. Following him to the mountains, he witnesses Tom using the Flying Jacket. When Geo tells Aaron of the invention, Tom assumes Aaron is trying to steal his invention, and thus merges with FM-ain Cygnus to attack the labs.
07	"Eisei Tsuiraku!" (衛星墜落!, Eisei Tsuiraku!; Satellite Crash!)	"Crowded Air Waves"	2006-11-18	2007-08-20 (TJ)
08	"Ox Shūrai!" (オックス襲来!, Okkusu Shūrai!; Ox Invasion!)	"Crowded Air Waves"	2006-11-25	2007-08-20 (TJ)
Mega Man battles with Cygnus Wing until he escapes to space where an abandoned satellite is on a crash course toward AMAKEN. Mega Man convinces Tom to give up this fight, but Cygnus still has control of his body, and they escape together. The next day, Omega-Xis convinces Geo to go to school, but after he goes off on his own out of boredom, he encounters Taurus and the two begin to battle. When Taurus becomes overpowered, he forces EM Wave Change with Bud to become Taurus Fire.
09	"Bōsō Ox Fire" (暴走オックス·ファイア, Bōsō Okkusu Faia; Rampaging Ox Fire)	"Two New Visitors"	2006-12-02	2007-08-27 (TJ)
10	"Harp Singer Kenzan" (ハープ·シンガー見参, Hāpu Shingā Kenzan; Meet Harp Singer)	"Two New Visitors"	2006-12-09	2007-08-27 (TJ)
Geo transforms into Mega Man to battle with Taurus Fire, but Taurus Fire takes Luna hostage. However, Luna is able to get through to Bud, weakening the EM Wave Fusion and allowing Mega Man to win the battle. Later, everyone is excited about seeing the famous pop singer Sonia Sky in concert, but she keeps canceling concerts due to illness. Meanwhile, Omega-Xis encounters Lyra, another FM-ian enemy, who seems to have already found a human to manipulate as Lyra Note. (On Toonami Jetstream's website and the DVD, this episode was listed as "Taurus Trouble and Lyra's Lullaby")
11	"Harp Note Suisan!" (ハープ·ノート推参!, Hāpu Nōto Suisan!; Harp Note's Surprise Debut!)	"The Song of Lyra Note"	2006-12-16	2007-09-04 (TJ)
12	"Virus Ningen Arawaru!?" (ウイルス人間現わる!?, Uirusu Ningen Arawaru!?; A Virus Human Appears!?)	"The Song of Lyra Note"	2006-12-23	2007-09-04 (TJ)
A mysterious melody fills the airwaves of Echo Ridge, causing everyone to fall asleep. Mega Man rushes to the source, an EM Wave Human named Lyra Note. The two battle, and Sonia snaps out of Lyra's control. Later, the two begin to argue, but Lyra agrees to stop controlling Sonia when she sleeps and to stop trying to take over the world. Then, Copper suspects Geo has a connection to Mega Man and follows him throughout the city. Meanwhile, an EM virus unintentionally merges with a disgruntled artist who then goes on a rampage in a museum. Copper locks Geo up in his squad car while he tries to take care of the attack himself.
13	"Ikuta-sensei no Kagaku Kyōshitsu" (育田先生の科学教室, Ikuta-sensei no Kagaku Kyōshitsu; Ikuta-sensei's Science Classroom)	"Science Friction"	2007-01-06	2007-09-17 (TJ)
14	"Libra Ikuta no Kiken na Kyōshitsu" (リブラ育田の危険な科学教室, Ribura Ikuta no Kiken na Kyōshitsu; Libra Ikuta's Dangerous Classroom)	"Science Friction"	2007-01-13	2007-09-17 (TJ)
Geo meets Mitch Shepard, a science teacher, and a classmate, Pat Sprigs. He attends one of Shepard's classes and becomes excited about making bottle rockets for the next session. However, that night, The FM-ian Libra appears and Mega Man injures him in battle. Libra escapes into Shepard's Transer and takes over his body, hiding until his injury heals. He then tries to live Shepard's life normally, but the suspicious activity attracts Geo's attention. The two end up battling when Libra transforms into Libra Scales, but because of his injury, he is easily defeated and Shepard is returned to normal.
15	"Warau Denpa Kūkan" (笑う電波空間, Warau Denpa Kūkan; Laughing Electromagnetic Wave Space)	"Laughter in EM Wave Space"	2007-01-20	2007-10-01 (TJ)
16	"Okoru Denpa Kūkan" (怒る電波空間, Okoru Denpa Kūkan; Enraging Electromagnetic Wave Space)	"Laughter in EM Wave Space"	2007-01-27	2007-10-01 (TJ)
Everyone in Echo Ridge is laughing uncontrollably, and Omega-Xis suspects the FM-ian Gemini. Soon after, Mega Man encounters Gemini Spark and learns that when Gemini fuses with a human, he separates into two very powerful entities. The audience learns that Pat is said human, and he continues to manipulate people's emotions (now making them inconsolably angry) to lure Geo back into battle. The episode ends on a cliffhanger with Mega Man and the two Gemini Sparks engaging in another heated battle.
17	"Utau Denpa Kūkan" (唄う電波空間, Utau Denpa Kūkan; Singing Electromagnetic Wave Space)	"From Double to Bubble"	2007-02-03	2007-10-15 (TJ)
18	"Cancer Sanjō buku!" (キャンサー参上ブク!, Kyansā Sanjō buku!; Calling on Cancer buku!)	"From Double to Bubble"	2007-02-10	2007-10-15 (TJ)
The battle between Mega Man and both Gemini Sparks rages on, eventually taking to the sea itself. While Mega Man manages to get the upper-hand a few times, he is ultimately defeated. Before Gemini Spark can deliver the finishing blow, Lyra Note intervenes as a distraction, and Mega Man is spared. Then, young Claud Pincer is obsessed with Sonia Sky but is unable to get into a concert. The FM-ian Cancer fuses with Claud while trying to target a muscular bodyguard instead, and he becomes depressed that a scrawny child is the one who shares his wavelength. The EM Wave Fusion isn't perfect, so Cancer Bubble (with Claud's mentality) rages through Echo Ridge in an attempt to get concert tickets.
19	"Rockman Kyūbin" (ロックマン急便, Rokkuman Kyūbin; Rockman Express Mail)	"Mega Man Express and Wolf Woods"	2007-02-17	2007-10-29 (TJ)
20	"Ueki Shokujin wa Tsuki ni Howl" (植木職人は月に吠える, Ueki Shokujin wa Tsuki ni Hoeru; The Gardener Howls at the Moon)	"Mega Man Express and Wolf Woods"	2007-02-24	2007-10-29 (TJ)
Mega Man is stuck delivering mail throughout Echo Ridge. When he makes a stop at Luna's house (who has a crush on him), she formulates a plan to try to have future meetings with him through mail deliveries. Then, Mega Man battles with a new enemy, Wolf Woods, but he flees from battle. The next day, Geo meets Damian Wolfe, a gardener who reacts oddly to round-shaped objects. Meanwhile, Damian goes on a date at a shopping mall with a woman he gardens for while Geo participates in a contest there to try to win a telescope set.
21	"Wolf: Ikari no Hōkō!" (ウルフ 怒りの咆哮!, Urufu Ikari no Hōkō!; Wolf: Howl of Anger!)	"Wolf: Roar of Anger"	2007-03-03	2007-11-12 (TJ)
22	"Denpa na Yūrei" (デンパなユーレイ, Denpa na Yūrei; Electromagnetic Wave Ghost)	"Wolf: Roar of Anger"	2007-03-10	2007-11-12 (TJ)
While Damian and Samantha enjoy their date in the mall, Gemini Spark finally finalizes the EM Wave Transformation between Damien and the FM-ian Wolf, and Wolf Woods rampages through the mall. Mega Man and Lyra Note appear to battle, but ultimately, Samantha is able to calm him down. The FM-ian Wolf escapes and Damian recovers. Then, Luna wants to explore an abandoned theme park, so she takes Zack, Bud, Geo, and Pat along for the ride. However, strange things begin to occur, and Geo finds himself in a battle with Crown Thunder. However, Omega-Xis notices that Crown is not fused with a living human being, causing his transformation to be impervious.
23	"Fujimi no Jibaku Rei" (不死身のジバク霊, Fujimi no Jibaku Rei; The Immortal Suicidal Spirit)	"Collision Course"	2007-03-17	2007-11-26 (TJ)
24	"Ophiuchus Queen" (オヒュカス·クイーン, Ohyukasu Kuīn)	"Collision Course"	2007-03-31	2007-11-26 (TJ)
Crown Thunder takes an old pirate ship and prepares to launch it toward Echo Ridge, but Mega Man and Lyra Note battle together to try to stop the enemy. They discover that the pirate ship is the source of his power, and by attacking it, they're able to defeat him. Then, Luna is devastated when she assumes Mega Man and Lyra Note are involved romantically, causing her anger to show at school. Her friends take her to a Sonia Sky concert to cheer her up, but the FM-ian Ophiuchus targets Luna's devastation and offers her the power to capture Mega Man. (On Toonami Jetstream's website, this episode was listed as "Amusement Gone Awry")
25	"Itoshi no Rockman-sama♥" (愛しのロックマン様♥, Itoshi no Rokkuman-sama♥; Beloved Rockman-sama♥)	"Biggest Fan or Biggest Foe?"	2007-03-31	2007-12-10 (TJ)
Geo encounters Ophiuchus Queen, the EM Wave Fusion of Luna and Ophiuchus, who knocks him unconscious. This leaves Sonia to take care of the enemy, transforming into Lyra Note to battle. Mega Man later intervenes, and together, they knock Luna out of the EM Wave Fusion. Ophiuchus escapes. Afterwards, Geo recalls his encounters with the FM-ians from the previous 12 episodes, and he questions the connections between his father's disappearance and Omega-Xis's appearance on Earth.
26	"Kaettekita Otoko" (帰って来た男, Kaettekita Otoko; The Man Who Returned)	N/A	2007-04-07	-
Tom returns to AMAKEN after weeks of absence, but he is completely under Cygnus's control now. He attempts to throw Aaron off a skyscraper, but Mega Man rescues him. After a heated battle with Cygnus Wing, Tom reveals to Geo that Omega-Xis was the one who killed Kelvin. The startling news causes Geo to collapse into a river where he is washed away.
27	"Cygnus Gundan" (キグナス軍団, Kigunasu Gundan; Cygnus Corps)	N/A	2007-04-14	-
Tom gathers the FM-ians together and gives them the power to mimic their EM Wave Human forms without the aid of the humans they merged with. Meanwhile, Omega-Xis helps Aaron find Geo's body and he is rushed to a hospital. That night, Geo and Omega-Xis reunite for an emotional argument until Omega-Xis leaves Earth completely.
28	"Denpa Kuraishisu" (電波クライシス, Denpa Kuraishisu; Electromagnetic Wave Crisis)	N/A	2007-04-21	-
With Mega Man out of the picture because Omega-Xis's flee from Earth, the FM-ians and EM viruses begin to rampage through Echo Ridge, and only Lyra Note appears to battle. Geo, however, uses his Transer and Battle Cards to try to take out EM viruses, and he notes to his friends that Mega Man will never come back to save them.
29	"Satellite no Kiseki" (サテライトの奇蹟, Sateraito no Kiseki; The Satellites' Miracle)	N/A	2007-04-28	-
When EM viruses threaten to harm Geo, Omega-Xis returns and forces the EM Wave Fusion into Mega Man. Though Geo is angry, they agree to cooperate and battle with all of the FM-ians. However, they are overpowered, and Cygnus Wing captures Omega-Xis for the Andromeda Key. But three forces appear in the sky to stop the fighting, and they take Geo with them when they leave.
30	"Kenja no Inori" (賢者の祈り, Kenja no Inori; Prayer of the Sages)	N/A	2007-05-05	-
Geo meets the Three Satellite Administrators and Sages of Planet AM: Pegasus Magic, Leo Kingdom, and Dragon Sky. They explain to Geo what Andromeda is: an ultimate machine designed to destroy planets. As Andromeda becomes activated, they offer Geo the power to stop it: Star Force. They help Geo free Omega-Xis from the FM-ians' clutches and, reunited, the two go after the enemies.
31	"Star Force!" (スターフォース!, Sutā Fōsu!)	N/A	2007-05-12	-
Mega Man battles with the FM-ians and uses Star Force forms Ice Pegasus, Fire Leo, and Green Dragon to succeed. Gemini Spark also appears, attempting to steal the Andromeda Key from Cygnus Wing, but an Atomic Blazer attack from Fire Leo Mega Man both destroys Cygnus (freeing Tom) and causes Gemini Spark to flee. Omega-Xis proceeds to smash the key before the two return home, only for Pat to find it in the rubble.
32	"Kesshū! FM-seidan" (結集! FM星団, Kesshū! Efuemu-seidan; Concentration! Planet FM Cluster)	N/A	2007-05-19	-
The FM-ians regroup, now without a leader, and try to formulate a plan. However, Cancer has the remains of the Andromeda Key and figures they can refill it with minus energy from the humans. Gemini Spark helps them create a program that can also allow the FM-ians to take on the appearance of the humans they once merged with.
33	"Gyakushū! FM-seidan" (逆襲! FM星団, Gyakushū! Efuemu-seidan; Counterattack! Planet FM Cluster)	N/A	2007-05-26	-
As the FM-ians (in their doppelgänger forms) explore Echo Ridge, Taurus and Wolf decide to transform into Taurus Fire and Wolf Woods to attack the city. Mega Man intervenes, but discovers his enemies can now use Battle Cards. Though the FM-ians have the upper-hand, their power soon drains and they are forced to escape.
34	"Kizamaro wa Mita!" (キザマロは見た!, Kizamaro wa Mita!; Kizamaro Saw!)	N/A	2007-06-02	-
Luna and Bud get angry with one another, which confuses Zack when he witnesses Ophiuchus and Taurus (in the forms of Luna and Bud) getting along just fine. He decides to spy on them, excited that Luna and Bud may be having a secret romantic relationship.
35	"Shirisugita Kizamaro" (知りすぎたキザマロ, Shirisugita Kizamaro; Kizamaro, Who Knew Too Much)	N/A	2007-06-09	-
Zack continues to try to convince Geo that something is up with Luna and Bud. Omega-Xis eventually realizes that Zack is probably trailing the FM-ians. Sure enough, the two FM-ians attack Zack for following them, but Mega Man intervenes to rescue his friend.
36	"Lovely Unbalance" (ラブリィ·アンバランス, Raburī Anbaransu)	N/A	2007-06-16	-
Libra (taking the form of Shepard) starts hosting a popular game show, and Sonia Sky is invited to be a contestant. Meanwhile, the other FM-ians try to find a way to gather minus energy from the game show, but Libra is more interested in hosting it for fun.
37	"Libra no Sentaku" (リブラの選択, Ribura no Sentaku; Libra's Choice)	N/A	2007-06-23	-
The FM-ians attack the game show after Libra neglects to gather minus energy himself, so Mega Man and Lyra Note work together to battle all of them. Libra, upset that his fun is over, turns into Libra Scales and helps Mega Man battle against his teammates.
38	"Ippiki Ōkami, Kawareru" (一匹狼、飼われる, Ippiki Ōkami, Kawareru; The Lone Wolf, as a Pet)	N/A	2007-06-30	-
Wolf, being trailed by Copper, escapes into a young girl's Transer. When he awakes, he finds that he unintentionally entered the body of an EM Wave Pet, now acting as the girl's pet dog. However, he eventually becomes attached to the girl and remains in that form.
39	"Kawareta Ōkami, Abareru" (飼われた狼、暴れる, Kawareta Ōkami, Abareru; The Pet Wolf, in a Rage)	N/A	2007-07-07	-
Geo enters Omega-Xis in a dog show as an EM Wave Pet as retribution for the telescope set he broke. There, he meets Wolf in the form of a dog, and seeing the full moon causes Wolf to make a startling transformation into Wolf Woods. However, the girl is able to talk him out of it, but Wolf is forced to return to life as an FM-ians.
40	"Iinchō Shitsuren Daisakusen buku!" (委員長失恋大作戦ブク!, Iinchō Shitsuren Daisakusen buku!; The Chairman's Great Unrequited Love Plan buku!)	N/A	2007-07-14	-
While walking through the city, Cancer Bubble witnesses Luna's anger over the possibility that Mega Man and Lyra Note are "dating," and he assumes that her anger is refilling the Andromeda Key. Thus, he follows her through school, attempting to upset her in order to gather energy.
41	"Drama de Shuraba no Daisakusen buku" (ドラマで修羅場の大作戦ブク!, Dorama de Shuraba no Daisakusen buku!; The Great Drama Fight Scene Plan buku)	N/A	2007-07-21	-
Cancer Bubble and Crown Thunder distract Mega Man and Lyra Note in battle so Cancer Bubble can record Lyra Note's voice and use it to start another conflict with Luna. Soon enough, the two girls are at each other's necks over Mega Man, but find a common ground in beating Cancer Bubble to a pulp.
42	"Hatsumei Daimaō Utagai" (発明大魔王宇田海, Hatsumei Daimaō Utagai; Utagai, the Great Demon Inventor King)	N/A	2007-07-28	-
When Geo breaks his Transer, he goes to AMAKEN to have it fixed, and receives a Wave Scanner as backup. Tom shows him some of his inventions, including a lure for viruses. Unfortunately, the device attracts a large amount of viruses to the lab.
43	"AMAKEN Daipanikku" (アマケン大パニック, Amaken Daipanikku; The Great AMAKEN Panic)	N/A	2007-08-04	-
Geo is being overwhelmed by the horde of viruses, and Cancer Bubble makes matters worse by stealing the device and crushing Mega Man with the expanding horde of viruses. Luckily, he accidentally breaks it, and flees rather than fight.
44	"Libra Balance Hōkai" (リブラ·バランス崩壊, Ribura Baransu Hōkai; Collapse of Libra Balance)	N/A	2007-08-11	-
After the game show once hosted by Libra (as Shepard) begins to go under, he begins to drown under the pressure of new decisions. Thus, Libra's mentality is split into two, represented by the elements fire and water. The two fight over control of Libra's body as he seeks new opportunities and overcomes bad luck.
45	"Uchūjin mo Nayande Iru" (宇宙人も悩んでいる, Uchūjin mo Nayande Iru; Aliens Also Worry)	N/A	2007-08-18	-
To acquire more fame, Libra (as Shepard) becomes a published author, and everyone is nuts for his book. However, when fame becomes too much, Libra Scales erupts and battles with Mega Man. In order to avoid defeat, the two Libras (fire and water) realize they require each other for Libra's full potential, the two reunite before escaping.
46	"W Luna no Daifuntō" (Wルナの大奮闘, Daburu Runa no Daifuntō; W Luna's Difficult Struggle)	N/A	2007-08-25	-
Luna decides to learn how to cook in order to impress Mega Man, and Geo's mother Hope offers to give her cooking lessons at the Stelar house. Meanwhile, the FM-ian Ophiuchus (in the form of Luna) has been working constantly in order to feed her fellow FM-ians. Overworked and stressed, she plans to cut her teammates off from her financial income.
47	"W Luna no Tengoku to Jigoku" (Wルナの天国と地獄, Daburu Runa no Tengoku to Jigoku; W Luna's Heaven and Hell)	N/A	2007-09-01	-
Cancer, who finds Ophiuchus's own personal money stash, uses it to purchase an ice-making machine and then proceeds to rampage through Echo Ridge with an artificial ice floe. Mega Man appears and rescues Luna from the wreckage, who was waiting for him to give him some food she prepared for him. When Mega Man later eats it, he's surprised to find it tastes delicious.
48	"Warrock wa Gentleman" (ウォーロックはジェントルマン, Wōrokku wa Jentoruman; Warrock's a Gentleman)	N/A	2007-09-08	-
A mysterious comet appears close to Earth, and its wavelengths begin to affect the FM-ians in various ways, such as Wolf acting like a house dog, and Omega-Xis becoming exceedingly polite and proper. Against this backdrop Geo is forced to fight Cancer Bubble, who has grown to a prodigious size.
49	"Gaikotsu Change!" (がいこつチェンジ!, Gaikotsu Chenji!; Skeleton Change!)	N/A	2007-09-15	-
Using the power granted to him by the comet, Crown enters a museum and begins fusing with dinosaur skeletons. Geo happens to be there on a field-trip and fights back as Mega Man. However, since Omega-Xis is still incessantly polite (due to the comet), he becomes uncooperative in battle. Eventually, the comet passes Earth and the effects on the FM-ians subside, marking one more victory for Mega Man.
50	"Kokuhaku" (告白, Kokuhaku; Confession)	N/A	2007-09-22	-
When Aaron uncovers the space station Kelvin vanished within, Omega-Xis finally tells the real story behind his involvement with Kelvin's disappearance on that day. In order to rescue Kelvin and his teammates from an FM-ian attack, Omega-Xis transformed them all into radio waves. Omega-Xis senses Kelvin's presence on the space station, which is broadcasting a Brother Band signal through space. However, the FM-ians suddenly begin attacking Echo Ridge, and Geo rushes to the scene.
51	"Brother Band" (ブラザーバンド, Burazā Bando)	N/A	2007-09-29	-
Working with Lyra Note, Mega Man battles the FM-ians as they attack Echo Ridge. Amidst the battle, the Andromeda Key is broken, and all of the gathered minus energy is lost. Then, the FM-ians' king sends a signal to his soldiers telling them to withdraw from their attacks on Earth. Aaron suspects that Kelvin used Brother Band to convince the FM Planet that Earth is not hostile. However, Pat is not content with withdrawing from Earth, so as Gemini Spark, he murders Taurus one night and harnesses his body as energy for a new Andromeda Key.
52	"Minus Energy" (マイナスエネルギー, Mainasu Enerugī)	N/A	2007-10-06	-
Gemini Spark's spree continues as he systematically deletes his former comrades to fill up the Andromeda Key, forcing their wave forms out of their W bodies and brutally murdering them one by one. Geo, meanwhile, receives the Star Carrier from Tom, and Omega-Xis encounters Cancer—the only survivor of Gemini's rampage—pleading for help.
53	"Futatsu no Kizuna" (ふたつの絆, Futatsu no Kizuna; Twin Bonds)	N/A	2007-10-13	-
Gemini Spark go after Sonia in an attempt to delete Lyra, but Geo intervenes to rescue her. In the process of defeating Gemini Spark, Pat's true identity is revealed, and Sonia also learns that Geo is really Mega Man. With all the secrets out in the open, Geo and Sonia agree to fight together for Earth's safety. Meanwhile, Gemini Spark uses the gathered energy to revive Andromeda.
54	"Andromeda" (アンドロメダ, Andoromeda)	N/A	2007-10-20	-
Fully revived, Andromeda proceeds toward Echo Ridge, annihilating cities in its path. Mega Man and Lyra Note attempt to stop it but are overpowered. Lyra Note is left incapacitated, so Mega Man proceeds alone with Star Force, but his attempts are in vain. Amidst the battle, Luna, Bud, and Zack witness Mega Man revert into Geo (Luna was only half-conscious at the time, and this shows in later episodes, where she says that it's impossible that Geo was really Mega Man).
55	"FM-ō Cepheus" (FM王ケフェウス, Efuemu-ō Kefeusu; FM King Cepheus)	N/A	2007-10-27	-
The Satellite Administrators sacrifice themselves in order to destroy Andromeda. However, Gemini Spark White murders his other half to harness his minus energy and revive Andromeda once again, but Omega-Xis is only able to crush the key once and for all before the Earth is erased. Afterwards, the FM King Cepheus descends onto Earth to take responsibility for his wrongful attacks on Earth, defeating Gemini White Spark personally for good. He also grants Geo the chance to speak with his father, although Kelvin is not yet ready to return home. Pat's body is also discovered, with no memories of meeting Gemini and after. With the war against the FM-ians over, life is a lot brighter for Geo and his friends.

== See also ==
- List of Mega Man Star Force episodes
- Mega Man Star Force (video-game)
- Mega Man Star Force (anime)
