= 4 Angies =

- Genre: Comedy
- Based on: Women to women
- Developed by: Channel 3 HD
- Voices of: Pui Pimolwan; Kai-chan Meesuk; Niana Kulnadd; Kalamare Patcharasri
- Country of origin: Thailand
- Original language: Thai
- No. of seasons: 3 seasons (+ 1 movie)
- No. of episodes: 56

Production
- Executive producers: Sopitha Thammasangkhiti; Sutep Tonnniratana
- Running time: 11 minutes
- Production company: Homerun Entertainment

Original release
- Network: Channel 3 HD
- Release: 11 December 2006 – 19 November 2010

4 Angies (Thai: โฟร์แองจี้ส์ สี่สาวแสนซน; RTGS: Fo Aengchi Si Sao Saen Son; lit. '4 Angies: 4 girls actively') is a 2006 Thai computer-animated comedy cartoon series produced by Anya Animation and released by Channel 3 HD and Homerun Entertainment. Four Angies, loosely based on the TV show of the name by Women to women. There are 4 women in different characters, the story of cartoon, four naughty girls is the three-dimensional animation about 4 Thai naughty girls in school (respectively Pui, Kai-chan, Nina and Kalamare).

After a while, Four Angies aired on Canal J, a top-rated France kid's TV show. After France had the copyright, "Four Angies, Four Naughty Girls" changed to "KaNiKaZo, Super Angies".

== Plot ==
=== Season 1 ===
The main characters meet at Angel Elementary School where the four girls, Kalamare, Nina, Pui, and Kai-chan all come to school late (mostly due to Nina's uncontrollable dancing to music). Now it is up to the four girls to figure out how to sneak inside the school without being caught by their Principal and being punished for being late to class.

=== Season 2 ===
An evil alien wizard appears at the elementary school, wants to destroy the world. Another teacher is a superhero trying to stop this, so he recruits the Four Angies to help because his power has been damaged.

=== Season 3: The Wonders of the 7 Notes ===
The Four Angies are camping near Grandma-sells-everything shop. They had a nightmare that Angel town flooded then woke up at the north pole where they met Mr. Manut Hima (Snowman in Thai). Additionally, there were seven notes hidden around angel town that went missing in their music box, which must be found in order to calm down Gaia from flooding the world.

=== Special season: Explore the wonderful world ===
Only lists when this special season was aired, on November 19, 2010, on channel 3 Thailand. Additionally, the air time was 6:00-6:30 p.m.

== Cast ==
=== Main ===
- Pui: one of the Four Angies, and is named after the host of the program “Pimonwan Hunthongkham”. The animated character has a stingy personality and likes to hoard things in her pocket. She carries around storage bags called "magic bag" which is ready to use for any situation. And also everyone refers she as "The Auntie" because she often slow and mature.
- Kai-Chan: one of the Four Angies and is named after another program host “Mee Suk Chaengmee Suk”. Kai-Chan's personality is neat and very sweet. This character is afraid of teddy bears in season 1. She had mind control called "a heart-melting wink-wink eyes" magical power, where if people stare at her they will be put under a trance and agree with her.
- Nina: one of the Four Angies and is named after a host of the program “Kunndadda Patchimsawat”. The animated character has a personality that is very neat and holds high responsibility. Because of her responsibility, she easily gains the trust of teachers. However, one flaw she had is that she cannot control her dancing whenever she hears music which is "Nina Dance Tornado" magical power.
- Kalamare: one of the Four Angies and is named after one of the hosts “Patcharasri Benchamas”. The personality of Kalamare is harsh and straightforward. She likes to use force and talk very loudly so she has a "surround voice" magical power. She is confident to do morally right things and love her friends.

=== Supporting characters ===
- Captain J: the last man in the Mars that survive from the Wizard Doo Hoo's destruction. After his home was destroyed, he has come to the earth and become a teacher at Angel Primary School under the name "Teacher Jae" to wait for Wizard Doo Hoo and be a superhero for protecting the world.
- X-4: a member of "X-Tra Ordinary 4", a boy group that has 4 members and they are the same age as Four Angies. X-4 is the rival of Four Angies. They like to bully and make trouble.
- Wizard Doo Hoo: an alien that wants to destroy the world but he is intercepted by Captain J and caused his staff fallen into Pui's hands.
- The headmaster: a very strict teacher and also he was a toy-loving person, but he did not want anyone to know his behavior. Therefore, he makes a rule not allow students to bring toys to school because he will not be able to control himself to play the toys.
- Teacher Tim: a kind teacher and is also the homeroom teacher of Four Angies.
- Grandma: the shop owner at "Grandma's shop", everything that customers want are in the shop.
- Little Ice: a child that like to eat ice cream. He is always holding ice cream all the time and he was often bullied by the X-4.

== Release ==
This animation was released on channel 3 in Thailand since 2006 and Canal J in France.
