= List of Ghost Hunt episodes =

The episodes of the anime series Ghost Hunt are based on the manga series written and illustrated by Shiho Inada. The series premiered on October 3, 2006, in Japan on TV Tokyo where it ran for twenty-five episodes until its conclusion. The series focuses on the work of the Shibuya Psychic Research Center, particularly its teenage manager Kazuya Shibuya and Mai Taniyama, a first-year high schooler who becomes his assistant after his usual assistant, Lin, is hurt while they are working on a case at Mai's school. They are joined by a monk (named Houshou Takigawa but called Monk), a self-styled shrine maiden (Ayako Matsuzaki), a famous medium (Masako Hara), and an Australian Catholic Priest (John Brown), and later on in the series a fourth-year high-schooler named Yasuhara [Episode 14]

The anime is licensed for English release on Region 1 DVD by Funimation Entertainment, which released the entire series across two 2-disc volumes, and later in a single box set.

== Episode list ==
No.	Title	Original release date
1	"File 1: Evil Spirits All Over!? Part 1"; Transliteration: "FILE1 「Akuryō ga ippai!?」#1" (Japanese: FILE1 「悪霊がいっぱい!?」#1)	October 3, 2006
Mai meets Naru while exchanging ghost stories with her friends, and learns her school principal has hired him to investigate an allegedly haunted school building. Mai later causes the injury of Naru's assistant and is forced to stand in as a temporary replacement. The principal also brings in several exorcists and mediums, and more help arrives in the form of a classmate of Mai's, who claims to have the ability to sense spirits.
2	"File 1: Evil Spirits All Over!? Part 2"; Transliteration: "FILE1 「Akuryō ga ippai!?」 #2" (Japanese: FILE1 「悪霊がいっぱい!?」 #2)	October 10, 2006
Each member of the team proposes a different theory as to what is responsible for the odd occurrences. After collecting data overnight, Naru begins to doubt the presence of any spirits and instead theorizes that land subsidence is the cause of all the ghostly activity. Mai's classmate, Kuroda, fiercely insists that a poltergeist is at work, and evidence appearing to support her idea soon arises.
3	"File 1: Evil Spirits All Over!? Part 3"; Transliteration: "FILE1 「Akuryō ga ippai!?」 #3" (Japanese: FILE1 「悪霊がいっぱい!?」 #3)	October 17, 2006
After disappearing for a night, Naru conducts an experiment involving all those associated with the case. He implants a hypnotic suggestion in their minds regarding a chair in a sealed room moving overnight. His experiment proving successful, Naru reveals his explanation for the latest developments, correctly accusing one of the group of mimicking a poltergeist's acts. After the conclusion of the case, Naru offers Mai a part-time job at the SPR, which she accepts.
4	"File 2: The Doll House Part 1"; Transliteration: "FILE2 「Ningyō no ie」 #1" (Japanese: FILE2 「人形の家」 #1)	October 24, 2006
The SPR team, joined by the exorcists and mediums from the previous case, are requested at a house where poltergeist-like activity has been taking place. Soon after their arrival, the ghostly occurrences escalate, leading Takigawa to conclude the house is haunted by something more than a mere poltergeist. A young girl in the family, Ayami, exhibits strange behavior, claiming her doll Minnie has been speaking to her. The SPR team observe Minnie closely, with disturbing results.
5	"File 2: The Doll House Part 2"; Transliteration: "FILE2 「Ningyō no ie」#2" (Japanese: FILE2 「人形の家」 #2)	October 31, 2006
Ayami reveals Minnie has been exerting a strict control over her, punishing her whenever she breaks a promise to Minnie. The team believes the doll is being used as a vessel by a spirit. After Ayami is involved in a near-fatal accident, Naru discovers previous residents of the house have been plagued with frightening incidents, all resulting in the death of young children.
6	"File 2: The Doll House Part 3"; Transliteration: "FILE2 「Ningyō no ie」#3" (Japanese: FILE2 「人形の家」 #3)	November 7, 2006
After a failed attempt to exorcise the spirits of the dead children, a well appears in the middle of the living room. Mai is pulled into the well by a malevolent spirit during a second exorcism. While unconscious, she sees the abduction of a little girl and the subsequent suicide of the child's distraught mother. With this new knowledge, the team is able to cleanse the spirits of the woman and children, restoring peace to the old house.
7	"File 3: The After School Hexer Part 1"; Transliteration: "FILE3 「Hōkago no jusha」 #1" (Japanese: FILE 3 「放課後の呪者」 #1)	November 14, 2006
The SPR are asked to handle a case at the all-girls Yuasa High School, where a series of unusual events are seemingly related to a cursed desk and a haunted clubroom. Rumors circulating the school population implicate a girl with psychokinesis, who had previously vowed to 'curse to death' all the doubters of her gifts.
8	"File 3: The After School Hexer Part 2"; Transliteration: "FILE3 「Hōkago no jusha」 #2" (Japanese: FILE 3 「放課後の呪者」 #2)	November 21, 2006
The team arrive at the conclusion that the sheer number of occurrences at the school would require a psychic power far greater than anyone could possibly possess. Coupled with Masako's insistence that the school houses no spirits, Naru begins to believe someone is using a form of voodoo, calling on gods to carry out their desires. The discovery of human-like dolls under the desk and in the clubroom seem to confirm this.
9	"File 3: The After School Hexer Part 3"; Transliteration: "FILE3 「Hōkago no jusha」 #3" (Japanese: FILE 3 「放課後の呪者」 #3)	November 28, 2006
Evidence against the psychokinetic girl, Kasai, begins to pile up. Mai refuses to believe Kasai is responsible, despite Takigawa and Ayako's beliefs to the contrary, saying she has a feeling within her that Kasai is innocent. While searching for more dolls, Mai is lured to an open manhole by the ghost of a crying child. Naru fails to save her from falling in and instead, they both find themselves inside the manhole.
10	"File 3: The After School Hexer Part 4"; Transliteration: "FILE3 「Hōkago no jusha」 #4" (Japanese: FILE 3 「放課後の呪者」 #4)	December 5, 2006
Mai, Takigawa, and Ayako destroy the dolls, effectively removing the 'curse' on the school. Naru is sent to the hospital as a result of the manhole accident, where he makes a startling revelation regarding the past of someone at the school. He clears Kasai's name, but is forced to accuse someone close to her in the process. After the case, the team return to the SPR, where Naru successfully tests Mai for psychic abilities.
11	"File 4: Ghost Story in the Park!?"; Transliteration: "FILE4 「Kōen no kaidan!?」" (Japanese: FILE4 「公園の怪談!?」)	December 12, 2006
Masako requests Naru to investigate a park where couples have had water dumped over them from thin air, which has been happening for over a period of six months. The team, excluding Lin, split up at Masako's suggestion into pairs and they soon attract the spirit of a woman. Taking possession of Masako's body, the woman explains she died soon after being cheated on by her boyfriend. Mai convinces her to let go and move on to heaven, but not until they have forced the cheating partner to acknowledge the hurt he had caused her.
12	"File 5: Silent Christmas Part 1"; Transliteration: "FILE5 「SILENT CHRISTMAS」#1" (Japanese: FILE5 「サイレント·クリスマス」#1)	December 19, 2006
John brings the SPR their next case on Christmas Eve. Children at a local church/orphanage are being possessed by the ghost of a selectively mute boy who vanished one day during a game of hide-and-seek. The boy, Kenji, hides in the woods once he claims a body. While in control of a child, he mistakes Lin for his dead father and clings to him. John exorcises Kenji from the child he resides in, but Kenji then promptly possesses Mai.
13	"File 5: Silent Christmas Part 2"; Transliteration: "FILE5 「SILENT CHRISTMAS」#2" (Japanese: FILE5 「サイレント·クリスマス」#2)	December 26, 2006
While Naru searches for Kenji's body, Lin is ordered to play with Kenji/Mai. Lin snaps shortly after and Kenji, still in Mai's body, races into the woods. After Takigawa and John find Kenji, Naru tells him his father is waiting for him in heaven and asks him where he is. Kenji shows him the place he'd hid and died in and releases Mai, who sees Kenji's tragic death in a dream.
14	"File 6: Forbidden Pastime Part 1"; Transliteration: "FILE6 「Kinjirareta asobi」#1" (Japanese: FILE6 「禁じられた遊び」#1)	January 9, 2007
The highly publicized Rokuryo High School is brought to the SPR's attention when students report a series of terrifying events, including a ghostly dog, attacking them. The SPR gathers information with the help of top student and council president Yasuhara, and learn the incidents began after Sakauchi, a freshman, committed suicide. While installing cameras around the school, Mai encounters Sakauchi's ghost.
15	"File 6: Forbidden Pastime Part 2"; Transliteration: "FILE6 「Kinjirareta asobi」#2" (Japanese: FILE6 「禁じられた遊び」#2)	January 16, 2007
Mai has a dream about the school where dozens of spirits, including will-o'-the-wisps, are devouring each other. Mai and Masako later see Sakauchi's ghost being similarly absorbed. They discover that "orikirisama", a type of Ouija boarding, had become popular among the students, and that Sakauchi may have been one of the propagators of the trend, resulting in the many spirits inhabiting the school. While retrieving a video tape, Mai finds herself locked in a room with bottles crashing down around her, releasing the smell of formalin.
16	"File 6: Forbidden Pastime Part 3"; Transliteration: "FILE6 「Kinjirareta asobi」#3" (Japanese: FILE6 「禁じられた遊び」#3)	January 23, 2007
Mai wakes up in the nurse's office, after several events nearly lead her to her death again. Mai's lamentation on learning the SPR have been asked to leave after the latest disasters prompts Naru to muse over a theory. He speculates that the spirits were deliberately called and expected to devour each other until the strongest remained. This spirit would possess the school, but require human sacrifices. Lin discovers the instructions for 'Orikiri-sama' have been designed to ensure that participants unknowingly contribute to a death spell, the target of which is someone at the school.
17	"File 6: Forbidden Pastime Part 4"; Transliteration: "FILE6 「Kinjirareta asobi」#4" (Japanese: FILE6 「禁じられた遊び」#4)	January 30, 2007
Naru and Lin begin a ritual to return the curse to its casters, thereby leaving the curse's target unharmed. Mai learns that this ritual will affect most of the school's student population, as they, while unknowingly, contributed to the curse. Her attempt to stop it by using the Buddhist Mantras, taught by Takigawa, fails, but Naru and Lin are able to lift the curse with little harm to the students.
18	"File 7: The Bloodstained Labyrinth Part 1"; Transliteration: "FILE7 「Chinurareta meikyū」#1" (Japanese: FILE7 「血ぬられた迷宮」#1)	February 6, 2007
Madoka, an associate of Naru's, requests the SPR take on a case for the former Prime Minister and investigate the mysterious disappearances of young people at one of his properties. Before the case, Naru asks Yasuhara to pretend to be SPR's director in his stead. The SPR team join two other teams of investigators, one of which requests they all participate in a séance which has an unexpected result. The team learns Mai is an orphan.
19	"File 7: The Bloodstained Labyrinth Part 2"; Transliteration: "FILE7 「Chinurareta meikyū」#2" (Japanese: FILE7 「血ぬられた迷宮」#2)	February 13, 2007
Members of the other teams begin disappearing. In a search of the house, John finds a secret room that enables the SPR team to add to the information they learned from Madoka of the estate's past owners. Shortly after, Mai has a dream in which she experiences first-hand the death of someone from the estate.
20	"File 7: The Bloodstained Labyrinth Part 3"; Transliteration: "FILE7 「Chinurareta meikyū」#3" (Japanese: FILE7 「血ぬられた迷宮」#3)	February 20, 2007
The dream leaves Mai traumatized, but prompts new speculation by the team regarding the house's spirits. Lin carries out a ritual to summon the spirit of one of the missing people, who gives the SPR team a new lead. The discovery of one of the missing people's corpse induces Oliver Davis, one of the investigators on another team, to reveal himself as an impostor.
21	"File 7: The Bloodstained Labyrinth Part 4"; Transliteration: "FILE7 「Chinurareta meikyū」#4" (Japanese: FILE7 「血ぬられた迷宮」#4)	February 27, 2007
Naru reveals Madoka's true motive behind requesting they take on the case was to expose the fake Oliver Davis. Naru informs the team their job is therefore finished, despite Mai's protests. While the group prepares to leave, Masako disappears, and Mai has a dream that allows her to lead the team straight to the missing girl. A malevolent spirit attacks the girls, but Lin is able to ward it off and the team escapes unharmed. With no other way of removing the spirits, the house is later purified by fire.
22	"File 8: The Cursed House Part 1"; Transliteration: "FILE8 「Noroi no ie」#1" (Japanese: FILE8 「呪いの家」#1)	March 6, 2007
SPR is asked by a person who comes all the way out from the seaside to solve a dangerous case, of which three psychics have already attempted to solve and died as a result. Naru is possessed by a spirit when Ayako exorcises a strong spirit possessing a member of the family involved. Mai dreams of the history of the spirits, with her teammates assuming roles within the dream, and Naru guiding her to where the spirits have gone.
23	"File 8: The Cursed House Part 2"; Transliteration: "FILE8 「Noroi no ie」#2" (Japanese: FILE8 「呪いの家」#2)	March 13, 2007
The remaining psychics tour around the area in order to verify Mai's dreams. A member of the family tries to commit suicide, fearing that others may be killed as a result of possession. Ayako provides each family member with protective charms, though the two children and another family member refuse to use them. Mai uses the Shinto Kuji, taught by Ayako, in order to prevent Katsuki, one of the family members, from jumping off a cliff, but ends up affecting another family member, Wakako, leaving lacerations on their backs. However, it does wards off the spirits possessing them.
24	"File 8: The Cursed House Part 3"; Transliteration: "FILE8 「Noroi no ie」#3" (Japanese: FILE8 「呪いの家」#3)	March 20, 2007
Nao, a member of the family involved, is confirmed dead and Masako is sent to perform a ritual. Mai has another dream and is woken by Masako when a fire spreads in the main house. Another family member meets a tragic end after being possessed. An army of zombies soon enters the SPR's base to free the spirit that has possessed Naru.
25	"File 8: The Cursed House Part 4"; Transliteration: "FILE8 「Noroi no ie」#4" (Japanese: FILE8 「呪いの家」#4)	March 27, 2007
Takigawa manages to banish the drowned corpses attacking the base, allowing the team some respite. When the sun rises, Ayako volunteers to purify the spirits and performs a successful exorcism, surprising the members of the team, but notes another force is still at work. Naru wakes up and the team moves to finish off the unseen force causing the disasters. After the team struggles to exorcise with the spirits involved, Naru uses his own psychokinetic powers and finishes the job, only to collapse afterward. Lin admits Naru's PK is so powerful it can easily damage his body, which is why he does not use it. He reawakens in the hospital with the rest of the team, cheerfully visiting him in his room.
