= List of Meine Liebe episodes =

The anime from Bee Train studio was directed by Koichi Mashimo and had Minako Shiba as the character designer. The first season of the anime was aired on the Animax network in November 2004 and the second season in January 2006. Though adapted from a dating sims game, the anime pushed aside the main character of Erika, and she makes only brief appearances during the series. can / goo performed by the opening theme music for the first season, "Mark" (刻印, Shirushi), and the ending theme music, "Face" (顔, Kao); both were arranged by Koichiro Tokinori and composed by POM, with lyrics by Tapiko. alice nine. performed the opening theme music for the second season, "Dawn" (暁, Akatsuki), and the ending theme music, "A Thousand Million Chandeliers" (幾億のシャンデリア, Ikuoku no Chandelier).

== Episode list ==
=== Meine Liebe ===
No.	Title	Directed by	Written by	Original release date
1	"Pride"; Transliteration: "Hokori" (Japanese: 誇り)	Shin'ya Kawadzura	Akemi Mende	November 4, 2004
Orphe has a dream about the day Robertine (Orphe's older sister) died. He is in a foul mood when he wakes and he is swept into an argument with Lui. A few days later, a note is spread in the academy revealing the fact that Ed is not of noble blood by birth and that he is his father's bastard son. Orphe is sure that Lui is behind it that he challenges him to a duel.
2	"Scandal"; Transliteration: "Shūbun" (Japanese: 醜聞)	Hiroshi Morioka	Akemi Mende	November 11, 2004
Ed remembers the time he came to live with his father, and his step mother's hatred. He is pining for his lost sister, who was sent away. One day in the town he encounters a girl with the same name as his sister, who tempts him to run away with her. It is later revealed that the girl was hired by his step mother to tempt him to break the academy rules and consequentially being thrown away, but Orphe and a mysterious man helps him out. Lui refuses to allow the headmaster to check the dormitory for the missing boys, claiming that they should govern themselves.
3	"Flower Bud"; Transliteration: "Tsubomi" (Japanese: 蕾み)	Tomoyuki Kurokawa	Akemi Mende	November 18, 2004
Camus tells Ed and Orphe about his childhood and his first meeting with Lui. A graduate of the academy, Victor Griffith, visit the academy. Camus, who has a special ability to sense both people's emotions and see into the future warns one of his classmates of approaching misfortune but is treated with fear and hatred in return. Griffith tells Camus he has the same ability and offers him to come with him and live a sheltered yet exciting life, but his motives are not as pure as they appears. Orphe and Ed meet the man who helped them the last episode, and learns that his name is Isaac.
4	"Foreign Country"; Transliteration: "Ikoku" (Japanese: 異国)	Masayuki Kurosawa	Hiroyuki Kawasaki	November 25, 2004
Naoji remembers his family away from Japan, and begins to have doubts regarding his right to belong in the Strahl class. The headmaster holds a simulations turnery and wants Naoji to fight with Orphe, but Naoji's doubts effects his performances. In an attempt to encourage him Ed takes Naoji to town, where they are approached by an inn keeper who invited them to visit a Japanese man on his death bed. Naoji stays with him all night and through that man's autobiography finds his strength back.
5	"Aloof"; Transliteration: "Kokō" (Japanese: 孤高)	Shin'ya Kawadzura	Akemi Mende	December 2, 2004
Lui's father calls him back home to attend a ball where he is introduced to a local beauty, the daughter of a nobleman that Lui's father wants Lui to marry. Lui agrees, while his friends try to persuade him against it. At the engagement party, the king's elder brother makes an appearance but soon after he leaves an explosive device is set off and only through Orphe Lui is saved. Lui cancels his marriage, having achieved his goal to make the family's rivals tense with his approaching beneficial political marriage.
6	"Mission"; Transliteration: "Ninmu" (Japanese: 任務)	Yūki Arie	Hiroyuki Kawasaki	December 9, 2004
Isaac visits an old friend of his, wanting him to write him a recommendation letter that will get him into Rosenstolz. Claiming to be a foreign writer who writes about the academy, Isaac talks to the students, but is disappointed with the Strahl class. He tells them about his time as a soldier. Someone breaks into the headmaster's office, and Orphe and Lui chase them but get locked in a warehouse. Isaac confronts other undercover agents like him, and refuses their hush money in order to save Lui and Orphe.
7	"Smile"; Transliteration: "Egao" (Japanese: 笑顔)	Hiroshi Morioka	Akemi Mende	December 16, 2004
=The Headmaster plans a game to alleviate the stress on campus. Orphe and Naoji are paired up for the game, and have their first serious talk. Naoji tells Orphe why he is such a good friend of Lui. They find the lost object, a key, while not even looking for it. The headmaster shows them that they key is actually a key to his secret safe where he stores news from the academy alumni from all over the world before relaying it to the king.
8	"Means"; Transliteration: "Shudan" (Japanese: 手段)	Tomoyuki Kurokawa	Hiroyuki Kawasaki	December 23, 2004
A recording device is discovered at the school. Due to a student exchange Naoji and Ed are sent away, while the academy hosts three students from a sister school. One of the students is a girl names Ishtar whose charismatic speech enflames the entire school, but makes Camus uneasy. She admits that her goal is to use the students' sympathy in order to get into Rosenstolz and bent the management to her will, and in a surprising act Lui joins forces with her. When Ishtar admits to Lui that she wants to take over the king's position Lui reveals that he never was on her side and threatens to uncover her if she will not leave immediately.
9	"Mirror Image"; Transliteration: "Kyōzō" (Japanese: 鏡像)	Shin'ya Kawadzura	Akemi Mende	January 6, 2005
It's Orphe's sister's memorial day and in an attempt to cheer him up Ed takes him to a walk to town at night where they meet up with Isaac, who brings them to a local pub. Orphe meets with the local drunkard Douglas and discovers the tragic circumstances of his life, but he is forced to decide between the memory of the dead and the living when Douglas steals his most precious possession.
10	Transliteration: "Dakuran" (Japanese: 濁乱)	Yūki Arie	Hiroyuki Kawasaki	January 13, 2005
A graduate of Rosenstolz Academy is disturbing the students with his offers of unimaginable pleasures. The five Strahl candidates set out to meet up with Josef Torger, but Orphe is surprised with what he discovers. Torger tells Orphe that his money comes from blackmailing the noblemen and politicians of Kuchen, and gives him a notebook with a documentation of those people's illegal activities. Headmaster Bartholomew goes to Torger's mention himself and offers Torger a teaching position in Rosenstolz, but Torger refuses, leaves Orphe his notebook and sets himself and his house on fire.
11	"Reality"; Transliteration: "Genjitsu" (Japanese: 現実)	Tomoyuki Kurokawa	Akemi Mende	January 20, 2005
Orpheus receives a visit from his dead sister's fiancé, who tells him that he has a lot to tell him. It appears the fiancé, desperate after his beloved's death, went into the lowest circles of society to discover who is responsible for her death. He warns Orphe and gives him a pocket watch that Orphe's sister once gave him, but as he drives away he loses control over his car and runs into a tree. The king is due to visit the academy and Lui's network of spies provides him with information that has him believed there's a plot to murder the king then. Orphe is unaware that his conversation with his sister's fiancé was overheard and is caught off guard by Beruze, who shoots him in the chest.
12	"Ruin"; Transliteration: "Haikyo" (Japanese: 廃墟)	Hiroshi Morioka	Akemi Mende	January 20, 2005
Lui travels to meet with his father, while Orphe falls into the river. Ed begins to be worried about Orphe's absence but as he consults Lui, Lui reveals to them the details he has uncovered regarding the plan to assassinate the king. Ed understands that there are more important things then Orphe's life on the line and agrees to help Lui protect the king, while Orphe struggles for his life. Orphe has to decide if he wants to fight for his life or give up and be with his beloved sister once more.
13	"Idea"; Transliteration: "Rinen" (Japanese: 理念)	Shin'ya Kawadzura	Akemi Mende	February 3, 2005
Isaac, who follows Beruze, see him shoot Orphe and saves him. He treats Orphe's wound and at Orphe's insistence reveals to him what he knows about the plan to assassinate the king. Meanwhile Lui position the other Strahl candidates in strategic points to protect the king from being assassinated. Beruze uncovers his true form and Isaac helps Orphe to reach the academy in time to confront him.

=== Meine Liebe ~Wieder~ ===
No.	Title	Directed by	Written by	Original release date
1	"Overture"; Transliteration: "Jokyoku" (Japanese: 序曲)	Shin'ya Kawadzura	Akemi Mende	January 22, 2006
After the vacation from the academy, Orpherus and Eduard are visited by headmaster Bartholomew but when they return to the school they find that he is gone. Isaac is back in England but he is required to return to Kuchen in a less than pleasant company and do something he is very uncomfortable with in the service of his country.
2	"Revolution"; Transliteration: "Kakumei" (Japanese: 革命)	Hideyo Yamashita	Akemi Mende	January 29, 2006
Headmaster Werner dictates that the school will go through a reform, claiming that good people does not always come from the best financial background. The entire school is abuzz, preparing for the series of tests that will determine who will learn in which class. Not everyone is as open minded about it as the headmaster and argues breaks between the students. Camus is not sure he can handle the pressure.
3	"Winner"; Transliteration: "Shōsha" (Japanese: 勝者)	Hisatoshi Shimizu	Akemi Mende	February 5, 2006
Orpherus and Edward gain an audience with the king, but Ailos pulls some connections and other people are brought in front of the king instead of them. Nearly despairing they decided that if the situation will call for it, they will not attend their candidate assessment tests. But the meeting with the king leaves them with more questions and answers, as it is clear that he is hiding something.
4	"Impatience"; Transliteration: "Shōsō" (Japanese: 焦燥)	Shin'ya Kawadzura	Akemi Mende	February 12, 2006
Ed's stepmother makes a pact with the Beruze, saying that if Beruze will get rid of Ed she will sign a petition and convince her husband to sign as well. Beruze calls Ed away from Rosenstolz in false pretence and there ambushes him.
5	"Cold Rain"; Transliteration: "Reiu" (Japanese: 冷雨)	Shin'ya Kawadzura	Akemi Mende	February 19, 2006
Ed's horse fell into a steep valley and Ed got injured, but he is not dead. While making his way home he realizes that his father is not really sick, and goes to confront his step mother. Meanwhile, Orphe is surprised to be visited by Ed's father and soon realizes that Ed has been set up. Together they follow Ed to Ed's home.
6	"Paradise"; Transliteration: "Rakuen" (Japanese: 楽園)	Hisatoshi Shimizu	Akemi Mende	February 26, 2006
Following the incident with Ed and his rising insecurities, Camus withdraws from Rosenstolz. He returns to his house but can't find the peace he has hoped for, while Ed and Orphe meet with his brother to try and convince him to encourage Camus to return. Camus finds that he lives close to Elmunt, and the two meet on their free time.
7	"Starting Point"; Transliteration: "Kiten" (Japanese: 起点)	Azumi Migakutsumuro	Akemi Mende	March 5, 2006
Camus struggles with his own feelings on whether or not he truly wants to leave Rosenstolz and his friends behind. He is visited by Lui, but does not hear an easy solution from him. While at home he gets closer to Elmunt and his family, resulting in a vision Camus had of Elmunt's little brother falling from a tree. Camus rescues him and recovers his faith in himself.
8	"Sunlight"; Transliteration: "Yōkō" (Japanese: 陽光)	Hideyo Yamamoto	Akemi Mende	March 12, 2006
Lui invites Orphe, Ed, Camus and Naoji to his house because his mother is feeling depressed. Orphe realizes that Lui's mother is depressed not only because her brother betrayed her other brother last year, but Lui refuses to tell him anything. Lui's mother breaks down in the middle of the visit, and Naoji helps her as well as himself to find peace once again.
9	"Escape"; Transliteration: "Tōbō" (Japanese: 逃亡)	Tomoaki Ōta	Akemi Mende	March 19, 2006
In the middle of the day the imperial army surround Rosenstolz and accuse Lui of severe treason. Lui's family is out of Kuchen and Lui is planning to run into hiding, while receiving help from an unexpected source. While on the run, the five Strahl candidates are intercepted by Isaac's men, and Isaac shoots at Orphe, but misses deliberately. Ed sees him.
10	"Intricacy"; Transliteration: "Sakusō" (Japanese: 錯綜)	Hisatoshi Shimizu	Akemi Mende	March 26, 2006
Ed searches for Isaac, walking in the less fortunate areas of the city at night, while Lui remains undercover with Naoji. Camus pretends to be sick so that Naoji would have an excuse for disappearing. Ed finds Isaac, who tells him to get Lui out of the country, as well as Professor Gerald, who agrees not to tell on him if he won't do it again.
11	"Shadow"; Transliteration: "An'ei" (Japanese: 暗影)	Azumi Migakutsumuro	Akemi Mende	April 2, 2006
Ed is bothered by his conversation with Isaac, while the pursuit after Lui continues. Lui tries to push Orphe away from him, but a talk with headmaster Werner shows Orphe that a true friend doesn't abandon a friend in need. Isaac and Beruze clash while Ed tells Orphe the truth about them. Daniel continues misleading Ailos. Beruze then takes over the palace and force the king to hear his demands.
12	"Confrontation"; Transliteration: "Taiji" (Japanese: 対峙)	Hideyo Yamamoto	Akemi Mende	April 9, 2006
Understanding that Beruze has made his move, Lui sets out to stop him, but Orphe, Naoji, Ed and Camus insists on coming as well. They are stopped by Ailos, but receive the unexpected support of the entire academy. Once they reach the sealed off palace, they are being shown to a tunnel by Professor Gerald, and confront with both Isaac and Beruze. Headmaster Bartholomew returns.
13	"Hope"; Transliteration: "Kibō" (Japanese: 希望)	Shin'ya Kawadzura	Akemi Mende	April 16, 2006
Beruze runs off once headmaster Bartholomew informs them that England and Kuchen are now official allies in the upcoming war, and the Strahl candidates chase after him. They find him in an abandoned warehouse where he confronts headmaster Werner, his half-brother, and tries to commit suicide. Once everything is over, the Strahl candidates have a conversation with the king, where he asks them to study diligently so that they could become his advisors. It is also revealed that Professor Gerald is actually one of the king's advisors who taught at the school as a favor for a friend – headmaster Bartholomew, who regained his position.

== DVD Volumes ==
Geneon Entertainment DVD releases
Volume	Released	Discs	Episodes
1	February 4, 2005	2	1
2	March 10, 2005	1	2
3	April 1, 2005	1	2
4	May 13, 2005	1	2
5	June 10, 2005	1	2
6	July 8, 2005	1	2
7	August 10, 2005	1	2

Geneon Entertainment DVD releases
Volume	Released	Discs	Episodes
1	February 24, 2006	2	1
2	March 24, 3006	2	1
3	April 21, 2006	2	2
4	May 25, 2006	2	2
5	June 23, 2006	2	
