= List of Soul Link episodes =

This is the complete episode listing for the anime adaptation of the visual novel Soul Link. The 12-episode series was animated by Picture Magic, with music composed by Hiroyuki Sawano.

== List of episodes ==
#	Title (Kanji)	Title (Romaji)	Translation	Synopsis
1	出会い	Deai	Encounter	Ryota and the other students travel to the Aries Station. Aya arrives at the spaceport. As they settle in, Ryota receives a message that his brother is coming for a visit.
2	接触	Sesshoku	Contact	Shuhei, Aki and Aya arrive on the station. During their first training simulation, Ryota buys time for Sayaka to find Aya and tell that she will not be able to see each other. After the training, warning klaxons signal an emergency.
3	勃発	Boppatsu	Outbreak	Terrorists begin their attack while the crew and passengers attempt to evacuate.
4	休息	Kyūsoku	Breathing Space	Some are stranded on the station. Shuhei and Cellaria are injured in battle. Flashback to Nao's childhood.
5	分岐点	Bunkiten	Watershed	Flashback to Aki's childhood. The military students prepare for a counter-assault on the terrorists.
6	別れ	Wakare	Farewell	Cellaria is captured. Shuhei attempts a rescue.
7	流転	Ruten	Flux	Discovery of a strange virus. Cooperation occurs all over the station for survival. Nao is injured in an attack.
8	願い	Negai	Desire	Nanami is found. The terrorists are double-crossed. Flashback to Yu's childhood.
9	覚醒	Kakusei	Rouse	Shuhei is being corrupted. Yu is captured but escapes with the help of her childhood friend.
10	迷走	Meisou	Stray	Cellaria's past is revealed. The military students make plans to leave the station.
10.5	特別回想編	(Special Recap Episode)	Cellaria/Nanami	Special recapCellaria's background story, and Nanami's background story. This episode is not included in the count of total number of episodes.
11	哀悼	Aitō	Mourning	Aya manages to escape at the cost of Gale's life who ensures her safety.
12	旅路	Tabiji	Journey	With the station starting to burn up in the atmosphere of Earth, the rest of the crew commence the evacuation of the station. The events shift forward for 1 year, where everyone returns to their normal lives. Most characters' futures are revealed as well.

== Theme songs ==
Opening

1. "Screaming" by Miyuki Hashimoto

Ending

1. "Dust Trail" by Miyuki Hashimoto
