= List of Air Gear episodes =

The anime Air Gear was produced by Toei Animation and directed by Hajime Kamegaki. It ran from April 4, 2006, until September 27, 2006, on TV Tokyo.

== Episode list ==
No.	Title	Directed by	Original release date
1	"Trick:1"	Hajime Kamegaki	April 4, 2006
Itsuki Minami, known as Ikki by his friends, got in a fight with a Storm Rider group called the Skull Saders, and lost. At that point he gets more and more involved with the world of Air Gear and discovers a secret that the Noyamano sisters kept from him. He then decides to try out a pair of Air Trecks from his sister and ends up at an Air Treck meeting challenging the Skull Saders team by accident. This is due to the attractiveness of Simca on Ikki.
2	"Trick:2"	Harume Kosaka	April 11, 2006
After seeing what he believes is The Wing's Road he is determined to continue Air Gear and even planning on making his own Air Treck team. When night falls he sees Simca in trouble and decides to help her out. The next night he watches Simca practice on her AT's, but this time she notices him. She gives Ikki a special prize, an emblem, not knowing at that moment that the Storm Rider team Rez-Boa Dogs is after it.
3	"Trick:3"	Michita Shiraishi	April 18, 2006
Ikki discovers that breaking the neon sign and two pairs of Air Trecks within a few days comes at a price. He also learns that Air Gear can be more than just riding a pair of Air Trecks. His friends on their part, Kazu and Onigiri discover something about Parts War on the internet, but they soon find out that it is not so easy as it looks.
4	"Trick:4"	Shinichi Masaki	April 25, 2006
After seeing Kazu and Onigiri badly hurt, he decides to take on the Night King in an E-Class battle, Hurdle. Before the battle had started it already gained a lot of attention in the Air Gear scene.
5	"Trick:5"	Ken Andō	May 2, 2006
Ikki being confronted by Spitfire about the 8 roads and their kings. Ringo on the other hand by Simca about Ikki's wings and as a potential Air Treck rider. Ringo also finds out that Simca is planning something.
6	"Trick:6"	Yoshihisa Matsumoto	May 9, 2006
The Storm Rider team Skull Saders challenged Sleeping Forest in a battle, but find out that it isn't a convincing Sleeping Forest. Instead it has members of the East Side Gunz and the former leader of the Storm Rider team Night King. The battle is a fact and the winner becomes clear between the rivals.
7	"Trick:7"	Ichirō Suzuki	May 16, 2006
Ikki gets his first prize from winning in the battle with the Night King, he improved his AT's with it and asks Ringo for a test drive. On the way she finds out that Ikki never really changed.
8	"Trick:8"	Hajime Kamegaki	May 23, 2006
Ikki, Kazu and Onigiri are having trouble with schoolresults on school, they planned on stealing the answers of the exam. In the progress they hear the story from Mari Tomita, the homeroom teacher of Ikki, about the school clock that's been frozen at one minute before half nine.
9	"Trick:9"	Hiroyuki Fuse	May 30, 2006
With Buccha on Ikki's team they still have a problem with the requirement of the minimum of five players for making a team. With this goal they created a rather odd way of finding their fifth rider. Ringo later shows up with a poster showing an A-Class battle between Kintetsu Bulls and Agito's team. The group decides to watch the battle and are totally surprised at the outcome.
10	"Trick:10"	Michita Shiraishi	June 6, 2006
Not soon after they find themselves in a trap of Wind G-Men. With Ikki's group escaping from the hands of Kaito, Ikki drags Agito with him to the skies. "When a frog is born, it's not the sea it's looking forward to." "The sky..." This making Agito's soft alter-ego, Akito, return.
11	"Trick:11"	Hiroshi Kurimoto	June 20, 2006
Akito decided to join the team and now they can finally create their own storm rider team. The whole group is excited in the progress with picking a name, emblem, goal and type of team. With most of it decided and registered officially, they find out that another team has taken the school as their turf, a Storm Rider team called Sabel Tigers. Ikki decides to challenge them in a battle.
12	"Trick:12"	Shinichi Masaki	June 27, 2006
The Sabel Tigers had been able to acquire two wins after Bucca and Onigiri had messed up during the F-Class Parts War. In order to assist them from behind the scenes, Ringo disguises herself to race for Ikki's rising Kogasumaru team.
13	"Trick:13"	Hirotaka Marufuji	July 4, 2006
Encouraged by their first win over the Sabel Tigers] Ikki wants to further broaden his potential to be the best of the Storm Riders. However, he gets into trouble with Rika when she finds out that Ikki wants to be a Storm Rider himself. Ringo comes to Ikki's defense by insisting that Ikki has potential to be a Storm Rider over Rika's objections.
14	"Trick:14"	Yoshihiro Yamaguchi	July 11, 2006
Rika go sees her old boyfriend Sora, who had been crippled and became a wheelchair user after an unknown perpetrator had gravely injured most of her old Sleeping Forest teammates. When she and Sora find out that Ikki was overhearing their conversation, Sora and Rika tell Ikki of the latter's now growing hatred toward Air Trecks. In order to resolve their differences, Sora wagers a Parts War match between the Noyamono siblings against Sora, Ikki and the former's dogs Stone, Cold and Stunner.
15	"Trick:15"	Mamoru Hamatsu	July 18, 2006
Ikki and Rika engage each other in the Parts Wars with each other declaring their intent to win. Ikki eventually defeats Rika in the Parts War match and was the sole winner. Rika admits defeat and decides to help Ikki to further train him in the use of Air Trecks by strapping weights on his body. Ikki and the rest of Kogarasumaru, in their Spring Break, train together for the first time as a team in order to improve their Air Treck skills. Meanwhile, an unknown wave of AT Team disbandings were apparently being caused by Agito on his own during the Parts Wars between Ikki and Rika.
16	"Trick:16"	Kōnosuke Uda	July 25, 2006
While defeating another team, Agito is confronted by Croissant Mask (Ringo in disguise). Agito seems to have anticipated her arrival, and faces off against. Ringo then states that Agito was just defeating the east side teams for two reasons: to expand Kogarasumaru's area as quickly as possible, and for his own personal gain. She then warns him that she'll come if Agito tries to use Kogarasumaru again and leaves. Apparently, Agito can tell that Ringo is behind the mask. Once Ikki learns that Agito has been spreading their area he is elated. Later, they visit an arcade to play a punching bag game that Ikki has the highest score in. They come to see that one of the machines is broken with a punching score of 996, with Ikki's only being 496. The machine was broken by the leader of an extremely large D-Class team called Behemoth, whose name is Akira Udo. The guys find a weird looking elephant-bike, which belongs to Mitsuru Bondo, The Cyclops Hammer, one of the Behemoth's Holy Four. After brutally punching Onigiri for touching it, Ikki charges toward him only to have Ringo block his way, and Mitsuru giving him an onslaught of brutal attacks and knocking him back. Mitsuru even displays that his strength is so great that he could knock over 400+ pound Buccha like it was nothing. Back at home, Ringo, Ume, and Mikan confronts Agito about putting Ikki's team at risk (though Ringo apparently breaks her cover about being Croissant Mask). Agito then explains that he was luring Behemoth away from their home turf to Kogarasumaru's turf so they could have a Parts War. He also explains that since it is their turf, they'll have an F-Class Parts War, or Dash Parts War, which gives them a good advantage considering that Kazu, Croissant Mask, and Agito himself are extremely fast Riders. Ikki appears and refuses, though Agito has chosen the 5 riders and Ikki wasn't part of them. Meanwhile, Mitsuru meets up with two of the other Holy Four. THey comment that Kogarasumaru was unworthy of a challenge, though Mitsuru only did it to let Akira have a rematch against Agito, after his apparent loss. Later, the two teams meet, though Ikki messes up te plan by just challenging them to a fight. Mitsuru is infuriated and somewhat accepts, though this is interrupted by the unlikely appearance of Akira, who says that on the next full moon (10 days), they'll fight. About a week into it, they are doing training on close combat, with Agito being a drill sergeant. Agito leaves and meets up with the Wind G-Men. The team interrogates him the next morning, leaving with Akito giving them a quote. The 10 days pass, and the team meets up in Behemoth's hideout where all 1000+ members have shown up to watch the Holy Four fight Kogarasumaru.
17	"Trick:17"	Ken Andō	August 1, 2006
Ikki's team prepares to square off with Behemoth in a brutal Cube match, each of them going head to head with a single opponent. They better step it up - the audience is going to be huge.
18	"Trick:18"	Shigeharu Takahashi	August 8, 2006
The fight against Behemoth continues, and only Ikki and Agito remain in the game. While Ikki toys with his opponent, Agito competes with raw determination.
19	"Trick:19"	Hiroshi Kurimoto	August 15, 2006
The Cube match rages on! Ikki and Agito double-team their Behemoth opponents and gain the edge - until the Fang's Regalia change everything.
20	"Trick:20"	Shinichi Masaki	August 22, 2006
As the match rushes to an end, Ikki and Agito have to make their move quick and make it count - and then they better get out of there: not only is the Behemoth gang angry, but the cops are out in force!
21	"Trick:21"	Kazuyoshi Yokota	August 29, 2006
Kogarasumaru's rep is on the rise after defeating Behemoth. It hasn't been easy, but future victories might come easier if Ikki accepts Simca's offer to join forces.
22	"Trick:22"	Yoshikata Nitta	September 5, 2006
It's time for the school trip to Kyoto, but there's a problem − Akito can't afford it. Ikki's team will leave no man behind, so they set out to get some money from Kaito.
23	"Trick:23"	Makoto Tamagawa	September 12, 2006
Ikki finds his reputation precedes him in Kyoto: the top teams in the city are looking for a piece of the action, and they're not afraid to let Ikki know that there's going to be trouble.
24	"Trick:24"	Kenichi Maejima	September 19, 2006
With his friends used as bait, Ikki is lured to Trident's base. The gang gets what they wanted all along when Ikki issues a challenge − and the gang's leader accepts.
25	"Trick:25"	Hajime Kamegaki	September 26, 2006
After numerous attempts to complete the devil's thirty thirty, Ikki performs one final jump, reaching 35.09 m and beating the previous 34.2 m record set by Sora.

== DVD List ==
Volume	Date	Episodes
Volume 01: East Side Showdown	February 6, 2007	Tricks 1–4
Volume 02: Growing Wings	April 3, 2007	Tricks 5–8
Volume 03: A New Legacy	June 5, 2007	Tricks 9–12
Volume 04: Wings Reborn	August 7, 2007	Tricks 13–17
Volume 05: Battle of Kings	October 2, 2007	Tricks 18–21.5
Volume 06: Kill 'Em Dead	December 4, 2007	Tricks 22–25
The Complete Collection	December 2, 2008	Tricks 1-25
