= List of Save Me! Lollipop episodes =

Mamotte! Lollipop is a 2006 Japanese anime television series based on Michiyo Kikuta's manga series of the same name. The animated series was produced by Marvelous Entertainment and Sunshine Corporation under the direction of Noriyoshi Nakamura (中村憲由, Nakamura Noriyoshi) and consists of thirteen episodes. The story revolves around female protagonist Nina Yamada, a seventh grader who accidentally swallows the Crystal Pearl thinking it was candy. The pearl is the goal of a sorcery examination where the students must retrieve it to pass. But since Nina has swallowed the pearl, she is now the target. Two of the examinees decide to protect her from the other students while they work on a potion to extract the pearl from Nina.

The series was first broadcast on KAB between July and September 2006. The episodes were rebroadcast by Tokyo MX, KBS Kyoto, Sun Television, and several other stations within a few days of the initial broadcast.

Two pieces of theme music are used for the opening and closing of each episode. The opening theme is "Poppin' Heart ha Hitotsu Dake?" by Clover. The closing theme is "Kyun-Kyun-Panic" by MOSAIC.WAV.

On May 12, 2008, Funimation announced that it acquired Mamotte! Lollipop. Under the title Save Me! Lollipop, Funimation released the series as a single DVD box set on February 24, 2009.

== Episode list ==
No.	Title	Original release date
1	"The Princes Who Fell From the Sky!?"; Transliteration: "Sora Kara Futtekita Ouji-sama!?" (Japanese: 空から降ってきた王子様!?)	July 1, 2006
Nina Yamada is a seventh grader who is ready to fall in love with the ideal boy for her. One day, two boys from the magical world fall from the sky and explain that because she swallowed the Crystal Pearl used for a magic exam they participated in, they have to stay and protect her.
2	"Abruptly, May We Join You?!"; Transliteration: "Ikinari, Ojamashimāsu!?" (Japanese: いきなり、おジャマしまーす!?)	July 8, 2006
The two cute boys she met the other day, Zero and Ichii, transfer to her school and follow her everywhere, much to Nina's annoyance. When she leaves their sight, two examinees named San Sherard and Forte Sherard attack her, but Zero and Ichii come to her rescue.
3	"Kiss? Baby? Lollipop!?"; Transliteration: "Kisu? Baby? Lolipopp!?" (Japanese: キス? 赤ちゃん? ロリポップ!?)	July 15, 2006
Two new examinees named Rokka and Gou appear. Gou wishes to catch the Crystal Pearl but Rokka only cares about Ichii, even to the point of kissing him in public, but she gets angry when Ichii seems to favor Nina over her. Ichii tells Nina not to worry and gives her a lollipop which protects her.
4	"Exciting Hot Spring-Sexy Legend!?"; Transliteration: "Dokidoki Onsen Sexy Densetsu!?" (Japanese: ドキドキ温泉セクシー伝説!?)	July 22, 2006
Nina and the others go to the hot springs and the other examinees attempt to capture Nina using many crazy methods.
5	"San on July 17th" Transliteration: "7 Gatsu 17 Nichi no San" (Japanese: 7月17日のサン)	July 29, 2006
San and Forte go out shopping and remember when they first met. San had been accused of being a cursed child after her mother had an illness and was believed to have a strange power since birth. Forte befriends San shortly after they meet and tells her after her mother dies that he will always be besides her no matter what.
6	"The Mid-Term Test is a Disaster!?"; Transliteration: "Chuukanshiken wa dai Panic!?" (Japanese: 中間試験は大パニック!?)	August 5, 2006
Nina is captured by Will, an inspector of the magical exam, who tells the respectively partnered examinees that they must retrieve Nina from his clutches by sundown or they will all fail.
7	"The Summer Event is Super Stimulating!?"; Transliteration: "Natsu no Gyoji wa Chou Shigekiteki!?" (Japanese: 夏の行事は超シゲキ的!?)	August 12, 2006
Nanase and Yakumo come to retrieve the Crystal Pearl and decide to scare the other examinees in the haunted house, which is where Nina and the others go. It appears that Nanase and Yakumo respectively hold grudges against Zero and Ichii.
8	"Nina is Zero and Zero is Nina!?"; Transliteration: "Nina ga Zero de, Zero ga Nina!?" (Japanese: ニナがゼロで、ゼロがニナ!?)	August 19, 2006
Nina and Zero switch bodies after Nanase puts a spell on them and Nanase says if they do not hand over the Crystal Pearl, he will not undo the spell.
9	"Here Comes His Fiancée!?"; Transliteration: "Fianse, Arawaru!?" (Japanese: 婚約者、あらわる!?)	August 26, 2006
Zero's fiancée Kuku comes and attempts to have him come back home and marry her. He refuses and after Kuku sees him and Nina together, she decides to cast a spell on him and Nina, gradually turning them both into animals. Still refusing to marry her, Kuku decides to put a spell on the whole school until her partner Toto comes to stop her and tells her he has always loved her.
10	"Zero and Ichii - The Meeting and the Bond!"; Transliteration: "〜Zero & Ichii〜 Deai to Kizuna" (Japanese: 〜ゼロ&イチイ〜 出会いとキズナ)	September 2, 2006
Zero and Ichii explain how they first met and that Ichii was once a very bad person until he met Zero. It also shows Ichii used to love his stepsister, Sarasa who married Zero's older brother, Jeff.
11	"The Last Present!?"; Transliteration: "Saigo no Purezento!?" (Japanese: 最後のプレゼント!?)	September 9, 2006
Christmas has arrived and it is about time for Zero and Ichii to go, which makes Nina depressed. Zura, Ichii and Zero's assistant, says he can erase Nina's memories of all the fun times they had together if he uses her lollipop Ichii gave her but Nina decides that she wants to always be with them.
12	"Goodbye, My Wonderful Princes!"; Transliteration: "Sayonara Sutekina Oujisama" (Japanese: さよなら素敵な王子様)	September 16, 2006
As the magic exam comes to an end, after dealing with more examinees, Nina decides to let the Crystal Pearl free. However, things take an unexpected turn when it becomes a Black Pearl.
13	"Comeback! Save Me! Lollipop"; Transliteration: "Madotte! Mamotte! Roripoppu" (Japanese: もどって! まもって! ロリポップ)	September 23, 2006
Nina chooses to stay with Zero and Ichii and help them fight the Black Pearl, soon finding a way to overcome the battle. Nina is then undergoing training to become a sorcerer.
