= BabyFirst =

American TV channel

- Country: United States
- Broadcast area: United States; Canada
- Headquarters: Los Angeles, California, U.S.

Programming
- Languages: English, French, German, Hebrew, Mandarin, Portuguese, Spanish, Turkish
- Picture format: 1080i HDTV

Ownership
- Owner: First Media

History
- Launched: May 11, 2006; 20 years ago
- Former names: BabyFirstTV

Links
- Website: www.babyfirsttv.com

BabyFirst (stylized in all lowercase letters since 2019, also known as BabyFirstTV) is an American pay television channel producing and distributing content for babies and toddlers aged 0–3 years and their parents through the television, the internet, and mobile applications. The channel is owned by First Media US. The content is intended to develop an infant's skills, such as color recognition, counting and vocabulary.

The network is based in Los Angeles, California and is available in over 120 million homes in 33 countries and in 13 languages.

== History ==
=== Origins ===
BabyFirst was announced in 2004 by Guy Oranim and Sharon Rechter. The network was launched on May 11, 2006, on DirecTV and made available through EchoStar's Dish Network in June 2006. It is based in Los Angeles and was initially funded by Regency Enterprises, Kardan and Bellco Capital. The channel was controversial as the first 24-hour channel for children from six months to three years in age, but it was popular among parents and grew quickly.

=== Distribution expansion ===
In the 2000s, the Federal Trade Commission responded to a complaint by the Campaign for a Commercial Free Childhood alleging that BabyFirst's advertising that it helped babies develop skills was misleading. The FTC did not impose any sanctions.

By 2008, it was broadcasting in ten territories in the Asia Pacific, such as China and Korea. In October 2008, SingTel started distributing the channel to the Singapore audience. It was also being broadcast in Africa and Latin America. In May 2008, it signed a distribution agreement with Time Warner Cable. In 2009, HBO Asia became the exclusive distributor in Asia.

In 2011, the network obtained agreements to distribute the channel in the United Kingdom through the BSkyB satellite network as well as in Mexico through Sky Mexico and Cablevision. A French version was introduced with CanalSat in 2011. In late 2011, it had arranged broadcasting agreements throughout Europe, the Middle East, and Canada.

A bilingual Spanish and English channel, BabyFirst Americas, was launched with Comcast in 2012. A premium YouTube channel was introduced in June 2013.

=== Recent history ===
In 2013, former ABC Network President Steven McPherson and Rich Frank, the former chairman of Disney Channel became investors and board members as the company worked to develop new content and improve advertising revenues. In May 2014, BabyFirst and AT&T U-verse released a co-developed second-screen app for mobile devices for children to interact with the television programming through tablets or smartphones.

== Programming ==
The television channel provides 24-hour programming for babies. About 90 percent of the 90 shows it produces are original content created at its studios. Acquired programs include Mio Mao, Squeak!, Teletubbies, Bob the Builder, Timmy Time, and Word Party. The format of the network limits each of the network's presentations to three to five minutes of length that are either live-action or animated.

The New York Times described the content as "decidedly unhurried", making extensive use of bright colors and upbeat music. Programming development is said to be guided by child psychology experts and is designed to encourage a child's skills development, such as counting, vocabulary and color recognition. The channel logo in the corner changes colors to indicate the skills a segment is intended to develop: red for language skills, orange for socio-emotional skills, yellow for cognitive thinking, green for exposure to the world around them, blue for numbers, and pink for imagination, music and art skills. Late-night programming utilizes the main rainbow-colored logo, and is intended to viewers to sleep.

There are also 41 BabyFirst apps for mobile devices. An app available to AT&T U-verse viewers allows children to draw on a mobile device and have the drawing appear on the television screen.

Some experts argue that exposing children to television at such an early age is taking technology too far or that parents are using the channel as a digital babysitter. Parents, in turn, argue against that argument, claiming that experts have lost touch with the realities of raising a child. BabyFirst suggests the programming is intended to be watched by parents and their children together in an interactive way.
