= El Pequeño Héroe y El Tesoro de la Luz =

- Spanish: El Pequeño Héroe y El Tesoro de la Luz
- Genre: Adventure
- Screenplay by: Roberto Bayeto
- Story by: Roberto Bayeto
- Directed by: Alejandro Figueroa
- Creative director: Andrés Sanromán
- Opening theme: La fuerza está en ti
- Ending theme: Hijo del viento
- Composer: Claudio González
- Country of origin: Uruguay
- Original language: Spanish
- No. of seasons: 2
- No. of episodes: 30

Production
- Executive producer: Javier Figueroa
- Editors: Marcelo Berruti; Laura Pino; Andrés Sanromán; Luciano Teodoro
- Running time: 5 minutes
- Production company: Locomotion Audiovisual Company (formerly MTW Studios)

Original release
- Network: Canal 4 (Uruguay)
- Release: October 9, 2006 – August 9, 2007

The Little Hero and the Treasure of Light (Spanish: El Pequeño Héroe y el Tesoro de la Luz), also simply known as The Little Hero (Spanish: El Pequeño Héroe), is an Uruguayan animated series produced by MTW Studios and broadcast by Canal 4 (Uruguay) in 2006 that reimagined José Artigas along with his friends during his childhood.

== Premise ==
This animated series deals with the fictional childhood story of José Artigas together with his friends. In the first season the backstory focused on the search for a lost treasure from the shipwreck of the ship "Nuestra Señora de la Luz" (Spanish: Our Lady of Light). On the other hand, the plot of the second season follows the legend of the mythological creature Luison, a werewolf-like creature.

This series portrayed aspects such as the cultural and ethnic diversity of the Banda Oriental at that time, the political and economic interests of that period and depicted the proto-Uruguayan society of that era. In addition, it tried to spread the José Artigas' values as the main character and the idea that any child can be a hero without the necessity of superpowers.

== Characters ==
Artigas and his friends

- José Artigas, criollo boy and Uruguayan hero
- Yamandú, Charrúa boy
- Irupé, Charrúa girl
- François, French boy
- Amiri, Afro-Uruguayan boy

Other characters

- Tacuabé, Charrúa chief
- African prince

== Production ==
The production of the first season took 10 months at an estimated cost of USD 50,000. The traditional Disney-born 24-frame full animation technique was used as the animation method.

== Broadcast ==
This series consists of 22 5-minute episodes. It was aired in Channel 4 of Montevideo from 9 October 2006, three times a week in the morning and repeated in the afternoon and on Saturday morning. After public request, the broadcast format was changed after the first two weeks, since then broadcasting the previous episode and the current episode alongside each other, so the series broadcast was extended to twelve weeks from the original seven foreseen. The broadcast of the first season ended on 28 December 2006.

The second season aired from 18 June to 9 August 2007 with the same two-episodes per broadcast format.

== Awards ==
The series was awarded in 2006 with the La República newspapers' Tabaré Prize in the category of Special Award.

== Media and merchandising ==
Along with the broadcast of the animated series, merchandise of the series was put on sale, including a board game and a puzzle, a play, a story book with exercises. A DVD with the complete series and extras was also released.

== See also ==
- Television in Uruguay
- History of Uruguay
