= List of Kiba (TV series) episodes =

This is the list of episodes of the anime Kiba. The anime aired on TV Tokyo from April 5 to March 27, 2007.

== Episode list ==
No.	Title	Original release date
1	"Wind of Destiny"; Transliteration: "Unmei no Kaze" (Japanese: 運命の風)	April 2, 2006
In a city called "Calm", a boy named Zed disrupts his school. He's been smashing into doors all over town. He tells his sickly childhood friend, Noah, that he wants to leave Calm and that he feels, by breaking down some barrier, he will be able to. Zed visits his mother in the hospital. Though physically well, she seems to be mentally ill and does not recognize her son. After being apprehended by school officials at the hospital, Zed runs away only to be attacked by a strange man with horns on his shoulders. Just as he is about to be killed, Zed's mother intervenes and saves him, showing amazing physical prowess before chasing after the man. Zed continues running from the police, and when he is cornered, he sees a mysterious portal which he jumps into in order to escape. Meanwhile, an ambulance which is transporting Noah to the hospital due to his poor health, crashes, leaving Noah unconscious. However a mysterious group of people perform some sort of summoning ritual and Noah is seen vanishing through a portal similar to the one Zed entered.
2	"New World"; Transliteration: "Atarashii Sekai" (Japanese: 新しい世界)	April 9, 2006
Zed finds himself in another world, in the country of Templar. He meets a young girl named Roya and her elderly master, Zico, and learns about Shard Casters, who can use small shards as weapons to battle. He also learns that powerful shard casters can control spirits which can also assist shard casters in battle. Without meaning to, Zed finds himself in trouble with the law after running off to explore more of Templar, however, he escapes his holding cell and helps Roya, who was also imprisoned after trying to help him, escape. Master Zico manages to convince the Council, the group of powerful people who run Templar, to let the matter go without pressing charges. Later, Zed discovers that he possesses a very powerful fighting spirit, however, he is totally unable to control it.
3	"Those With Power"; Transliteration: "Chikara wo Motsumono-tachi" (Japanese: 力を持つ者たち)	April 16, 2006
Zed meets Dumas and Robès, the top non-sage Shard Casters in Templar. Robès is a snobby playboy aristocrat, while Dumas is a hard-working farmer who is training a young student named Mikki to be a shard caster. Dumas currently holds the title of Shard Champion of Templar, which he earned in a Joust where he battled other shard casters. This title means he is regarded as the strongest shard caster in all of Templar. Robès clearly dislikes Dumas and at a party he announces that he plans to defeat Dumas and take his title of Shard Champion. It is also revealed that Robès is secretly a thief called "No-Face" who steals both spirits and objects from townspeople.
4	"The Wind's Resolve"; Transliteration: "Kaze no Ketsui" (Japanese: 風の決意)	April 23, 2006
Zed desperately wishes to participate in the Joust, the annual fighting competition that decides the Shard Champion. Dumas, Robès, Mikki, and Roya all participate. When Mikki, who is entered in the Joust, expresses his fear of fighting a second round, Zed decides to switch clothes with him and fight in his place. He wins the first match and is about to fight against the snobby aristocrat Robès.
5	"The Nation of Sacred Law"; Transliteration: "Kairitsu no Kuni" (Japanese: 戒律の国)	April 30, 2006
The story changes perspectives. Noah, Zed's friend, is now the protagonist. Noah is also transported to the same world as Zed, but he ends up in a different country: Neotopia. There, he is taken in by a man named Carter and his wife. He also becomes close to Aisha and Keith, childhood friends of Carter's son, Gale. He helps Carter and the townspeople build a park for the children to play at. Gale returns from working with the military and when he discovers that his father was keeping Noah without having reported Noah's presence to the government, he declares it a violation of Neotopia's Absolute Law and executes his father, leaving Noah shocked.
6	"A Rushed Conclusion"; Transliteration: "Hayasugita Ketsumatsu" (Japanese: 早すぎた結末)	May 7, 2006
Gale plans to destroy the small village of Letto by sending its people to different towns. In order to save the place he has grown to love, Noah tries to persuade Gale to take him and not harm the village. Gale refuses, however, and Keith, who wants to fight back, strikes up a rebellion. Gale and Keith engage in a battle, but are interrupted by Aisha, who begs them to stop. Gale stabs Aisha, enraging Keith, who attacks him. Noah watches as both Gale and Keith strike final blows upon the other, killing each other. Suddenly, flames erupt around Noah, seemingly caused by some power he possesses. A dazed Noah carries the dying Aisha out of the flame. A portal opens up and he asks her to come with him away from Letto, but she refuses, saying it is her home. Noah leaves Letto through the portal and wakes up in another strange country, as Aisha is seen collapsed, presumably dead.
7	"Awakened Feelings"; Transliteration: "Mezameta Omoi" (Japanese: 目覚めた思い)	May 14, 2006
The story returns to Zed and his fight against Robès. Zed is unable to summon his spirit, and so, loses the battle. Robès continues to steal from the townspeople under the alias "No-Face". His butler begs him to stop and Robès agrees on the condition that he can do just one more heist. However, things take a turn for the unexpected when another No-Face appears and steals Zed's spirit, leaving Robès to take the blame for a crime he did not commit.
8	"Betrayers' Whereabouts"; Transliteration: "Uragiri no Yukue" (Japanese: 裏切りの行方)	May 21, 2006
Robès is locked up and his claims that there is another No-Face are ignored. Zed, however, realizes the veracity of his claim. He demands that Robès reveal the identity of the other No-Face. Instead, Robès tosses him a strange flower.
9	"After the Fight is Over"; Transliteration: "Tatakai no Ato" (Japanese: 戦いのあと)	May 28, 2006
Zed's spirit does not listen to Dumas, instead attacking the invaders. After the battle, Roya and Zed find a strange girl at the edge of the forest. She asks Zed to lend her his strength.
10	"The Lonely Princess"; Transliteration: "Kodokuna Ōjo" (Japanese: 孤独な王女)	June 4, 2006
Rebecca reveals that Zed's spirit is called "Amil Gaoul". Robès and a team are sent to find Dumas.
11	"Premonition of Conspiracy"; Transliteration: "Inbō no Yokan" (Japanese: 陰謀の予感)	June 11, 2006
Hugh succeeds in capturing Rebecca. Zed is furious but he joins Elda when Philip sends her on a mission.
12	"The Advance Towards Truth"; Transliteration: "Shinjitsu he no Zenshin" (Japanese: 真実への前進)	June 18, 2006
Elda takes Zed to a place where he can get a new and powerful spirit which he can control. At the castle, Rebecca is fearful of her new groom and runs out of the room. Hugh stops her from fleeing and implies in the ensuing conversation that her father is still alive. Zed receives a new spirit sword as well as a second spirit called Rambos.
13	"Hurtling Power"; Transliteration: "Shissōsuru Chikara" (Japanese: 疾走する力)	June 25, 2006
Rebecca decides to return to the castle, in hopes that she might see her father again. On the way, she and Roya are attacked by Elmeida and dragged back to castle. Zed goes off to rescue them. Meanwhile, Robès finally gets to fight Dumas.
14	"The Lure of Power"; Transliteration: "Chikara no Yūwaku" (Japanese: 力の誘惑)	July 2, 2006
Zed, Roya and Robès return to Templar. Mikki is depressed over the betrayal and death of his sensei. He has been trying to find work, since he must support himself now. Roya comes up with the idea of selling Mikki's tasty bread. When Robès sees the boy, he decides to give him a gift.
15	"Small Treasure"; Transliteration: "Chiisana Takaramono" (Japanese: 小さな宝物)	July 9, 2006
After Mikki attacks Roya, she and Zed go to Robès and then to Zico for information. It seems that Mikki is possessed by Slugna, his master's old spirit. Meanwhile, Noah prepares to leave Galba, Sagiri and the other nomads.
16	"Tragedy of a Race"; Transliteration: "Higeki no Tami" (Japanese: 悲劇の民)	July 16, 2006
Guzman shifts himself to Templar and asks Zed to return with him to Kalbu-hu, where Rebecca is leading a rebellion against invading Zymot forces. Zico forbids Zed to get involved.
17	"A Wish Unfulfilled"; Transliteration: "Todokanu Negai" (Japanese: 届かぬ願い)	July 23, 2006
The Zymot forces begin a full-fledged assault on Kalbu-hu. Kemp continues to argue for peace, while Guzman insists on fighting. Noah and Sagiri are being treated at a hospital in Neotopia. Diana tries to convince him to fight for the Neotopian government.
18	"The Prayer That Will Not Fade"; Transliteration: "Kienai Inori" (Japanese: 消えない祈り)	July 30, 2006
The people of Kalbu-hu awaken Pronimo, a spirit summoned by their collective unconscious. Hugh reveals a connection between it and the spirit he took from Rebecca.
19	"The Land of Darkness"; Transliteration: "Ankoku no chi" (Japanese: 暗黒の地)	August 6, 2006
Keith is on the run from the law. He's able to find a shifting shard, and he travels to Templar. Robès is called in to return the runaway to Neotopia, since Templar and it are allied. Robès, however, suggests Zed instead as an escort. The shifting goes wrong, and Roya, Zed and Keith land in Tusk, an ally of Zymot. Both Hugh and Noah go out to find them.
20	"Reunion"; Transliteration: "Saikai" (Japanese: 再会)	August 13, 2006
Roya is taken to the palace of Tusk to be used as a sacrifice. Keith finds Zed, and they go to save her. Meanwhile, Noah continues to search for Keith as Hugh searches for Zed.
21	"Irrepressible Feelings"; Transliteration: "Nuguenu Omoi" (Japanese: 拭えぬ思い)	August 20, 2006
Roya finds small tuskan protruding from her shoulder, indicating that she is from Tusk. She tries to ask Zico about it but becomes embarrassed. She trains vigorously for an upcoming tournament. Zed waits for arrangements to be made for his journey to Neotopia.
22	"Maze of Memories"; Transliteration: "Kioku no meiro" (Japanese: 記憶の迷路)	August 27, 2006
Ginga saves Roya twice, they end up being taken care of by a high-class Tuskian. Zed meets up with Roya and decide to stay. At a party celebrating Roya as the Tuskian's new foster daughter, she is told to go see her mother by a mysterious man. At the meeting place, someone shows up determined to kill Roya.
23	"Bonds"; Transliteration: "Kizuna" (Japanese: 絆)	September 3, 2006
Roya's family past is revealed. Zed, Roya, and Templar's spy get into a battle with the people who want to kill Roya. She is saved from her father by her mother. Zed and Roya return to Templar.
24	"The Yellow Shard of Happiness"; Transliteration: "Shiawase no kiiroi shādo" (Japanese: 幸せの黄色いシャード)	September 10, 2006
A bad gang comes for Robés and the butler says he will give them the family's secret yellow shard of Fortune in exchange if they let Robés off. But the three family maids are ambitious for happiness and steal the shard. Bad things happened when the shard granted them wishes. In the end it was a cursed shard and the bad guys were punished by Mikki.
25	"Prelude to Battle"; Transliteration: "Tatakai no josou" (Japanese: 戦いの序奏)	September 17, 2006
An inter-country joust is being held. Zed and Robes are nominated for Templar, Zed wishes to see Noah which is the main reason he agreed, Roya follows him to joust. Noah is competing in the Joust too, for Neotopia. Zed and Noah meet in Neotopia and chat for a long time as good friends, discussing what has happened and about key spirits.
26	"Lonely Memories"; Transliteration: "Kodoku na kioku" (Japanese: 孤独な記憶)	September 24, 2006
The episode recaps Noah's time in Neotopia. This involves both events when his spirit, Sachura, involuntarily released and caused destruction around him, thus causing him to fear his power. It also incorporates Noah's inclusion into Neotopia as its "Savior".
27	"Warriors"; Transliteration: "Senshi-tachi" (Japanese: 戦士たち)	October 1, 2006
During the Joust, Zed must combat everyone from old opponents to the strange technologists from Ulvarx, who possess wicked devices that are able to defeat even the most powerful spirits.
28	"Proof of Existence"; Transliteration: "Sonzai no Akashi" (Japanese: 存在の証)	October 8, 2006
When Zed shows just how powerful a shardcaster he is, the Neotopian leader Hyrum tries to enlist him in his campaign for global domination.
29	"Friendship at Cross-Purposes"; Transliteration: "Surechigau Yūjō" (Japanese: すれ違う友情)	October 15, 2006
When Roya is arrested by the Neotopian soldiers, Zed discovers his friend Noah is very different from the person he thought he knew.
30	"Showdown"; Transliteration: "Taiketsu" (Japanese: 対決)	October 22, 2006
Zed and Noah face each other in the Joust and Noah shows just how mercilessly he can wield his new powers.
31	"The Cost of Ambition"; Transliteration: "Yabō no Daishō" (Japanese: 野望の代償)	October 29, 2006
After defeating Zed, Noah stops an attempt on Hyrum's life. He then unmasks Hugh, and defeats him. The final victor, he vows a rematch with Zed.
32	"The Nation's Agenda"; Transliteration: "Kokka no Omowaku" (Japanese: 国家の思惑)	November 5, 2006
Assassination attempts on Hyrum continue, as Noah and Zed become pawns in the political game of cat-and-mouse between warring nations.
33	"Lost Luster"; Transliteration: "Ushinawareta Kagayaki" (Japanese: 失われた輝き)	November 12, 2006
An Ulvarx faction reveals a technological advantage over Hyrum and Neotopia, and they intend to use this to end Hyrum's reign. But they need Zed and they try to persuade him to join their cause.
34	"War Breaks Out"; Transliteration: "Makiokoru Senka" (Japanese: 巻き起こる戦火)	November 19, 2006
Noah and Kira are sent to take out Zed and the Ulvarx assassins. Preparation is made for a celebration in Neotopia. Meanwhile, Zymot and Tusk reveal their alliance for the first time: in an attack on Neotopia.
35	"The Ones Who are Sacrificed"; Transliteration: "Ikenie to narumono" (Japanese: 生贄となる者)	November 26, 2006
Zed and Noah fight all four of Nudyu's spirits. When Zed is to take a hit from one of Nudyu's spirits Noah steps in the way and takes the hit for him. Before Zed can see if Noa is alright Noah gets up and heads towards the city which is now under attack. Can Noah get back in time to save the city?
36	"Wings Reborn"; Transliteration: "Yomigaeru Tsubasa" (Japanese: よみがえる翼)	December 3, 2006
The war continues. Sagiri befriends a beastman from Tusk who saved her life. Helic gets a hold of and releases Ex-Machina, a composite spirit but who does he run into when he shifts to Neotopia? Noah confronts Hugh in battle, but how are they brought together? And can Zed finally summon Amil Gaoul again?
37	"The Fall of the Capital"; Transliteration: "Shuto Kanraku" (Japanese: 首都陥落)	December 10, 2006
The three key spirits are having trouble bringing down Ex-Machina; that is, until Amil Gaoul changes his form again. Noah and Zed are captured by Hugh as they are being distracted by the condition of Zed's hand. Roya decides to go to Neotopia to help, and Hugh infiltrates the throne room of the capital!
38	"Endless Battle"; Transliteration: "Owarinaki Tatakai" (Japanese: 終わりなき戦い)	December 17, 2006
Zico arrives in Neotopia to help out Hyrum despite his ban. Hyrum reveals Noah is to receive another key spirit(Monadi), if they can find it. And hostages are brought in by Hugh, who will return them if he gets Hyrum's head.
39	"Epiphany"; Transliteration: "Kaigan" (Japanese: 開眼)	December 24, 2006
Fuelled by his anger at Hugh's continual massacre of innocent people, Zed called forth Amil Gaoul to fight Pronimo as he duels Hugh.
40	"Sought-After Power"; Transliteration: "Nerareta Chikara" (Japanese: 狙われた力)	January 7, 2007
With Neotopia fallen, Tusk now shifts its attention (and forces) to Ulvarx, determined to bring Ulvarx's technologies to Tusk's side.
41	"The Thought that Possessed Him"; Transliteration: "Torawareta omoi" (Japanese: 囚われた思い)	January 14, 2007
Ginga has returned to the Ulvarx with Zed and Roya only to find that Professor Bender has given up the lab to Tusk. Now things have changed and Zed, Roya, and Ginga are on the run from the Tusk army. In a safe spot Ginga reveals his past then goes to face Dukeham while Zed and Roya go deal with Professor Bender. Can Zed and Roya stop the mad Professor and can Ginga defeat Dukeham?
42	"A Small Savior"; Transliteration: "Chiisana Kyūseishu" (Japanese: 小さな救世主)	January 21, 2007
Sagiri is on board the Seeker ship. Since she is one of them they put her through the test to see if she is their savior which can only be confirmed by the acceptance of the key spirit(Shadin). Meanwhile, someone has broken into Templar. Who has managed to break into the Templar base?
43	"Truth Made Known"; Transliteration: "Akasareta Shinjitsu" (Japanese: 明かされた真実)	January 28, 2007
Zed's Mother, Sara has appeared and she seems to be fighting Zico. We go back in time to discover the relationship between Sara and Zico. Why has Zed's mother appeared and what could she want?
44	"An Unbreakable Spell"; Transliteration: "Tokenai Jubaku" (Japanese: 解けない呪縛)	February 4, 2007
Zed's Mother, Sara is defeat by Sagiri's key spirit, Shadin. Sara manages to escape. After the fight Zed tries to pursue his mother but is prevented in doing so by Zico. Zed is now imprisoned in the Templar base. Will Zed be able to save his mother from her inner demons?
45	"The Girl Confined to the Castle"; Transliteration: "Rōjyō no Shōjo" (Japanese: 籠城の少女)	February 11, 2007
Zed decides to go off with Sagiri and the Seekers to learn about his Mother and his Father. Meanwhile, in Tusk, Molima decides she wants to test Mirred to see if she is Tusk's savior. If Mirred makes it back to the palace alive then Molima will accept her as Tusk's savior. Can Mirred make it back alive and who was Zed's father?
46	"To the Land Where the Decisions Will Be Made"; Transliteration: "Ketsudan no chi e" (Japanese: 決断の地へ)	February 18, 2007
Lord Dolga is accepted among the Tusk leaders but Molima wants to prove he is worthy by fighting her. Out in Tusk Gitra prepares to take Mirred back to the palace. Back in Templar Roya waits for Zed to return. Will Zed return to Templar?
47	"A Savior Adrift"; Transliteration: "Mayoeru Kyūseishu" (Japanese: 迷える救世主)	February 25, 2007
Zed and Lord Dolga begin their battle. As the battle progress' Zed figures out that Dolga is actually Noah. Since Amil Gaoul is defeating Sachura with ease, Xeem steps in and releases Pronimo and Monadi to make the battle go in the favor of Dolga. With no choice Zed releases Shadin. Becoming impatient Xeem begins to attack Zed while he fights Dolga(Noah). With Zed defeated Xeem takes his Key Spirits. Now with four of the Key spirits all Xeem has to do now is get Sachura from Dolga and find Mirred. Can Zed stop him?
48	"Advent"; Transliteration: "Kōrin" (Japanese: 降臨)	March 4, 2007
Tusker is now effect inside the spirit to control the spirits inside. Noah and Zed had lost their spirits. But the Tusker has a significant effect on their resurrection.
49	"Mother and Child"; Transliteration: "Haha to Ko" (Japanese: 母と子)	March 11, 2007
Zed's mother has followed him to a floating isle in Tusk. Overwhelmed by her desire to once again possess Amil Gaoul, she would do anything just to have that great power, but for what reason? Her endless pursuit seemed to have blinded her from her true purpose—to protect her precious son. It is this realization that allowed her to pass away in peace.
50	"An Eternal Bond"; Transliteration: "Eien no Kizuna" (Japanese: 永遠の絆)	March 18, 2007
Noah summons Tusker once again, but it's still in its incomplete form; meanwhile, a possessed Noah fights Zed as the four realms (Templar, Tusk, Neotopia, and Zymot) experience unprecedented turmoils in the form of meteors and earthquakes as they draw near to each other.
51	"To Where the Wind Blows"; Transliteration: "Kazefuku basho he" (Japanese: 風吹く場所へ)	March 25, 2007
The episode starts with Zed getting enveloped in Tusker's power; Tusker releases himself and uses Zed's body and spread his wings to reveal his true form. While Zed is inside the endless abyss in Tusker getting lectured about how humans are bad because they want power, all the spirits get released. In the end Tusker is defeated, spirits go back to where they came from, Zed tries to attack Amil Gaoul but ends up shifting and merging with Amil Gaoul and gets transported to Calm where the city's wind has returned. Zed then says, "Let's go, Amil Gaoul," and he flies away.
