= List of We Were There episodes =

The episodes of the Japanese anime series We Were There, based on the manga series of the same name by Yuki Obata, was directed by Akitaro Daichi and produced by ArtLand.

== Episodes ==
No.	Title	Original release date
1	"Episode One" (Japanese: 第1話)	July 3, 2006
Nanami Takahashi begins her second day at her new high school, making two new friends in her class, like the shy Yuri. A girl from Asahi Middle School tells her about guy named Motoharu Yano, who was very popular with the girls and happens to be in the same class. Yuri explains that she hates Yano, which shows Nanami's interest until she develops a crush on him.
2	"Episode Two" (Japanese: 第2話)	July 10, 2006
On a class trip, Yuri gets sick while Nanami and Yano have a conversation about his past. Rumors begin begun spreading about Yano going out with Yuri's older sister and all the girls are now interested in it. One of the girls in their class brings an old year book and even Nanami has acquired an interest in it. However, Nanami she is caught looking at the Asahi year book by Yano. Without thinking, Nanami admits to him but she does not receive an entirely clear response. As a result, the beginning of an inner struggle stirring up much self-consciousness in Nanami.
3	"Episode Three" (Japanese: 第3話)	July 17, 2006
The class goes to school for the play rehearsals during summer vacation, but Nanami has been looking forward to going back to school and she gets pretty annoyed that Motoharu does not turn up to any of them, she wanted to see him. Even at the summer festival, where all the girls including Nanami dress up, he does not listen so Nanami gets the idea to go to his house and see him. Yano catches her battling with herself over whether or not to ring the doorbell. Once inside, Nanami and Yano reminisce on his past with his late ex-girlfriend.
4	"Episode Four" (Japanese: 第4話)	July 24, 2006
The Cultural Festival that all of them have been rehearsing for is approaching, and all students are working hard to prepare for the event. Meanwhile, Yano seems to be fairly distant with Nanami and she does not understand why, causing her to show great concern. On the day of the Cultural Festival, everything goes well with the play being successful. A tradition at the Festival is for young lovers to confess their love for one another, so Yano takes the opportunity to confesses his love for Nanami.
5	"Episode Five" (Japanese: 第5話)	July 31, 2006
Following Motoharu's confession during the Cultural Festival, Nanami is so thrilled from the kiss that she could not sleep at all last night. Due to this, Nanami has a hard time keeping up with all of the upcoming events. Yano helps her to remember everything by making her repeat after him. He casually slips in a movie date for the two of them without Nanami noticing. Shortly afterwards, upon noticing, Namami feels such relief that she sleeps the rest of day. Thankfully, Yano went in her place and sorted out everything. Afterwards, they go on a date to the movies and hold hands. As the seasons change, Nanami begins thinking about what to give Yano for Christmas.
6	"Episode Six" (Japanese: 第6話)	August 7, 2006
Nanami is thinking about the things she enjoyed with Motoharu but "crossing the line" is the one thing she still cannot do. The pair meets to go shopping, when they run into a store clerk which turns out to be Takeuchi's older sister. While waiting for Nanami after school, Motoharu has an appointment with Yuri.
7	"Episode Seven" (Japanese: 第7話)	August 14, 2006
Yano asks Nanami out on a date, but she ignores him to spend time with her friends when instead she secretly went to buy him a present, but it isn't much of a secret because he follows her. Yano gets concerned because she lied about where she was going and his friend Takeuchi was there to help. The next day, Yano is mad at her but they reconcile after exchanging gifts. In class, there is a seating change and this causes Nanami to question even more.
8	"Episode Eight" (Japanese: 第8話)	August 21, 2006
Nanami invites Yano to her house so they can spend time together. Initially, Yano rejects because her mother will be there, but once in her room, Nanami uses this opportunity to ask Yano about his past with Yuri. As Yano leaves, Nanami feels reassured with what he told her but still has the notion that it may not be the entire truth in the back of her head. Nanami also discovers the truth through the rumors at school, then she and Yano discuss that the past does not matter as long as they have the present together. The subject of having sex together keeps coming up and in the end, Nanami agrees to it.
9	"Episode Nine" (Japanese: 第9話)	August 28, 2006
All alone with Motoharu at his house, Nanami actually suggests that they finally "do it". Although it seems like such a dream, that dream is cut short when Motoharu's mother returns home and they are forced to ends things there. As a result, he decides save up money so that the same thing will not happen.
10	"Episode Ten" (Japanese: 第10話)	September 4, 2006
Nanami accidentally steals an old picture of Motoharu together with Nana from Yuri's bag, as she does not know what to do about it. However, Motoharu finds the picture in Nanami's notebook and decides to return it to Yuri. Since then, there has been some friction between Nanami and Motoharu and she is invited to Takeuchi's birthday.
11	"Episode Eleven" (Japanese: 第11話)	September 11, 2006
Nanami and Motoharu's study session in interrupted when Yuri turns up on Motoharu's doorstep, with something to tell him about her sister. Afterwards, the couple end up fighting about it.
12	"Episode Twelve" (Japanese: 第12話)	September 18, 2006
In an unconventional way, Motoharu finally confesses to Nanami, the sin he committed to Yuri. Since then, Nanami has not been able to face him, but they eventually fix the problem in their relationship. With things looking good for the couple, they decide to spend time on the beach.
13	"Episode Thirteen" (Japanese: 第13話)	September 25, 2006
After one week has passed without a word between them, the relationship between Nanami and Motoharu has ended. Takeuchi just cannot sit back at let things continue as they are, so he invites Nanami over to cheer her up. Motoharu begins to regret what happened between him and Nanami.
14	"Episode Fourteen" (Japanese: 第14話)	October 2, 2006
With things going nowhere between Motoharu and Nanami, Takeuchi cannot hold back his feelings and decides to take the initiative. Nonetheless, he has timed this wrong and Motoharu wants to stop him before it's too late.
15	"Episode Fifteen" (Japanese: 第15話)	October 9, 2006
Preparations for the annual Cultural Festival are progressing well, but Motoharu is trying to organize his feelings for Nanami and Nana, while Takeuchi is planning to settle things soon. On the day of the Cultural Festival, Nanami meets Takeuchi's sister.
16	"Episode Sixteen" (Japanese: 第16話)	October 16, 2006
During the night of School Festival, everyone is waiting for the main event impatiently. Takeuchi plans to confess to Nanami, so does Motoharu, but Nanami does not feel like she can handle all this now and decides to escape from giving her answer.
17	"Episode Seventeen" (Japanese: 第17話)	October 23, 2006
After the school festival, Nanami decides to get back together with Motoharu, but under the condition that he tells her all about his first love, Nana. In order to get Motoharu to spill, the couple go out on a date with Nanami bringing Takeuchi. Instead of learning something about Nana, Motoharu ends up telling her about his late father.
18	"Episode Eighteen" (Japanese: 第18話)	October 30, 2006
Motoharu decides to tell Nanami about Nana, causing it to quickly becoming a date when they go to see a movie to pass the time. Afterwards, things go wrong as Motoharu finally decides to open up, but it may not entirely be what Nanami wants to hear.
19	"Episode Nineteen" (Japanese: 第19話)	November 6, 2006
Nanami finally accepts Motoharu's request to get back together and they return to their normal school lives. However, things are still not settled between Motoharu and Takeuchi because there is a rivalry between them.
20	"Episode Twenty" (Japanese: 第20話)	November 13, 2006
Takeuchi is forced to go along on a double date with his classmate at school. During the date, Takeuchi accepts the girl's confession and they start going out, but Motoharu is angry at him because he dislikes her. On Sunday, Motoharu goes out on a date with Nanami to spend the day having fun.
21	"Episode Twenty-One" (Japanese: 第21話)	November 20, 2006
Nanami's parents are going to a wedding on the weekend, so she takes this opportunity to invite Motoharu to sleepover. Motoharu is pretty excited about the whole thing when he suddenly receives a call from an upset Yuri. However, instead of meeting up with Nanami, he goes to be the one at Yuri's side. Meanwhile, Takeuchi is on a date but he cannot seem to get Nanami of his mind.
22	"Episode Twenty-Two" (Japanese: 第22話)	November 27, 2006
Knowing that Nanami is left, hopelessly waiting for Motoharu, Takeuchi gives in to his feelings and goes to her to take her home. Motoharu can finally approach Nanami but it is too late. At school, Motoharu tries to apologize but then as he is rejected he collapses from a cold. Even with things as there are between them, Nanami is still worried about Motoharu and goes to visit but then Yuri walks out of his house.
23	"Episode Twenty-Three" (Japanese: 第23話)	December 4, 2006
Motoharu tells Takeuchi that his mother is divorcing and will move to Tokyo. Takeuchi feels to tell Motoharu that he confessed his feelings to Nanami. Nanami is not sure of what to do about her relationship with Motoharu, as that has happened with Takeuchi and Yuri.
24	"Episode Twenty-Four" (Japanese: 第24話)	December 11, 2006
With Christmas approaching, Nanami is still worrying about a present despite not having made up with Motoharu. Still worrying about his mother, Motoharu is even considering moving with her.
25	"Episode Twenty-Five" (Japanese: 第25話)	December 18, 2006
Nanami worried about the entrance exams she has herself into, so in order to raise the chance of being accepted, she begins studying alone. Moreover, Motoharu still has not given Nanami an answer as to whether he would move with his mother or stay.
26	"Episode Twenty-Six" (Japanese: 第26話)	December 25, 2006
Christmas is only a few weeks away, but Nanami and Motoharu may not be able to spend it together as he has decided to move with his mother to Tokyo. Although he wants to spoil her during the days they have, Nanami wants to spend those like they usually do.
