= Sudsakorn (disambiguation) =

Sudsakorn is a fictional character originally from the Thai epic Phra Aphai Mani.

Sudsakorn may also refer to:

== People ==
- Sudsakorn Sor Klinmee (born 1986), Thai Muay Thai fighter
- Nilmungkorn Sudsakorn Gym, Thai Muay Thai fighter

== Media ==
- The Adventure of Sudsakorn, a 1979 Thai animated film
- The Legend of Sudsakorn, a 2006 Thai live-action fantasy film
