= Luduan =

Chinese mythological beast

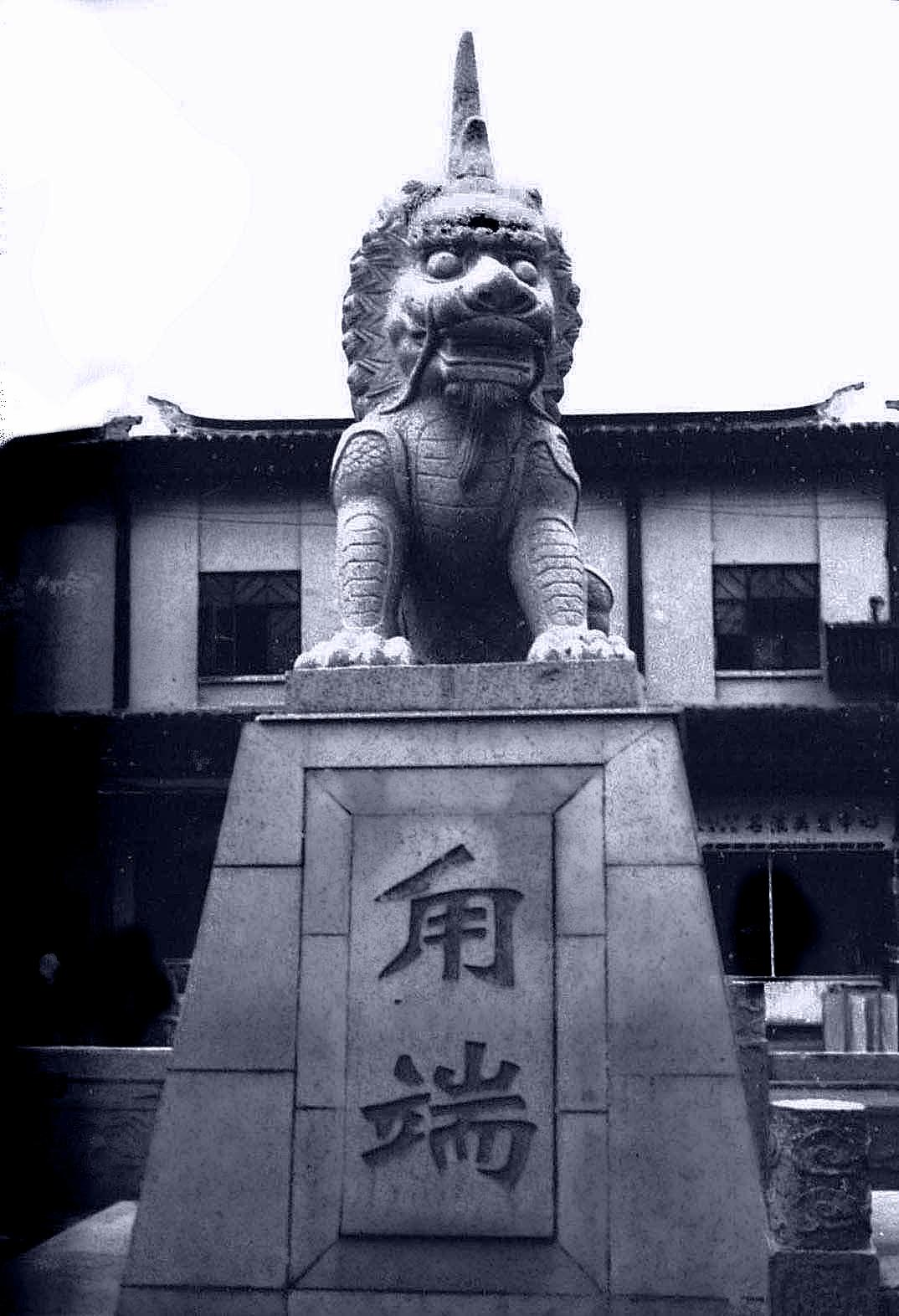
Luduan Statue in Luzhi

Luduan (甪端 pinyin: lùduān) is a legendary Chinese auspicious creature. It has the head of a lion, the horn of a rhino, the body of a dragon, the paws of a bear, the scales of a fish, and the tail of an ox, It can travel 18,000 li (9000 km or 5500 mi) in a single day and speaks all world languages. It appears during the reign of enlightened rulers. A legend says a luduan once appeared to Genghis Khan and convinced him to abandon his efforts to conquer India. The throne of the Emperor in the Hall of Supreme Harmony has two incense burners shaped like the luduan as an auspicious symbol.

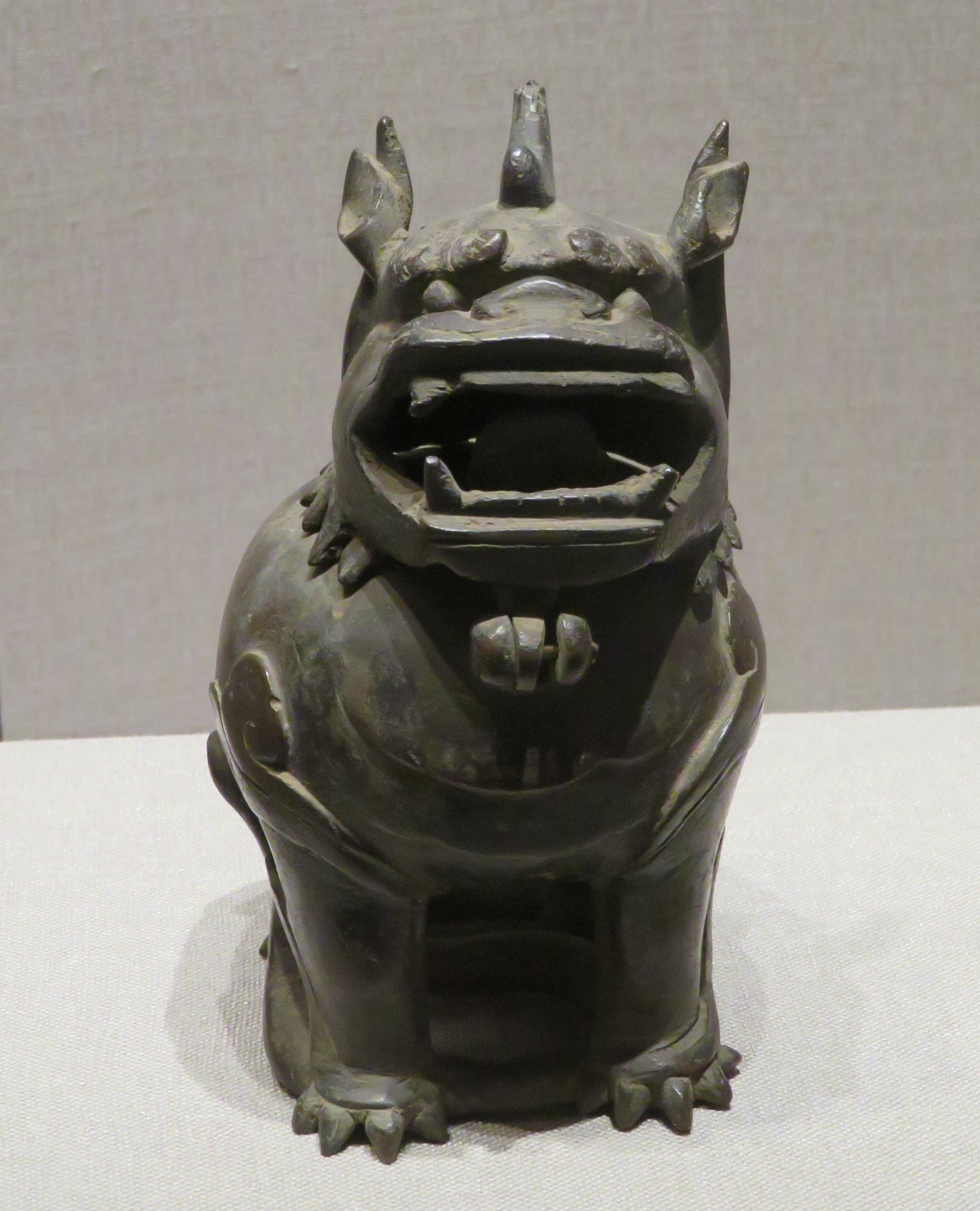
Incense burner in shape of a Luduan

== See also ==
- Qilin — another Chinese unicorn.
- Xiezhi — a legendary creature able to detect truth
- Sin-you — a Japanese legendary creature able to detect truth
