= Payut Ngaokrachang =

Thai cartoonist and animator

- ปยุต เงากระจ่าง
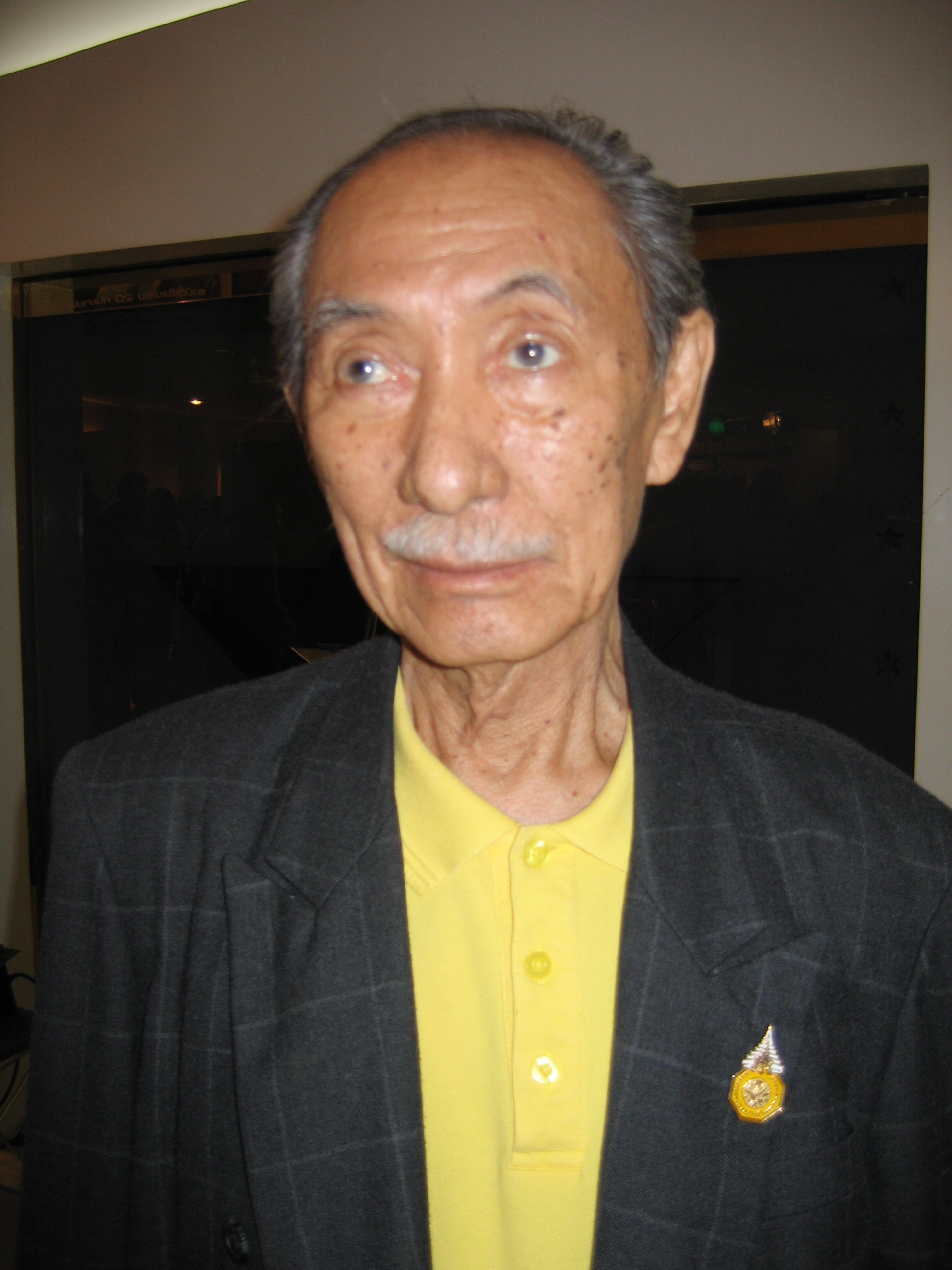
- Payut at the Cherd Songsri Retrospective in September 2007 in Bangkok
- Born: 1 April 1929; Prachuap Khiri Khan, Thailand
- Died: 27 May 2010 (aged 81); Bangkok, Thailand
- Known for: Cartoonist; animator; film director; teacher
- Notable work: The Adventure of Sudsakorn

Payut Ngaokrachang (Thai: ปยุต เงากระจ่าง, April 1, 1929 – May 27, 2010) was a Thai cartoonist and animator. He created Thai cinema's first cel-animated feature film, The Adventure of Sudsakorn.

== Biography ==
=== Early life ===
Payut was born at Klong Warl village, Warkoe, Prachuap Khiri Khan Province. As a child, Payut was interested in nang drama (shadow-puppet plays) and Felix the Cat.

In 1944, he enrolled in classes to become an art teacher. Payut studied by correspondence with illustrator Hem Vejakorn, whose work was seen on the covers of 10-satang pulp novels. Through their letters back and forth, Hem introduced Payut to drawing.

"I had been a fan of Khru (teacher) Hem’s drawings since 1944, when I was 14. So, I wrote him asking to become his student. He was a great teacher and taught me a lot, from how to draw anatomy to getting the right perspective on paintings. I learned all this from his letters," Payut told The Nation newspaper in a 2004 interview.

At age 17, Payut took his first job painting backgrounds for play sets as he traveled around Thailand with theater groups. Payut also worked as a block printer, making etchings, and was employed at an advertising agency.

=== Inspiration as animator ===
One of Payut's influences was artist Sanae Klaikluen, whom Payut had met in 1941. Sanae was interested in animation and wanted Payut to join him in a project. Sanae was commissioned in 1945 to make a one-minute animated film for the Thai government, which was campaigning to get citizens to wear hats and farmers to wear boots. Sanae died a year later, and it was then that Payut decided he wanted to be an animator.

In 1955, while he was recovering from an illness, Payut set about animating a cartoon he had been drawing for a newspaper. In the cartoon, Miracle Happens (เหตุมหัศจรรย์ Het Mahatsachan), a policeman directs traffic, swaying to the tune of music in the manner of Thai classical dancers. A woman starts crossing the street when the zipper on her dress splits, diverting the policeman's attention with the result that cars pile up all around him.

The 12-minute short premiered on July 5, 1955, at Sala Chalermthai Theater.

=== Work for USIS ===
The acclaim that accompanied Payut's "Hollywood-like" animated short caught the attention of the US embassy in Bangkok, which led to his hiring by the United States Information Service, where he worked for nearly 33 years as an artist.

For training, the USIS gave Payut a choice of spending six to eight months with Disney or going to Japan. He chose Japan, where he has said he "just looked around, as animation did not exist there at the time." (See History of anime).

Payut, in association with the newly formed Toei Animation, only made one animated film for the USIS, a 20-minute recounting of the story of Hanuman, the white monkey in the classic Ramayana. Made in 1957, it was called Hanuman in Danger (หนุมานเผชิญภัย Hanuman Phachoen Phai). It was a propaganda work, with a red monkey representing communism.

In 1960, he created a short cartoon called A Boy and A Bear (เด็กกับหมี Dek Kap Mi) for the Southeast Asia Treaty Organization, which called for unity in order to combat communism.

He also worked part-time jobs making animated commercials.

=== The Adventure of Sudsakorn ===
The Adventure of Sudsakorn is Thailand's first cel-animated feature film.

While keeping his day job at the USIS, Payut began work in 1976 on The Adventure of Sudsakorn, featuring a character from one of Thailand's most famous literary works, Phra Aphai Mani by the poet Sunthorn Phu. Sudsakorn, the boy hero, is the son of a mermaid and a wandering musician-prince, and his adventures include fights with an elephant, a shark, a dragon horse, as well as encounters with a king, a hermit, a yogi, a magic wand and ghosts.

The 82-minute feature was released on Songkran Day, April 13, 1979.

The production was plagued with shortages of capital, personnel and equipment. For the first six months, the crew had 100 workers, but by the second year their numbers were reduced to nine.

"I made a lot of my equipment from pieces I got from junk of World War II military surplus", Payut told writer John A. Lent. "I'd find a screw here, a crank there, etc. I used a combat camera and adapted it. I pulled together pieces of wood, aluminum, whatever I could find."

The intense, detailed work on Sudsakorn impaired his eyesight. "I did all the key drawings myself, even the layout and design ... I was almost blind from doing that film and now I wear contacts. My right eye is long, my left is short, crooked because of all that detailed work."

=== Later work ===
Payut's attempts to make more animated features were rebuffed due to cost overruns. Hence, his next animated film was not made until 1992, when he was subsidized by the Japanese government to make a film for educating girls under the title My Way. He had also been a guest lecturer on animation at many universities before his death in Bangkok on 27 May 2010.

The Adventure of Sudsakorn is occasionally screened at film and animation festivals around the world.

== Legacy ==
The Thai Short Film & Video Festival has the Payut Ngaokrachang prize for animation. The award is a medallion designed by Payut.

While feature-length animated features are rare in the Thai film industry since The Adventure of Sudsakorn, animation is widely used in Thai television series and in commercials. A 3D animated Sudsakorn series is one such show.

In 2006, Thailand's first computer-animated feature film, Khan Kluay, about King Naresuan the Great's war elephant, was released. It was directed by Kompin Kemgunerd, who worked on various Disney features such as Atlantis: The Lost Empire and Tarzan, and Blue Sky Studios' Ice Age. Although the work was mostly done on computers, Kompin faced many of the same difficulties in funding and human resources that Payut faced.

A second traditionally animated feature, The Life of Buddha, produced by Wallapa Pimthong, was released on December 5, 2007.

In 2017, he was featured as a Google Doodle on what would have been his 88th birthday.
