= Ki-lin =

- Qilin, a mythical Chinese dragon.
- Jilin, a province in the north east of China.
