= Sudsakorn =

Thai fictional character

Sudsakorn (Thai: สุดสาคร, RTGS: Sutsakhon, pronounced [sùt.sǎː.kʰɔ̄ːn]) is a fictional character in Sunthorn Phu's story Phra Aphai Mani, written in Thailand during the Rattanakosin period. Sudsakorn, the son of Phra Aphaimani and a mermaid, was born at Ko Kaeo Phitsadan (เกาะแก้วพิสดาร, Magical Island) without ever having seen his father. His adventure begins after he grows up and begins his quest for his father. The story incorporates much of the hero's journey narrative archetype.

== Synopsis ==
On a magical island called "Ko Kaeo Phitsadan" (เกาะแก้วพิสดาร), a mermaid gives birth to a child named "Sudsakorn" (สุดสาคร) which means "the edge of the sea". The boy is reared by an old and wise hermit who eventually helps his mentee rescue his father from a yakṣī called "Nang Phisueasamut" (นางผีเสื้อสมุทร).

The boy soon begins a quest for his father, Phra Aphaimani (พระอภัยมณี), and so he begs the hermit to teach him martial arts to protect himself from the dangers along the way. The hermit does so and also gives Sudsakorn a special gift, a flying horse-like creature called Maninmangkorn (ม้านิลมังกร, jet dragon horse), to shorten his journey. After leaving the island, this creature and the boy are lured into a haunted island by evil spirits and become lost. They fight for several hours and escape various threats.

Later in their journey, they encounter a nudist who steals Maninmangkorn and attempts to kill the boy by pushing him over a cliff. Sudsakorn unexpectedly survives the fall and sets out to retrieve Maninmangkorn. He hunts down the nudist and engages him successfully in combat. Sudsakorn is so successful that it draws the attention of a king, who decides to adopt him.

Time passes and Sudsakorn, having grown bigger and stronger, continues his quest for his father, with the help of his newly acquired brothers who board ships to follow Sudsakorn to the sea. During the second journey, a large group of giant butterflies suddenly attack the boys and capture Sudsakorn’s brothers before carrying them to an island. Sudsakorn follows the butterflies to the island and kills the insects. He proceeds to rescue his brothers and discovers his long-lost father in the process.

== In popular media ==
- The Legend of Sudsakorn, a 2006 Thai live-action fantasy film.
- Sudsakorn, an animated TV series aired on Channel 7 beginning from 2002.
- The Adventure of Sudsakorn, a 1979 Thai animated film.

== See also ==
- Qilin, a similar horse-like dragon in Chinese mythology.
