= Qilin =

Legendary creature in Chinese mythology

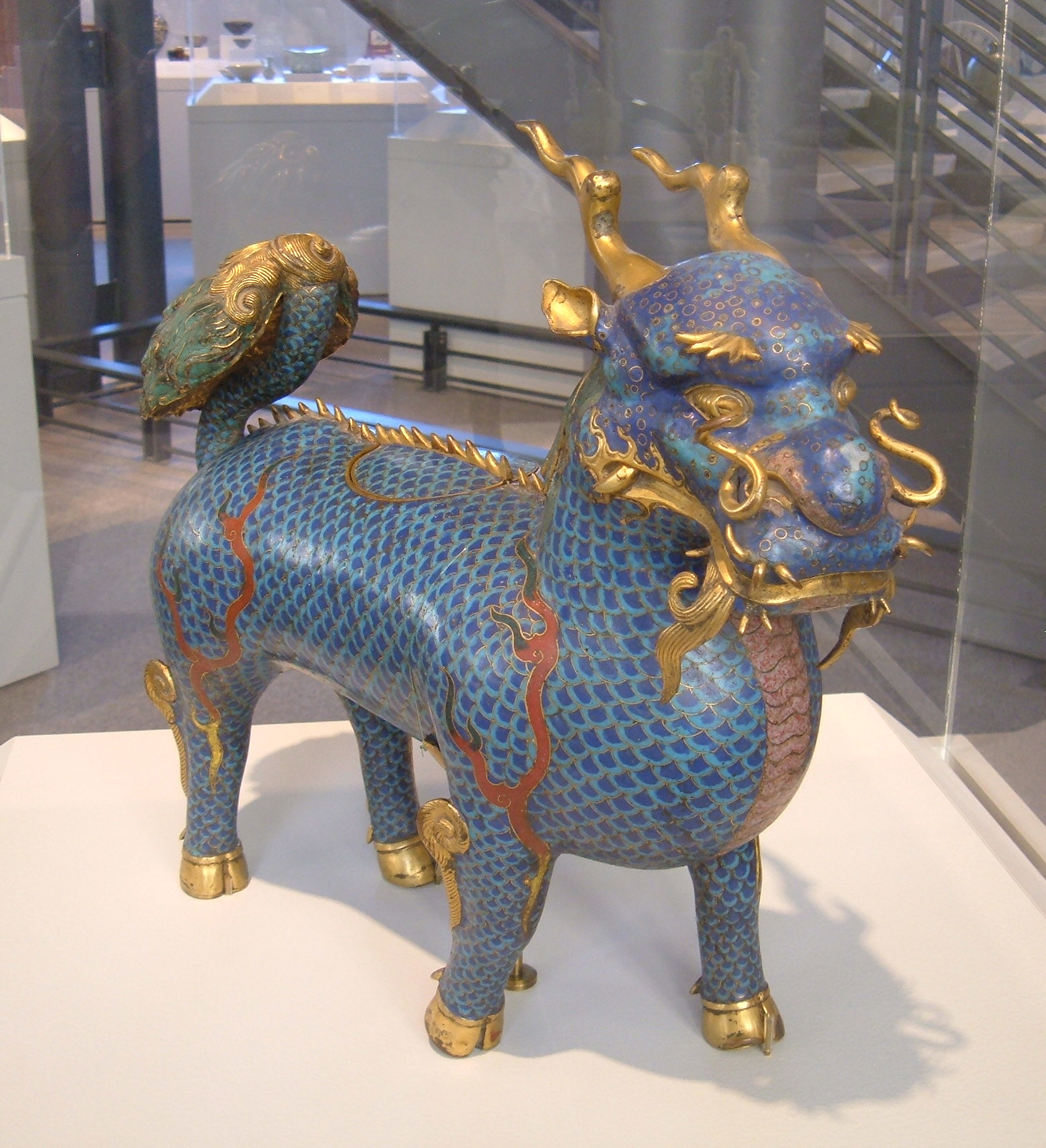
- Qilin-shaped incense burner (Qing dynasty, c. 17th-18th century)

Creature information
- Grouping: Legendary creature
- Sub grouping: Chimera
- Similar entities: kirin, kỳ lân, gilen

Origin
- First attested: 5th century BCE
- Country: China

Qilin
- "Qilin" in Chinese characters

Chinese name
- Chinese: 麒麟
Transcriptions
Standard Mandarin
- Hanyu Pinyin: qílín
- Bopomofo: ㄑㄧˊㄌㄧㄣˊ
- Gwoyeu Romatzyh: chyilin
- Wade–Giles: ch'i^{2}-lin^{2}
- IPA: [tɕʰǐ.lǐn]
Yue: Cantonese
- Yale Romanization: kèih-lèuhn
- Jyutping: kei^{4}-leon^{4}
- IPA: [kʰej˩.lɵn˧˥]
Southern Min
- Hokkien POJ: kî-lîn

Vietnamese name
- Vietnamese alphabet: kỳ lân
- Chữ Hán: 麒麟

Thai name
- Thai: กิเลน
- RTGS: kilen

Korean name
- Hangul: 기린
- Hanja: 麒麟
Transcriptions
- Revised Romanization: Girin
- McCune–Reischauer: Kirin

Japanese name
- Kanji: 麒麟
- Hiragana: きりん
Transcriptions
- Romanization: kirin

Manchu name
- Manchu script: ᡴᡳᠯᡳᠨ
- Romanization: kilin

The qilin (English: /tʃiˈlɪn/ chee-LIN; Chinese: 麒麟; pinyin: qílín) is a legendary hooved chimerical creature that appears in Chinese mythology, and is said to appear with the imminent arrival or death of a sage or illustrious ruler. Qilin are a specific type of the lin mythological family of one-horned beasts. The qilin also appears in the mythologies of other Chinese-influenced cultures.

== Origins ==
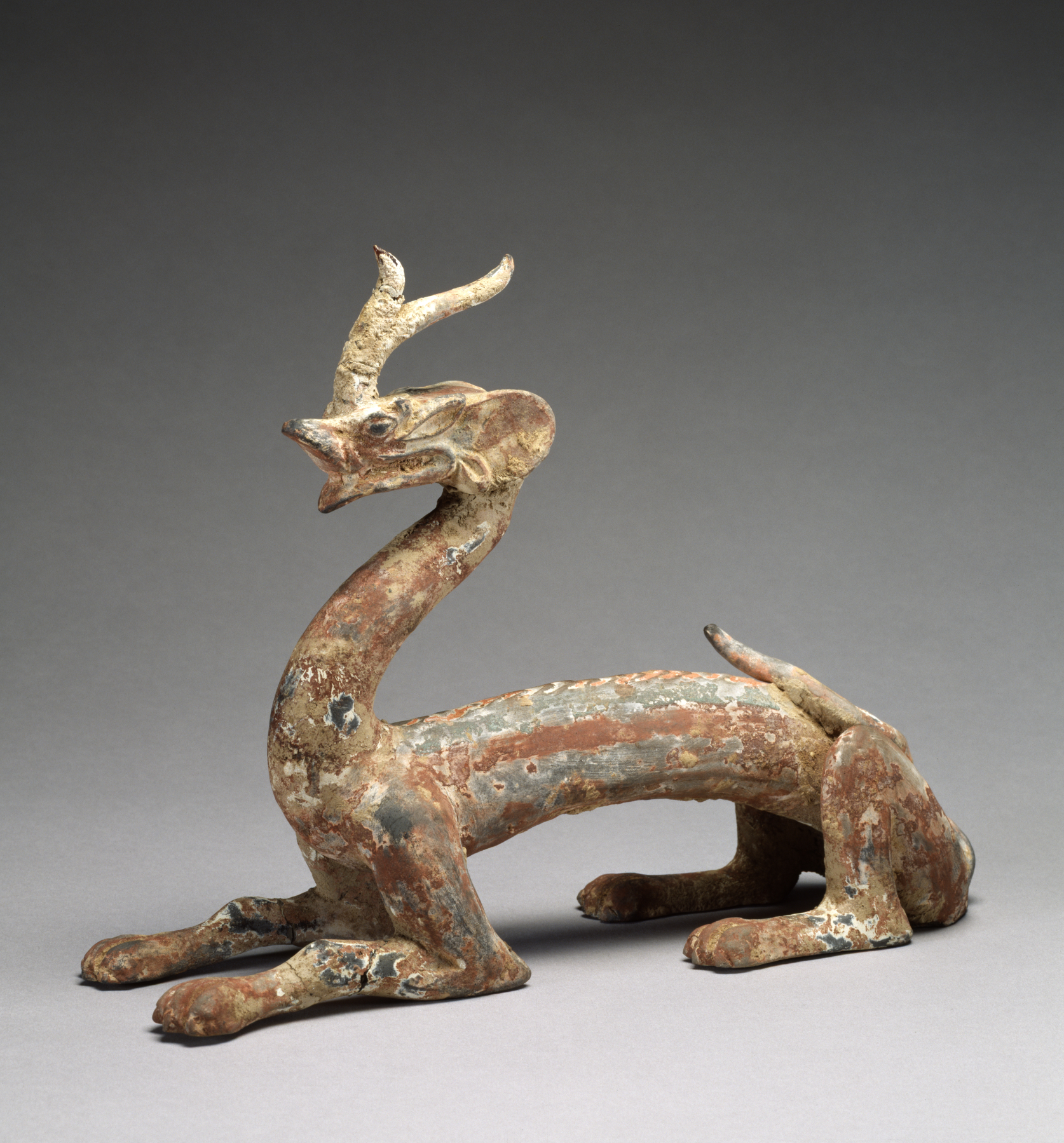
Qilin tomb guardian, 4th century CE

The earliest mention of the mythical qilin is in the poem 麟之趾; Lín zhī zhǐ; 'Feet of the Lin' included in the Classic of Poetry (11th – 7th c. BCE).

麟之趾，振振公子，于嗟麟兮。
麟之定，振振公姓，于嗟麟兮。
麟之角，振振公族，于嗟麟兮。

Translation:

The feet of the Qilin, the noble sons of our lord. Ah, the Qilin!
The forehead of the Qilin, the noble kinsmen of our lord. Ah, the Qilin!
The horn of the Qilin, the noble clansmen of our lord. Ah, the Qilin!

—

Spring and Autumn Annals mentioned that a lin (麟) was captured in the 14th year of Duke Ai of Lu (魯哀公) (481 BCE); Zuo Zhuan credited Confucius with identifying the lin as such.

The bisyllabic form qilin (麒麟 ~ 騏驎), which carries the same generic meaning as lin alone, is attested in works dated to the Warring States period (475–221 BCE). Qi denotes the male and lin denotes the female according to Shuowen Jiezi.

The legendary image of the qilin became associated with the image of the giraffe in the Ming dynasty. The identification of the qilin with giraffes began after Zheng He's 15th-century voyage to East Africa (landing, among other places, Ma-lin (麻林): Malindi (in modern-day Kenya)). While The Ming Dynasty according to Ma Huan, the interpreter who accompanied Zheng He, notes the products of Mogadishu and Barawa, modern-day Somalia (including ivory, ambergris, and camels), he specifically credits Malindi as the source of the qilin (giraffe). His account solidifies the geographic identification. Zheng He's fleet brought back two giraffes to Nanjing. The official court chronicles record the arrival of the giraffe in 1414 (the 12th year of the Yongle Emperor's reign) and they were mistaken by the emperor for the mythical creature. Somalia (Mogadishu) also sent a giraffe, but later and with less fanfare. The records indicate that Mogadishu also sent a giraffe as tribute, but in a later voyage (1415-1417). This giraffe did not capture the court's imagination in the same way as the first one from Malindi, which had already been successfully identified with the mythical qilin. The identification of qilin with giraffes has had a lasting influence: even today, the same word is used for the mythical animal and the giraffe in both Korean and Japanese.

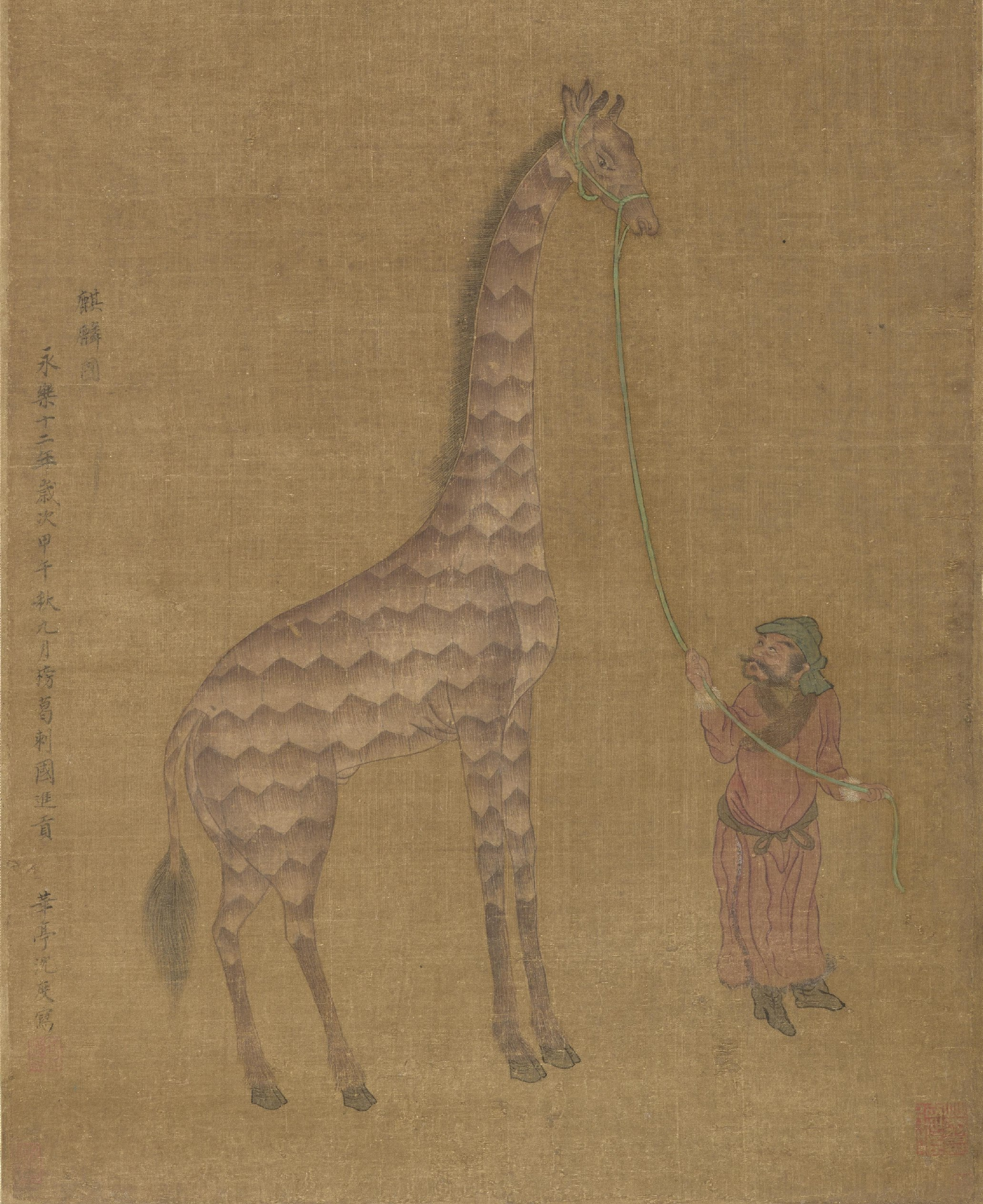
A Ming-era painting of a tribute giraffe, which was thought to be a qilin by court officials, from Bengal

Axel Schuessler reconstructs Old Chinese pronunciation of 麒麟 as *gərin. Finnish linguist Juha Janhunen tentatively compares *gərin to an etymon reconstructed as *kalimV, denoting "whale"; and represented in the language isolate Nivkh and four different language families Tungusic, Mongolic, Turkic and Samoyedic, wherein *kalay(ә)ng means "whale" (in Nenets) and *kalVyǝ "mammoth" (in Enets and Nganasan). As even aborigines "vaguely familiar with the underlying real animals" often confuse the whale, mammoth, and unicorn: they conceptualized the mammoth and whale as aquatic, as well as the mammoth and unicorn possessing a single horn; for inland populations, the extant whale "remains ... an abstraction, in this respect being no different from the extinct mammoth or the truly mythical unicorn." However, Janhunen cautiously remarks that "[t]he formal and semantic similarity between *kilin < *gilin ~ *gïlin 'unicorn' and *kalimV 'whale' (but also Samoyedic *kalay- 'mammoth') is sufficient to support, though perhaps not confirm, the hypothesis of an etymological connection", and also notes a possible connection between Old Chinese and Mongolian (*)kers ~ (*)keris ~ (*)kiris "rhinoceros" (Khalkha: хирс).

== Description ==
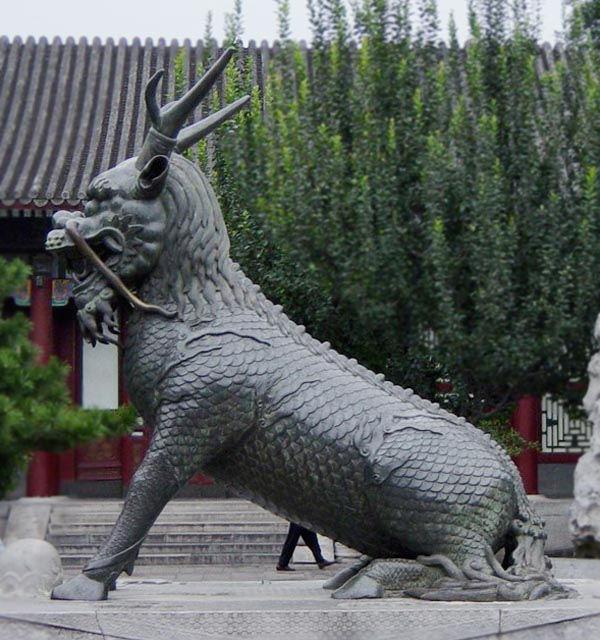
A Qing dynasty statue of a qilin in Beijing's Summer Palace

Qilin generally have Chinese dragon-like features: similar heads with antlers, eyes with thick eyelashes, manes that always flow upward, and beards. The body is fully or partially scaled and often shaped like an ox, deer, or horse, or more commonly a goat. They are always shown with cloven hooves. While dragons in China (and thus qilin) are also most commonly depicted as golden, qilin may be of any color or even various colors, and can be depicted as bejeweled or exhibiting a jewel-like brilliance.

The qilin is depicted throughout a wide range of Chinese art, sometimes with parts of their bodies on fire.

Legends tell that qilin have appeared in the garden of the legendary Yellow Emperor and in the capital of Emperor Yao; both events bore testimony to the benevolent nature of the rulers. It has also been told that the birth of the great sage Confucius was foretold by the arrival of a qilin.

=== Qilin as unicorns ===
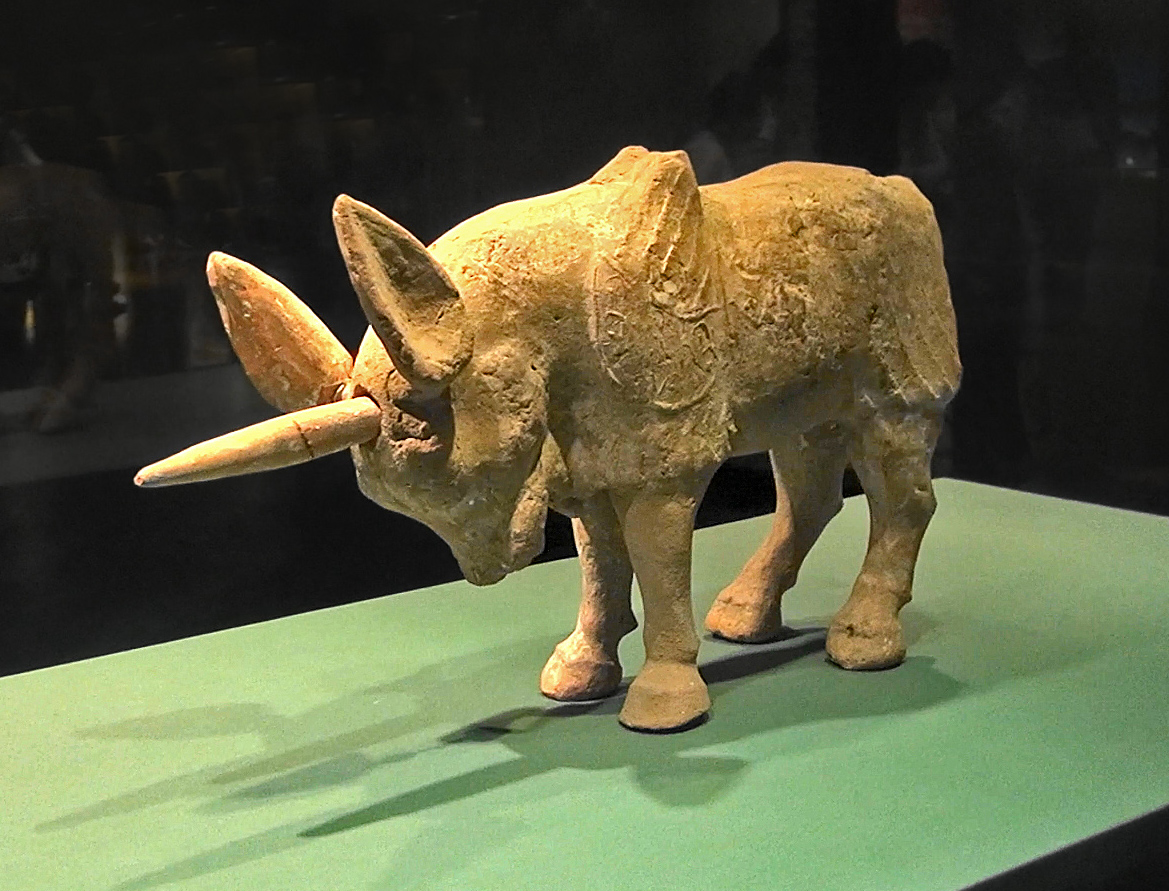
One-horned beast depicted in ceramic model from Northern Wei period (386–534)

In modern times, the depictions of qilin have often fused with the Western concept of unicorns, and qilin (麒麟) is often translated into English as "unicorn". The Han dynasty dictionary Shuowen Jiezi describes qi as single-horned, and it can sometimes be depicted as having a single horn. The translation, however, may be misleading, as qilin can also be depicted as having two horns. In modern Chinese, "one-horned beast" (独角兽; 獨角獸; Dújiǎoshòu) is used for "unicorns". A number of different Chinese mythical creatures can be depicted with a single horn, and a qilin depicted with one horn may be called a "one-horned qilin" in Chinese.

Nevertheless, the mythical and etymological connections between the creatures have been noted by various cultural studies and even the Chinese government, which has minted silver, gold, and platinum commemorative coins depicting both archetypal creatures.

== Other cultural representations ==
=== Japan ===
Kirin, which has also come to be used as the modern Japanese word for a giraffe, are similar to qilin. Japanese art tends to depict the kirin as more deer-like than in Chinese art. Alternatively, it is depicted as a dragon shaped like a deer, but with an ox's tail instead of a lion's tail. They are also often portrayed as partially unicorn-like in appearance, but with a backwards curving horn.

=== Korea ===
Girin or kirin (기린) is the Korean form of qilin. It is described as a maned creature with the torso of a deer, an ox tail with the hooves of a horse. The girin were initially depicted as more deer-like, however over time they have transformed into more horse-like. They were one of the four divine creatures along with the dragon, phoenix, and turtle. Girin were extensively used in Korean royal and Buddhist arts.

In modern Korean, the term "girin" is used for "giraffe".

=== Thailand ===
In Thailand, the qilin is known as "gilen" (Thai: กิเลน), and is a member of the pantheon of Thai Himapant forest mythical animals. It is most probable that the Gilen was introduced into the pantheon under the influence of the Tai Yai who came down from Southern China to settle in Siam in ancient times, and the legend was probably incorporated into the Himapant legends of Siam in this manner. The Gilen is a mixture of various animals which come from differing elemental environments, representing elemental magical forces present within each personified creature. Many of the Himapant animals actually represent gods and devas of the Celestial Realms, and bodhisattvas, who manifest as personifications which represent the true nature of each creature deity through the symbolism of the various body parts amalgamated into the design of the Mythical creature.

In Phra Aphai Mani, the masterpiece epic poem of Sunthorn Phu, a renowned poet of the 19th century, there is a monster that is Sudsakorn's steed, one of the main characters in the epic. This creature was called "Ma Nin Mangkorn" (Thai: ม้านิลมังกร, "ceylonite dragon horse") and is depicted as having diamond fangs, ceylonite scales, and a birthmark on the tongue. It was a mixture of horse, dragon, deer antlers, fish scales, and Phaya Nak tail, and has black sequins all over. Its appearance resembles a qilin.

== Qilin Dance ==
The Qilin dance is traditionally performed by the Hakka people. The Qilin is a mythical creature believed to symbolize good fortune, prosperity, and harmony, and performers wear ornate Qilin costumes with vibrant colors and intricate details to resemble the mythical creature.

The Qilin costume features a single horn in the middle, with finned ridges lined with fur. The dance involves graceful and synchronized movements that mimic cats and tigers. The performance routine typically tells of a Qilin exiting its lair, playfully move round, and looking for vegetable to eat. After eating from the vegetable, it spits it out, and it also spits a jade book, before moving around and returning back to its lair.

The dance is accompanied by music played on traditional Chinese instruments, including drums, flutes, and cymbals. Today, similar to the Chinese Lion and Dragon dances, the Qilin dance is commonly performed during important Chinese celebrations and festivals, such as Chinese New Year and weddings, it is also performed to preserve cultural traditions and enhance community cohesion.

== Gallery ==
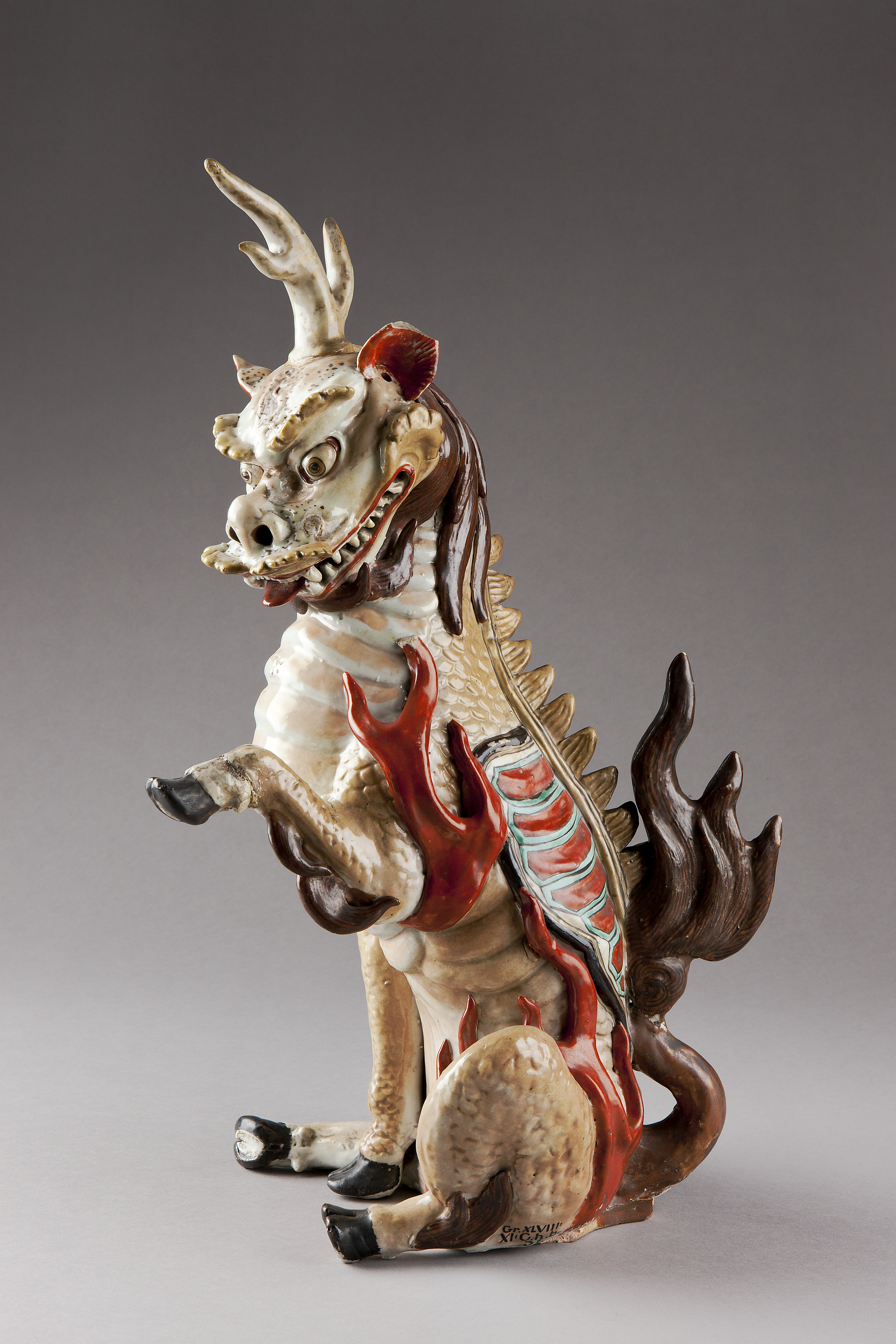
Porcelain qilin with the head and scaly body of a dragon, tail of a lion and cloven hoofs like a deer, its body enveloped in sacred flames (Qing dynasty, c. 1750)

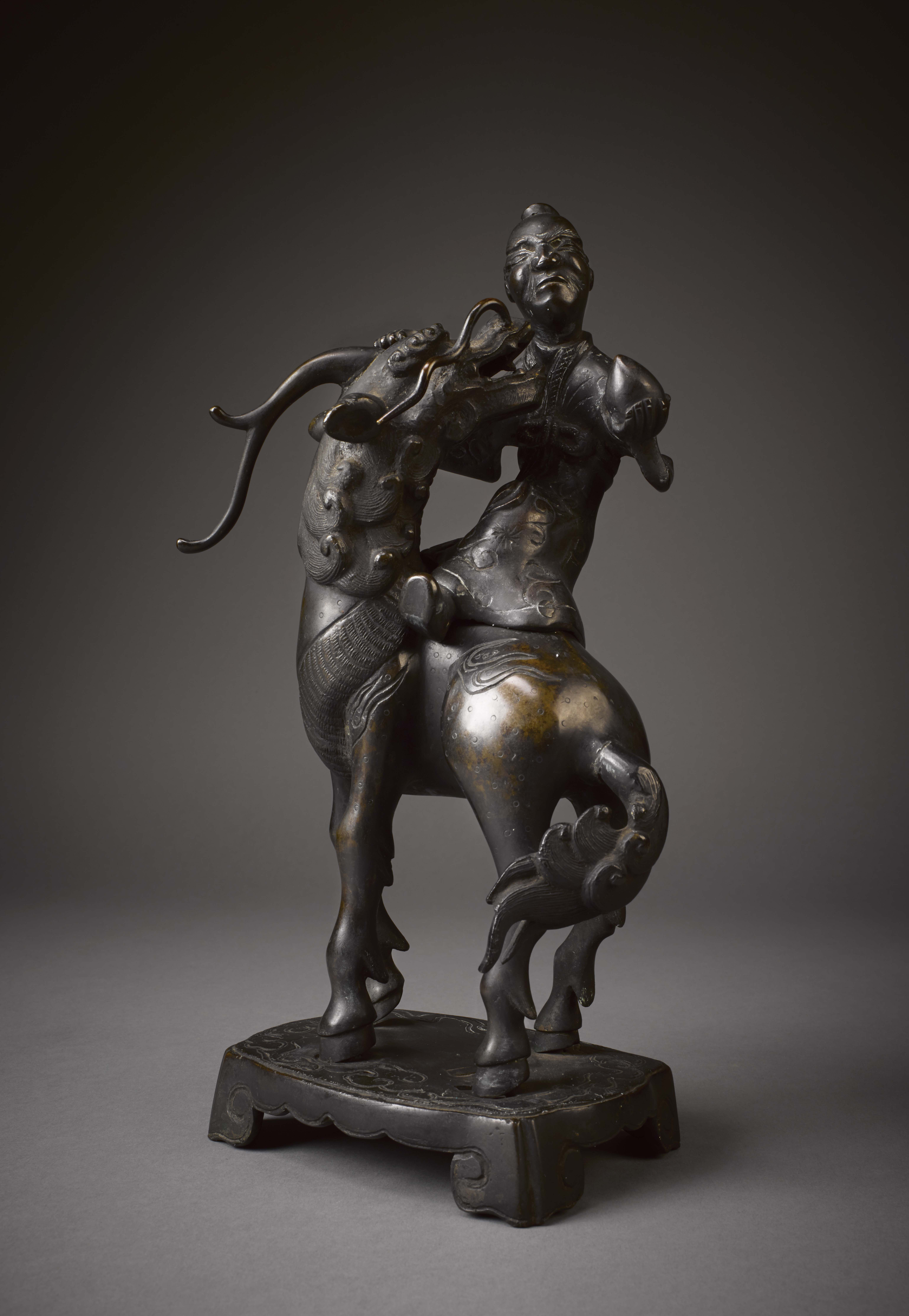
Qilin with rider (Qing dynasty, c. 1800-1894)

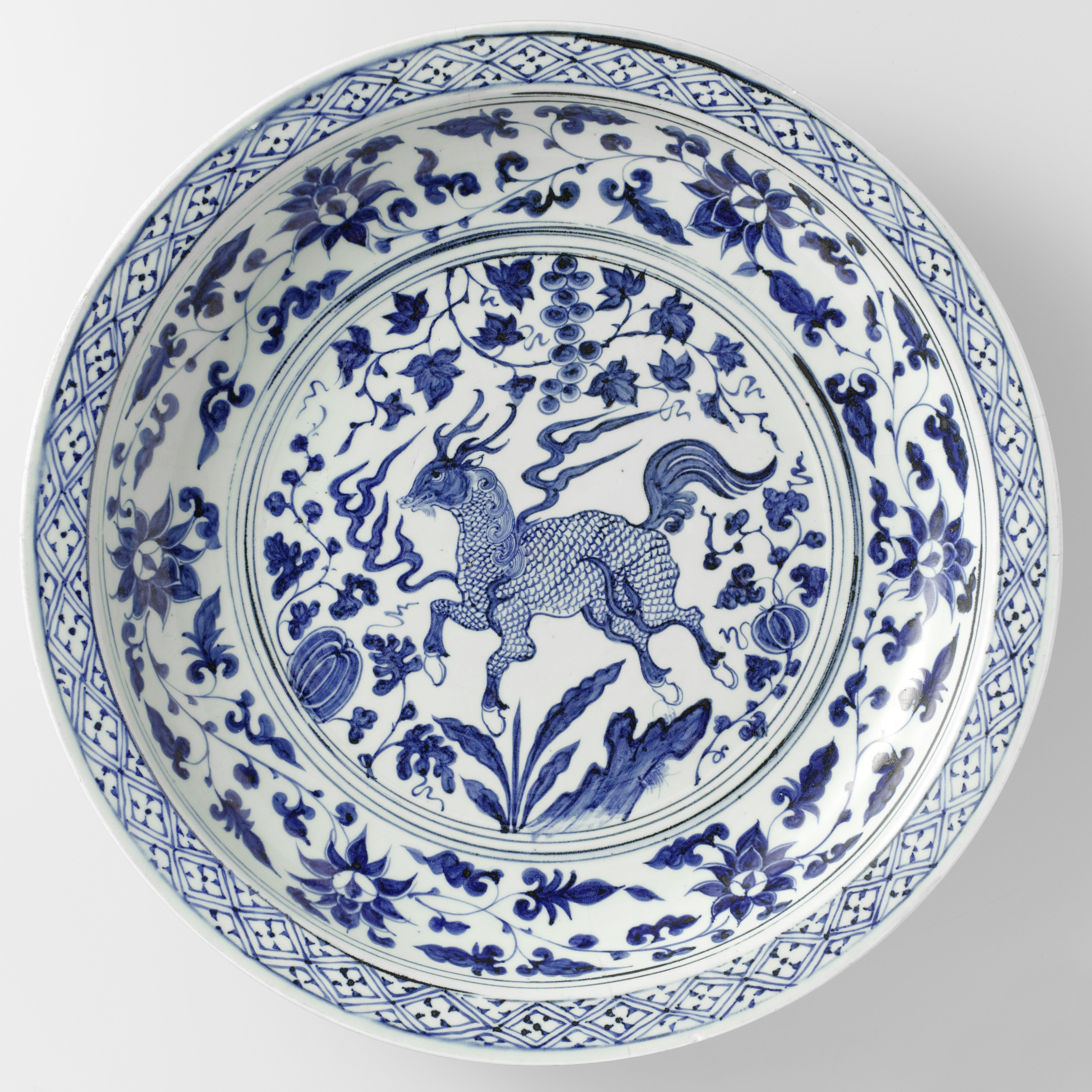
Plate with a qilin in the center (Yuan dynasty, c. 1350)

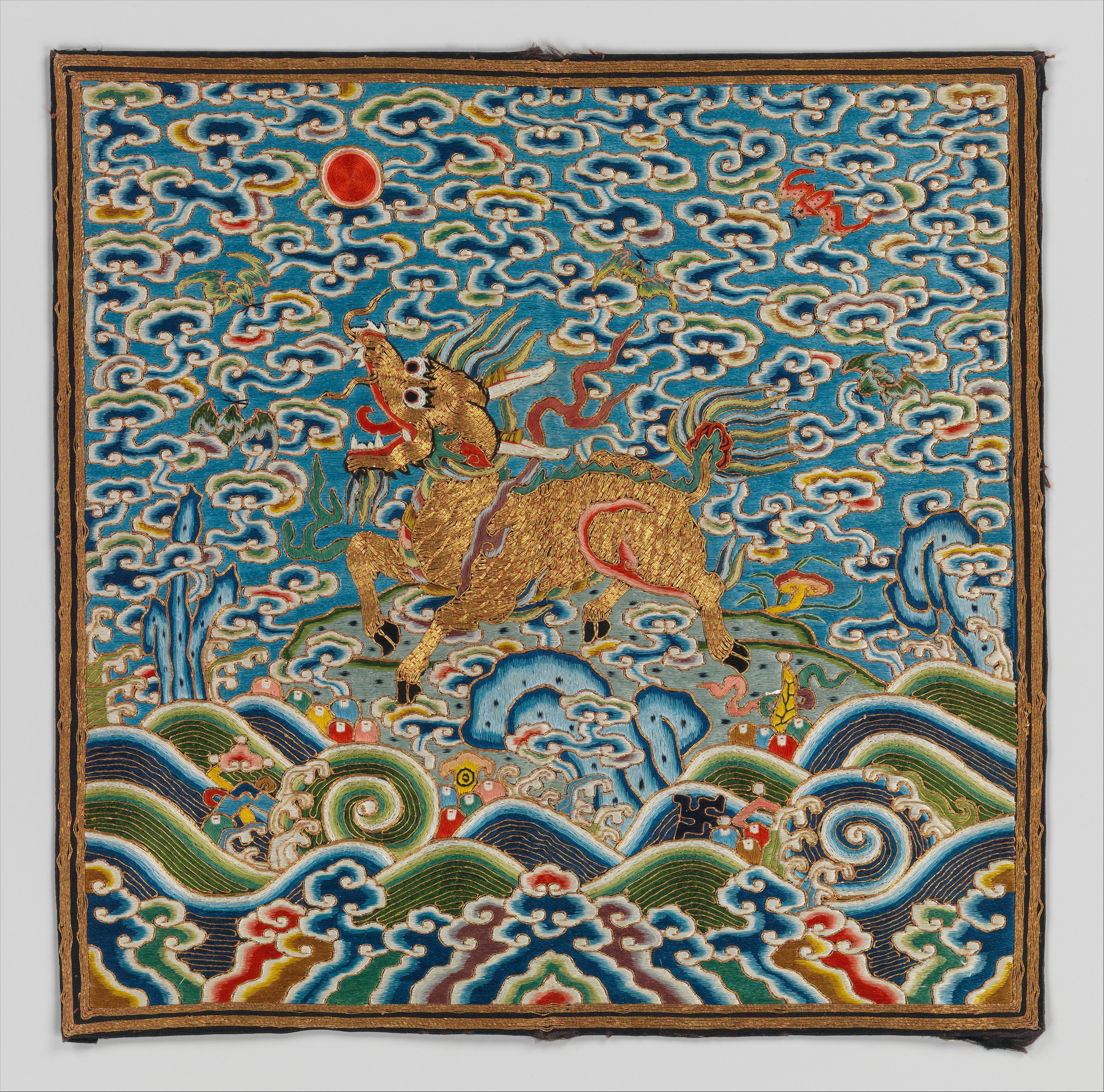
Embroidered qilin buzi (Qing dynasty, 19th century)

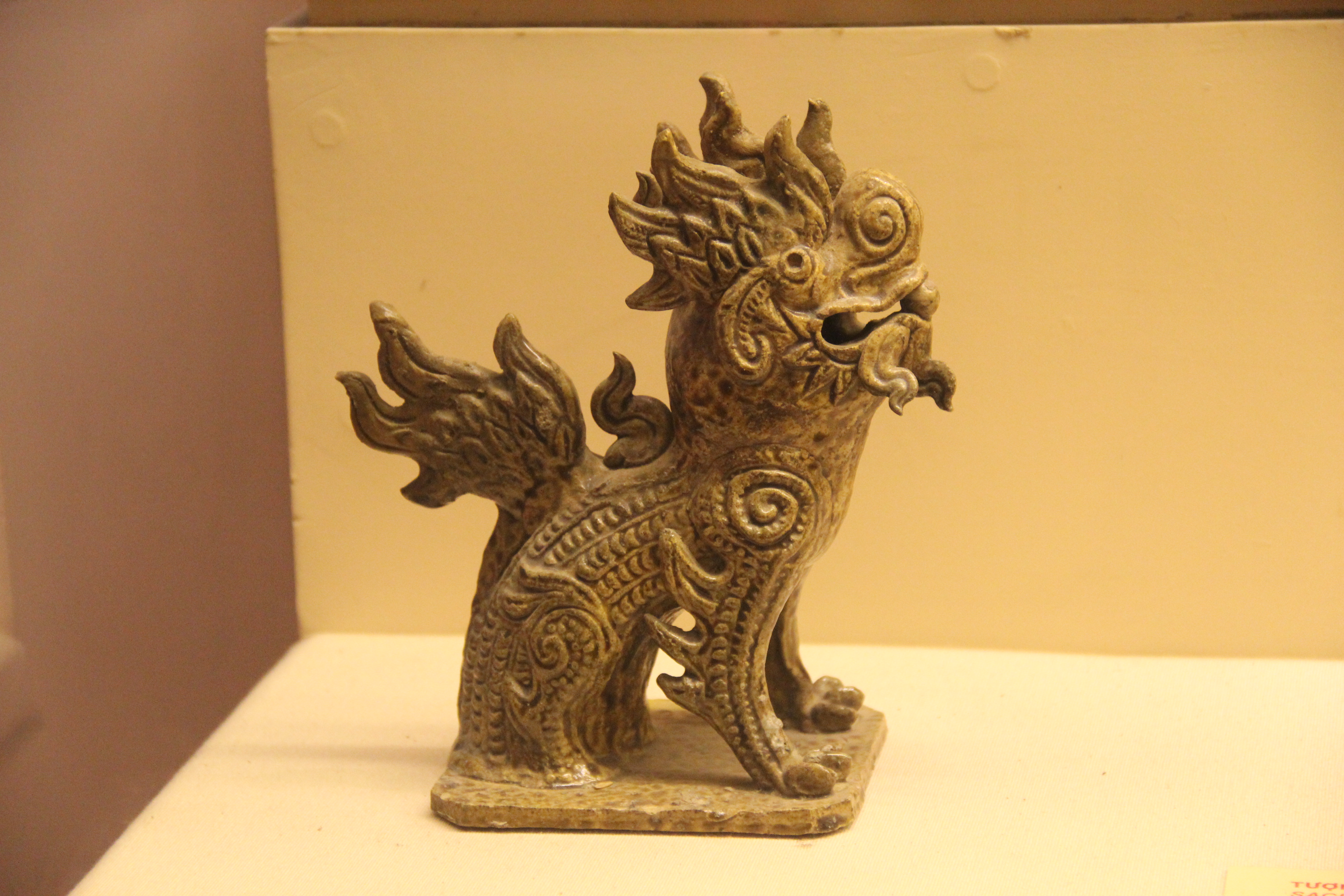
Ceramic Kỳ lân statue (Later Lê or Nguyen dynasty, c. 17th-19th century)

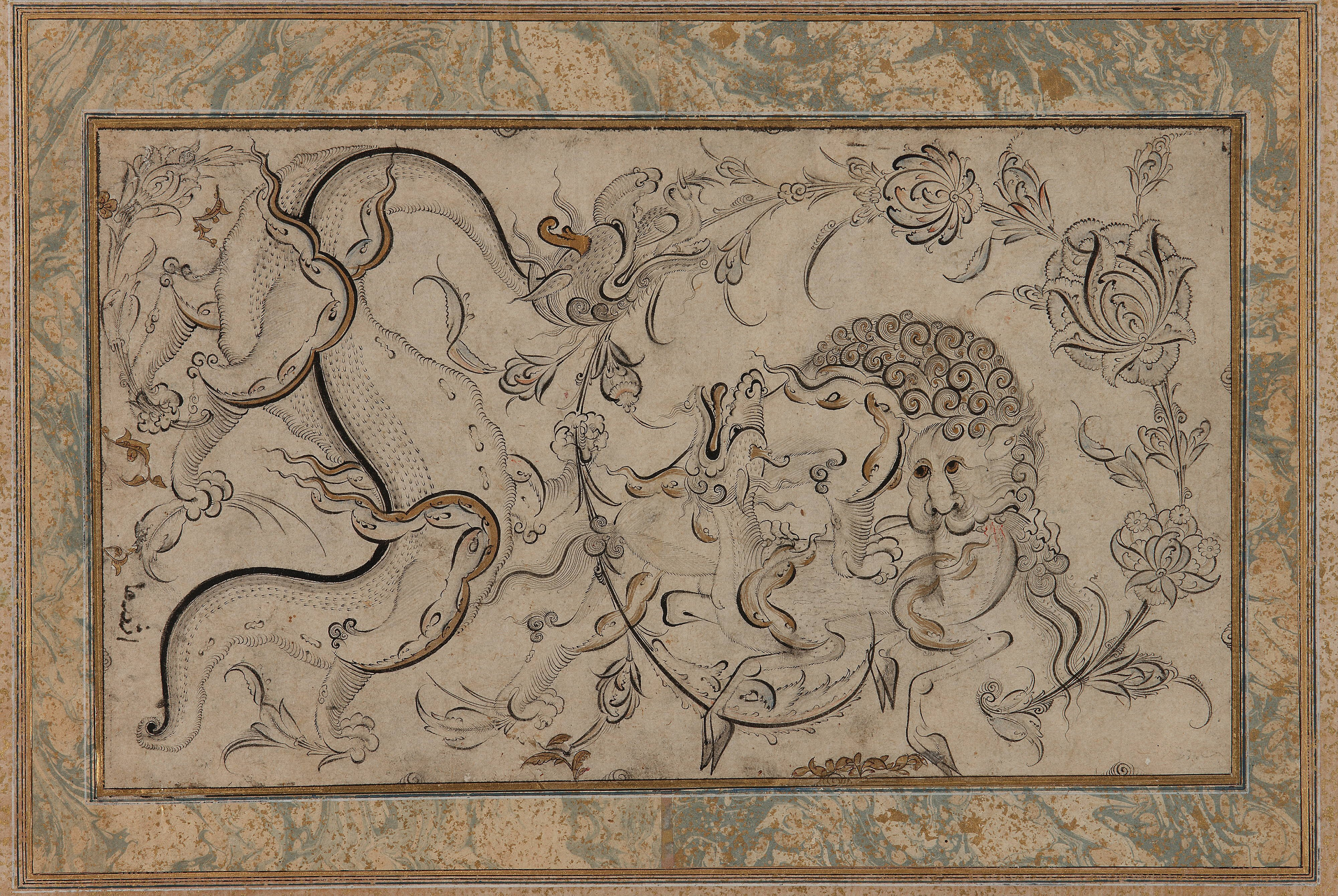
Qilin, dragon and lion set in floral sprays (Ottoman empire, mid-16th century)

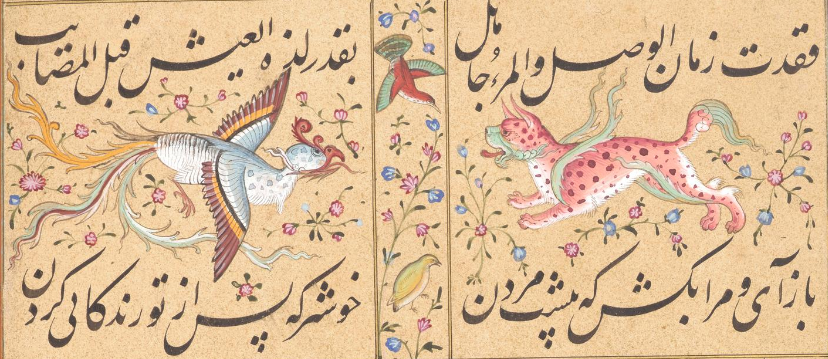
An illustration of qilin and simurgh in Gulistan (1582)

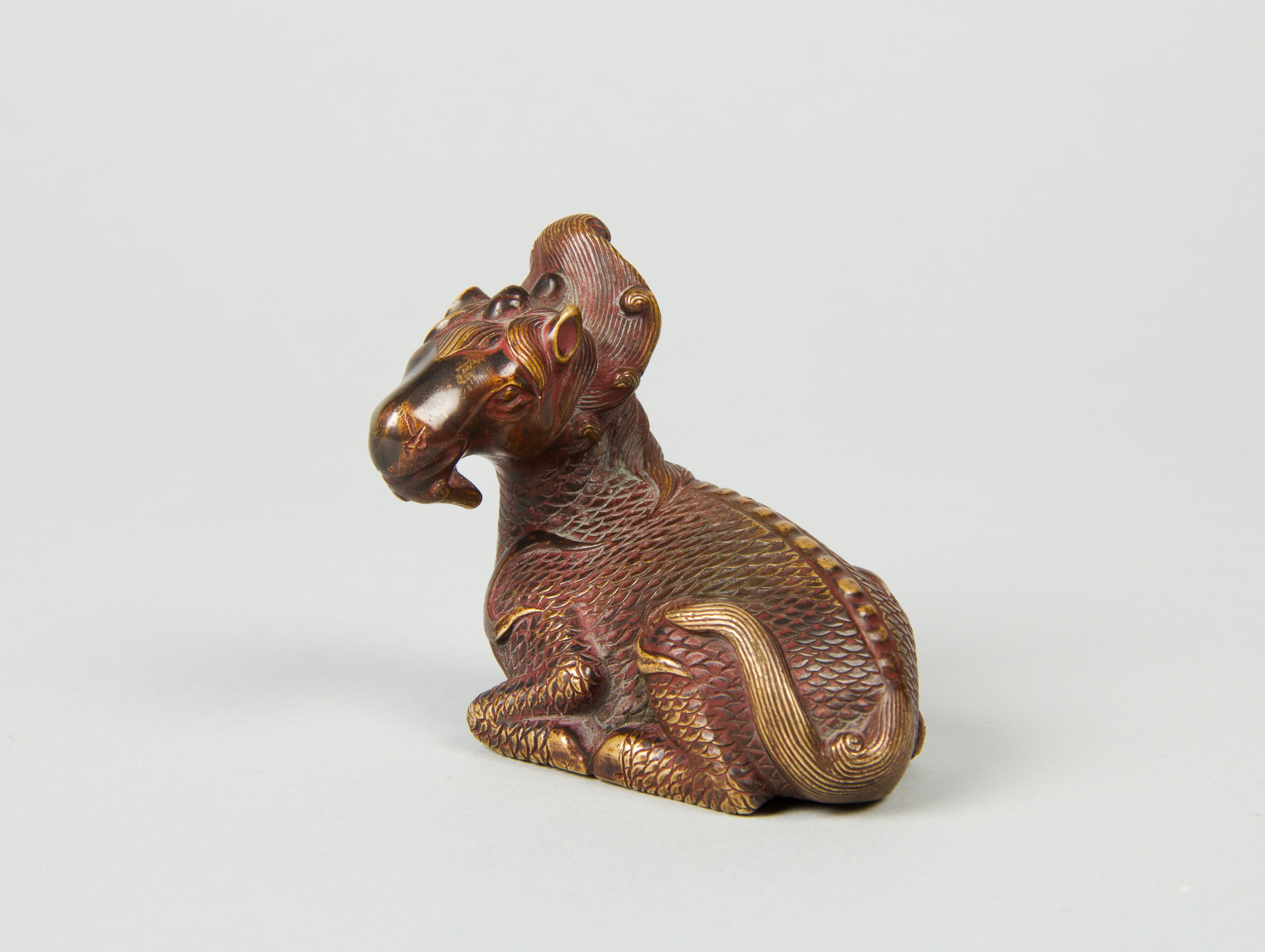
Bronze qilin paperweight (Ming dynasty, c. 15th century)

Qilin depicted in the Gujin Tushu Jicheng (Qing dynasty, c. 1700-1725)

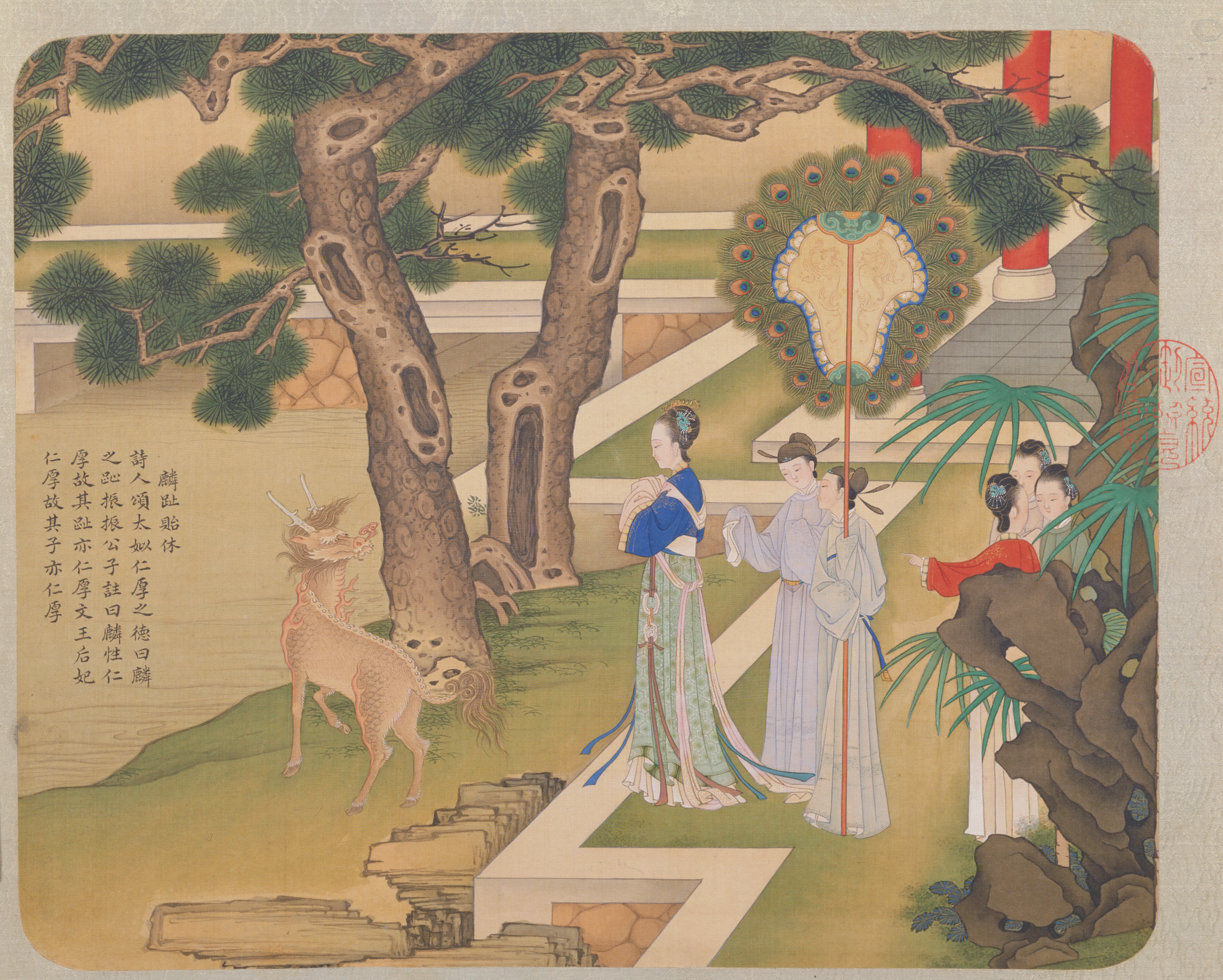
Tai Si encountering a qilin, depicted in Jiao Bingzhen's Virtuous Empresses and Empresses Dowager in Successive Dynasties (Qing dynasty, 18th century)

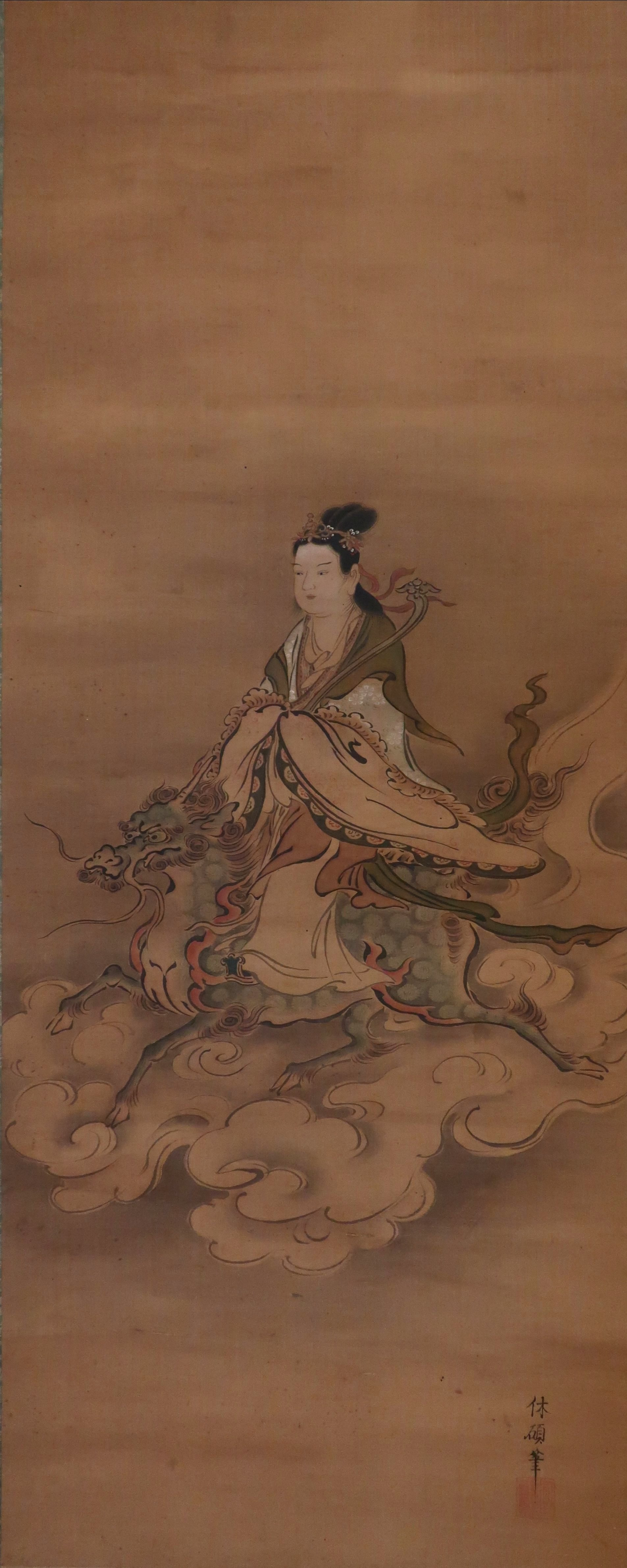
Queen Mother of the West Riding a Kirin, Kanō Kyūseki (Edo period, early 18th century)

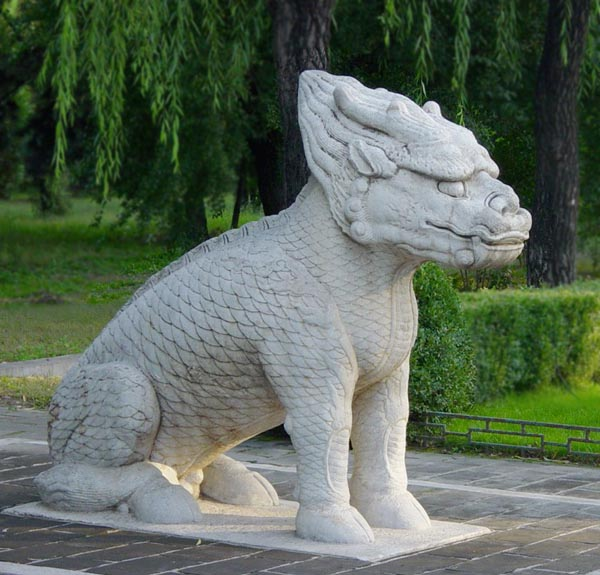
A qilin at the Ming tombs in the dragon, fish, and ox style (Ming dynasty, c. 15th-17th century)

== See also ==
- Chinese spiritual world concepts
- Chinthe
- Four Holy Beasts
- Kanglasha
- Longma
- Nian
- Nongshaba
- Pakhangba
- Pixiu
- Poubi Lai
- Questing Beast
- Serpopard
- Nghê
- Shaanxi Kylins
- Shisa
- Singha
- Sin-you
- Taoroinai
- Xiezhi
- Yali
