= Thai Short Film and Video Festival =

Film festival in Thailand

The Thai Short Film and Video Festival (Thai: เทศกาลภาพยนตร์สั้น) is an annual film festival held in Bangkok, Thailand, devoted to short film, student film, animation, experimental film and documentary films. It was established in 1997, organised by the Thai Film Foundation.

The festival's main scope is competition of Thai short films, mainly by independent Thai film makers. There are additional special programmes, based on various themes. Films from overseas are also exhibited, in an international competition section, and in specially packaged programmes.

== Awards ==
- R. D. Pestonji Award – Granted to the winner of the Best Thai Short Film. Top prize winners are awarded a medal and 20,000 baht. Two runners up win cash prizes of 10,000 baht each. The prize is named for Rattana Pestonji, a pioneering Thai independent director, screenwriter, producer and cinematographer.
- White Elephant Award – Granted to the winner of the Best Thai Student Film. Prize winners are awarded a white elephant statuette and 20,000 baht. Two runners up win cash prizes of 10,000 baht each.
- Payut Ngaokrachang Award – Granted to the Best Thai Animated Film. The top honouree wins a cash prize of 20,000 baht and a medal designed by pioneering Thai animator Payut Ngaokrachang. Two runners up win cash prizes of 10,000 baht each.
- Duke Award – This award was established in 2001 to recognise short films with "unusual subjects". The winner receives 10,000 baht and a medal. Two runners-up win 5,000 each. The award takes its name from the nickname of Prince Sanbassatra, the brother of King Chulalongkorn who was the first Thai filmmaker and is considered the "Father of Thai Film".
- Special White Elephant Award – This award goes to the Best Short Film made by a filmmaker 17 years old or younger. The winner receives a cash prize of 10,000 baht and two runners-up win 5,000 baht.
- Kodak Film School Competition – An honour for cinematographers, the award goes to shorts shot on Kodak film. Winners receive 5,000 baht and a chance to compete in a regional Kodak competition.
- Vichitmatra Award – Granted by the Vichitmatra Foundation, the 5,000-baht award honours films that "demonstrate distinctive achievements in film making according to the jury's judgement".
- Pirakabo Award – Granted by the 14 October 73 Memorial Foundation grants a cash prize of 5,000 baht to the film with the strongest themes of freedom, equality and urging social concern.
- Popular Vote Award – Granted to the most popular short, according to audience vote. The winner receives 5,000 baht.

== Digital Forum ==
An offshoot of the Thai Short Film and Video Festival, the Digital Forum was first held in September 2007, as a showcase of feature-length independent digital film productions.

== See also ==
- Bangkok International Film Festival
- World Film Festival of Bangkok
