= Legend of Sudsakorn =

- Thai film poster
- Directed by: Kaisorn Buranasing
- Written by: Namchoke Daengput
- Produced by: Jirun Ratthanaviriyachai
- Starring: Charlie Trairat; Suchao Pongwilai; Pemanee Sungkorn; Surachai Sangarkart
- Cinematography: Kraisorn Buranasing
- Edited by: Thawat Sermsuwittayawong
- Music by: Kaiwan Kulavadhanothai; Rukpol Rukkanam
- Distributed by: Mono Film
- Release date: 30 November 2006
- Running time: 93 minutes
- Country: Thailand
- Language: Thai

Legend of Sudsakorn (Thai: สุดสาคร) is a 2006 Thai fantasy film. It is based on a story from Phra Aphai Mani, a 30,000-line epic poem by Thailand's best-known poet Sunthorn Phu.

Charlie Trairat, the young male lead from Fan Chan, portrays the title character, a boy who is the son of a mermaid who is sent on a magical quest to find his father, a prince. It is a mix of live action and computer-generated imagery.

The story was previously adapted in the 1979 Thai animated feature, The Adventure of Sudsakorn.

== Cast ==
- Charlie Trairat as Sudsakorn
- Suchao Pongwilai as Prachao Ta
- Pemanee Sungkorn as Sudsakorn's mother
- Surachai Sangarkart as Prince Aphai Mani
