= Sin-you =

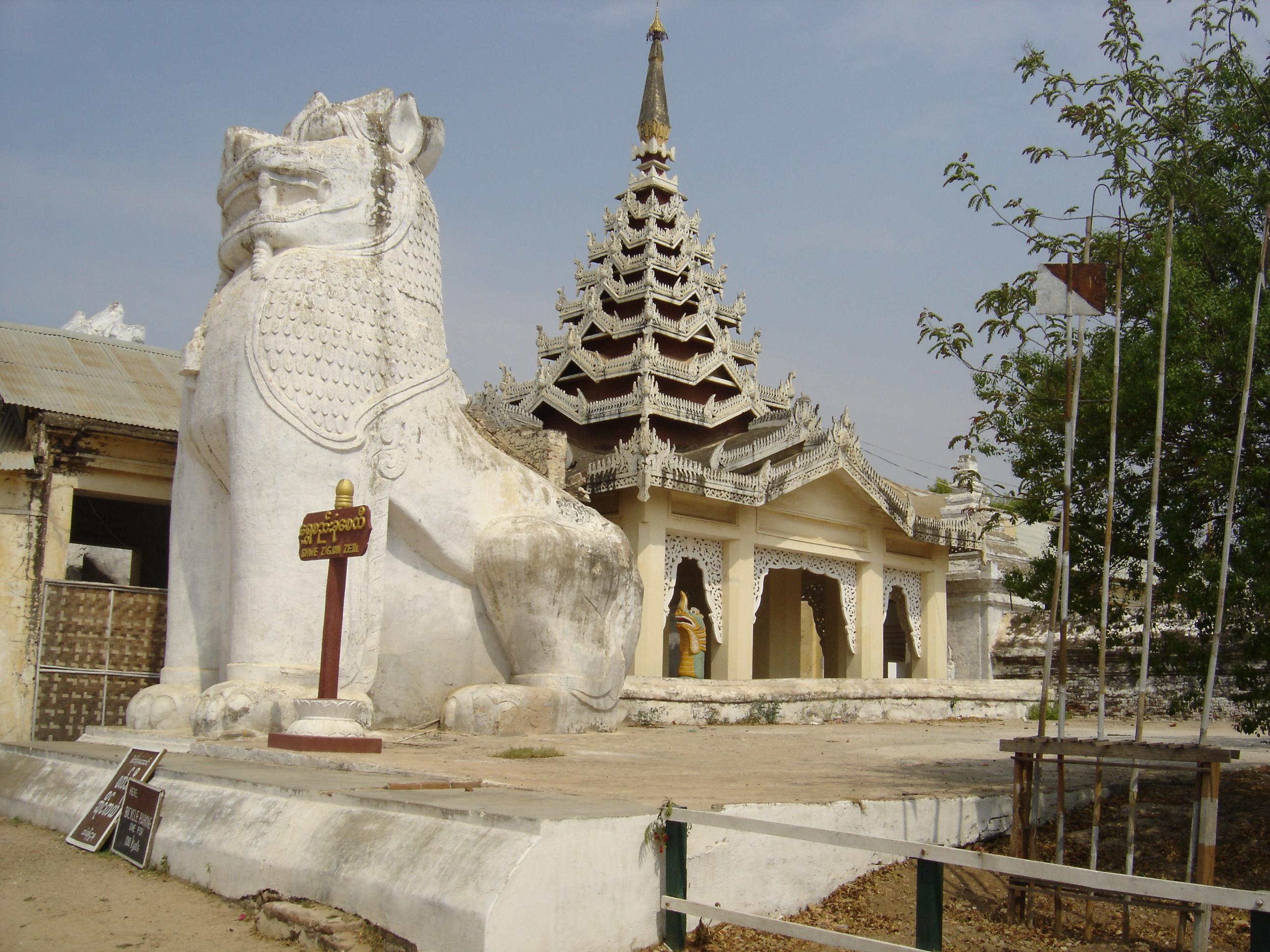
Sin-you in Shwezigon Pagoda, a Buddhist temple located in Nyaung-U, a town near Bagan, in Myanmar.

The Sin-you (Japanese 神羊, shin'yō, also called Hiai Chai, Chiai Tung, or Kai Tsi) is a mythical creature known throughout various East Asian cultures.

The appearance of the Sin-you is similar to that of a Qilin, but more feral and imposing. It is a large quadruped with a feline or ovine body, a shaggy mane, and is either depicted with hooves or feline paws (the latter often to stress its difference from the Qilin). It has a single, unbranching horn in the center of its head, like a western unicorn. The Sin-you’s eyes are said to be very intense and imposing, figuratively burning into whomever it gazes at in a predatory fashion.

The Sin-you is highly symbolic of justice, and is believed to have the power to know if a person is lying or know if they are guilty with a glance. It sometimes depicted at court beside the ruler or judge: if a person told a falsehood in its presence, it would leap forward and impale the perjurer though the heart with its horn. In other instances, the judge would put convicted murderers before the Sin-you, who would slay them in the same fashion if they were truly the perpetrator, but leave the innocent unharmed.

== Gallery ==
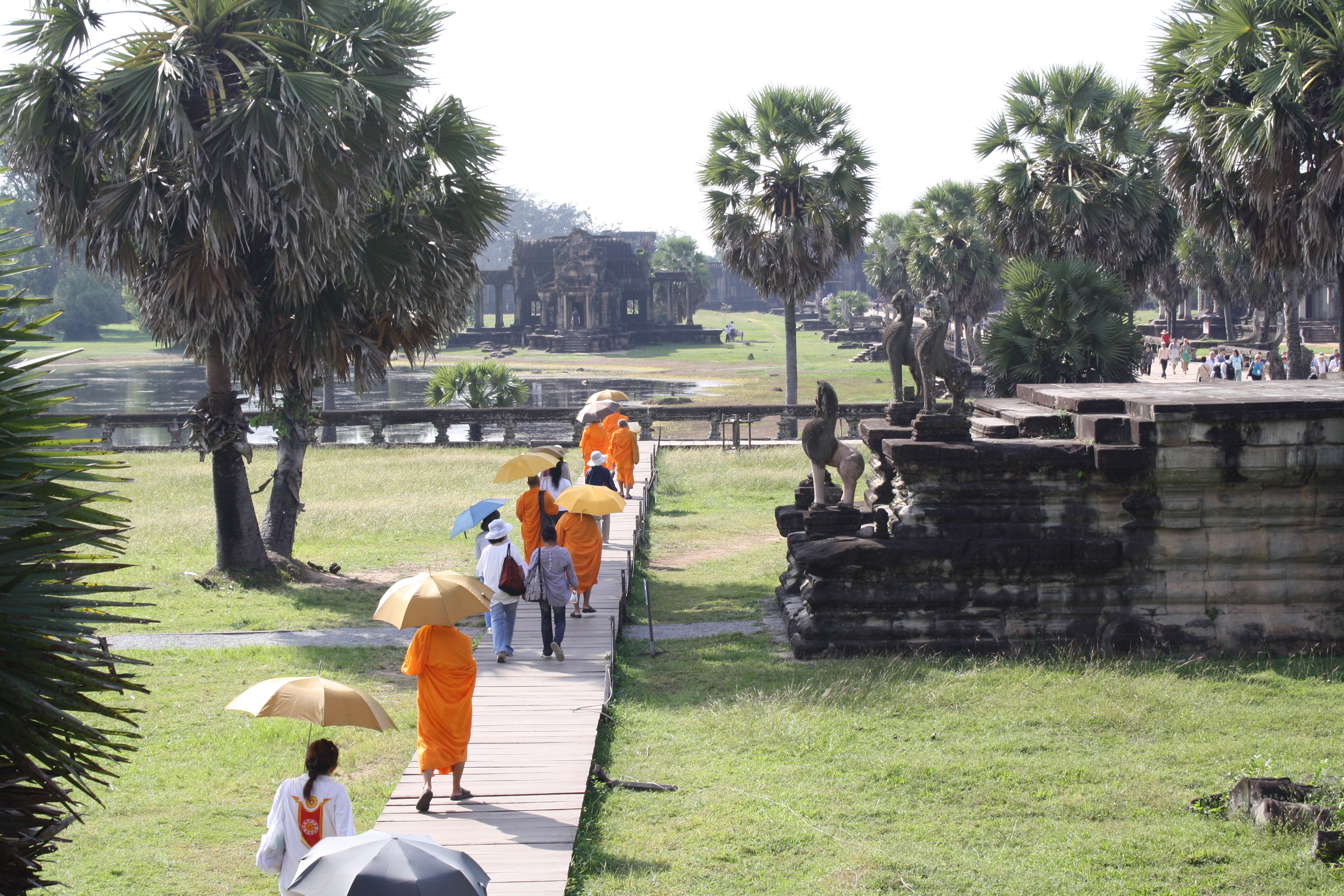

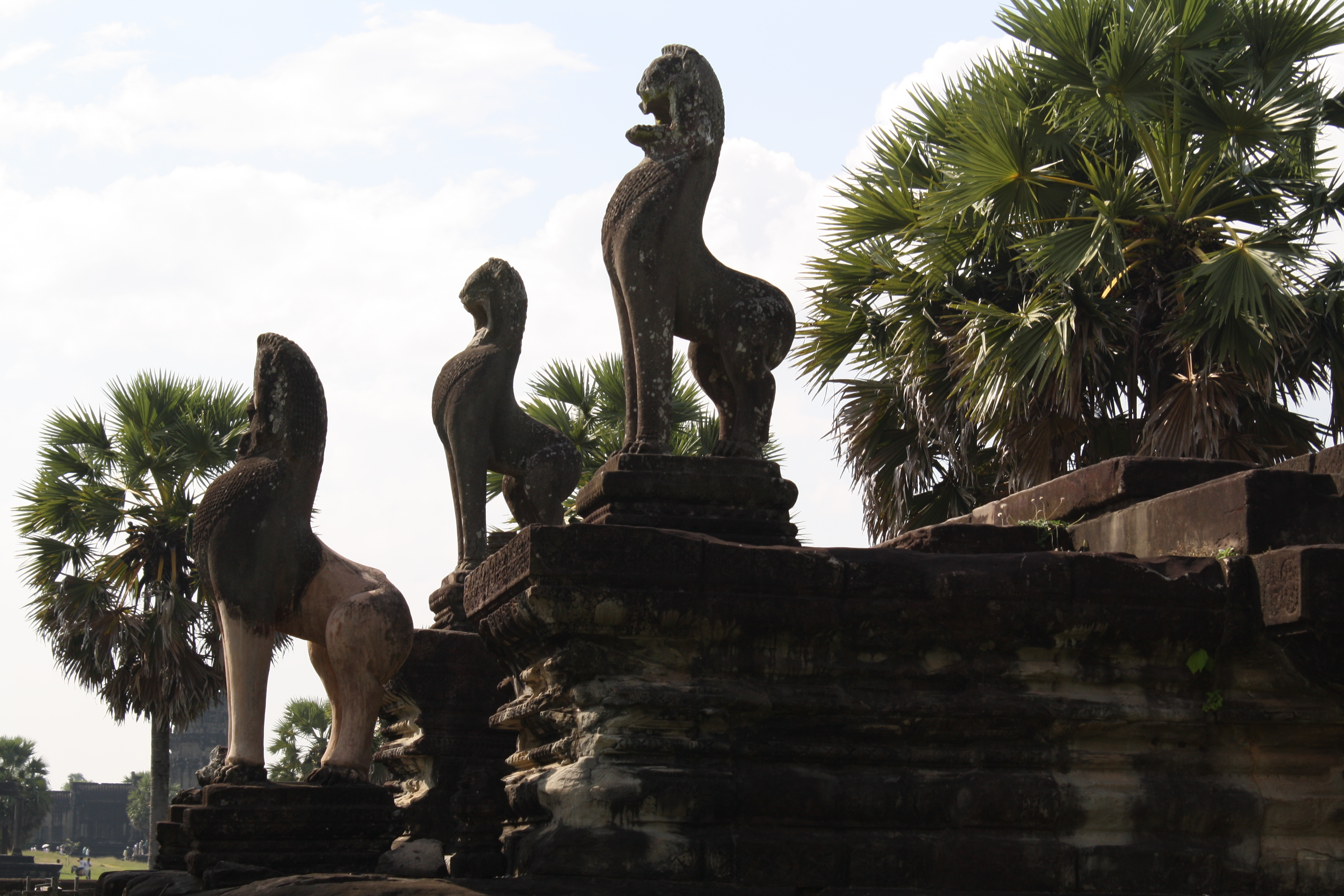

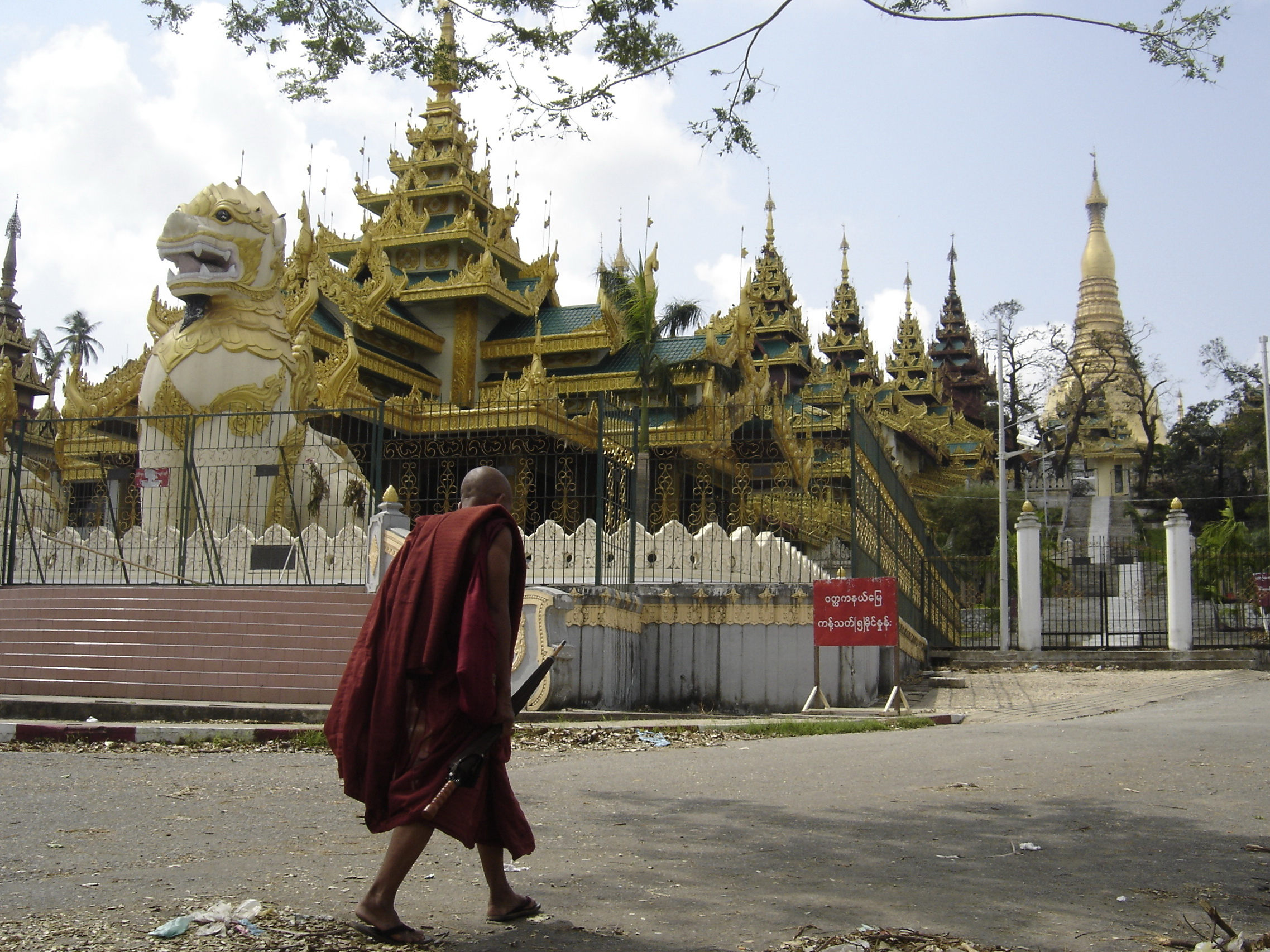

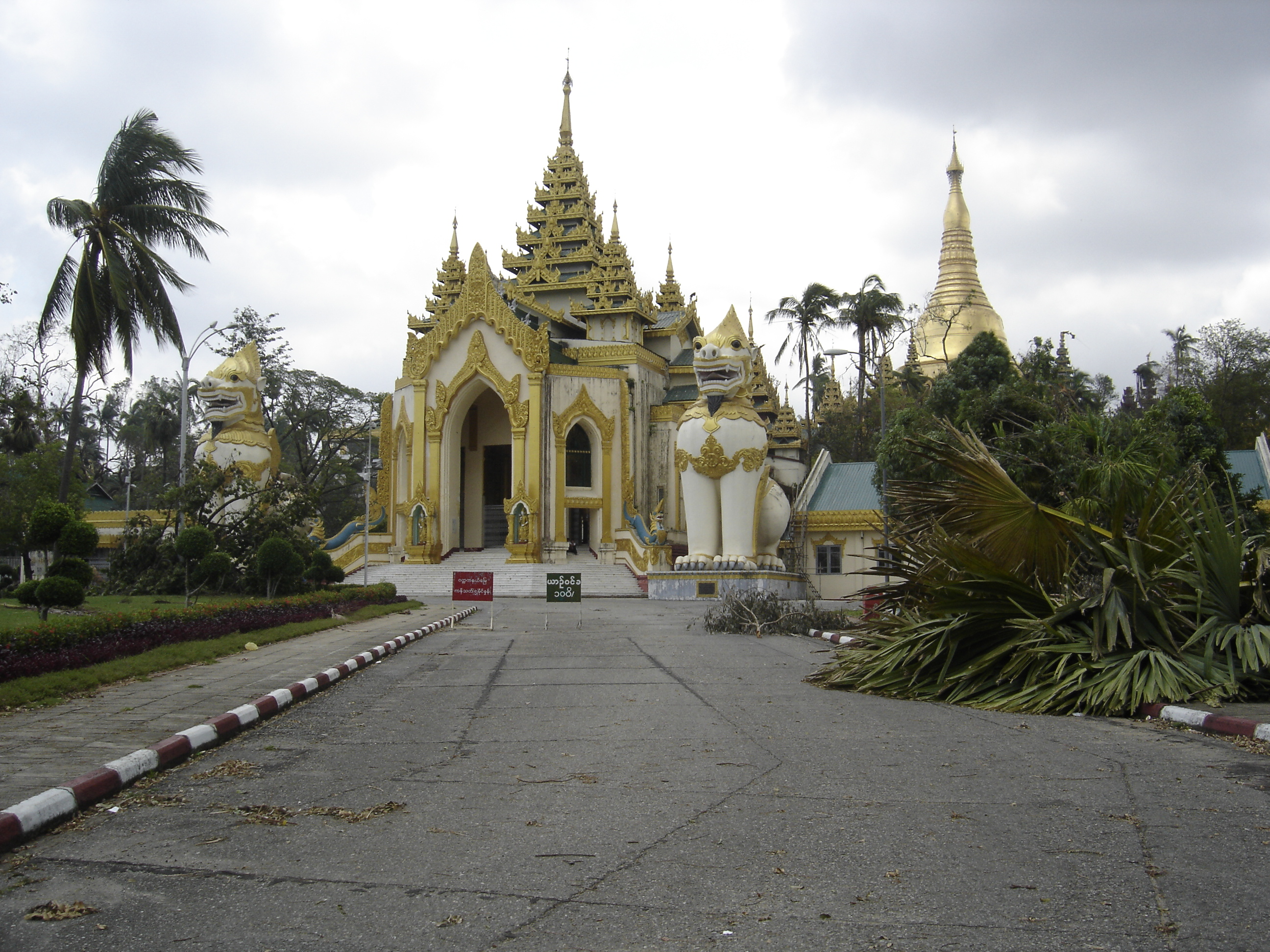
