= Sunthorn Phu =

Thai poet (1786–1855)

Phra Sunthorn Vohara (Phu)
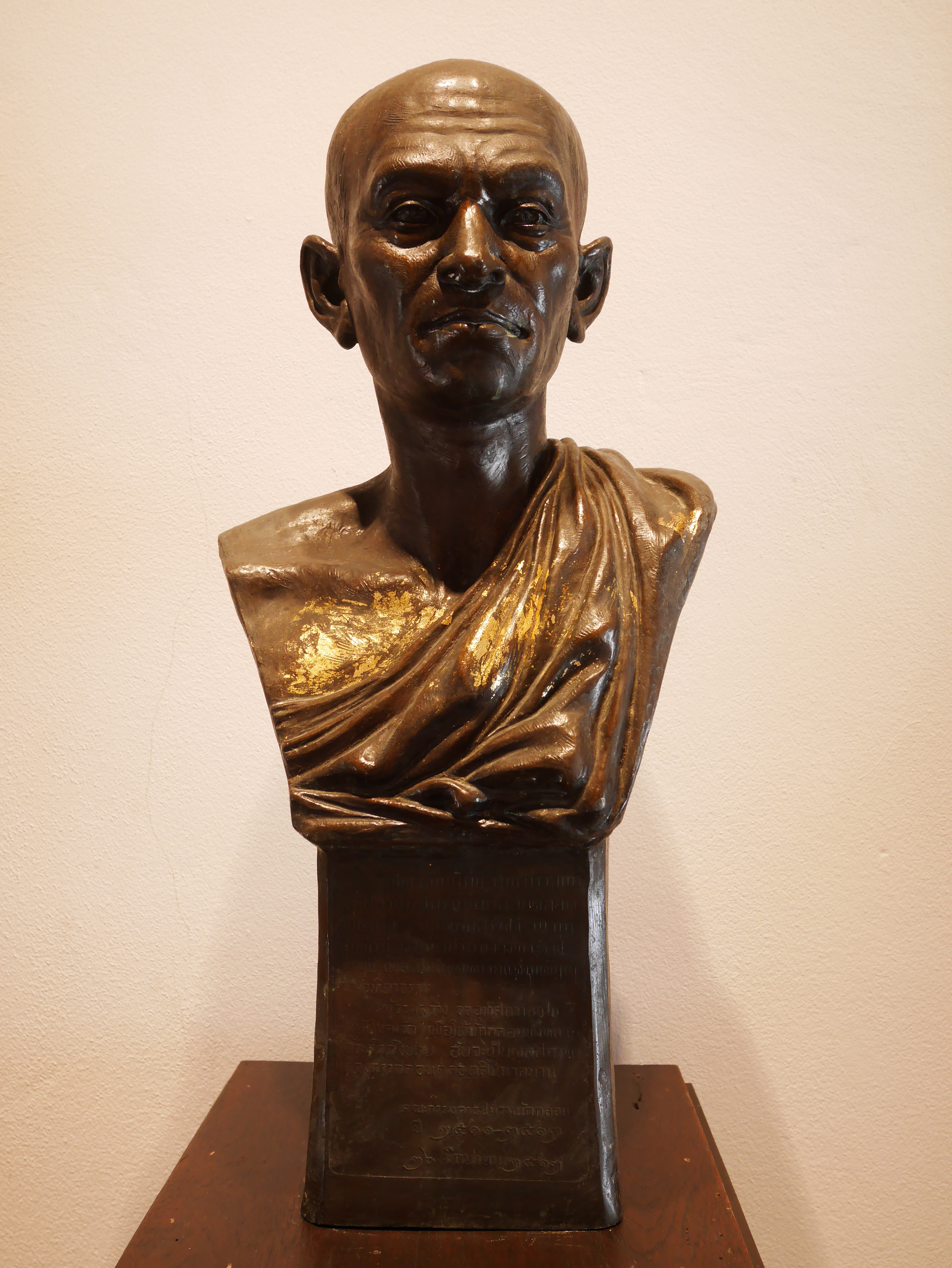
- Statue of Sunthorn (Phu) at Wat Thepthidaram, Bangkok
- Born: Phu (ภู่); 26 June 1786; Bangkok Noi, Bangkok, Siam
- Died: 1855 (aged 69); Taling Chan, Bangkok, Siam
- Occupations: Scribe, poet
- Children: 3
- Writing career
- Pen name: Sunthorn Phu (สุนทรภู่)
- Language: Thai
- Genre: Fantasy or Historical
- Notable work: Phra Aphai Mani

Phra Sunthorn Vohara (Phu) (Thai: พระสุนทรโวหาร (ภู่), RTGS: Phra Sunthonwohan (Phu), pronounced [pʰá.sǔn.tʰɔ̄ːn.woː.hǎːn.pʰûː]; 26 June 1786 – 1855), known as Sunthorn Phu (Thai: สุนทรภู่, RTGS: Sunthonphu, pronounced [sǔn.tʰɔ̄ːn.pʰûː]), was a Thai poet. He is often referred to as the "Shakespeare of Thailand." Born four years after the founding of the Rattanakosin Kingdom, he entered royal service as a court scribe during the reign of King Rama II. After the King's death, he ordained as a monk for nearly 20 years before returning to government service near the end of King Rama III's reign. He served as a scribe to Prince Chuthamani, later known as Krom Khun Isaret Rangsan. During the reign of King Mongkut, he was promoted to the rank of Phra Sunthorn Vohara, Chief of the Department of Royal Scribes of the Front Palace, his final official position before his death.

Phu's career as a royal poet began in the reign of King Rama II, and when the king died, he resigned from the role and became a monk. Twenty years later, in the reign of King Rama III, he returned to court as a royal scribe, where he remained for the rest of his life.

Phu was renowned for composing verse, and his epic poetry is popular in Thailand to the present day. His works include Nirat Phukhao Thong, a collection of poems recounting his journey to the Golden Mountain; Nirat Suphan, his journey to Suphan Buri province; and the Phra Aphai Mani saga.

== Biography ==
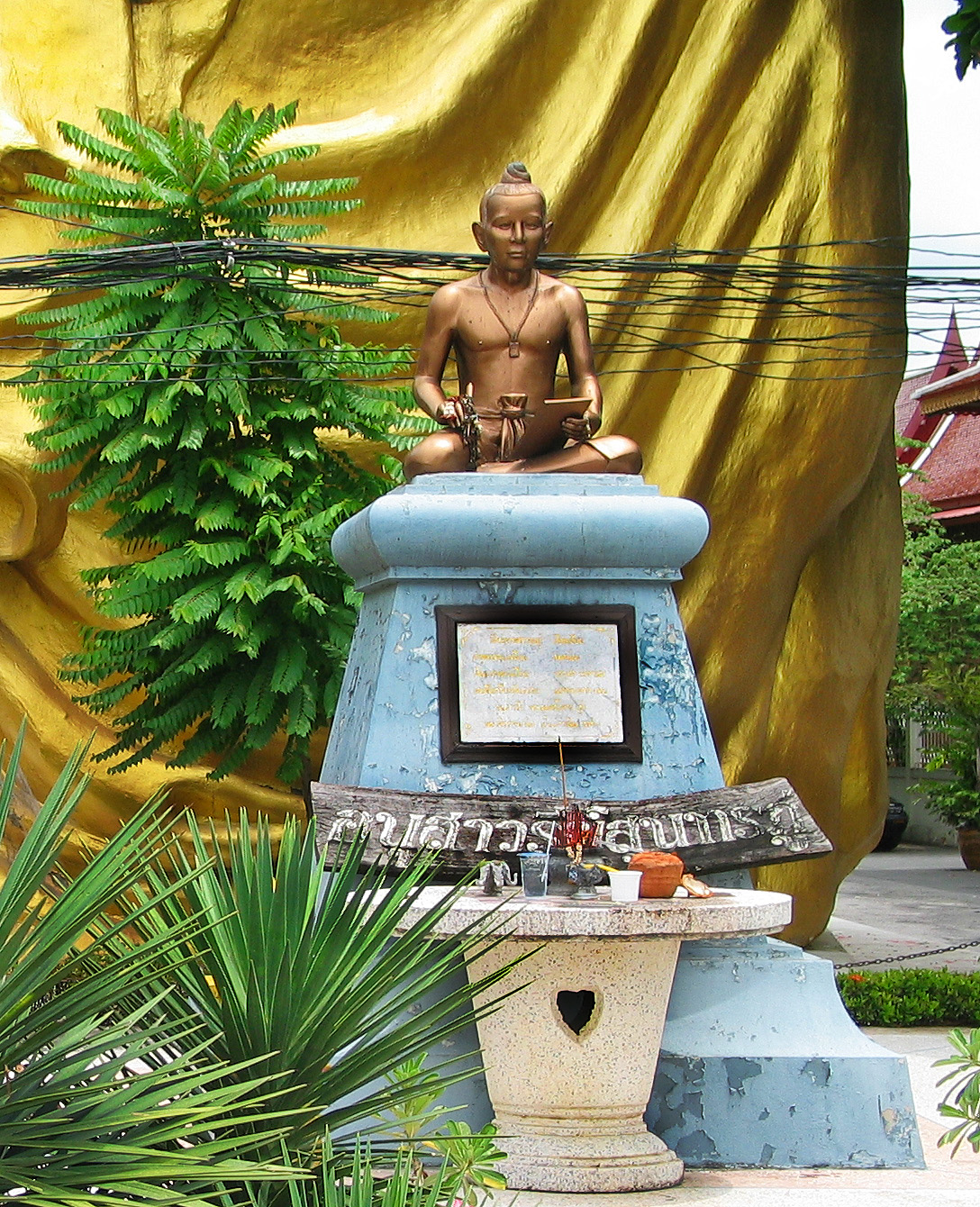
Memorial at Wat Si Sudaram, Bangkok

Sunthorn Phu was born in the reign of King Rama I, on 26 June 1786 (year of the Horse), around 8.00 a.m. His family's house was behind the royal palace, near the present day Bangkok Noi railway station and Wang Lang Market. It is generally understood that his father was from Ban Kram, Klaeng district, Rayong province, but in the belief of a new generation of historians that in fact his father was of Brahmin lineage from Ban Samo Phlue, Ban Lat district in Phetchaburi province today.

At the time the epic poet was born, Bangkok had been established as the Thai capital just four years earlier, founding the Rattanakosin era which continues to the present day.

His father and mother divorced. His father became a monk at Ban Kram temple. His mother became a wet nurse for the royal family. Phu had an opportunity to work in the palace with his mother, where he fell in love with a lady in the palace named Chan, who was related to the royal family. The couple were arrested and punished as their relationship violated the traditional social order, but they were pardoned on the king's death.

Phu later returned to Rayong to visit his father, and wrote a poem about the journey called Nirat Mueang Klaeng which became one of his most famous poems. He wrote the epic poem for his fiancée, Chan. After he returned to the palace in Bangkok he married Chan, and they had a son named Phat. It was at this time that King Rama II appointed him court poet. However, the couple were not married long, divorcing after Phu had an affair with another woman. This was the first of many marriages ending in divorce, although he later professed that the wife he had loved the most was Chan. Phu became an alcoholic, and, around 1821, was jailed after a fight.

He began the poem, Phra Aphai Mani in prison, and published it in installments over the next twenty years. The epic tale follows the title character, Prince Aphai Mani, a Byronic hero, in his romantic adventures throughout ancient Thailand.

King Rama II was so pleased with Phu's poetry that he awarded him the title of "Khun". During the reign of King Rama III, however, Phu made the grave mistake of publicly correcting one of the king's poems, and was stripped of his title as punishment. After this disgrace, he initially entered the Buddhist priesthood, but later became a merchant.

During the reign of King Rama IV, Phu came into the service of viceroy (or vice-king) Pinklao as head of the Front Palace's Royal Scribes Department, and was awarded the title of "Phra". He died in 1855 at a house by the Khlong Chak Phra canal near Wat Rae Rai temple in Taling Chan district, Bangkok.

== Legacy ==
Sunthorn left behind a legacy of poems that have become famous over time because of their description of Thai history. In 1986, the 200th anniversary of his birth, Sunthorn Phu was honored by UNESCO as a great world poet. His Phra Aphai Mani poems describe a fantastical world, where people of all races and religions live and interact together in harmony.

Recently, his literary works have been adapted in various media such as comics, films and songs. Thai cinema's first and only cel-animated cartoon feature film, The Adventure of Sudsakorn (1979), was based on a character from Phra Aphai Mani. It was directed by Payut Ngaokrachang. A live-action version of the tale was made in 2006, titled Legend of Sudsakorn.

Monuments of two characters from his epic work, Phra Aphai Mani have been erected on Ko Samet's Hat Sai Kaeo beach, the title character, Prince Aphai Mani, and the siren/mermaid character.

=== Memorial ===
A memorial to Sunthorn Phu was elected in Klaeng district, Rayong province, the birthplace of his father. His birthday, 26 June, is celebrated in Thailand as Sunthorn Phu Day.

Sunthorn Phu Memorial Park is a 33.15 acre facility. The foundation stone was set on 30 December 1955 by Prime Minister Pibulsongkram, but construction stopped for 10 years, until 1968. The Rayong Governor at that time was Vithya Kasetsaowapak who donated 962,766.10 baht to purchase the land. It was completed on 5 March 1970 and had its official opening on 25 May 1970.

The memorial sits on a hillside. Three sculptures surround the statue of Sunthorn Phu. The other sculptures represent the main characters in his literary works, including Prince Aphai Mani, the ocean butterfly, and the mermaid. Sukij Laidej created the Phu statue. Gaisorn Srisuwan sculpted Aphai Mani. Saroj Jaruc carved the mermaid, and Thana Laohathaikul executed the ocean butterfly.

== In popular culture ==
- Portrayed by Nimit Lugsamepong in the 2022 Thai film Love Destiny: The Movie.
- Portrayed by Penpetch Benyakul in the 2023 CH3HD TV series Royal Doctor.
- Portrayed by Jakkrit Yompayorm in the 2023 Thai PBS TV series Bussaba Lui Fai.
- Portrayed by Anuchyd Sapanphong in the 2024–2025 Thai PBS TV series Mhom Ped Sawan.
