= Phra Aphai Mani =

Epic poem written by Sunthorn Phu

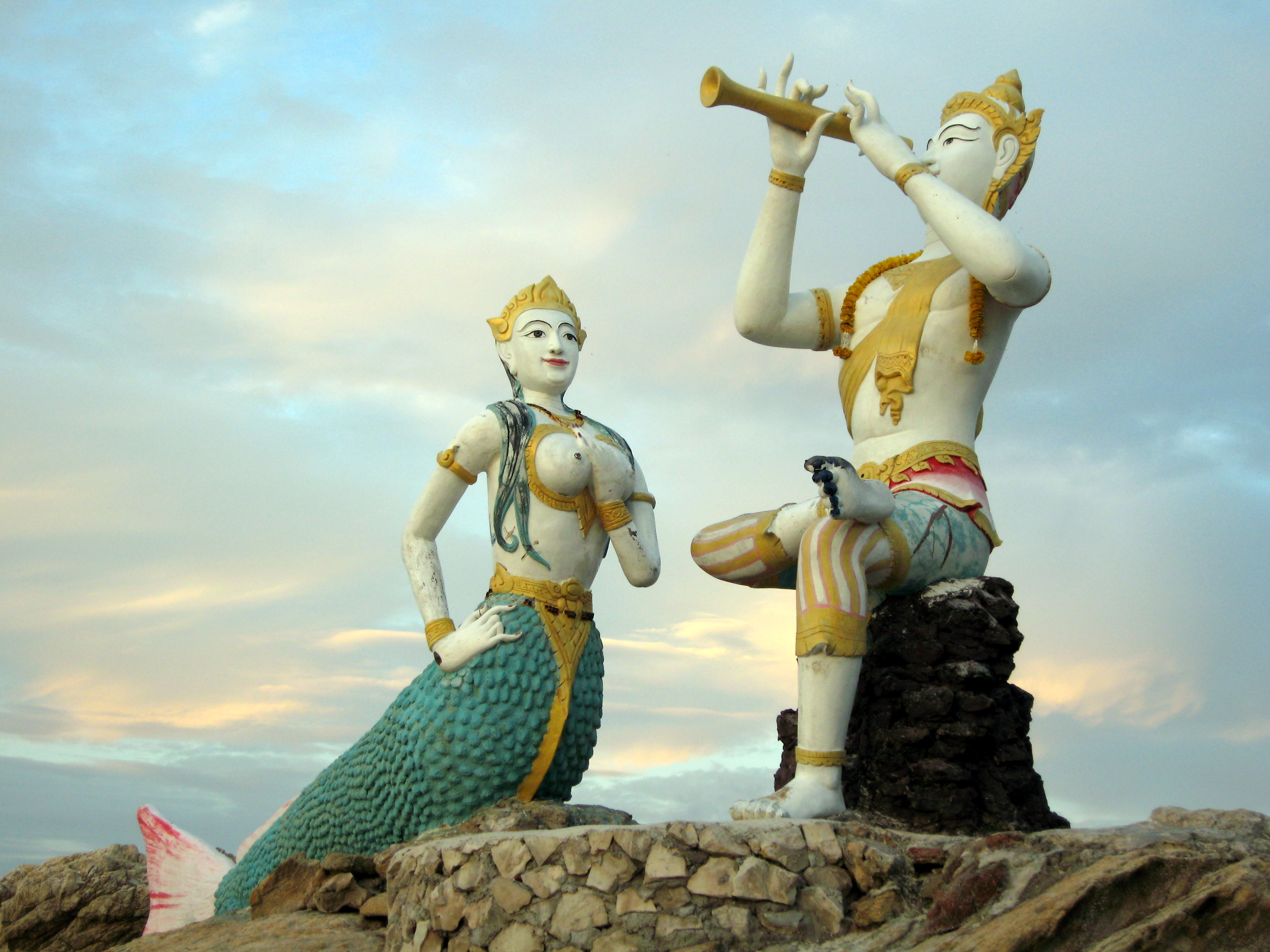
- Phra Aphai Mani (right) and the mermaid (left) statue on Koh Samet
- Author: Sunthorn Phu
- Original title: พระอภัยมณี
- Language: Thai
- Genre: Epic poem
- Published: 1870 (finished 1844)
- Publication place: Thailand
- Media type: samut thai
- Pages: 1422 (unbridged)

Phra Aphai Mani is a 48,700-line epic poem composed by Thai poet Sunthorn Phu, who is known as "the Bard of Rattanakosin" (Thai: กวีเอกแห่งกรุงรัตนโกสินทร์) (Note: This honorific title applied to Phu is a play on the "Bard of Avon" title applied to William Shakespeare.). It is considered to be one of Thailand's national epics. With 48,686 couplets, it is listed as the longest Thai single poem. Suthorn Phu started working on this epic fantasy in 1822 and finished it 22 years later in 1844. It is one of the most well-known stories of Thai folklore, and has been heavily adapted into films and comics. The main protagonists are Prince Aphai Mani, the mermaid, and the Phisuea Samut, a sea ogress who can transmute herself into a beautiful girl.

Although Phra Aphai Mani contains many mythical creatures and supra-natural protagonists, its major difference from other Thai epics is that it was an original creation of Sunthorn Phu himself, unlike his other poems, which are based on well-known folk stories like Khun Chang Khun Phaen. Moreover, Phra Aphai Mani was composed during the period of western colonization of Southeast Asia, and as a result, many parts of the story include characters of European ancestry, from mercenaries to pirates. Some Thai literary critics believe that Sunthorn Phu composed Phra Aphai Mani as an anti-colonialist tale, disguised as a versified tale of fantasy adventures.

== Synopsis ==
Phra Aphai Mani (พระอภัยมณี) (shortened to Aphai) and his brother, Sri Suwan (ศรีสุวรรณ), are the princes of Rattana. Their father sends them to study abroad, wishing to let them enthrone after he passes away. Sri Suwan masters the martial art of sword fighting, whilst Phra Aphai Mani masters playing a magical flute called Pi (ปี่) that either puts people to sleep or kills them. When they return home, their father is infuriated by the fact that what they learned was not useful for rulers, as he expected, and so he expels them from the kingdom.

They arrived by the shore and befriended three hermit brothers, Mora, Sanon, and Vishian. One day, while Aphai's companions were lulled to sleep by the sound of his flute, a female ogress named Phisuea Samut (นางผีเสื้อสมุทร) came and took Aphai away to her cave. She disguised herself as a beautiful maiden to live with him. Aphai knew all along that the woman was an ogress in disguise, but he was unable to escape. Aphai and Phisuea Samut lived together and gave birth to their son, Sin Samut (สินสมุทร).

On the other hand, his brother and comrades couldn't find him, so they set out on a journey to search for Aphai. They arrived at a kingdom named Romachakra that is caught in a war with neighboring kingdoms. Sri Suwan soon fell in love with the Princess of Romachakra, Ketsara (เกษรา). The two of them got married after he saved the kingdom, and Sri Suwan became the King of Romachakra. They had a daughter together named Arun Ratsami (อรุณรัศมี).

For eight years, Aphai was sealed away from the outside world until one day his half-ogre son moved the boulder at the entrance of the cave to go play outside. Sin Samut brought home an elderly merman. The elderly merman pleaded for his life and promised that he would come back to help him escape as long as they let him go. Hearing this, he revealed the truth about his mother to his son, and they planned to escape together. Aphai tricked Phisuea Samut into going to meditate on a distant island and fasting for three days. He was assisted by a family of elderly mermen, a father, mother, and daughter. The father and mother were caught and eaten by the ogress. The mermaid daughter took Aphai and Sin Samut to Koh Kaeo Phitsadan (เกาะแก้วพิสดาร, lit: “Bizarre Crystal Island”) where a ruesee (ฤาษี, “hermit”) warded the ogress away. Aphai courted the mermaid, who partially helped him escape, and had a son, named Sud Sakhon (สุดสาคร).

One day, King Silarat (ท้าวสิลราช) and Princess Suwanmali (สุวรรณมาลี) of Phareuk (ผลึก), passed by the island where Aphai lived. The princess was about to be married to a foreign prince, Usaren (อุศเรน) of Lanka. Aphai fell in love with the princess at first sight, so he encouraged his son to get adopted by her so they'd be closer. Aphai and Sin Samut asked to join the ship in order to get home, but the ogress saw them and got infuriated, calling forth storms and spirits, attacking them, and killing King Silarat. Aphai managed to escape and found himself on a shore. He played his magic flute, which killed the ogress by breaking her heart and petrifying her. Afterwards, he met Prince Usaren, who was looking for his fiancée.

Meanwhile, Sin Samut, escaping the ogress, swam with the princess Suwanmali to an island, where they were then rescued by a fleet of pirates. The captain of the pirates, Surang (สุหรัง) wanted to take Suwanmali as his wife, so he tried to kill Sin Samut multiple times. Enraged, Sin Samut beheaded him with an axe and became the new captain of the ship. He decided to raid a nearby kingdom for supplies and ran into his uncle, Sri Suwan, and his daughter. Together, they went in search of Aphai. When they found Aphai and Usaren safe, the princess Suwanmali refused to be engaged to Usaren, which caused the two parties to fight, and Prince Usaren fled to his homeland of Lanka.

Aphai later moved to the kingdom of Pharuek, where the queen asked him to enthrone the next king. Angry at Phra Aphai for giving her up to Usaren, Princess Suwanmali fled and became a nun in a monastery. But, with the help of her own maid; Walee (นางวาลี), Suwanmali decided to leave the nunhood and marry Aphai. They had twin daughters named Soisuwan (สร้อยสุวรรณ) and Chanthasuda (จันทสุดา).

Meanwhile, the half-mermaid prince, Sud Sakhon, who was about 3 years old, traveled to Phareuk in search of his father. While he was still living in the island, a hermit taught him magic and helped him tame a wild dragon horse before naming it Ma Nil Mangkorn (ม้านิลมังกร). Sud Sakhon and Ma Nil Mangkorn traveled together, defeating evil spirits and monsters along the way, before meeting a naked hermit (ชีเปลือย) who took him in as his apprentice before tricking the poor boy and pushing him down a cliff. The naked hermit stole the horse and his staff and galloped into a nearby kingdom and claimed that he was a great sage who owned this dragon horse. Ma Nil Mangkorn, fed up with this hermit's arrogance and trickery, pushed him off and went back to his master. Sud Sakhon, who had been passed out for three days and was starving, told his horse to quickly go ask the hermit by the Koh Kaeo Phitsadan for help. The hermit came to rescue Sud Sakhon from the cliff and lectured him, telling the boy to never trust humans as you never know what their true intentions may be. He traveled to the kingdom the hermit was staying in to expose his lies. Amazed by the boy, the king adopted him as his own son. A few years later, joined by his adoptive siblings, Saowakon (เสาวคนธ์) and Hasachai (หัสไชย), Sud Sakhon continued his journey to find his long lost father.

Years later, Usaren and his father attacked the kingdom of Pharuek. Usaren's father was killed, as was Usaren, who died from being heartbroken by learning that Suwanmali married Aphai. The throne of Lanka later fell to Usaren's younger sister, Laweng (นางละเวง). The beautiful blonde-haired Laweng decided to take revenge for her father and brother after being persuaded by the sages. She proclaimed to all neighboring cities; whoever kills Aphai of Phareuk, she will grant them a son and her kingdom of Lanka, using her dark magic to charm them with her picture given to the king of each kingdom. The family, now reunited, fought the intruders off. Aphai came across the jinxed picture of Laweng and got charmed by her, making him unable to fight and joining her side. Laweng saw this as her chance and slept with Aphai before sending her adoptive daughters Rampasahari (รำภาสะหรี), Yupaphaka (ยุพาผกา), and Sulaliwan (สุลาลีวัน) to charm the rest of Aphai's army who were sent to rescue him. Sri Suwan, Sin Samut, and Sud Sakhon were all under the spell and were unable to leave Lanka. The women then had to take over the role of commanders and charged forth to rescue them, before the issue was solved by Hasachai, who came and rid them of the curse. The kings all agreed to live in peace after the hermit came and stopped the war between the kingdoms. A marriage between Sin Samut and Arun Ratsami was arranged. Saowakon, however, still refused to marry Sud Sakhon because she felt humiliated to marry a man who had already slept with another woman and fled to a nearby Kingdom. Sud Sakhon chased after her, and after reconciling, the two of them got engaged.

Many years later, Aphai's father, the King of Rattana, died. A funeral was held before Rattana Kingdom became a part of Phareuk. Aphai and Laweng's son, Mangkala, became the new king of Lanka. Mangkala was tricked by the advisors into taking revenge on his grandfather and uncle by starting a rebellion against his father. He kidnapped a few members of the family and held them captive, including Suwanmali. After Sin Samut, Sud Sakhon, and Hasachai tried to stop him, Aphai and Sri Suwan stepped in to stop him. At the end of the war, Aphai divided the land equally among all of his heirs before becoming a monk, joined by his two wives: Suwanmali and Laweng.

As for the mermaid, there exists a version of the story where she became a human after meditating and diligently collecting good karma. Seeing her determination, Indra (พระอินทร์) granted her a boon and transformed her into a woman. The hermit then gave her the name "Chantawadee" (จันทวดีพันปีหลวง) and finally, Chantawadee joined her son and lived happily on the land.

== Composition, innovations, and (possible) influences ==
The cover of Phra Aphai Mani published by the National Library in 1963 (abridged)

The epic tale of Phra Aphai Mani is a truly massive work of poetry in klon suphap (Thai: กลอนสุภาพ). The unabridged version published by the National Library is 48,686-Bāt (2-line couplet) long, totaling over 600,000 words, and spanning 132 samut Thai books - by far the single longest poem in the Thai language, and is the world's second longest epic poem written by a single poet (the longest being the Iranian epic Shahnameh). Sunthorn Phu, however, originally intended to end the story at the point where Phra Aphai abdicates the throne and retires into the wood. This leaves his original vision of the work at 25,098 lines of poetry - spanning 64 samut thai books. But his literary patron wanted him to continue composing, which he did for many years until it reached final length. Today, the abridged version - i.e. his original 64 samut-thai volumes, totaling 25,098 couplets of poetry - is regarded as the authoritative text of the epic. It took Sunthorn Phu more than 20 years to compose (from around 1822 or 1823 to 1844).

Phra Aphai Mani is Sunthorn Phu's Chef-d'œuvre. It breaks the tradition of earlier Thai poetic novels or nithan kham-klon (Thai: นิทานคำกลอน) by including western contemporary inventions, such as steam-powered ships (Thai: สำเภายนต์) which only started to appear in Europe. Sunthorn Phu also writes about a mechanical music player at the time when a gramophone or a self-playing piano was yet to be invented. This made Phra Aphai Mani surprisingly futuristic for the time. Also, unlike other classical Thai epic poems, Phra Aphai Mani depicts various exploits of white mercenaries and pirates which reflected the ongoing colonization of Southeast Asia in the early 19th Century. Phra Aphai himself is said to have learned "to speak Farang (European), Chinese and Cham languages." Moreover, the locations of cities and islands in Phra Aphai Mani are not imagined but actually correspond to real geographical locations in the Andaman Sea as well as east of the Indian Ocean. Sunthorn Phu also gives an accurate knowledge of modern sea voyage in that part of the world. This suggests that the Thai Bard (Sunthorn Phu) must have acquired these knowledge from foreign seafarers first-handedly. The multi-cultural and the half-mythical, half-realistic setting of Phra Aphai Mani - combined with Sunthorn Phu's poetical brilliance - makes Phra Aphai Mani a unique literary masterpiece.

=== Phra Aphai Mani as the Siamese Odyssey ===
European colonial powers had been expanding their influence and presence into Southeast Asia when Sunthorn Phu was composing Phra Aphai Mani. Many Thai literary critics have thus suggested that Sunthorn Phu may have intended his epic masterpiece to be an anti-colonialist tale, disguised as a versified tale of fantasy adventures. In a literary sense, however, Phra Aphai Mani has been suggested by other Thai academics as being inspired by Greek epics and Persian literature, notably the Iliad, the Odyssey, the Argonauts, and One Thousand and One Nights.

The structure of Phra Aphai Mani conforms to the monomyth structure, shared by other great epic stories in the Greek and Persian tradition. It is possible that Sunthorn Phu may have learned these epic stories from European missionaries, Catholic priests, or learned individuals who travelled to Siam during the early-19th century. Phra Aphai, the protagonist, resembles Orpheus—the famed musician of the Argonauts—rather than an Achilles-like warrior. Moreover, Phra Aphai's odyssean journey conjures similarity with the King of Ithaca's famous journey across the Aegean.

Pii Sue Samut ("the sea butterfly"), a love-struck female titan who kidnaps the hero, is reminiscent of the nymph Calypso. Also, much like Odysseus, Phra Aphai's long voyage enables him to speak many languages and to discern the minds and customs of many foreign races. Phra Aphai's name (Thai: อภัย: 'to forgive') is pronounced quite similar to how "Orpheus" (Greek: Ὀρφεύς) is pronounced in Greek. In addition, Nang Laweng's bewitching beauty, so captivating it drives nations to war, seems to match the reputation of Helen of Troy. Others have suggested that Nang Laweng may have been inspired by a story of a Christian princess, as recounted in Persia's Thousand and One Nights, who falls in love with a Muslim king.

All of this suggests that Sunthorn Phu was a Siamese bard who used both the knowledge of contemporary seafaring and Western invention and stories of Greek classical epics. He became the first Thai writer to draw inspirations from Western literary sources and produces an epic based, loosely, upon an amalgamation of those myths and legends.

== Phra Aphai Mani in modern popular culture ==
There have been some Thai films which are based on this popular legend, including The Adventure of Sudsakorn and Legend of Sudsakorn. There has also been a Thai comic series produced with the name Apaimanee Saga, also based on the tale. In some regions in Thailand, such as the Ko Samet island and Puek Tian beach, there are statues erected which are related to the Phra Aphai Mani story. A ballad with some kind of a similar story exists in Sweden: Herr Mannelig.

== See also ==
- Sudsakorn, the son of Phra Aphai Mani and a mermaid.
