= 2006 in Japanese television =

Events in 2006 in Japanese television.

== Channels ==
Launches:

- April 1 - KBS World

== Debuts ==
Show	Station	Premiere date	Genre	Original run
.hack//Roots	TV Tokyo	April 5	anime	April 5, 2006 - September 27, 2006
Bakegyamon	TV Tokyo	April 3	anime	April 3, 2006 - March 26, 2007
Black Lagoon	Chiba TV	April 8	anime	April 8, 2006 – June 24, 2006
Black Lagoon: The Second Barrage	Sendai TV	October 2	anime	October 2, 2006 – December 18, 2006
Buso Renkin	TV Tokyo	October 5	anime	October 5, 2006 - March 29, 2007
Code Geass: Lelouch of the Rebellion	MBS	October 5	anime	October 5, 2006 - March 29, 2007
D.Gray-Man	TV Tokyo	October 3	anime	October 3, 2006 – September 30, 2008
Dare Yorimo Mama wo Ai su	TBS	July 2	drama	July 2, 2006 - September 10, 2006
Demashita! Powerpuff Girls Z	TV Tokyo	July 1	anime	July 1, 2006 - June 30, 2007
Digimon Savers	Fuji TV	April 2	anime	April 2, 2006 - March 25, 2007
Fushigiboshi no Futagohime Gyu!	TV Tokyo	April 1	anime	April 1, 2006 – March 31, 2007
Futari wa Pretty Cure Splash Star	ABC TV	February 5	anime	February 5, 2006 – January 28, 2007
Gintama	TV Tokyo	April 4	anime	April 4, 2006 - March 25, 2010
GoGo Sentai Boukenger	TV Asahi	February 19	tokusatsu	February 19, 2006 – February 11, 2007
Hataraki Man	Fuji TV	October 12	anime	October 12, 2006 - December 21, 2006
Kamen Rider Kabuto	TV Asahi	January 29	tokusatsu	January 29, 2006 – January 21, 2007
Kanon	BS-i	October 5	anime	October 5, 2006 - March 15, 2007
Kenichi: The Mightiest Disciple	TV Tokyo	October 7	anime	October 7, 2006 – September 29, 2007
Kirarin Revolution	TV Tokyo	April 7	anime	April 7, 2006 - March 28, 2008
Lion-Maru G	TV Tokyo	October 1	tokusatsu	October 1, 2006 - November 24, 2006
Madan Senki Ryukendo	TV Aichi	January 8	tokusatsu	January 8, 2006 – December 31, 2006
Mamotte! Lollipop	TV Setouchi	July 1	anime	July 1, 2006 - September 23, 2006
Ouran High School Host Club	Nippon TV	April 4	anime	April 4, 2006 – September 26, 2006
Rockman EXE Beast+	TV Tokyo	April 8	anime	April 8, 2006 - September 30, 2006
Pocket Monsters Diamond & Pearl	TV Tokyo	September 28	anime	September 28, 2006 - September 9, 2010
Ryusei no Rockman	TV Tokyo	October 7	anime	October 7, 2006 – October 27, 2007
Saiyūki	Fuji TV	January 9	drama	January 9, 2006 - March 20, 2006
School Rumble: 2nd Semester	TV Tokyo	April 2	anime	April 2, 2006 - September 24, 2006
Sumomomo Momomo: The Strongest Bride on Earth	TV Asahi	October 5	anime	October 5, 2006 - March 15, 2007
Tama & Friends: Search! The Magic Puni-Puni Stone	Animax	May 6	anime	May 6, 2006 - November 4, 2006
Ultraman Mebius	CBC	April 8	tokusatsu	April 8, 2006 – March 31, 2007
xxxHolic	TBS	April 6	animePsalms of Planets Eureka seveN	April 6, 2006 - September 28, 2006

== Ongoing shows ==
- Music Fair, music (1964-present)
- Mito Kōmon, jidaigeki (1969-2011)
- Sazae-san, anime (1969-present)
- FNS Music Festival, music (1974-present)
- Panel Quiz Attack 25, game show (1975-present)
- Soreike! Anpanman. anime (1988-present)
- Downtown no Gaki no Tsukai ya Arahende!!, game show (1989-present)
- Crayon Shin-chan, anime (1992-present)
- Shima Shima Tora no Shimajirō, anime (1993-2008)
- Nintama Rantarō, anime (1993-present)
- Chibi Maruko-chan, anime (1995-present)
- Detective Conan, anime (1996-present)
- SASUKE, sports (1997-present)
- Ojarumaru, anime (1998-present)
- One Piece, anime (1999–present)
- MÄR, anime (2005-2007)
- Naruto, anime (2002–2007)
- Yu-Gi-Oh! Duel Monsters GX, anime (2004-2008)
- Sgt. Frog, anime (2004-2011)
- Bleach, anime (2004-2012)
- Eyeshield 21, anime (2005-2008)
- Kitty's Paradise PLUS, children's variety (2005-2008)
- Doraemon, anime (2005-present)

== Resuming ==
Show	Station	Ending date	Genre	Original run
Tsubasa Chronicle	NHK	April 29	anime	April 29, 2006 - November 4, 2006

== Endings ==
Show	Station	Ending date	Genre	Original run
Black Cat	TBS	March 30	anime	October 6, 2005 – March 30, 2006
Black Lagoon	Chiba TV	June 24	anime	April 8, 2006 – June 24, 2006
Black Lagoon: The Second Barrage	Sendai TV	December 18	anime	October 2, 2006 – December 18, 2006
Dare Yorimo Mama wo Ai su	TBS	July 2	drama	July 2, 2006 - September 10, 2006
Fushigiboshi no Futagohime	TV Tokyo	March 25	anime	April 2, 2005 – March 25, 2006
Futari wa Pretty Cure Max Heart	TV Asahi	January 29	anime	February 6, 2005 – January 29, 2006
Garo	TV Tokyo	March 31	tokusatsu	October 7, 2005 – March 31, 2006
Initial D Fourth Stage	Sky PerfecTV!	February 18	anime	April 17, 2004 – February 18, 2006
Kamen Rider Hibiki	TV Asahi	January 22	tokusatsu	January 30, 2005 – January 22, 2006
Konjiki no Gash Bell!!	Fuji TV	March 26	anime	April 6, 2003 – March 26, 2006
Lion-Maru G	TV Tokyo	November 24	tokusatsu	October 1, 2006 - November 24, 2006
Madan Senki Ryukendo	TV Aichi	December 31	tokusatsu	January 8, 2006 – December 31, 2006
Mahou Sentai Magiranger	TV Asahi	February 12	tokusatsu	February 13, 2005 – February 12, 2006
Mamotte! Lollipop	TV Setouchi	September 23	anime	July 1, 2006 - September 23, 2006
Ouran High School Host Club	Nippon TV	September 26	anime	April 4, 2006 – September 26, 2006
Rockman EXE Beast	TV Tokyo	April 1	anime	October 1, 2005 - April 1, 2006
Rockman EXE Beast+	TV Tokyo	September 30	anime	April 8, 2006 - September 30, 2006
Pocket Monsters Advanced Generation	TV Tokyo	September 14	anime	November 21, 2002 - September 14, 2006
Psalms of Planets Eureka SeveN	MBS	April 2	anime	April 17, 2005 - April 2, 2006
Saiyūki	Fuji TV	March 20	drama	January 9, 2006 - March 20, 2006
School Rumble: 2nd Semester	TV Tokyo	September 24	anime	April 2, 2006 - September 24, 2006
Shuffle!	WOWOW	January 5	anime	July 7, 2005 – January 5, 2006
Tama & Friends: Search! The Magic Puni-Puni Stone	Animax	November 4	anime	May 6, 2006 - November 4, 2006
Tottoko Hamtaro: Ham Ham Paradise!	TV Tokyo	March 31	anime	April 2, 2004 - March 31, 2006
Tsubasa Chronicle	NHK	November 4	anime	April 29, 2006 - November 4, 2006
Ultraman Max	CBC	April 1	tokusatsu	July 2, 2005 – April 1, 2006
xxxHolic	TBS	April 6	anime	April 6, 2006 - September 28, 2006

== See also ==
- 2006 in anime
- 2006 Japanese television dramas
- 2006 in Japan
- List of Japanese films of 2006
