= 2006 in animation =

2006 in animation is an overview of notable events, including notable awards, list of films released, television show debuts and endings, and notable deaths.

== Events ==
=== January ===
- January 6: Season 5 of The Grim Adventures of Billy & Mandy begins on Cartoon Network with the premiere of the episodes "Billy Ocean/Hill Billy".
- January 29: The Family Guy episode "Patriot Games" premieres on Fox, the sub-plot where Stewie constantly beats up Brian while asking for money became one of the show's most iconic scenes.

=== February ===
- February 4: The 33rd Annie Awards are held.
- February 24: My Gym Partner's a Monkey premieres after airing its sneak peek on 26 December 2005.

=== March ===
- March 5: 78th Academy Awards:
  - Wallace & Gromit: The Curse of the Were-Rabbit directed by Nick Park and Steve Box wins Best Animated Feature.
  - The Moon and the Son: An Imagined Conversation directed by John Canemaker and Peggy Stern wins Best Animated Short Film.
- March 14: The first episode of Lola & Virginia airs.
- March 15: Christian Volckman's Renaissance premieres.
- March 17: Season 2 of Avatar: The Last Airbender begins on Nickelodeon with the premiere of the episode "The Avatar State". The season's premiere was seen by 3.7 million viewers that night.
- March 22: Season 10 of South Park begins on Comedy Central with the premiere of the episode "The Return of Chef", in which the titular episode character dies.
- March 24: Foster's Home for Imaginary Friends concludes its third season on Cartoon Network with the episode "Cuckoo for Coco Cards".
- March 31: Blue Sky Studios releases Ice Age: The Meltdown, directed by Carlos Saldanha.

=== April ===
- April 9: The Simpsons episode "Kiss Kiss, Bang Bangalore" premieres on, in which the family travels to India.
- April 11: Winnie the Pooh receives a star at the Hollywood Walk of Fame.
- April 14:
  - Walt Disney Pictures' The Wild premieres. It was universally panned for its improper CG imagery and writing and was explicitly compared to DreamWorks Animation's Madagascar.
  - Paul Laurence Robertson's Pirate Baby's Cabana Battle Street Fight 2006 is released online.
- April 28: Season 4 of Foster's Home for Imaginary Friends begins on Cartoon Network with the premiere of the episode "Challenge of the Super Friends".

=== May ===
- May 14:
  - King of the Hill concludes its tenth season on Fox with the episode "Edu-macating Lucky". The episode was seen by over 5.1 million viewers that night.
  - American Dad! concludes its second season on Fox with the episode "Tears of a Clooney". The episode was seen by over 6.8 million viewers that night.
- May 19:
  - Tim Johnson and Karey Kirkpatrick's Over the Hedge premieres.
  - Decode Entertainment and the Halifax Film Company merge to form DHX Media.
- May 21:
- The Simpsons concludes its 17th season on Fox with the episode "Marge and Homer Turn a Couple Play". The episode was seen by just over 8.2 million viewers that night.
- The following Family Guy episodes premiere on Fox (thus concluding the fourth season of the show):
  - "Stewie B. Goode" (watched by 8.2 million viewers)
  - "Bango Was His Name-O" (watched by over 7.8 million viewers)
  - "Stu and Stewie's Excellent Adventure" (watched by over 8.1 million viewers)
    - These episodes were originally released altogether on the Stewie Griffin: The Untold Story DVD.
- May 25: Richard Linklater's A Scanner Darkly premieres.

=== June ===
- June 9:
  - Disney/Pixar's Cars premieres in theaters to positive reviews from both critics and audiences; praising its stunning visuals, humor, and relatable themes like friendship and humility.
  - Danny Phantom concludes its second season on Nickelodeon with the extended two-part special "Reality Trip".
- June 16: 20th Century Fox's Garfield: A Tail of Two Kitties is released. Following its extremely negative reception alongside its unsuccessful predecessor, subsequent Garfield projects would return to animation.
- June 17: Peter Lord and David Sproxton, founders of Aardman Animations, receive a CBE.
- June 22: Happy Tree Friends episode "From A to Zoo, part 2" premieres on some MTV channel.
- June 27: The final episode of Hi Hi Puffy AmiYumi airs on Cartoon Network. The series is confirmed cancelled four months later, leaving 5 episodes unaired.
- Specific date unknown in June:
  - Garrett Gilchrist, filmmaker and artist, released The Thief and the Cobbler: The Recobbled Cut on the internet. It is a fan restoration of Richard Williams' unfinished work and was universally acclaimed over the terrible altered versions that were theatrically released in the 1990s.
  - Lola & Virginia premieres in the US on Animania HD.

=== July ===
- July 21:
  - Columbia Pictures' Monster House premieres. Despite its positive reception, it gained some infamy for its frightening content that was considered too dark for a less-restricted "PG rating".
  - Nickelodeon airs The Jimmy Timmy Power Hour 3: The Jerkinators. This marks the suspension of The Fairly OddParents as Butch Hartman originally ended production of the series until he reconsidered the sixth season after a year hiatus. This also marks the conclusion of The Adventures of Jimmy Neutron, Boy Genius due to the closure of DNA Productions. The final remaining episodes of both shows in general air on 25 November this year.
- July 29: Johnny Test concludes its first season on The WB (as part of the Kids' WB block) with the episodes "Johnny Dodgeball/Johnny & the Attack of the Monster Truck". This is the last episode to premiere on The WB as the network would go defunct on September 17, the show would move over to The CW for the premiere of its second season.

=== August ===
- August 9: The Grim Adventures of Billy & Mandy concludes its fifth season on Cartoon Network with the episodes "The Crass Unicorn/Billy & Mandy Begins".
- August 21: The first episode of Wow! Wow! Wubbzy! airs.
- August 22: The Tom and Jerry direct-to-video film Tom and Jerry: Shiver Me Whiskers releases on DVD.
- August 26: The first episode of Yin Yang Yo! airs.

=== September ===
- September 4: The first episode of Curious George airs and PBS Kids Preschool Block launches.
- September 9: Qubo launches as NBC's new block.
- September 10:
  - Season 18 of The Simpsons begins on Fox with the premiere of the episode "The Mook, the Chef, the Wife and Her Homer", which guest stars heavy metal band Metallica. The episode was seen by over 11.6 million viewers that night.
  - Season 3 of American Dad! begins on Fox with the premiere of the episode "Camp Refoogee". The episode was seen by 8.9 million viewers that night.
  - Season 5 of Family Guy begins on Fox with the premiere of the episode "Stewie Loves Lois". The episode was seen by over 9.9 million viewers that night.
- September 17: The Simpsons episode "Jazzy and the Pussycats" premieres, guest starring the White Stripes.
- September 19: The Scooby-Doo direct-to-video film Scooby-Doo! Pirates Ahoy! releases on DVD.
- September 23: Tom and Jerry Tales premieres on the Kids' WB block on The CW. This was the first Tom and Jerry series to be produced by Warner Bros. Animation after the closure of Hanna-Barbera studios from 5 years ago.
- September 25: The Happy Tree Friends TV season premieres on G4 in the United States, with the first three segments of episode 1.
- September 29: The first feature film produced by Sony Pictures Animation, Open Season, premieres.

=== October ===
- October 6: The 6th & final season of The Grim Adventures of Billy & Mandy begins on Cartoon Network with the premiere of the episodes "Everything Breaks/The Show That Dare Not Speak Its Name".
- October 9: The 3rd & final season of Danny Phantom begins on Nickelodeon with the premiere of the episode "Urban Jungle".
- October 28: Season 2 of Johnny Test begins on The CW (as part of the Kids' WB block) with the premiere of the episodes "Hoist the Johnny Roger/Johnny's Turbo Toy Force".

=== November ===
- November 3: Cartoon Network's Class of 3000 premieres.
- November 5: The Simpsons' "Treehouse of Horror XVII" premieres on Fox.
- November 7: Ryan Krzak releases an animated music video for the song "Albuquerque" by Weird Al Yankovic. It would later gain a cult following by 2024.
- November 14:
  - Bah, Humduck! A Looney Tunes Christmas releases on DVD. It is the second installment in the Looney Tunes franchise to be based on Charles Dickens' novel A Christmas Carol, following Friz Freleng's 1979 short Bugs Bunny's Christmas Carol.
  - 11th Animation Kobe is held.
- November 15: South Park concludes its tenth season on Comedy Central with the episode "Stanley's Cup".
- November 20: The Peanuts special He's a Bully, Charlie Brown premieres on ABC. It was the last Peanuts special to be aired on ABC and on television until Happiness Is a Warm Blanket, Charlie Brown on FOX 5 years later in 2011, and the last one to be created by Bill Melendez before his passing in 2008.
- November 23: Foster's Home for Imaginary Friends concludes its fourth season on Cartoon Network with the premiere of the television movie "Good Wilt Hunting".
- November 29: EuropaCorp's Arthur and the Minimoys by Luc Besson premieres in France and becomes the highest-grossing movie in its home country. The Weinstein Company would distribute the film as Arthur and the Invisibles two months later. The film was notoriously butchered for the western release, which received extremely negative reviews. Furthermore, Harvey Weinstein was blamed for forcing it to be "American".

=== December ===
- December 1: Avatar: The Last Airbender concludes its second season on Nickelodeon with the episodes "The Guru" and "The Crossroads of Destiny". The season's finale was seen by 4.4 million viewers that night.
- December 25: Episode 13 with last three segments of Happy Tree Friends TV season premieres, thus ending the TV series last original debut.
- December 17: The Family Guy episode "Barely Legal" premieres on Fox, this episode marked the debut of Stewie's iconic Cool Hwhip gag. It was seen by 8.91 million viewers that night.
- December 27: Early Abstractions is added to the National Film Registry.

=== Specific date unknown ===
- DNA Productions closes down.
- The pilot episode for Jimmy Two-Shoes was made, but was since refused to make any public appearances as it was deemed too dark and cynical to be marketed for the attended audiences.

== Awards ==
- Academy Award for Best Animated Feature: Wallace & Gromit: The Curse of the Were-Rabbit
- Academy Award for Best Animated Short Film: The Moon and the Sun
- Animation Kobe Feature Film Award: The Girl Who Leapt Through Time
- Annie Award for Best Animated Feature: Cars
- BAFTA Award for Best Animated Film: Happy Feet
- Goya Award for Best Animated Film: El Ratón Pérez
- Japan Academy Prize for Animation of the Year: The Girl Who Leapt Through Time
- Japan Media Arts Festival Animation Award: The Girl Who Leapt Through Time
- Mainichi Film Awards - Animation Grand Award: The Girl Who Leapt Through Time

== Films released ==
- January 7 - Origin: Spirits of the Past (Japan)
- January 17 - Live Freaky! Die Freaky! (United States)
- February 2 - Blood Tea and Red String (United States)
- February 7:
  - Bambi II (United States)
  - My Little Pony: The Princess Promenade (United States)
- February 10 - Curious George (United States)
- February 16 - Felix 2 – The Hare and the Verflixte Time Machine (Germany)
- February 17 - Impy's Island (Germany)
- February 21 - Ultimate Avengers (United States)
- February 23:
  - Fimfárum 2 (Czech Republic)
  - Prince Vladimir (Russia)
- February 24 - Doogal (France, United Kingdom, and United States)
- March 4:
  - Dieter – The Film (Germany)
  - Doraemon: Nobita's Dinosaur 2006 (Japan)
  - Mobile Suit Zeta Gundam: A New Translation III – Love is the Pulse of the Stars (Japan)
  - One Piece: The Giant Mechanical Soldier of Karakuri Castle (Japan)
- March 5 - Barbie: Mermaidia (United States)
- March 10 - Alexander the Great (Italy)
- March 11 - VeggieTales: Sheerluck Holmes and the Golden Ruler (United States)
- March 15:
  - Dobrynya Nikitich and Zmey Gorynych (Russia)
  - Renaissance (France, United Kingdom, and Luxembourg)
- March 21 - The Adventures of Brer Rabbit (United States)
- March 31 - Ice Age: The Meltdown (United States)
- April 8 - Amazing Lives of the Fast Food Grifters (Japan)
- April 11 - Bratz Genie Magic (United States)
- April 12 - Asterix and the Vikings (France and Denmark)
- April 14 - The Wild (United States and Canada)
- April 15:
  - Crayon Shin-chan: The Legend Called: Dance! Amigo! (Japan)
  - Detective Conan: The Private Eyes' Requiem (Japan)
- April 18 - Wood & Stock: Sexo, Orégano e Rock'n'Roll (Brazil)
- April 21:
  - Free Jimmy (Norway and United Kingdom)
  - A Movie Of Eggs (Mexico)
- April 28 - Manga Latina: Killer on the Loose (Canada and United Kingdom)
- April 30 - Barbie Diaries (United States)
- May 5 - Padre Pio (Italy)
- May 18 - The Blue Elephant (Thailand)
- May 19 - Over the Hedge (United States)
- May 26 - Mobile Suit Gundam SEED Destiny: Special Edition I – The Broken World (Japan)
- June 9 - Cars (United States)
- June 16 - Princess (Denmark and Germany)
- June 20 - Superman: Brainiac Attacks (United States)
- June 23 - Leroy & Stitch (United States)
- June 26 - Patoruzito: The Great Adventure (Argentina)
- June 28 - Aachi & Ssipak (South Korea)
- July 7:
  - A Scanner Darkly (United States)
  - Shark Bait (United States and South Korea)
- July 8 - Brave Story (Japan)
- July 12 - The Warrior (China)
- July 13 - Chika: The Rite of Perdition (United States)
- July 15:
  - The Girl Who Leapt Through Time (Japan)
  - Pokémon Ranger and the Temple of the Sea (Japan)
- July 16 - Queer Duck: The Movie (United States)
- July 21:
  - Kittu (India)
  - Monster House (United States)
- July 27:
  - Dragons: Destiny of Fire (Peru)
  - Mobile Suit Gundam SEED Destiny: Special Edition II – Respective Swords (Japan)
- July 28 - The Ant Bully (United States)
- July 29:
  - Tales from Earthsea (Japan)
  - VeggieTales: LarryBoy and the Bad Apple (United States)
- August - Especial (Russia)
- August 1:
  - Winnie the Pooh: Shapes & Sizes (United States)
  - Winnie the Pooh: Wonderful Word Adventure (United States)
- August 4:
  - Barnyard (United States and Germany)
  - Livin' It Up With Bratz (United States)
- August 5 - Naruto the Movie: Guardians of the Crescent Moon Kingdom (Japan)
- August 8:
  - City of Rott (United States)
  - Ultimate Avengers 2: Rise of the Panther (United States)
- August 11 - Codename: Kids Next Door: Operation Z.E.R.O (United States)
- August 22 - Tom and Jerry: Shiver Me Whiskers (United States)
- August 25 - Robotech: The Shadow Chronicles (United States)
- August 29 - Brother Bear 2 (United States)
- September 1:
  - Ghost in the Shell: Stand Alone Complex – Solid State Society (Japan)
  - Lotte from Gadgetville (Estonia and Latvia)
- September 6 - Franklin and the Turtle Lake Treasure (Canada and France)
- September 8 - The Emperor's Secret (Finland)
- September 10 - Barbie in the 12 Dancing Princesses (United States)
- September 12:
  - Bratz Babyz: The Movie (United States)
  - The Legend of Sasquatch (United States)
  - My Little Pony Crystal Princess: The Runaway Rainbow (United States)
  - Tony Hawk in Boom Boom Sabotage (United States)
- September 15:
  - Everyone's Hero (Canada and United States)
  - Teen Titans: Trouble in Tokyo (United States)
- September 19 - Scooby-Doo! Pirates Ahoy! (United States)
- September 21 - The Trip to Panama (Germany)
- September 26 - Bratz: Passion 4 Fashion Diamondz (United States)
- September 29:
  - Krishna (India)
  - Open Season (United States)
- October 2 - Mobile Suit Gundam SEED Destiny: Special Edition III – Flames Of Destiny (Japan)
- October 5 - The Little Bastard and the Old Fart: Death Sucks (Germany)
- October 6 - The Ugly Duckling and Me! (Denmark, United Kingdom, and France)
- October 7 - Strawberry Shortcake: The Sweet Dreams Movie (United States)
- October 11 - U (France)
- October 14 - Atagoal: Cat's Magical Forest (Japan)
- October 17 - John Paul II: The Friend of All Humanity (Vatican City and Spain)
- October 20 - Casper's Scare School (United States)
- October 25 - Azur & Asmar: The Princes' Quest (France, Belgium, Spain, and Italy)
- October 27 - Romeo & Juliet: Sealed with a Kiss (United States)
- October 28 - Hellboy Animated: Sword of Storms (United States)
- October 30 - Stonewall & Riot: The Ultimate Orgasm (United States)
- November 3 - Flushed Away (United Kingdom and United States)
- November 4:
  - Cristobal Coolumbus (Spain)
  - VeggieTales: Gideon: Tuba Warrior (United States)
- November 6 - A Christmas Carol: Scrooge's Ghostly Tale (United States)
- November 14:
  - Bah, Humduck! A Looney Tunes Christmas (United States)
  - PollyWorld (United States)
- November 17 - Happy Feet (United States and Australia)
- November 19 - Desmond & the Swamp Barbarian Trap (Sweden)
- November 25 - Paprika (Japan)
- November 29 - Arthur and the Invisibles (France)
- December 6 - The Land Before Time XII: The Great Day of the Flyers (United States)
- December 8 - Re-Animated (United States)
- December 8 - Pretty Cure Splash Star Tic-Tac Crisis Hanging by a Thin Thread! (Japan)
- December 12 - The Fox and the Hound 2 (United States)
- December 16:
  - Animal Crossing: The Movie (Japan)
  - Bleach: Memories of Nobody (Japan)
  - Happily N'Ever After (United States and Germany)
- December 20 - Piccolo, Saxo and Company (France)
- December 22:
  - The Magic Cube (Spain)
  - Tekkonkinkreet (Japan)
- December 24 - Polar Adventures (Russia)
- Specific date unknown:
  - The Adventures of Dragon Fruit (Taiwan)
  - John Seven Seven (Portugal)
  - Kong: Return To The Jungle (United States)
  - Les naufragés de Carthage (Tunisia)
  - Saint Catherine (Italy)

== Television series debuts ==
Date	Title	Channel	Year
January 27	The Emperor's New School	Disney Channel	2006–2008
February 6	Yam Roll	CBC Television	2006
February 25	Kappa Mikey	Nicktoons Network	2006–2008
March 3	Wonder Pets	Nick Jr.	2006–2013
April 10	Pinky Dinky Doo	Noggin	2006–2011
May 5	Mickey Mouse Clubhouse	Playhouse Disney, Disney Junior	2006–2016
May 27	Squirrel Boy	Cartoon Network	2006–2007
May 29	Fetch! with Ruff Ruffman	PBS Kids Go!	2006–2010
May 30	Space Ghost Coast to Coast	GameTap	2006–2008
June 10	The Adventures of Chico and Guapo	MTV2	2006
June 10	Where My Dogs At?	MTV2	2006
July 28	The Replacements	Disney Channel	2006–2009
July 28	Shorty McShorts' Shorts	Disney Channel	2006–2007
August 6	Metalocalypse	Adult Swim	2006–2013
August 21	Wow! Wow! Wubbzy!	Nickelodeon	2006–2010
August 26	Chaotic	4Kids TV	2006–2010
August 26	Biker Mice from Mars	4Kids TV	2006–2007
August 26	Yin Yang Yo!	Jetix	2006–2009
September 2	Fantastic Four: World's Greatest Heroes	Cartoon Network	2006–2010
September 4	Curious George	PBS Kids	2006–2022
September 9	Growing Up Creepie	Discovery Kids	2006–2008
September 9	Pokémon: Battle Frontier	Cartoon Network	2006–2007
September 16	Handy Manny	Playhouse Disney	2006–2013
September 16	Horseland	CBS	2006–2008
September 25	Bigfoot Presents: Meteor and the Mighty Monster Trucks	Discovery Kids	2006–2008
September 25	Happy Tree Friends	G4	2006
September 23	Legion of Super Heroes	Kids' WB	2006–2008
September 23	Shaggy & Scooby-Doo Get a Clue!	Kids' WB	2006–2008
September 23	Tom and Jerry Tales	Kids' WB	2006–2008
October 4	Freak Show	Comedy Central	2006
October 7	Viva Piñata	4Kids TV	2006–2009
October 8	Eloise: The Animated Series	Starz	2006
October 16	Frisky Dingo	Adult Swim	2006–2008
November 3	Class of 3000	Cartoon Network	2006–2008
November 26	Assy McGee	Adult Swim	2006–2008

== Television series endings ==
Date	Title	Channel	Year	Notes
25 February	Clifford's Puppy Days	PBS Kids	2003–2006	Ended
27 February	Auto-B-Good	Syndication	2005–2006	Ended
24 April	O'Grady	The N	2004–2006	Ended
24 April	Get Ed	Jetix	2005–2006	Ended
13 May	Xiaolin Showdown	Kids' WB	2003–2006	Ended
13 May	Justice League Unlimited	Cartoon Network	2004–2006	Ended
19 May	Wonder Showzen	MTV2	2005–2006	Ended
27 May	The Buzz on Maggie	Disney Channel	2005–2006	Cancelled
27 May	Coconut Fred's Fruit Salad Island	Kids' WB	2005–2006	Cancelled
27 June	Hi Hi Puffy AmiYumi	Cartoon Network	2004–2006	Cancelled
8 July	Pokémon: Advanced Battle	Kids' WB	2005–2006	Ended
15 July	Time Warp Trio	Discovery Kids	2005–2006	Ended
21 July	What's New, Scooby-Doo?	Kids' WB	2002–2006	Ended
24 July	Minoriteam	Adult Swim	2005–2006	Cancelled
29 July	Lilo & Stitch: The Series	Disney Channel	2003–2006	Ended
29 July	The Adventures of Chico and Guapo	MTV2	2006	Cancelled
29 July	Where My Dogs At?	MTV2	2006	Cancelled
6 August	Blue's Clues	Nickelodeon	1996– 2006	Cancelled
25 August	Brandy & Mr. Whiskers	Disney Channel	2004–2006	Ended
15 September	Teen Titans	Cartoon Network	2003–2006	Cancelled
25 September	Tom Goes to the Mayor	Adult Swim	2004–2006	Ended
28 October	G.I. Joe: Sigma 6	4Kids TV	2005–2006	Cancelled
12 November	Eloise: The Animated Series	Starz	2006	Cancelled
14 November	As Told by Ginger	Nickelodeon, Nicktoons Network	2000–2006	Cancelled
16 November	Freak Show	Comedy Central	2006	Cancelled
25 November	The Adventures of Jimmy Neutron, Boy Genius	Nickelodeon	2002–2006	Cancelled
25 November	The X's	Nickelodeon	2005–2006	Cancelled
15 December	Krypto the Superdog	Cartoon Network	2005–2006	Ended
16 December	Super Robot Monkey Team Hyperforce Go!	Jetix	2004–2006	Cancelled
22 December	Happy Tree Friends	G4	2006	Ended
23 December	W.I.T.C.H.	Jetix	2004–2006	Ended
26 December	Danger Rangers	PBS Kids	2005–2006	Ended
29 December	Toopy and Binoo	Treehouse TV	2005–2006	Ended

== Television season premieres ==
Date	Title	Season	Channel
January 5	The Grim Adventures of Billy & Mandy	5	Cartoon Network
February 17	Hi Hi Puffy AmiYumi	3	Cartoon Network
March 17	Avatar: The Last Airbender	2	Nickelodeon
March 22	South Park	10	Comedy Central
April 28	Foster's Home for Imaginary Friends	4	Cartoon Network
May 29	Ben 10	2	Cartoon Network
June 8	My Gym Partner's a Monkey	2	Cartoon Network
June 10	American Dragon: Jake Long	2	Disney Channel
July 4	Camp Lazlo	3	Cartoon Network
August 2	Codename: Kids Next Door	6	Cartoon Network
August 16	The Life and Times of Juniper Lee	3	Cartoon Network
September 10	American Dad!	3	Fox
September 10	Family Guy	5	Fox
September 10	The Simpsons	18	Fox
October 5	Drawn Together	3	Comedy Central
October 6	The Grim Adventures of Billy & Mandy	6	Cartoon Network
October 9	Danny Phantom	3	Nickelodeon
October 28	Johnny Test	2	Kids' WB (The CW)
November 25	Ben 10	3	Cartoon Network

== Television season finales ==
Date	Title	Season	Channel
January 29	American Dragon: Jake Long	1	Disney Channel
March 15	Drawn Together	2	Comedy Central
March 24	Foster's Home for Imaginary Friends	3	Cartoon Network
March 25	Ben 10	1	Cartoon Network
May 14	American Dad!	2	Fox
May 14	King of the Hill	10	Fox
May 21	Family Guy	4	Fox
May 21	The Simpsons	17	Fox
May 26	My Gym Partner's a Monkey	1	Cartoon Network
June 9	Danny Phantom	2	Nickelodeon
June 10	Kim Possible	3	Disney Channel
June 20	The Life and Times of Juniper Lee	2	Cartoon Network
June 29	Camp Lazlo	2	Cartoon Network
July 29	Johnny Test	1	Kids' WB (The WB)
August 9	The Grim Adventures of Billy & Mandy	5	Cartoon Network
August 24	Codename: Kids Next Door	5	Cartoon Network
October 9	Ben 10	2	Cartoon Network
November 15	South Park	10	Comedy Central
November 23	Foster's Home for Imaginary Friends	4	Cartoon Network
November 25	The Fairly OddParents (Note: Was originally cancelled until it was revived for a 6th season in 2008.)	5	Nickelodeon
December 1	Avatar: The Last Airbender	2	Nickelodeon

== Births ==
=== March ===
- March 1: Ramone Hamilton, American actor (voice of AJ in Blaze and the Monster Machines, George Beard in The Epic Tales of Captain Underpants, Axl in The Grinch, Max in Summer Camp Island, Crash Watkins in Karma's World, Coop in The Chicken Squad, TJ in Moon Girl and Devil Dinosaur, Baxter Stockboy in the Rise of the Teenage Mutant Ninja Turtles episode "The Gumbus", Shaun in the Shimmer and Shine episode "Lightning Strikes Twice", singing voice of Crystal in Sofia the First).

=== April ===
- April 10: Dana Heath, American actress (voice of Bree in Fancy Nancy, Kira Kiwi in Princess Power).

=== May ===
- May 20: Thalia Tran, American actress (voice of Little Noi in Raya and the Last Dragon).
- May 22: Mattea Conforti, American actress (voice of young Elsa in Frozen II).

=== June ===
- June 25: Mckenna Grace, American actress (voice of Ella Bird in The Angry Birds Movie, young Daphne Blake in Scoob!, Abigail Stone in Spirit Untamed, Tinia, Ashley and Braidy Sumoski in Clarence, Cindy and Sugarbee in Pickle and Peanut, Bella in Elena of Avalor, Kambuni in The Lion Guard, Bitsy Beagleberg in Mickey and the Roadster Racers, Skye in Paw Patrol: The Mighty Movie).
- June 28: Laurel Griggs, American child actress (voice of Stella, Crab Sprout 1 and 2 and Crab Kid in Bubble Guppies), (d. 2019).
- June 29: Sam Lavagnino, American voice actor (voice of Mr. Muffin in Asdfmovie, Catbug in Bravest Warriors, Munchie in Sanjay and Craig, Eenie in The 7D, young Grizz in We Bare Bears, Blodger Blop in Miles From Tomorrowland, Rolly in seasons 1–3 of Puppy Dog Pals, Pepper and King in Summer Camp Island, Ozzy in The Grinch, Finngard in DreamWorks Dragons: Rescue Riders, Allan in Soul, Cam in Alice's Wonderland Bakery, Rings in Craig of the Creek).

=== July ===
- July 17: Lilly Bartlam, Canadian actress (voice of Gwen in Total DramaRama, Harmony in Cyberchase, continued voice of Skye in Paw Patrol).

=== September ===
- September 7: Ian Chen, American actor (voice of Jonathan in Fancy Nancy, Logan in The Rocketeer, young Din in Wish Dragon, Pale Dog in Summer Camp Island, Junn in Win or Lose).
- September 20: Amir O'Neil, American actor (voice of Marty in Madagascar: A Little Wild).

=== October ===
- October 1: Priah Ferguson, American actress (voice of Bailey in Hamster & Gretel, Lisa in My Dad the Bounty Hunter).
- October 5: Jacob Tremblay, Canadian actor (voice of Damian Wayne in Harley Quinn, the title character in Luca, Elmer Elevator in My Father's Dragon, Orion in Orion and the Dark, young Charles Lindbergh in the American Dad! episode "Fight and Flight", Nuke in the Animals episode "Roachella", Prince Lizard in the Invincible episode "Atom Eve").
- October 17: Maxwell Simkins, American actor (voice of Little Boo in The Chicken Squad).

=== December ===
- December 6: Millie Davis, Canadian actress (voice of Daisy Wheel in The Doozers, Penelope in Wishenpoof!, Mia in Little People, Esme in Esme & Roy, Dusty in Mighty Express, Harriet Tubman in the Xavier Riddle and the Secret Museum episode "I Am Harriet Tubman").
- December 9: Pixie Davies, English actress (voice of Razzi the Rat in 101 Dalmatian Street, Adel in The Magician's Elephant, Maria Renard in Castlevania: Nocturne).

== Deaths ==
=== January ===
- January 6: Lou Rawls, American actor and singer (performed in several Garfield specials, voice of Harvey in Hey Arnold!, himself in The Proud Family episode "The Party"), dies at age 72.
- January 10: Dennis Marks, American screenwriter, producer (Batfink, Hanna-Barbera, Marvel Productions, Teenage Mutant Ninja Turtles, Batman: The Animated Series, Tom and Jerry: The Movie), and voice actor (voice of Green Goblin in the Spider-Man and His Amazing Friends episode "The Triumph of the Green Goblin"), dies at age 73.
- January 17: Norman McCabe, English-American animator and illustrator (Warner Brothers Animation, DePatie-Freleng, Filmation), dies at age 94.
- January 26: Len Carlson, Canadian actor (voice of Green Goblin in Spider-Man, Professor Coldheart in Care Bears, Bert Racoon in The Raccoons, Putter in Popples, Papa Kitty in Hello Kitty's Furry Tale Theater, Buzz in Cyberchase, Pappy in Rolie Polie Olie, Minimus P.U. in Atomic Betty, Principal Mulligan in Flying Rhino Junior High, Robert Kelly in X-Men: The Animated Series, Ganon in The Legend of Zelda and Captain N: The Game Master, Loki in The Marvel Super Heroes), dies at age 68.

=== February ===
- February 3:
  - Walerian Borowczyk, Polish film director and animator (Renaissance, Jeux des Anges, Théâtre de Monsieur & Madame Kabal, Les Astronautes), dies at age 82.
  - Al Lewis, American actor (voice of Grandpa Munster in The Mini-Munsters, the Godfather in Coonskin), dies at age 82.
- February 4: Myron Waldman, American animator and comics artist (worked for Fleischer Brothers and Hal Seeger), dies at age 97.
- February 24:
  - Don Knotts, American actor (portrayed and voiced Henry Limpet in The Incredible Mr. Limpet, voice of T.W. Turtle in Cats Don't Dance, Mayor Turkey Lurkey in Chicken Little, himself in the Johnny Bravo episodes "Johnny Bravo Goes to Hollywood" and "Johnny Makeover" and The New Scooby-Doo Movies), dies at age 81.
  - Dennis Weaver, American actor and former president of the Screen Actors Guild (voice of Dusty and Josh in Captain Planet and the Planeteers, Abner Dixon in Home on the Range, Buck McCoy in The Simpsons episode "The Lastest Gun in the West"), dies from prostate cancer at age 81.

=== March ===
- March 4: David Rose, American animator (Warner Bros. Cartoons), dies at age 95.
- March 8: Rhoda Williams, American actress (voice of Drizella in Cinderella), dies at age 75.
- March 19: Brad Case, American animator (Walt Disney Animation, Walter Lantz, Warner Bros. Animation, Hanna-Barbera, DePatie-Freleng, Marvel Productions), dies at age 93.

=== May ===
- May 26: Štěpán Koníček, Czech composer and conductor (Munro, Gene Deitch, Popeye the Sailor, Tom and Jerry, Jan Svankmajer), dies at age 78.
- May 27: Alex Toth, American comics artist and animator (Space Ghost), dies from a heart attack at age 77.
- May 30: Bill Kovacs, American animator (Tron), dies at age 55.

=== June ===
- June 11: Tim Hildebrandt, American poster artist (The Secret of NIMH), and character designer (Little Orphan Annie's A Very Animated Christmas), dies at age 67.
- June 26: Jeff Winkless, American voice actor, dies at age 65.
- June 28: Lennie Weinrib, American voice actor (original voice of Scrappy-Doo, King Leonidas and the secretary bird in Bedknobs and Broomsticks, Hunk in Voltron: Defender of the Universe, Bigmouth in The Smurfs), dies at age 71.

=== July ===
- July 8: Peter Hawkins, English actor (voice of Captain Pugwash, Captain Haddock in certain Hergé's Adventures of Tintin, narrator of Noah and Nelly in... SkylArk and SuperTed, Dennis in Penny Crayon, Rochefort in John Halas's The Three Musketeers, Dennis in Penny Crayon, various characters in The Tomfoolery Show and The Perishers), dies at age 82.
- July 13: Red Buttons, American actor and comedian (portrayed Hoagy in Pete's Dragon, voice of Robespieree in Gay Purr-ee, Milton in Rudolph and Frosty's Christmas in July), dies at age 87.
- July 21: Mako, Japanese-American actor (voice of Iroh in Avatar: The Last Airbender, Aku in Samurai Jack, Mr. Yamaguchi in Rugrats in Paris: The Movie, Happy Cat and Ah-Choo in Duck Dodgers, Master Splinter in TMNT, the Ancient One in the What's New, Scooby-Doo? episode "Big Appetite in Little Tokyo", the Narrator in The Grim Adventures of Billy & Mandy episode "A Kick in the Asgard", Master Offay in the Super Robot Monkey Team Hyperforce Go! episode "Monster Battle Club Now!"), dies from respiratory arrest caused by esophageal cancer at age 72.
- July 27: Elisabeth Volkmann, German actress and comedian (dub voice of Marge Simpson and Patty and Selma in The Simpsons), dies at age 70.
- July 28: Volodymyr Dakhno, Ukrainian film director, animator and scriptwriter (Cossacks), dies at age 74.

=== August ===
- August 11: Mike Douglas, American singer, TV host and actor (singing voice of Prince Charming in Cinderella), dies at age 86.
- August 12: Magdalo Mussio, Italian animator, dies at age 81.
- August 13: Tony Jay, English actor (voice of Claude Frollo in The Hunchback of Notre Dame, Monsieur D'Arque in Beauty and the Beast, Megabyte in ReBoot, Shere Khan in TaleSpin, Jungle Cubs, The Jungle Book 2, and House of Mouse, Baron Mordo in Spider-Man, Galactus and Terrax in Fantastic Four, Chairface Chippendale in The Tick, Lord Dregg in Teenage Mutant Ninja Turtles, Bootlick in Tom and Jerry: The Movie, Dr. Lipschitz in Rugrats) dies at age 73.
- August 28: Ed Benedict, American animator, character designer and lay-out artist (Walt Disney Studios, Walter Lantz, Tex Avery, Hanna-Barbera), dies at age 94.

=== September ===
- September 4: Steve Irwin, Australian zookeeper, conservationist, television personality, wildlife expert and environmentalist (voice of Trev in Happy Feet), dies at age 44.
- September 6: Jan Svochak, Czech-American animator (Famous Studios, Pelican, Elektra, Zanders, Perpetual Motion Pictures, Buzzco, J.J. Sedelmaier Productions, the Punchy advertisements), dies at age 81.
- September 7: Bernard Wolf, American film producer (Paramount Studios, Fleischer Studios, Ub Iwerks, Walt Disney Animation Studios, MGM, Rudolph Ising, Sesame Street, Hanna-Barbera), dies at age 95.
- September 13: Ann Richards, American politician (voice of Annie in Home on the Range, Thunder Mountain Woman in the Happily Ever After: Fairy Tales for Every Child episode "Rip Van Winkle", herself in the King of the Hill episode "Hank and the Great Glass Elevator"), dies at age 73.
- September 22: Edward Albert, American actor (voice of Daredevil in Spider-Man, Rafe in Invasion America, Silver Surfer in the Fantastic Four episode "Doomsday", Sheriff White in the Extreme Ghostbusters episode "The Jersey Devil", Captain Briggs in the Godzilla: The Series episode "Vision"), dies from lung cancer at age 55.

=== October ===
- October 16:
  - Tommy Johnson, American orchestral tuba player (Walt Disney Animation Studios, All Dogs Go to Heaven, Tom and Jerry: The Movie, Toy Story, Toy Story 2, Antz, Ice Age, Looney Tunes: Back in Action, Mickey, Donald, Goofy: The Three Musketeers, The Ant Bully), dies at age 71.
  - Jack DeLeon, American actor (voice of the Human Torch in Fantastic Four, Sergeant Samuel McPherson in Halloween is Grinch Night, Dwalin, Fili, Kili, Oin, Gloin, Ori, Nori, Bifur and Bofur in The Hobbit, Kraven the Hunter in the Spider-Man episode "The Hunter and the Hunted", Nathan the fox in Stanley, the Ugly Duckling, Dark Entity in The Real Ghostbusters episode "Ragnarok and Roll", Major Courage in the DuckTales episode "Where No Duck Has Gone Before"), dies at age 81.
- October 18: Don R. Christensen, American animator, comics artist and writer, scriptwriter (Walt Disney Company, Warner Bros. Cartoons, DePatie-Freleng, Filmation, Hanna-Barbera), dies at age 90.

=== November ===
- November 11: Ronnie Stevens, English actor (narrator and additional voices in Noggin the Nog), dies at age 81.
- November 16: Eustace Lycett, British special effects artist (Walt Disney Company), dies at age 91.
- November 26: Anthony Jackson, English actor (voice of Dai Station, Evans the Song, Mr. Dinwiddy in Ivor the Engine, Nug and Mr. Blossom in The Dreamstone), dies at age 62.
- November 30: Shirley Walker, American composer and conductor (Warner Bros. Animation), dies from a stroke at age 61.

=== December ===
- December 1: Sid Raymond, American comedian and voice actor (voice of Baby Huey and Katnip), dies at age 97.
- December 8: Martha Tilton, American singer (voice of Clarice in the Chip 'n' Dale cartoon Two Chips and a Miss), dies at age 91.
- December 18: Joseph Barbera, American animator, storyboard artist, director and producer (MGM, co-founder of Hanna-Barbera), dies at age 95.
- December 24: Albert Jaminon, Belgian painter, sculptor, comic artist, animator and educator (worked for Belvision), dies at age 81.
- December 25: James Brown, American singer, dancer, musician, record producer and bandleader (voice of Hostage Negotiator in the Duckman episode "Kidney, Popsicle, and Nuts", himself in The Simpsons episode "Bart's Inner Child"), dies from heart failure at age 73.
- December 28: Prescott Wright, American film distributor and animation producer (founder of the Ottawa International Animation Festival, produced the International Tournée of Animation, creative staffing specialist of Disney's Feature Division), dies at age 71.
- December 31: Bennie Nobori, American animator and comics artist, dies at an unknown age.

== See also ==
- 2006 in anime
