= 2006 in anime =

Events in 2006 in anime.

== Events ==
In this year, 306 anime television programs were produced, and home video sales of anime DVDs and Laserdiscs in Japan were worth 95 billion yen.

== Accolades ==
At the Mainichi Film Awards, The Girl Who Leapt Through Time won the Animation Film Award and Tekkon Kinkreet won the Ōfuji Noburō Award. The inaugural Japan Academy Prize for Animation of the Year was awarded to The Girl Who Leapt Through Time; other nominees were Arashi no Yoru Ni, Tales from Earthsea, Brave Story and Detective Conan: The Private Eye's Requiem. Paprika was in competition for the Golden Lion at the 63rd Venice International Film Festival.

== Releases ==
=== Films ===
A list of anime that debuted in theaters between January 1 and December 31, 2006.

| Release date | Title | Studio | Director | Running time (minutes) | Japanese title | Ref |
|---|---|---|---|---|---|---|
| January 7 | Origin: Spirits of the Past | Gonzo | Keiichi Sugiyama | 95 | Gin'iro no kami no agito | |
| March 4 | Mobile Suit Zeta Gundam: A New Translation III – Love Is the Pulse of the Stars | Sunrise | Yoshiyuki Tomino | 100 | Kidō senshi zettogandamu III - hoshi no kodō wa ai - | |
| March 4 | One Piece: The Giant Mechanical Soldier of Karakuri Castle | Toei Animation | Kōnosuke Uda | 94 | Wan pīsu the mūbī: karakuri-jō no meka kyohei | |
| March 11 | Kaiketsu Zorori | Ajia-do; Sunrise | Hajime Kamegaki | 53 | Majime ni fumaji me ka iketsu zorori nazo no otakara dai sakusen | |
| March 11 | Fist of the North Star: Raoh Side Story Junai Arc | TMS Entertainment | Takahiro Imamura | 95 | Ma kyūseishu densetsu hokuto no kobushi Raō Den Jun ai no shō | |
| March 11 | Sergeant Frog Movie | Sunrise | Junichi Satō (Chief); Nobuhiro Kondō | 59 | Chō gekijō-ban keroro gunsō | |
| April 8 | Tachigui – The Amazing Lives of the Fast Food Grifters | Production I.G | Mamoru Oshii | 104 | Tachiguishi retsuden | |
| April 8 | Yonna in the Solitary Fortress | CoMix Wave Films | Kengo Takeuchi | 33 | Hanare toride no Yona | |
| April 15 | Crayon Shin-chan: The Legend Called: Dance! Amigo! | Shin-Ei Animation | Yūji Mutō | 90 | Eiga Kureyon shin-chan densetsu o yobu odore! Amīgo! | |
| April 15 | Detective Conan: The Private Eyes' Requiem | TMS Entertainment | Yasuichiro Yamamoto | 111 | Meitantei konan: tantei-tachi no rekuiemu | |
| June 17 | The Celestial Railroad | KAGAYA Studio | Kagaya | 48 | Ginga tetsudō no yoru – Fantasy Railroad in the Stars - | |
| June 28 | Aachi and Ssipak | Studio 2.0 | Jo Beom-jin | 87 | Āchi to shīpakku | |
| July 8 | Brave Story | Gonzo | Koichi Chigira | 112 | Bureibu sutōrī | |
| July 15 | The Girl Who Leapt Through Time | Madhouse | Mamoru Hosoda | 98 | Toki wo kakeru shōjo | |
| July 29 | Tales from Earthsea | Studio Ghibli | Gorō Miyazaki | 115 | Gedo senki | |
| August 5 | Naruto the Movie: Guardians of the Crescent Moon Kingdom | Studio Pierrot | Toshiyuki Tsuru | 94 | Gekijō-ban naruto - naruto - dai kōfun! Mika dzuki shima no animaru sōdō datteba yo | |
| November 25 | Paprika | Madhouse | Satoshi Kon | 90 | Papurika | |
| December 9 | Digimon Savers: Ultimate Power! Activate Burst Mode!! | Toei Animation | Tatsuya Nagamine | 20 | Dejimon seibāzu the mūbī: kyūkyoku pawā! Bāsutomōdo hatsudō!! | |
| December 9 | Pretty Cure Splash Star Tic-Tac Crisis Hanging by a Thin Thread! | Toei Animation | Junji Shimizu | 50 | Eiga futari hapuri kyua supurashu Star: chikutaku kiki ippatsu! | |
| December 16 | Bleach: Memories of Nobody | Studio Pierrot | Noriyuki Abe | 93 | Gekijō-ban burīchi: memorī of nōbadi | |
| December 23 | Tekkonkinkreet | Studio 4°C | Michael Arias | 111 | Tetsu kon-kin kurīto | |

=== Television series ===
A list of anime television series that debuted between January 1 and December 31, 2006.

| First run start and end dates | Title | Episodes | Studio | Director | Alternate title | Ref |
|---|---|---|---|---|---|---|
| January 1 – April 1 | Magikano | 13 | Tokyo Kids | Seiji Kishi | Majikano | |
| January 4 – March 22 | Ah My Buddha (season 2) | 12 | Studio Deen | Keitaro Motonaga | Amaenaide yotsu!! Katsu!! | |
| January 4 – March 29 | Eternal Alice | 13 | Trinet Entertainment; Picture Magic | Nagisa Miyazaki | Kagi hime monogatari towa Arisu rondo | |
| January 4 – July 10 | Humanoid Monster Bem | 26 | Studio Comet | Hiroshi Harada | Yōkai ningen bemu | |
| January 5 – March 23 | Rakugo Tennyo Oyui | 12 | TNK | Yoshihiro Takamoto | Rakugo ten'nyo oyui | |
| January 5 – March 30 | Kinnikuman II Sei: Ultimate Muscle 2 | 13 | Toei Animation | Toshiaki Komura | Kin'nikuman II yo ultimate massuru 2 | |
| January 6 – March 31 | Lemon Angel Project | 13 | Radix | Daisuke Chiba | Remon Enjeru purojekuto | |
| January 7 – June 17 | Fate/stay night | 24 | Studio Deen | Yūji Yamaguchi | Fate/stay night | |
| January 7 – December 30 | Wan Wan Celeb Soreyuke! Tetsunoshin | 51 | Studio Comet | Kiyoshi Fukumoto | Wan wan serepū sore yuke! Tetsunoshin | |
| January 8 – March 26 | Guardian Ninja Mamoru | 12 | Group TAC | Yoshitaka Fujimoto | Kage kara mamoru | |
| January 8 – April 2 | Tactical Roar | 13 | Actas | Yoshitaka Fujimoto | Takutikaru roa | |
| January 9 – March 26 | Yomigaeru Sora – Rescue Wings | 13 | J.C.Staff | Katsushi Sakurabi | Yomigaeru sora – Rescue uingusu - | |
| January 9 – December 25 | Crash B-Daman | 50 | Nippon Animedia | Yoshiaki Okumura | Bakudama hitto! Kurasshu bīdaman | |
| January 10 – March 28 | Play Ball 2nd | 13 | Eiken | Satoshi Dezaki | Purei bōru 2nd | |
| January 10 – March 28 | Nerima Daikon Brothers | 12 | Studio Hibari | Shinichi Watanabe | Nerima daikon burazāzu | |
| January 12 – March 30 | Kashimashi: Girl Meets Girl | 12 | Studio Hibari | Nobuaki Nakanishi | Kashimashi 〜 gāru mītsu gāru 〜 | |
| January 13 – February 24 | Hanbun no Tsuki ga Noboru Sora | 6 | Group TAC | Yukihiro Matsushita | Hanbun' no tsuki ga noboru sora | |
| January 13 – March 24 | Ayakashi: Samurai Horror Tales | 11 | Toei Animation | Tetsuo Imazawa (Yotsuya Kaidan); Hidehiko Kadota (Tenshu Monogatari); Kouzou Nagayama (Tenshu Monogatari); Kenji Nakamura (Bakeneko) | Kai ~ ayakashi ~ japanīzu kurashikku Horror | |
| January 22 – April 13 | Meine Liebe: Wieder | 13 | Bee Train | Shinya Kawatsura | Gin'yū mokushiroku maine rībe vuīdā | |
| February 3 – March 31 | Rec | 9 | Shaft | Ryūtarō Nakamura | Rekku | |
| February 3 – April 16 | Binchō-tan | 12 | Studio Deen | Kazuhiro Furuhashi | Bin chō Tan | |
| February 5 – January 28, 2007 | Futari wa Pretty Cure Splash Star | 49 | Toei Animation | Toshiaki Komura | Futari hapuri kyua supurashu ☆ Star | |
| February 9 – March 17 | Papillon Rose: The New Season | 6 | Studio Kelmadick | Yasuhiro Matsumura | Papiyon rōze | |
| February 25 – August 12 | Ergo Proxy | 23 | Manglobe | Shūkō Murase | Erugo purakushī | |
| March 3 – April 7 | Ballad of a Shinigami | 6 | Ginga Ya; Group TAC | Tomomi Mochizuki | Shinigami no baraddo. | |
| April 1 – June 24 | Gakuen Heaven | 13 | Tokyo Kids | Yukina Hiiro | Gakuen hevun | |
| April 1 – December 21 | Hula Kappa | 78 | Office AO | | Fura kappā | |
| April 1 – March 31, 2007 | Twin Princesses of Wonder Planet Gyu! | 52 | HAL Film Maker; J.C.Staff | Junichi Sato (chief); Shōgo Kōmoto | Fushigiboshi no Futagohime Gyu! | |
| April 2 – June 25 | Gargoyle of Yoshinaga House | 13 | Studio Hibari | Iku Suzuki | Yoshinaga-san-ka no gāgoiru | |
| April 2 – June 25 | Soul Link | 12 | Picture Magic | Toshikatsu Tokoro | Soul Link | |
| April 2 – September 24 | Akubi Girl | 26 | Tatsunoko Production | | Akubi gāru | |
| April 2 – October 1 | Fighting Beauty Wulong Rebirth | 25 | TMS Entertainment | Yoshio Suzuki | Kakutō bishin bu ūron REBIRTH | |
| April 2 – March 25, 2007 | Digimon Data Squad | 48 | Toei Animation | Naoyuki Itō | Dejimon seibāzu | |
| April 2 – March 25, 2007 | Kiba | 51 | Madhouse | Hiroshi Kōjina | Kiba | |
| April 2 – March 25, 2007 | Onegai My Melody: Kuru Kuru Shuffle | 52 | Studio Comet | Makoto Moriwaki | Onegai mai merodi kurukuru shaffuru! | |
| April 3 – July 3 | The Melancholy of Haruhi Suzumiya | 14 | Kyoto Animation | Tatsuya Ishihara | Suzumiya haruhi no yūutsu | |
| April 3 – September 25 | Aria the Natural | 26 | HAL Film Maker | Junichi Sato | ARIA The NATURAL | |
| April 3 – September 25 | School Rumble: 2nd Semester | 26 | Studio Comet | Takaomi Kanasaki | Sukūru ranburu ni gakki | |
| April 3 – March 26, 2007 | BakéGyamon | 51 | Radix | Hiroshi Negishi | Doa ni mukau akuma | |
| April 4 – June 20 | High School Girls | 12 | Arms; Studio Guts; Studio Kelmadick | Yoshitaka Fujimoto | Mesu kōsei gāru's high | |
| April 4 – June 20 | Renkin 3-kyū Magical? Pokān | 12 | Remic | Kenichi Yatagai | Renkin 3-kyūmaji karu? Pokan | |
| April 4 – September 26 | Simoun | 26 | Studio Deen | Junji Nishimura | Shimūn | |
| April 4 – September 26 | Strawberry Panic! | 26 | Madhouse | Masayuki Sakoi | Sutoroberī panikku | |
| April 4 – September 26 | Utawarerumono | 26 | OLM | Tomoki Kobayashi | Utawarerumono | |
| April 4 – March 25, 2010 | Gin Tama | 201 | Sunrise | Shinji Takamatsu (eps 1-105); Yoichi Fujita (eps 100-201) | Gintama | |
| April 5 – June 21 | Makai Senki Disgaea | 12 | OLM | Kiyotaka Isako | Makai senki disugaia | |
| April 5 – June 28 | Ray the Animation | 13 | OLM | Naohito Takahashi | RAY THE ANIMATION | |
| April 5 – September 22 | Glass Fleet | 26 | Gonzo; Satelight | Minoru Ōhara | Garasu no kantai ~ La legende du vent de l' univers ~ | |
| April 5 – September 27 | Air Gear | 25 | Marvelous Entertainment; Toei Animation | Hajime Kamegaki | Ea gia | |
| April 5 – September 27 | Higurashi When They Cry | 26 | Studio Deen | Chiaki Kon | Higurashi no naku koroni | |
| April 5 – September 27 | Love Get Chu | 25 | Radix | Mitsuhiro Tōgō | Rabu ge~tsu CHU ~ mirakuru seiyū hakusho ~ | |
| April 5 – September 27 | Ouran High School Host Club | 26 | Bones | Takuya Igarashi | Ōran kōkō hosu tobu | |
| April 5 – September 27 | Spider Riders | 26 | Bee Train | Kōichi Mashimo; Takaaki Ishiyama | Supaidā raidāzu ~ orakuru no yūsha-tachi ~ | |
| April 5 – March 28, 2007 | Nana | 47 | Madhouse | Morio Asaka | Nana | |
| April 5 – March 28, 2008 | Trotting Hamtaro Hai! | 77 | TMS Entertainment | Osamu Nabeshima | Tottoko hamutarō wai! | |
| April 6 – June 12 | Ring ni Kakero 1 Episode: The Pacific War | 12 | Toei Animation | Yukio Kaizawa | Ringu ni kakero 1: Nichibei kessen-hen | |
| April 6 – June 15 | Eagle Talon | 11 | DLE | Ryo Ono | Himitsu kessha taka no tsume | |
| April 6 – June 22 | Princess Princess | 12 | Studio Deen | Keitaro Motonaga | Purinsesu purinsesu | |
| April 6 – September 14 | Yoshimune | 24 | AIC Spirits; Ginga Ya; Gonzino | Hiroaki Sato | Yoshimune | |
| April 6 – September 21 | Witchblade | 24 | Gonzo | Yoshimitsu Ohashi | Uitchibureido | |
| April 6 – September 28 | .hack//Roots | 26 | Bee Train | Kōichi Mashimo | .hack//Roots | |
| April 6 – September 28 | Inukami! | 26 | Seven Arcs | Keizō Kusakawa | Inu ka mi~tsu! | |
| April 6 – September 28 | Iron Kid | 26 | Daewon Media | | Aian kiddo | |
| April 6 – September 28 | Zegapain | 26 | Sunrise | Masami Shimoda | Zēgapein | |
| April 7 – September 15 | Ah! My Goddess: Flights of Fancy | 22 | AIC | Hiroaki Gōda | Ām megami sama: sorezore no tsubasa | |
| April 7 – September 29 | xxxHolic | 24 | Production I.G | Tsutomu Mizushima | ×××horikku | |
| April 7 – March 27, 2009 | Kirarin Revolution | 153 | G&G Entertainment; SynergySP | Masaharu Okuwaki | Kirarin ☆ reboryūshon | |
| April 8 – July 1 | The Good Witch Of The West | 13 | HAL Film Maker | Katsuichi Nakayama | Nishi no yoki majo: Astraea Testament | |
| April 8 – September 30 | Rockman.EXE Beast+ | 26 | Xebec | Takao Kato | Rokkuman'eguze bīsuto purasu | |
| April 8 – February 24, 2007 | The Story of Saiunkoku | 39 | Madhouse | Jun Shishido | Saiunkoku monogatari | |
| April 9 – June 25 | Black Lagoon | 12 | Madhouse | Sunao Katabuchi | BLACK LAGOON | |
| April 9 – June 25 | Yume Tsukai | 12 | Madhouse | Kazuo Yamazaki | Yume tsukai | |
| April 9 – July 2 | Himawari! | 13 | Arms | Shigenori Kageyama | Himawari~tsu! | |
| April 9 – October 8 | Musashi Gundoh | 26 | ACC Production | Yuki Kinoshita | Gan michi musashi | |
| April 10 – September 4 | Black Jack 21 | 17 | Tezuka Productions | Satoshi Kuwabara (chief); Makoto Tezuka | Burakku jakku 21 | |
| April 10 – March 23, 2007 | Shinseiki Duel Masters Flash | 24 | SynergySP | Suzuki Warurou | Shin hoshi ki deyueru masutāzu furasshu | |
| April 13 – July 13 | Sasami: Magical Girls Club | 13 | AIC Spirits | Yoshihiro Takamoto | Sasami - mahō shōjo kurabu - | |
| April 13 – July 20 | Hime-sama Goyōjin | 12 | Nomad | Shigehito Takayanagi | Hime-sama goyōjin | |
| April 14 – June 23 | Jyu-Oh-Sei | 11 | Bones | Hiroshi Nishikiori | Jū ōsei | |
| April 14 – October 27 | The Third: Aoi Hitomi no Shōjo | 24 | Xebec | Jun Kamiya | Za sādo: aoi hitomi no shōjo | |
| April 16 – July 30 | Tokko | 13 | AIC Spirits; Group TAC | Masashi Abe | Tokkō | |
| April 29 – November 4 | Tsubasa Chronicle (season 2) | 26 | Bee Train | Kōichi Mashimo; Hiroshi Morioka | Tsubasa kuronikuru dai 2 shirīzu | |
| May 18 – August 10 | Kamisama Kazoku | 13 | Toei Animation | Kimitoshi Chioka | Kamisama kazoku | |
| May 19 – August 18 | Kishin Hōkō Demonbane | 12 | View Works | Hidetoshi Yoshida | Kishin hōkō demonbein | |
| May 20 – August 26 | IGPX: Immortal Grand Prix (Season 2) | 13 | Production I.G | Mitsuru Hongo | IGPX -Immortal Grand Prix- | |
| June 17 – December 31 | Night Head Genesis | 24 | Bee Media | Yoshio Takeuchi | Naito heddo jeneshisu | |
| June 30 – September 15 | Binbō Shimai Monogatari | 10 | Toei Animation | Yukio Kaizawa | Binbō shimai monogatari | |
| June 30 – September 15 | Honey and Clover II | 12 | J.C.Staff | Tatsuyuki Nagai | Hachimitsu to kurōbā II | |
| July 1 – March 31, 2007 | Otogi-Jūshi Akazukin | 39 | Madhouse | Takaaki Ishiyama | O togi jūshi akazukin | |
| July 1 – June 30, 2007 | Powerpuff Girls Z | 52 | Toei Animation | Megumu Ishiguro | Demashita~tsu! Pawapafu gāruzu Z | |
| July 2 – September 17 | Tsuyokiss Cool×Sweet | 12 | Studio Hibari; Trinet Entertainment | Shinichiro Kimura | Tsuyoki su | |
| July 2 – September 24 | Mamotte! Lollipop | 13 | Studio Comet | Noriyoshi Nakamura | Mamotte! Roripoppu | |
| July 2 – December 3 | Project Blue Earth SOS | 6 | A.C.G.T. | Tensai Okamura | Project BLUE chikyū esuōesu | |
| July 2 – February 24, 2007 | Le Chevalier D'Eon | 24 | Production I.G | Kazuhiro Furuhashi | Shuvu~arie Le Chevalier D' Eon | |
| July 3 – September 25 | The Familiar of Zero | 13 | J.C.Staff | Yoshiaki Iwasaki | Zero no tsukaima | |
| July 4 – September 19 | Coyote Ragtime Show | 12 | ufotable | Matsuri Ouse (chief); Takuya Nonaka | Koyōte ragutaimu shō | |
| July 4 – December 26 | We Were There | 26 | Artland | Kōichirō Sohtome (chief); Akitaro Daichi | Bokura ga ita | |
| July 5 – September 20 | Muteki Kanban Musume | 12 | Telecom Animation Film | Nobuo Tomizawa | Muteki kanban musume | |
| July 6 – September 21 | Government Crime Investigation Agent Zaizen Jotaro | 11 | Trans Arts | Hidetoshi Ōmori | Naikaku kenryoku hanzai kyōsei torishimari-kan zaizen jōtarō | |
| July 8 – September 30 | Koi suru Tenshi Angelique | 13 | Satelight | Susumu Kudo | Koisuru tenshi anjerīku ~ kokoro no mezameru toki ~ | |
| July 9 – October 1 | Tona-Gura! | 13 | Daume | Tatsuya Abe | Tonagura! | |
| July 10 – December 18 | Welcome to the N.H.K. | 24 | Gonzo | Yusuke Yamamoto | NHK ni yōkoso! | |
| July 12 – December 20 | Chocotto Sister | 24 | Nomad | Yasuhiro Kuroda | Chokotto shisutā | |
| July 27 – October 26 | Innocent Venus | 12 | Brain's Base | Jun Kawagoe | Inosento vu~īnasu | |
| August 5 – October 21 | Masuda Kousuke Gekijou Gag Manga Biyori 2 | 12 | Artland | Akitarō Daichi | Masuda kōsuke gekijō gyagumangabiyori 2 | |
| August 6 – November 5 | Kemonozume | 13 | Madhouse | Masaaki Yuasa | Kemonodzume | |
| August 8 – October 31 | Hanoka | 12 | RAMS | Aruji Morino | HANOKA ~ hanoka ~ | |
| September 8 – November 24 | Black Blood Brothers | 12 | Group TAC; Studio Live | Hiroaki Yoshikawa | Burakku Buraddo burazāzu | |
| September 16 – March 24, 2007 | Silk Road Shounen Yuuto | 26 | OLM | Tetsuro Amino | Shiruku rōdo shōnen yūto | |
| September 18 – May 14, 2007 | Pucca | 26 | Studio B Productions (2006–08); Bazooka Studio (2018–19) | Greg Sullivan; Jayson Thiessen (co-director, season 2); Joon Won Lee (season 3) | Oppai shōjo puka | |
| September 23 – March 25, 2007 | Oban Star-Racers | 26 | HAL Film Maker | Savin Yeatman-Eiffel; Thomas Romain | Ōban sutār-ēsāzu | |
| October 2 – December 25 | Galaxy Angel Rune | 13 | Satelight | Seiji Kishi | Gyarakushī enjeru ~ n | |
| October 2 – December 25 | Marginal Prince | 13 | Tokyo Kids | Takayuki Inagaki | Mājinaru purinsu - gekkeiju no ōjitachi - | |
| October 2 – March 26, 2007 | La Corda d'Oro: Primo Passo | 25 | Yumeta Company | Kōjin Ochi | Kin'iro no koruda ~ primo passo ~ | |
| October 3 – December 19 | Black Lagoon: The Second Barrage | 12 | Madhouse | Sunao Katabuchi | BLACK LAGOON: The Second Barrage | |
| October 3 – December 19 | Lovely Idol | 12 | AIC ASTA; TNK | Keitaro Motonaga | Rabudoru ~ raburī Idol ~ | |
| October 3 – March 18, 2007 | Pumpkin Scissors | 24 | AIC; Gonzo | Katsuhito Akiyama | Panpukin shizāzu | |
| October 3 – April 3, 2007 | Tokimeki Memorial Only Love | 25 | AIC ASTA | Yoshihiro Takamoto | Tokimeki memoriaru onrī rabu | |
| October 3 – September 30, 2008 | D.Gray-man | 103 | TMS Entertainment | Nana Harada (chief) (89 episodes); Osamu Nabeshima | Dī gureiman | |
| October 4 – March 14, 2007 | Red Garden | 22 | Gonzo | Kou Matsuo | Reddo gāden | |
| October 4 – March 28, 2007 | Ghost Hunt | 25 | J.C.Staff | Akira Mano | Gōsuto hanto | |
| October 4 – March 28, 2007 | Negima!? | 26 | GANSIS; Shaft | Shin Ōnuma (chief); Akiyuki Shinbo | Negima!? | |
| October 4 – March 28, 2007 | Shōnen Onmyōji | 26 | Studio Deen | Kunihiro Mori | Wakaki onmyōji | |
| October 4 – March 28, 2007 | The Wallflower | 25 | Nippon Animation | Shinichi Watanabe | Yamato nadeshiko shichihenge | |
| October 4 – June 27, 2007 | Death Note | 37 | Madhouse | Tetsurō Araki | Desu nōto | |
| October 5 – December 21 | Yoake Mae yori Ruriiro na | 12 | Daume | Masahiko Ohta | Yoake mae yori ruriiro na - kuresento rabu - | |
| October 5 – January 11, 2007 | Sasami Magical Girls Club 2 | 13 | AIC Spirits | Yoshihiro Takamoto | Sasami ☆ mahō shōjo kurabu shīzun 2 | |
| October 5 – March 15, 2007 | Fist of the Blue Sky | 22 | APPP | Mihiro Yamaguchi | Sōten' no kobushi | |
| October 5 – March 29, 2007 | Buso Renkin | 26 | Xebec | Takao Kato | Musō renkin | |
| October 5 – March 29, 2007 | The Galaxy Railways: Crossroads to Eternity | 24 | Planet | Tsuneo Tominaga | Ginga tetsudō monogatari ~ eien e no bunkiten ~ | |
| October 5 – March 29, 2007 | Super Robot Wars Original Generation: Divine Wars | 25 | OLM | Hiroyuki Kakudō | Sūpā robotto taisen OG - dibain uōzu - | |
| October 5 – October 11, 2007 | Artificial Insect KABUTO BORG Victory by Victory | 52 | G&G Entertainment | Hiroshi Ishiodori | Jinzō konchū kabutobōgu V×V | |
| October 6 – December 22 | 009-1 | 12 | Ishimori Entertainment | Naoyuki Konno | Zero zero nain wan | |
| October 6 – December 22 | Gift: Eternal Rainbow | 12 | OLM | Shigeru Kimiya | Gifuto ~ eternal rainbow | |
| October 6 – December 22 | Gin'iro no Olynssis | 12 | Toei Animation | Katsumi Tokoro | Gin'iro no orinshisu TOKITO | |
| October 6 – December 22 | Happiness! | 12 | Artland | Hiroshi Hara | Wa pinesu! | |
| October 6 – December 22 | Living for the Day After Tomorrow | 12 | J.C.Staff | Katsushi Sakurabi | Asatte no hōkō. | |
| October 6 – March 16, 2007 | Kanon | 24 | Kyoto Animation | Tatsuya Ishihara | Kanon (2006) | |
| October 6 – March 16, 2007 | Sumomomo Momomo | 22 | Studio Hibari | Nobuaki Nakanishi | Sumomo mo momo mo 〜 chijō saikyō no yome 〜 | |
| October 6 – March 30, 2007 | Mamoru-kun ni Megami no Shukufuku o! | 24 | Zexcs | Itsuro Kawasaki | Mamoru-kun' ni megami no shukufuku wo | |
| October 6 – July 29, 2007 | Code Geass: Lelouch of the Rebellion | 25 | Sunrise | Gorō Taniguchi | Kōdo giasu: hangyaku no rurūshu | |
| October 7 – December 23 | Kujibiki Unbalance | 12 | Ajia-do | Tsutomu Mizushima | Kuji-biki ♥ anbaransu | |
| October 7 – March 31, 2007 | Ghost Slayers Ayashi | 25 | Bones | Hiroshi Nishikiori | Tienbao ueiuen yaokishi | |
| October 7 – April 7, 2007 | Hell Girl: Two Mirrors | 26 | Studio Deen | Takahiro Omori | Djigoku shōjo futagomori | |
| October 7 – September 29, 2007 | Pururun! Shizuku-chan | 51 | TMS Entertainment | Atsushi Yano | Pururun~tsu! Shizuku-chan | |
| October 7 – October 27, 2007 | Mega Man Star Force | 55 | Xebec | Takao Kato | Ryūsei no rokkuman | |
| October 7 – September 25, 2010 | Reborn! | 203 | Artland | Kenichi Imaizumi | Kateikyōshi Hittoman ribon! | |
| October 8 – December 24 | Otome wa Boku ni Koishiteru | 12 | feel. | Munenori Nawa | Otome wa boku ni koishiteru | |
| October 8 – September 30, 2007 | Kenichi: The Mightiest Disciple | 50 | TMS Entertainment | Hajime Kamegaki | Shijō saikyō no deshi Ken'ichi | |
| October 13 – December 22 | Hataraki Man | 11 | Gallop | Katsumi Ono | Hataraki man | |
| October 15 – December 31 | Bartender | 11 | Palm Studio | Masaki Watanabe | Bātendā | |
| October 15 – September 30, 2007 | Happy Lucky Bikkuriman | 46 | Toei Animation | Gō Koga | Iwai! (Hapi ☆ raki) Bikkuriman | |
| October 16 – February 5, 2008 | Kekkaishi | 52 | Sunrise | Kenji Kodama | Ketsukaishi | |
| November 2 – February 15, 2007 | Strain: Strategic Armored Infantry | 13 | Studio Fantasia | Tetsuya Watanabe | Sōkō no sutorein | |
| November 12 – February 18, 2007 | Tokyo Tribes | 13 | Madhouse | Tatsuo Satō | TOKYO TRIBE 2 | |

=== Original net animations ===
A list of original net animations that debuted between January 1 and December 31, 2006.

| First run start and end dates | Title | Episodes | Studio | Director | Alternate title | Ref |
|---|---|---|---|---|---|---|
| June 16 – March 2, 2007 | Flag | 13 | The Answer Studio | Ryousuke Takahashi (chief); Kazuo Terada | Furaggu | |
| July 10 | Hoshizora Kiseki | 1 | CoMix Wave Films | Akio Watanabe; Toshikazu Matsubara | Hoshizora kiseki | |
| July 14 – September 29 | Mobile Suit Gundam SEED C.E. 73: Stargazer | 3 | Sunrise | Susumu Nishizawa | Kidō Senshi Gundam SEED C.E. 73: Stargazer | |
| September 29 – February 23, 2007 | Kimi ga Nozomu Eien: Ayu Mayu Gekijou | 7 | Picture Magic | Satoshi Saga | Ayu mayu gekijō | |

=== Original video animations ===
A list of original video animations that debuted between January 1 and December 31, 2006.

| First run start and end dates | Title | Episodes | Studio | Director | Alternate title | Ref |
|---|---|---|---|---|---|---|
| January 12 – July 20 | Gunparade Orchestra OVA | 3 | Brain's Base | | Ganparēdo ōkesutora | |
| January 18 | Beyond the Train Tracks | 1 | Directions, Inc. | Tayuta Mikage | Tetsuro no kanata | |
| January 22 | Hellsing: Digest for Freaks | 1 | Satelight | Hideki Tonokatsu | HELLSING I OVA DIGEST FOR FREAKS | |
| January 27 | Ghost in the Shell: Stand Alone Complex 2nd GIG – Individual Eleven | 1 | Production I.G | Kenji Kamiyama | Kōkaku kidōtai S. A. C. 2 Nd gigu kojin irebun | |
| February 10 – December 26, 2012 | Hellsing Ultimate | 10 | Graphinica; Madhouse; Satelight | Hiroyuki Tanaka (eps 5-7); Kenichi Suzuki (eps 9-10); Tomokazu Tokoro (eps 1-4); Yasuhiro Matsumura (eps 8, 10) | HELLSING OVA | |
| February 22 | Jinki: Extend | 1 | feel. | | Jinki ekusutendo dai 13-wa 'sore kara' | |
| March 15 | Detective Conan: Follow the Vanished Diamond! Conan & Heiji vs. Kid! | 1 | TMS Entertainment | Masato Sato | Meitantei konan: kieta daiya o oe! Konan, Heiji vs kiddo! | |
| March 20 | Magical Witch Punie-Chan | 4 | Diomedéa | Tsutomu Mizushima | Dai mahō-tōge | |
| March 22 | Ar Tonelico: The Girl Who Sings at the End of the World | 1 | Trans Arts | Ken Ando | Aru toneriko sekai no owari de utai tsudzukeru shōjo | |
| March 23 – May 31 | Cream Lemon: New Generation | 4 | Radix | Naruyo Takahashi | Kuryimu remon nyū jenerēshon | |
| March 24 | Sin in the Rain | 1 | Mook Animation | Hitoshi Haga | sin in the rain | |
| March 24 | TANK S.W.A.T. 01 | 1 | DOGA Productions | Romanov Higa | Keisatsu sensha-tai | |
| March 24 – March 21, 2007 | Today in Class 5-2 | 4 | Lilix; Shinkuukan | Makoto Sokuza | Kyō no go no ni | |
| March 24 – March 23, 2007 | The Prince of Tennis: National Championship Chapter | 13 | M.S.C | Shunsuke Tada | Tenisu no ōjisama Original vuideo Animation zenkoku taikai-hen | |
| March 29 | Memories Off #5 Togireta Film The Animation | 1 | Doga Kobo | Tarou Iwasaki | Memorīzu ofu# 5 togireta firumu the animēshon | |
| March 29 | Fullmetal Alchemist: Premium Collection | 3 | Bones | Seiji Mizushima | Hagane no renkinjutsushi puremiamu korekushon | |
| March 31 | Haru no Ashioto The Movie: Ourin Dakkan | 1 | Asahi Production | | Harunoashioto The movuie – ōrin dakkan | |
| April 26 – August 25 | Mobile Suit Gundam MS IGLOO: Apocalypse 0079 | 3 | Sunrise | Takashi Imanishi | Kidō senshi Gandamu MS igurū - mokushiroku 0079 - | |
| April 28 – May 26 | Angel's Feather | 2 | Venet | Yasuhiro Kuroda | Enjeru zufeza | |
| April 28 – July 28 | Honey x Honey Drops | 2 | Radix | Mitsuhiro Tougou | Mitsu × mitsu doroppusu | |
| July 21 – October 25 | UFO Ultramaiden Valkyrie 4: Banquet of Time, Dreams, and Galaxies | 2 | TNK | Yoshihiro Takamoto | Enban kōjo waruki ~yu ̄re-ji to yume to ginga no utage | |
| July 26 | Pinky Street | 2 | Gonzo | Keiichiro Kawaguchi | Pinkī sutorīto | |
| July 26 | Onimusha: Dawn of Dreams | 1 | | Kouichi Kimura | Nyū onitake-sha DAWN OF DREAMS THE sutōrī | |
| August 1 | Fantascope: Tylostoma | 1 | Toei Animation | | Fantascope~tylostoma~ | |
| August 1 | Gendai Kibunroku Kaii Monogatari | 1 | Toei Animation | | Gendai 畸聞-Roku kaii monogatari | |
| August 1 | Joseito | 1 | Toei Animation | Shutaro Oku | On'na seito | |
| August 1 | Maihime | 1 | Toei Animation | Shutaro Oku | Maihime | |
| August 1 | Neko Machi | 1 | Toei Animation | | Neko machi | |
| August 1 | Tsuyu no Hito Shizuku | 1 | Toei Animation | | Tsuyu no hito shizuku ~'ueda shōji' no shashin sekai o samayō ~ | |
| August 1 | You Shoumei Bijutsukan Line | 1 | Toei Animation | | Yōshōmei bijutsukan LINE | |
| August 1 | Zakuro Yashiki | 1 | Toei Animation | | Zakuro yashiki | |
| August 24 – March 23, 2007 | Kikoushi Enma | 4 | Brain's Base | Mamoru Kanbe | Gōsuto masutā baru rogu | |
| August 25 | Sky Girls OVA | 1 | J.C.Staff | Yoshiaki Iwasaki | Sukai gāruzu | |
| August 25 | Fushigiboshi no☆Futagohime Gyu! Recap | 1 | J.C.Staff | Shōgo Kōmoto | Fushigiboshi no futagohime Gyu! Supesharu gururi ☆ fushigi hoshi meguri | |
| September 22 – October 22 | Stratos 4 Advance Kanketsu-hen | 2 | Studio Fantasia | Takeshi Mori | Sutoratosu fō adovuansu kanketsu-hen | |
| September 27 | G-9 | 1 | Toei Animation | Keita Amemiya | G-jiǔ | |
| September 27 | Kaleido Star: Good da yo! Goood!! | 1 | Gonzo | Junichi Satō; Yoshimasa Hiraike | Guddoda yo! Guuddo!! | |
| October 25 | Negima!? Haru Special!? | 1 | GANSIS; Shaft | Akiyuki Simbo (chief); Shin Ōnuma | Negima!? Haru supesharu!? | |
| October 27 | Girl Meets Girl | 1 | Studio Hibari | | Kashimashi ~ gāru mītsu gāru ~ shōjo wa shōjo ni koi o shita | |
| October 27 – January 26, 2007 | Underbar Summer | 2 | Rikuentai | Takahiro Okao | Andābā samā | |
| November 10 – April 4, 2007 | Baldr Force EXE Resolution | 4 | Trinet Entertainment; Satelight | Takashi Yamazaki | Barudofōsu eguze resoryūshon | |
| November 22 | Negima!? Natsu Special!? | 1 | GANSIS; Shaft | Akiyuki Simbo (chief); Shin Ōnuma | Negima!? Natsu supesharu!? | |
| November 24 – August 24, 2007 | My-Otome Zwei | 4 | Sunrise | Masakazu Obara | Dance - B HiME ZWEI | |
| November 24 – May 23, 2008 | Freedom | 7 | Sunrise | Shuhei Morita | FREEDOM | |
| December 8 | Shakugan no Shana: Koi to Onsen no Kougai Gakushuu! | 1 | J.C.Staff | Takashi Watanabe | Shakugan'no shana SP koi to onsen no kōgai gakushū! | |
| December 22 – April 25, 2007 | Genshiken | 3 | Ajia-do | Tsutomu Mizushima | Genshiken ovu~a | |
| December 29 – July 25, 2007 | Maria Watches Over Us 3rd | 5 | Studio Deen | Yukihiro Matsushita | Maria-sama ga miteru 〜 3 rd 〜 | |
| December 30 –April 25, 2007 | The Galaxy Railways: A Letter from the Abandoned Planet | 4 | Planet | Hideaki Oba | Ginga tetsudō monogatari ~ wasure rareta toki no wakusei ~ | |

== See also ==
- 2006 in Japanese television
- 2006 in Italian television
- 2006 in Serbia
- 2006 in animation
- 2006 in television
