= List of MegaMan NT Warrior episodes (Beast and Beast+) =

The logo of the Beast season of the List of MegaMan NT Warrior episodes anime series

The anime series, MegaMan NT Warrior, known as Rockman EXE (ロックマンエグゼビ, Rokkuman Eguze) in Japan, is produced by Xebec and are based on the Mega Man Battle Network game series. The fourth and fifth season of the series, titled as Rockman EXE Beast (ロックマンエグゼビースト, Rokkuman Eguze Bīsuto) and Rockman EXE Beast + (ロックマンエグゼビースト+, Rokkuman Eguze Bīsuto Purasu) respectively, are based on elements from Mega Man Battle Network 6. Rockman EXE Beast aired between October 1, 2005, and April 1, 2006, on TV Tokyo. Rockman EXE Beast + episodes were twelve minutes in length compared to the previous seasons and were aired between April 8, 2006, and September 30, 2006. No English localization for the fourth and fifth season are currently planned, but they did reuse some background elements in MegaMan Star Force's English dub.

Rockman EXE Beast used two pieces of theme music: a single opening and a single ending theme. The opening theme is lit. "Song of Victory" (勝利のうた, "Shouri no Uta") by Ryouta & Shinsaku and the ending theme is lit. Footprints (あしあと, Ashiato) by Clair. Rockman EXE Beast + did not use any theme music.

Rockman EXE Beast series were later released in eight DVD volumes by Pony Canyon between July 26, 2006, and November 15, 2006. Rockman EXE Beast + was released in four DVD volumes between December 20, 2006, and January 18, 2007.

== Episodes list ==
=== Season 4: Beast ===
No.	Title	Directed by	Written by	Original release date
1	"Beyondard"; Transliteration: "Biyondādo" (Japanese: ビヨンダード)	Yasunori Urata	Kenichi Araki	October 1, 2005
2	"Zoanoroid"; Transliteration: "Zoanoroido" (Japanese: ゾアノロイド)	Kimiharu Mutō	Katsuhiko Chiba	October 8, 2005
3	"Copyroid"; Transliteration: "Kopīroido" (Japanese: コピーロイド)	Yukio Kuroda	Masashi Kubota	October 15, 2005
4	"The Foghorn that Calls the Phantom"; Transliteration: "Onibi o yobu muteki" (Japanese: 鬼火を呼ぶ霧笛)	Shigeru Ueda	Mayori Sekijima	October 22, 2005
5	"Rampaging Display"; Transliteration: "Bōsō disupurei" (Japanese: 暴走ディスプレイ)	Kimiharu Mutō	Naoko Marukawa	October 29, 2005
6	"Net Navi Remodeling Scheme"; Transliteration: "Nettonabi kaizō keigaku" (Japanese: ネットナビ改造計画)	Tsuyoshi Nagasawa	Kenichi Araki	November 5, 2005
7	"Capture Rockman!"; Transliteration: "Rokkuman o hokaku seyo!" (Japanese: ロックマンを捕獲せよ！)	Yukio Kuroda	Mayori Sekijima	November 12, 2005
8	"Green-Eyed Transfer Student"; Transliteration: "Midori no hitomi no yenkōsei" (Japanese: みどりの瞳の転校生)	Kimiharu Mutō	Katsuhiko Chiba	November 19, 2005
9	"Icy Heart"; Transliteration: "Koori no kokoro" (Japanese: 氷の心)	Daisuke Tsukushi	Kenichi Yamada	November 26, 2005
10	"Aiming for Trill"; Transliteration: "Nerawareta Toriru" (Japanese: 狙われたトリル)	Yukio Kuroda	Masashi Kubota	December 3, 2005
11	"Ocean Bottom SOS"; Transliteration: "Kaitei SOS" (Japanese: 海底SOS)	Yasunori Urata	Katsuhiko Chiba	December 10, 2005
12	"Trill's Secret"; Transliteration: "Toriru no himitsu" (Japanese: トリルの秘密)	Kimiharu Mutō	Mayori Sekijima	December 17, 2005
13	"Synchronizer"; Transliteration: "Shinkuronaizā" (Japanese: シンクロナイザー)	Yukio Kuroda	Kenichi Araki	December 24, 2005
14	"Beyondard 2"; Transliteration: "Biyondādo 2" (Japanese: ビヨンダード2)	Tsuyoshi Nagasawa	Kenichi Araki	January 7, 2006
15	"The Railroad Kingdom"; Transliteration: "Tetsuro no ōkoku" (Japanese: 鉄路の王国)	Kimiharu Mutō	Naoko Marukawa	January 14, 2006
16	"Cooking is Love!"; Transliteration: "Ryōri wa aijō!" (Japanese: 料理は愛情！)	Shigeru Ueda	Mayori Sekijima	January 21, 2006
17	"Sage Feng Tian"; Transliteration: "Fūten rōshi" (Japanese: 風天老師)	Yukio Kuroda	Masashi Kubota	January 28, 2006
18	"Rocks of Steel"; Transliteration: "Kōtetsu no iwa" (Japanese: 鋼鉄の岩)	Kimiharu Mutō	Kenichi Yamada	February 4, 2006
19	"The Secret of the Lake"; Transliteration: "Mizuumi no himitsu de a~ru" (Japanese: 湖の秘密であ～る)	Yasunori Urata	Katsuhiko Chiba	February 11, 2006
20	"Dimensional Area Laboratory"; Transliteration: "Dimenshonaru eria kenkyūjo" (Japanese: ディメンショナルエリア研究所)	Yukio Kuroda	Kenichi Araki	February 25, 2006
21	"Falzer Invasion!"; Transliteration: "Faruzā shūrai!" (Japanese: ファルザー襲来！)	Kimiharu Mutō	Katsuhiko Chiba	March 4, 2006
22	"The Boy Called Death"; Transliteration: "Shinigami to yobareta shōnen" (Japanese: 死神と呼ばれた少年)	Tsuyoshi Nagasawa	Mayori Sekijima	March 11, 2006
23	"Colonel's Rampage"; Transliteration: "Kāneru bōsō" (Japanese: カーネル暴走)	Yukio Kuroda	Masashi Kubota	March 18, 2006
24	"Wily's Laboratory"; Transliteration: "Wairī kenkyūjo" (Japanese: ワイリー研究所)	Kimiharu Mutō	Kenichi Araki	March 25, 2006
25	"Exceeding Light"; Transliteration: "Hikari o koete" (Japanese: 光を超えて)	Yasunori Urata	Kenichi Araki	April 1, 2006

=== Season 5: Beast+ ===
No.	Title	Directed by	Written by	Original release date
1	"The Name is Zero"; Transliteration: "Sono na wa Zero" (Japanese: その名はゼロ)	Shigeru Ueda	Kenichi Araki	April 8, 2006
2	"Zero Virus"; Transliteration: "Zero uirusu" (Japanese: ゼロウイルス)	Tsuyoshi Nagasawa	Kenichi Araki	April 15, 2006
3	"Zero Invasion"; Transliteration: "Zero shinnyū" (Japanese: ゼロ侵入)	Kimiharu Mutō	Katsuhiko Chiba	April 22, 2006
4	"Sushi Factory Trap"; Transliteration: "Osushi kōjō no wana" (Japanese: お寿司工場の罠)	Kimiharu Mutō	Katsuhiko Chiba	April 29, 2006
5	"Zero's True Character"; Transliteration: "Zero no shōtai" (Japanese: ゼロの正体)	Yasunori Urata	Masashi Kubota	May 6, 2006
6	"Super Cyber Beast Again!"; Transliteration: "Chō dennōjū futatabi!" (Japanese: 超電脳獣 再び！)	Yasunori Urata	Masashi Kubota	May 13, 2006
7	"The Demon Deko"; Transliteration: "Dēmon Deko nano de a~ru" (Japanese: デーモン・デコなのであ～る)	Kimiharu Mutō	Mayori Sekijima	May 20, 2006
8	"Big Things are Good Things!"; Transliteration: "Ōkii koto wa ii koto da puku!" (Japanese: 大きいことはいいことだプク！)	Kimiharu Mutō	Mayori Sekijima	May 27, 2006
9	"Wishing Upon an Empty Can"; Transliteration: "Akikan no negai o" (Japanese: 空き缶に願いを)	Kimiharu Mutō	Kenichi Araki	June 3, 2006
10	"Cross Fusion"; Transliteration: "Kurosu fyūjon de a~ru" (Japanese: クロスフュージョンであ～る)	Kimiharu Mutō	Kenichi Araki	June 10, 2006
11	"The Electel Estate Situation"; Transliteration: "Erekiteru-ke no jijō" (Japanese: エレキテル家の事情)	Yasunori Urata	Naoko Marukawa	June 17, 2006
12	"Electric-Shock Exploration Party!"; Transliteration: "Dengeki tankentai!" (Japanese: 電撃探険隊！)	Yasunori Urata	Naoko Marukawa	June 24, 2006
13	"Here Come the Hole Diggers!"; Transliteration: "Anahori yarō ga yattekita!" (Japanese: 穴掘り野郎がやってきた！)	Kimiharu Mutō	Kenichi Yamada	July 1, 2006
14	"Rampaging Mettool"; Transliteration: "Bōsō Mettōru" (Japanese: 暴走メットール)	Kimiharu Mutō	Kenichi Yamada	July 8, 2006
15	"Mini Mini Typhoon"; Transliteration: "Mini mini taifūn" (Japanese: ミニミニタイフーン)	Yasunori Urata	Katsuhiko Chiba	July 15, 2006
16	"The Keeper of the Law"; Transliteration: "Hō no bannin" (Japanese: 法の番人)	Atsushi Ōtsuki	Masashi Kubota	July 22, 2006
17	"Virus with a Heart"; Transliteration: "Kokoro aru uirusu" (Japanese: 心あるウイルス)	Kimiharu Mutō	Mayori Sekijima	July 29, 2006
18	"Zero's Spirit"; Transliteration: "Zero no tamashii" (Japanese: ゼロの魂)	Kimiharu Mutō	Mayori Sekijima	August 5, 2006
19	"I Want Limited Goods"; Transliteration: "Genteihin hoshii puku" (Japanese: 限定品ほしいプク)	Atsushi Ōtsuki	Yukari Matsumura	August 12, 2006
20	"Iceman the Strongest"; Transliteration: "Saikyō Aisuman" (Japanese: 最強アイスマン)	Yasunori Urata	Katsuhiko Chiba	August 19, 2006
21	"Magician from the Darkness"; Transliteration: "Yami kara no majishan" (Japanese: 闇からのマジシャン)	Kimiharu Mutō	Masashi Kubota	August 26, 2006
22	"Substantiating Phantoms"; Transliteration: "Jittaika suru yūrei" (Japanese: 実体化する幽霊)	Kimiharu Mutō	Mayori Sekijima	September 2, 2006
23	"Jammingman"; Transliteration: "Jaminguman" (Japanese: ジャミングマン)	Kimiharu Mutō	Kenichi Araki	September 9, 2006
24	"Cache"; Transliteration: "Kyasshu" (Japanese: キャッシュ)	Kimiharu Mutō	Kenichi Araki	September 16, 2006
25	"Searching for Tomorrow"; Transliteration: "Ashita o sagashite" (Japanese: 明日をさがして)	Yasunori Urata	Takao Kato	September 23, 2006
26	"Netto + Rockman"; Transliteration: "Netto + Rokkuman" (Japanese: 熱斗+ロックマン)	Atsushi Ōtsuki	Takao Kato	September 30, 2006
