= Yonna in the Solitary Fortress =

- Theatrical release poster
- Directed by: Kengo Takeuchi
- Production company: CoMix Wave Films
- Release date: April 8, 2006 (Japan)
- Running time: 34 minutes
- Country: Japan
- Language: Japanese

Yonna in the Solitary Fortress (はなれ砦のヨナ, Hanare Toride no Yonna) is a 2006 Japanese anime fantasy adventure short film directed by Kengo Takeuchi. It was released on April 8, 2006.

== Characters ==
- Yonna - a young girl with magical powers, who lives in an isolated tower with her brother Stan. Her magic lets her create magical creatures using flower petals.
- Stan - Yonna's much older brother and self-appointed bodyguard. His magic lets him throw lightning balls.
- Piggot - some sort of gargoyle with wings and horns, works for the Monarchy and wants to bring Yonna to them.
- Galda - A boy Yonna's age, and an agent of the Monarchy like Piggot, also sent to bring Yonna out of the fortress.

== Plot Synopsis ==
As a young girl, Yonna and her older brother Stan were orphaned. When it was discovered that they possessed magical abilities, the villagers believed them to be cursed, and they were persecuted and ostracized, eventually even exiled. A few years later, Stan has grown grim but still watches over Yonna. They now live alone in an isolated old fortress where there are no neighbors to cast stones at them. However, a government organization known only as "the Monarchy" is at odds with another organization known as "the Syndicate" and they both wish to capture the two magicians and use their powers to promote their own respective agendas. Nobody from the Syndicate appears in this film, but the Monarchy sends two agents under separate sets of instructions to try to take Yonna back to their headquarters. These orders put Piggot and Galda at odds with Stan, who will kill any intruders in his rage-fueled attempts to keep Yonna safe. Piggot tries to be clever and talk sense into Stan before approaching Yonna, while Galda takes a more direct approach and confronts Yonna. To his surprise, Yonna says she wants to stay in the tower, it is her choice because of the way people have treated her in the past. Even so, she has mixed feelings about her brother because he gets homicidally over-protective of her. But in the end, Galda plays the hero by giving Yonna her freedom instead of bringing her back to Monarchy HQ.

== Reception ==
It was shown at the 6th Waterloo Festival for Animated Cinema and at the 2008 Future Film Festival.
