= Daddy Loves Mommy Best =

Japanese television series

DVD cover

Daddy Loves Mommy Best (誰よりもママを愛す, Dare yori mo Mama o Ai su, 'I love mum more than anyone') is a Japanese TV drama with 11 episodes aired from July 2, 2006, to September 10, 2006, on TBS channel, and tells the story of the members of an unusual family with a stay-at-home father and a working mother.

Kazutoyo Kamon is a Stay-at-home dad. His wife Chiyo is a lawyer.

== Cast ==
- Masakazu Tamura as Kazutoyo Kamon
- Yuki Uchida as Yuki Kamon
- Tetsuji Tamayama as Akira Kamon
- Mitsuki Nagashima as Kaoru Kamon
- Ran Ito as Chiyo Kamon
- Satomi Kobayashi as Kozue Tsunami
- Sadao Abe as Pinko
- Gekidan Hitori as Yamashita
- Seiko Sakurada as Sato
- Umika Kawashima as Tomo Sanada
- Reina Fujii as Kana Yamaguchi
