= Johnny Test season 1 =

Johnny Test
- Season 1
- DVD cover
- Showrunner: Scott Fellows
- No. of episodes: 13 (26 segments)

Release
- Original network: Kids' WB (The WB)
- Original release: September 17, 2005 – July 29, 2006

Season chronology
- Next → Season 2

The first season of the animated television series Johnny Test premiered on Kids' WB on September 17, 2005 with the first episodes "Johnny to the Center of the Earth" and "Johnny X" and ended on July 29, 2006 with episodes "Johnny Dodgeball" and "Johnny & the Attack of the Monster Truck". This was the only season to be traditionally animated utilizing digital ink-and-paint until the Netflix revival, as the next 5 seasons were reanimated in Adobe Flash to save the show's budget.

This season was released on DVD on February 21, 2008 in Region 2. It was also released, along with season two, on DVD in a bundle on February 15, 2011 in Region 1.

== Cast ==
- James Arnold Taylor as Johnny Test
- Louis Chirillo as Dukey
- Brittney Wilson as Mary Test
- Maryke Hendrikse as Susan Test

== Episodes ==
All episodes in this season have been produced by Scott Fellows and Chris Savino and directed by Chris Savino.

No. overall	No. in season	Title	Written by	Storyboard by	Original release date	Show no.	Prod. code	K6−11 rating/share
1	1	"Johnny to the Center of the Earth"	Scott Fellows	Chris Savino & Joe Horne	September 17, 2005	001	257−961	3.0/14 (Note: This episode also received: A 2.2/10 rating with Girls 2−11; A 2.4/11 rating with Girls 6−11; A 2.3/10 rating with Kids 2−11)
1	1	"Johnny X"	Scott Fellows	Mike Kazaleh	September 17, 2005	001	257−962	3.0/14
Things have been mysteriously pulled underground, making Johnny believe that the people behind this are mole people. Susan and Mary let Johnny use their drill vehicle, and when they get to the center of the Earth, the stolen items turn out to be from mole people after all, but before Johnny could stop them, the mole people capture him. Susan and Mary's supposed boyfriend Gil, is turned into a monkey, so Johnny and Dukey become superheroes.
2	2	"Johnny vs. Bling-Bling Boy"	Scott Fellows	Atomic Cartoons	September 24, 2005	002	257−963	3.0
2	2	"Johnny Impossible"	Scott Fellows	Brian Larsen	September 24, 2005	002	257−964	3.0
Bling-Bling Boy has stolen the Alchamy 5000, a device that turns things into gold and Johnny must get it back before dinnertime. Johnny tries to get his baseball back from an old man before the baseball game starts.
3	3	"Johnny Test: Party Monster"	Cynthia True	Brian Larsen	October 1, 2005	004	257−969	3.3
3	3	"Johnny Test: Extreme Crime Stopper"	Scott Fellows	Mike Kazaleh	October 1, 2005	004	257−968	3.3
Susan and Mary are having a party and use the Phero-Booster on Johnny in order to make him look good so all the girls at the party will love him, but Johnny turns into a monster. The Extreme Teen Team, a group of evil young skateboarders, are on the loose stealing stuff and it's up to Johnny to bring them down.
4	4	"Deep Sea Johnny" "Aqua-Johnny"	Lazar Saric	Jun Falkenstein	October 8, 2005	003	257−965	2.8
4	4	"Johnny & the Amazing Turbo Action Backpack"	Eddie Guzelian	Atomic Cartoons	October 8, 2005	003	257−966	2.8
Johnny uses an invention to breathe underwater, yet reversing the process causes a shark, squid, and electric eels to begin walking on land and wreak havoc to the beach. Johnny gets an amazing Turbo Action Backpack that can do everything to replace his Baby Barf Backpack that can do absolutely nothing, but Bling-Bling Boy steals it and Johnny must retrieve it so Susan and Mary can show it off at the school science fair.
5	5	"Johnny and the Ice Pigs"	John Derevlany	Scott Shaw!	October 29, 2005	005	257−967	2.7
5	5	"Johnny's House of Horrors"	Eddie Guzelian	Jun Falkenstein	October 29, 2005	005	257−971	2.7
Johnny goes back in time to ask Thomas Edison for a hockey invention and then to gather all of the vicious and ruthless "legends" he could find, in order to form a hockey team which will help the Ice Pigs win a game. Johnny fills the house with some of Hugh's favorite things listed in his dream journal. However, Johnny learns that he accidentally used Hugh's nightmare journal, full of Hugh's least favorite things (most of them are scary). To make matters worse, Lila's boss is coming over for dinner that night.
6	6	"Johnny's Super Smarty Pants"	Madellaine Paxson	Joe Banaszkiewicz	November 5, 2005	006	257−970	N/A
6	6	"Take Your Johnny to Work Day"	Scott Fellows	Karl Toerge	November 5, 2005	006	257−972	N/A
Johnny wears super smarty pants in order to win the love of a genius girl, Janet Nelson Jr. But later, the pants get a mind of their own. Johnny sneaks into Lila's car along with Susan and Mary on Take Your Daughter to Work Day, thinking that it's unfair that girls don't have to go to school on this day, but boys do. When the kids get to Lila's workplace, they sneak into a lab and accidentally release a missile.
7	7	"Johnny and the Mega Roboticles"	Scott Fellows	Mike Kazaleh	November 12, 2005	007	257−973	1.7
7	7	"Johnny Gets Mooned"	Lazar Saric	Pat Ventura	November 12, 2005	007	257−974	1.7
Johnny brings a toy, Nasteria, to life. But the toy decides to destroy Porkbelly. Now Johnny needs to stop the evil action figure with a toy force, led by Nasteria's arch enemy, Mega Roboticle. Johnny steals a rocket his sisters made to travel to the Moon so he can write his report. Unexpectedly, he battles some Moon monsters and rescues Canadian astronauts.
8	8	"Johnny Hollywood"	Scott Fellows	Jun Falkenstein	November 19, 2005	008	257−976	N/A
8	8	"Johnny's Turbo Time Rewinder"	John Derevlany	Brian Larsen	November 19, 2005	008	257−975	N/A
When Dad refuses to let him watch it, Johnny uses a gadget invented by Susan and Mary to travel into a movie, The Quickest and the Monkiest. However, the power goes out and Johnny and Dukey are stuck inside. His sisters find out and research the movie's blog, as it contains a bad ending where the protagonists end up falling down the Grand Canyon in their car to get away from the police. Now Susan and Mary have to go in the movie to save Johnny and Dukey. Johnny's sisters invent a time rewinder that can go back up to 5 minutes and they use it to get Johnny in trouble by breaking Hugh's favorite bowling ball, resulting in Johnny getting grounded from his bicycle and skateboard for 2 months. Infuriated, he tries multiple times to steal this, but he fails; eventually, he gets a similar one from Bling-Bling Boy. Bling-Bling's time rewinder helped Johnny get his skateboard and bicycle back by finding one of Hugh's shoes.
9	9	"The Return of Johnny X"	Scott Fellows	Milton Knight	November 26, 2005	009	257−978	2.3/8
9	9	"Sonic Johnny"	Cynthia True	Brian Larsen	November 26, 2005	009	257−977	2.3/8
Johnny becomes Johnny X again in order to take down Bling-Bling's latest evil invention, Repto-Slicer. Johnny and Dukey try Susan and Mary's ultimate scooter and travel into the future where they find they are wanted by the police.
10	10	"The Dog Days of Johnny"	Michael Preister	Mike Kazaleh	February 11, 2006	010	257−979	1.8/8
10	10	"Johnny's Pink Plague"	John Derevlany	Nora Johnson	February 11, 2006	010	257−980	1.8/8
Tired of his annoying habits, Susan and Mary put a device on Dukey, making him respond to every one of their commands. Johnny has no idea why Dukey is with Susan and Mary, but when he finds out, he tries to take the collar off. Johnny uses a device to free everyone of zits. But what happens when Johnny finds out the device was unstable?
11	11	"Johnny's Extreme Game Controller"	Scott Fellows	Brian Larsen	February 18, 2006	011	257−981	2.2/9
11	11	"Li'l Johnny"	Lazar Saric	Jun Falkenstein	February 18, 2006	011	257−982	2.2/9
Johnny uses a Mega Action Game Controller to control people, but Hugh gets his hands on it and begins affecting Johnny in the process. Johnny accidentally shrinks himself and Dukey into a sub-atomic universe while shrinking his toys. Unexpectedly, it's nature's turn against him.
12	12	"Johnny vs. Brain Freezer"	Gene Grillo	Brian Larsen	July 22, 2006	012	257−984	1.0/8
12	12	"Johnny's Big Snow Job"	Mark Fellows	Brian Larsen	July 22, 2006	012	257−983	1.0/8
A kid at Susan and Mary's school becomes a villain named Brain Freezer. Johnny must stop this villain and unfreeze everyone he froze. Johnny uses a device in Susan and Mary's lab to make it snow outside. But what happens when the whole city becomes snowed over?
13	13	"Johnny Dodgeball"	Chris Brown	Mike Kazaleh	July 29, 2006	013	257−985	1.1/8
13	13	"Johnny & the Attack of the Monster Truck"	Scott Fellows	Jun Falkenstein	July 29, 2006	013	257−986	1.1/8
Johnny uses a bionic arm to magnify his arm strength to beat Sissy at dodgeball. However, it breaks after being exposed to cereal. Eugene brings a living monster truck to the Test house, and it begins to become enraged after Eugene kicks it for not winning Susan's heart. Now, the truck wants to destroy the entire monster truck species and it's up to Johnny to figure out how to stop it.
