= Johnny Test season 2 =

Johnny Test
- Season 2
- DVD cover
- Showrunner: Scott Fellows
- No. of episodes: 13 (26 segments)

Release
- Original network: Kids' WB (The CW); Teletoon
- Original release: October 28, 2006 – May 12, 2007

Season chronology
- ← Previous; Season 1 Next → Season 3

The second season of the animated television series Johnny Test premiered on October 28, 2006 with "Hoist the Johnny Roger" and "Johnny's Turbo Toy Force" and ended on May 12, 2007 with episodes "Johnny X Strikes Back" and "Johnny vs. Super Soaking Cyborgs". This is the first season to use Adobe Flash instead of digital ink-and-paint, and the first to be produced in Canada instead of America. This season is also the first to be produced by Cookie Jar Entertainment (under the Coliseum Entertainment brand for action-adventure shows) and Collideascope Animation.

This season, along with the first, were released on DVD in a bundle on February 15, 2011 in Region 1.

This season marks the first appearance for Ashleigh Ball as the new voice of Mary Test, Sissy Blakely, and Missy.

== Cast ==
- James Arnold Taylor as Johnny Test
- Louis Chirillo as Dukey
- Ashleigh Ball as Mary Test
- Maryke Hendrikse as Susan Test

== Episodes ==
All episodes of this season were directed by Joseph Sherman.

No. overall	No. in season	Title	Written by	Storyboard by	Original release date	Show no.	Prod. code	K6−11 rating/share
14	1	"Hoist the Johnny Roger"	Adam Beechen	Julian Harris	October 28, 2006	014	201B	1.6/7
14	1	"Johnny's Turbo Toy Force"	Scott Fellows	Jeff Barker	October 28, 2006	014	201A	1.6/7
Johnny and Dukey go back in time to learn about pirates, but they find themselves on pathetic pirate Nobeard's ship, and must get his treasure from his brother Blackbeard to help Nobeard impress his father Greybeard. An evil toymaker named Wacko gives out robots to all the children of Porkbelly, which imprison them. The gang seeks assistance from the Turbo Toy Force.
15	2	"JTV"	Scott Fellows	Dave Pemberton	November 4, 2006	015	202A	1.8/8
15	2	"Johnny vs. Bling Bling 2"	Scott Fellows	Jeff Barker	November 4, 2006	015	203B	1.8/8
Johnny starts his own channel over the EBC, a channel which only broadcasts emergencies and tests. Later, the army needs the channel for a runaway plane. Eugene creates a device that reverts himself, Johnny, and Dukey back into young children, interfering with Johnny's video game showdown with Sissy.
16	3	"Johnnyland"	Mark Fellows	John Lei	November 11, 2006	016	204A	1.7/7
16	3	"Johnny's Got a Brand New Dad"	Adam Beechen	Dmitri Kostic	November 11, 2006	016	203A	1.7/7
Johnny makes a theme park called Johnnyland in the backyard. However, Hugh demands the park be torn down, later stumbling into an unstable ride with Lila. Johnny’s dad’s constant sayings of "no" begin to infuriate Johnny, so, with Susan and Mary's help, they make a new dad. However, when the new dad gets exposed to the plutonium he got for Susan and Mary, things start to turn out ugly.
17	4	"Saturday Night's Alright for Johnny"	Scott Gray	Julian Harris	November 18, 2006	017	204B	2.0/8
17	4	"Johnny Mint Chip"	Mark Fellows	Derek Jessome & Jeff Knott	November 18, 2006	017	202B	2.0/8
Johnny is trying to have the perfect Saturday, but Sissy ruins it by trying to practice William Tell archery on Johnny. Johnny then uses Susan and Mary's Saturday Repeater machine to try again. Johnny, Dukey, and the sisters go to an ice cream factory, in order to get the recipe for mint chip ice cream which Johnny and Dukey can't stop eating.
18	5	"Johnny's Pet Day"	Adam Beechen	Dave Pemberton	February 3, 2007	018	208	N/A
18	5	"Phat Johnny"	Scott Fellows	Julian Harris	February 3, 2007	018	208	N/A
Dukey gets jealous when Johnny takes Repto-Slicer to school for Pet Day and not him. However, this lands him into danger of becoming a TV star. An accident in Eugene's lab leaves Johnny overweight like him. Johnny uses his weight to become a rapper and to get a video game that he wanted. However, karma is after him and ruins his experience.
19	6	"The Revenge of Johnny X"	Scott Fellows	Kevin Currie	February 10, 2007	019	205B	2.1/8
19	6	"The Enchanted Land of Johnnia"	Cynthia True	Dave Pemberton	February 10, 2007	019	205A	2.1/8
Bling-Bling Boy's Ailen pod captures Susan. Now Johnny and Dukey must defeat Bling-Bling boy and save Susan. Johnny and Dukey catch rainy day boredom, and use one of the sisters' devices, thinking that it is an inter-dimensional travel machine, and go into a land known as Johnnia.
20	7	"101 Johnnies"	Scott Fellows	Naeim Khavari	February 17, 2007	020	207	1.8/7
20	7	"Johnny Zombie Tea Party"	Scott Fellows	Frank Ramirez	February 17, 2007	020	207	1.8/7
Johnny accidentally makes 100 robot clones of himself in order to do his chores for him, but the clones become defective soon after. Johnny brings Porkbelly's founders back to life in order to help with his report.
21	8	"Johnny Test in Black & White"	Scott Fellows	Jeff Barker	February 24, 2007	021	206	2.1/8
21	8	"Johnny the Kid"	Mark Fellows	Dan Nosella	February 24, 2007	021	206	2.1/8
The general tells Black & White to spy on Susan and Mary. This leads to Johnny and Dukey shrinking themselves, and end up in Mr. Black's brain to make him forget that the General told Mr. Black and Mr. White to spy on Susan and Mary to stop them from doing dangerous experiments. Johnny and his family go on a vacation to a dude ranch on Susan and Mary's choice, but it is invaded by an outlaw motorcycle club shortly after they arrive. With help from Bling-Bling Boy and Gil, both of whom have also taken a trip to the ranch, the Tests resolve to stop the bikers from ruining their fun and take back their holiday.
22	9	"Down Hill Johnny"	Scott Fellows	Dave Pemberton	March 3, 2007	022	211B	1.5/6
22	9	"Johnny Meets the Pork-Ness Monster"	Mark Fellows	John Williamson & Frank Ramirez	March 3, 2007	022	209A	1.5/6
Johnny goes to the Behemoth, the ultimate downhill ski resort. However, he has to find ways to go downhill since the ski captain doesn't let kids under 13 go. It is a hot day and Johnny's family cannot seem to find a place where they can cool off and get wet. They go to Lake Pork-Ness, which is rumored to have a monster inhabitant. Susan and Mary believe that the idea is a total myth and try to prove there are no monsters in the lake. The Pork-Ness monster is found, but is turned out to be a robot.
23	10	"Johnny X Strikes Back"	Scott Fellows	Dave Pemberton	April 21, 2007	023	213	1.8/7
23	10	"Johnny vs. Super Soaking Cyborgs"	Brian Cahill	Charles E. Bastien	April 21, 2007	023	213	1.8/7
Five villains who have been defeated previously by Johnny (Wacko, the Bee Keeper, Brain Freezer, Mr. Mittens, and Albert the butler) team up and kidnap him. Now it's up to Susan, Mary, Dukey, Bling-Bling, Gil, and Bumper to save him. The Twins invent Boyborgs to make Gil go crazy with jealousy. Unfortunately, the Boyborgs decide to eliminate Gil after finding out that the Twins love him more than them.
24	11	"00-Johnny"	Scott Fellows	Jeff Barker	April 28, 2007	024	212	1.8/7
24	11	"Johnny of the Jungle"	Scott Fellows	Naeim Khavari	April 28, 2007	024	212	1.8/7
Tim Burnout steals blueprints of the girls' original plan to alternate Dukey and uses it on his cat, Mr. Mittens. But he becomes evil and now it's up to Johnny and Dukey to stop him. While on a class trip to the safari park with Dukey disguised as Johnny's dad, Johnny and Dukey decide to help animals get to their homeland in Africa.
25	12	"Johnny vs. Smash Badger 3"	Scott Fellows	Naeim Khavari	May 5, 2007	025	210B	1.3/6
25	12	"Johnny Bee Good"	Kevin Hopps	Kevin Currie	May 5, 2007	025	211A	1.3/6
While trying to figure out some cheat codes from his video game, Johnny accidentally brings Smash Badger to life. The Bee Keeper steals all the candy in Porkbelly and it's up to Johnny, Dukey, and the girls to stop him.
26	13	"The Good, the Bad & the Johnny"	Lazar Saric	Jeff Barker	May 12, 2007	026	210A	2.0/8
26	13	"Rock-a-Bye Johnny"	Scott Fellows	Dan Nosella	May 12, 2007	026	209B	2.0/8
To control Johnny's frequent bad behavior, the girls split his bad genes to make his genes 100% good. The bad gene later gets a life of its own, making two Johnnys, one nice and one evil. Dukey keeps Johnny up all night with his pillow fights and Johnny goes to the sisters to get some sleep. But Johnny misfires and causes his parents to go sleepwalking.
