= Thai comics =

Comics written and produced in Thailand

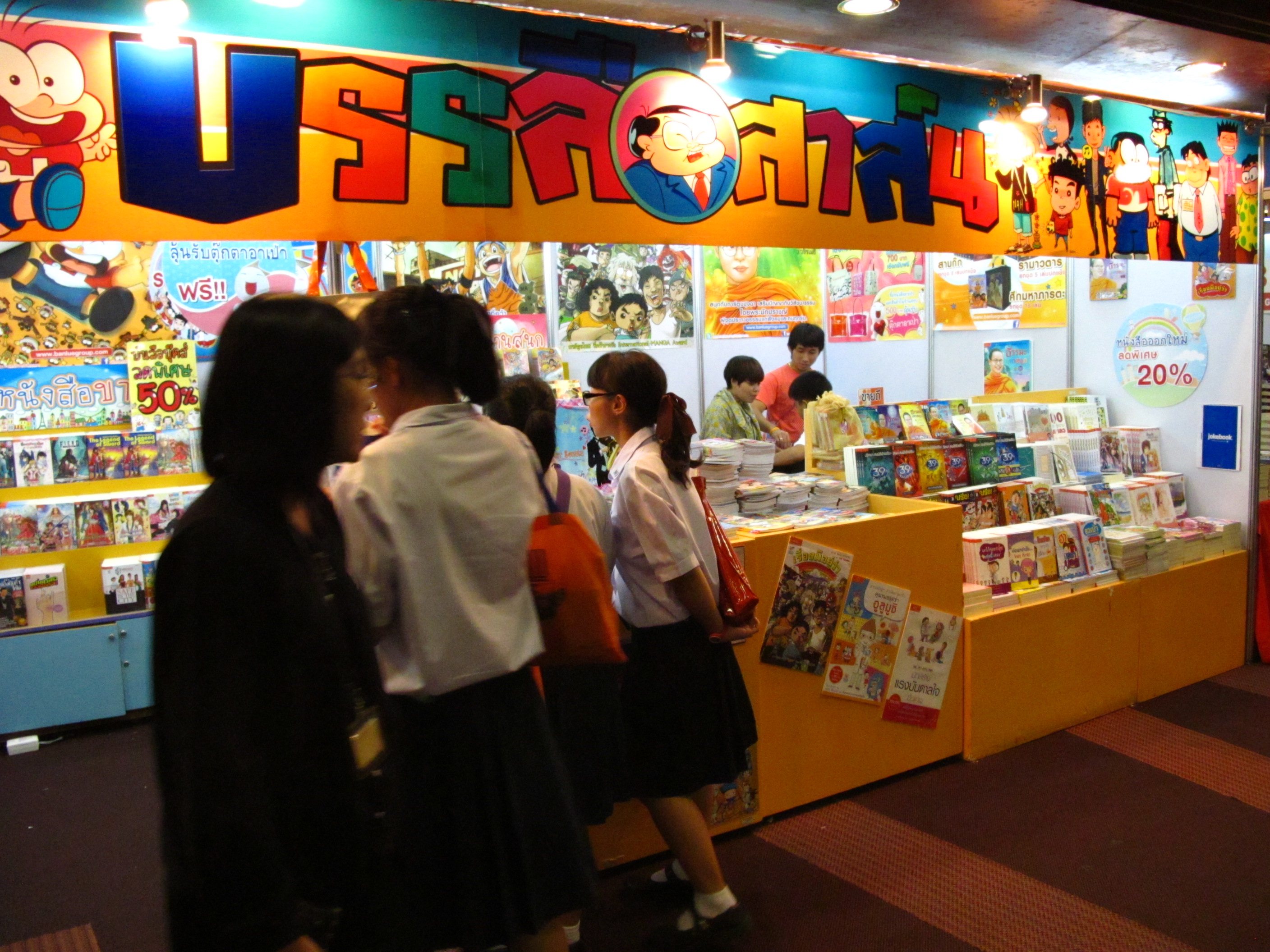
Banluesarn booth at a book fair.

Thai comics (Thai: หนังสือการ์ตูนไทย) are comics created and produced by Thai cartoonists (Thai: นักวาดการ์ตูน). Thai comics have a long history that dates back to the early 20th century. The industry saw significant growth during the 1980s and 1990s with the emergence of several successful comic series. Today, in addition to traditional printed comics, web comics have also gained popularity in Thailand.

== History ==
=== Early days ===
The first recognized cartoon in Thailand was made during the reign of King Rama V, which appeared in the magazine Samran Wittaya (Thai: สำราญวิทยา, lit. 'Enjoyable Knowledge') in January 1907. The cartoon depicted a Chinese pork seller, a dog, a chair, and a pork leg, and included a riddle in the form of a poem.

Cartooning in Thailand gained momentum during the reign of King Rama VI, who was not only interested in drawing but also exposed to British political cartoons during his education at Oxford University. In 1917, he coined the Thai word "Paap Lor"^{[A]} (Thai: ภาพล้อ) as a term for "cartoon"^{[B]}, which helped to establish the medium in Thailand.In 1920, the King held an amateur drawing competition among state officials, which included three categories: "Paap Lor", creative drawings, and realistic drawings. These categories indicated that cartoons had been distinguished from other styles of art.

In 1923, Pleng Tri-Pin (Thai: เปล่ง ไตรปิ่น) won a royally-endorsed competition and became Thailand's first political cartoonist after being hired by Krungthep Daily Mail. Pleng, who had earlier traveled to Europe on a commercial vessel to study art, returned to Thailand with knowledge of using metal blocks for the press, which was a new technology in Thailand at the time. This enabled him to speed up the process of publishing cartoons in the newspapers and encouraged other cartoonists to produce more works. Pleng's contributions to Thai cartooning earned him the title "Khun Patipak Pimlikit" (Thai: ขุนปฏิภาคพิมพ์ลิขิต, lit. 'The Nobleman Who Prints Like Writing') from the King.

The artistic roots of Thai comics can be found in paintings of local ghosts based on stories of Thai folklore, appearing during the reign of King Nangklao in the early 19th century.

=== Emerging era ===
After the Siamese Revolution of 1932, several newspapers and magazines in Thailand started featuring cartoons and comic strips. Popular cartoonists of the time included Sawas Jutharop (Thai: สวัสดิ์ จุฑะรพ), Fuen Rod-Ari (Thai: ฟื้น รอดอริห์), Jamnong Rod-Ari (Thai: จำนงค์ รอดอริห์), Witt Sutthasatien (Thai: วิตต์ สุทธิเสถียร), and Chant Suwannaboon (Thai: ฉันท์ สุวรรณบุณย์). Sawas Jutharop, one of the popular cartoonists in the early period of Thai cartooning, is known for his notable works such as "Sang Thong" (Thai: สังข์ทอง), a fable about a boy who lives in a conch, which was published in Siam Ratsadon from 1932 to 1933. He later created more series based on Thai fables, and developed a main character named Khun Muen (Thai: ขุนหมื่น), who was Popeye-like in appearance and became so popular that he became a logo on young people's clothing.During this time cartoons were also used to disseminate propaganda.

However, the newspaper industry and comic strips were temporarily frozen during World War II. After the war, Thai cartooning resumed and the period from 1953 to 1962 was called "the golden age of Thai cartoons". Among the famous and influential cartoonists of this era were Adirek Ariyamontri (Thai: อดิเรก อารยมนตรี), Mongkol Wongudom (Thai: มงคล วงศ์อุดม), Weerakul Thongnoi (Thai: วีรกุล ทองน้อย, pen name: Por. Bangplee Thai: พ. บางพลี), Pimon Kalasee (Thai: พิมล กาฬสีห์), and Sa-Ngob Jampat (Thai: สงบ แจ่มพัฒน์). Prayoon Chanyawongs (Thai: ประยูร จรรยาวงศ์, pen name: Suklek and Chan) was perhaps the most celebrated cartoonist of this early period and became known as the "King of Thai Cartoon." He was the first Asian to win the International Cartoon for Peace Competition in New York in 1960 for his cartoon "The Last Nuclear Test" (Thai: การทดลองระเบิดปรมาณูลูกสุดท้าย). In 1971, he became the only cartoonist to win Asia's prestigious Magsaysay Award for his use of pictorial satire and humor in defense of the public interest for over three decades.

Many other notable works from this era include Thunder Knight (Thai: อัศวินสายฟ้า) by Por. Bangplee, Black Lion (Thai: สิงห์ดำ) by Niwat Taraphan (Thai: นิวัฒน์ ธาราพรรณ), Chaochaiphomthong (Thai: เจ้าชายผมทอง) by Julasakk Amornvej (Thai: จุลศักดิ์ อมรเวช), and many more. In the same decade, a publishing company named Plaeunchit (Thai: เพลินจิต) began to publish novels or pulp fiction in the market, featuring legendary artists such as Heam Vejjakorn (Thai: เหม เวชกร), Witt Sutthasatien, and Sanea Klaykleaun (Thai: เสน่ห์ คล้ายเคลื่อน) who began their careers.

=== Early 2000s–present ===
Between the 1970s and 1980s, the comics market in Thailand was flooded with many unlicensed comics from foreign countries (most of them Japanese) for many years, until only two genres of Thai comics survived on the market: one-baht comics (Thai: การ์ตูนเล่มละบาท), which were small books of comics with cheap paper that sold for only 1 baht and contained horror or ghost stories, and humor comics like Kai Hua Roh (Thai: ขายหัวเราะ) from Bunluesarn. While some creators or publishers tried to produce quality comics or magazines, they were not very successful.

During the 1990s, after fixed copyright laws were used in Thailand, every publisher in the country began to license manga from Japan legitimately, and several new comics were created and inspired by Japanese manga. A notable example is Thai Comics Magazine (Thai: ไทยคอมิค) from Vibulkij Publishing, which had an anthology format that showcased the work of young and upcoming talented artists from various publishing companies that supported the work of Thai cartoonists. Famous comic series like PangPond (Thai: ไอ้ตัวเล็ก), Knife 13th (Thai: มีดที่สิบสาม), JOE the SEA-CRET Agent, and Hesheit (Thai: ฮีชีอิท) shared the market with manga.

In the early 2000s, many famous comics by Thai creators resurfaced. Among these famous Thai comics was Apaimanee Saga, created by Supot Anawatkochakron (Thai: สุพจน์ อนวัชกชกร, pen name: SUPOT.A), which was the first Thai comic to be translated into French. PangPond, a popular comedy comic, was turned into an animation. Additionally, "13 Quiz Show", a short story in the comics series My Mania (Thai: รวมเรื่องสั้นจิตหลุด), was adapted into the famous feature film 13 Beloved. Chaiyan Suyawech (Thai: ชัยยันต์ สุยะเวช), also known by the pen name Tapone (Thai: ตาโปน), is a renowned cartoonist who helped elevate the Thai comic industry. He contributed to the industry with works such as The Crocodile Crisis (Thai: ไกรทอง), Khaki (Thai: กากี), Takraw (Thai: ตะกร้อ), The Cabalist (Thai: หาญสู้ผีนรก), Hot Beach: Duck & Swan (Thai: ตบแหลก), Orin and Jinna (Thai: โอริณกับจิณนา), Petch Phra Uma (Thai: เพชรพระอุมา), Luk Mai (Thai: ลูกไม้), and many others.

Various publishing companies like Bunlausarn, Vibulkij, Siam Inter Comics, Nation Edutainment, Bongkoch, EQ+, or Punica supported Thai artists consistently, and with a lot of movement from alternative and indie Thai comic creators like Eakasit Thairaat (Thai: เอกสิทธิ์ ไทยรัตน์), Wisut Ponnimit (Thai: วิศุทธิ์ พรนิมิตร), Ongart Chaichancheap (Thai: องอาจ ชัยชาญชีพ), Songsin Thewsomboon (Thai: ทรงศิลป์ ทิวสมบุญ), and Veerachai Duangpla (Thai: วีระชัย ดวงพลา). Magazines like Thai Comics and Let's Comics helped shape the industry for the next decade.

Thailand's comic industry has seen remarkable growth in recent years, with the emergence of talented artists and the advent of digital platforms making it easier for readers to access their works. One such artist is Jakraphan Huaypetch (Thai: จักรพันธ์ ห้วยเพชร), also known as Ton, whose works include the football-themed comic series The Killer Pass (Thai: ดาวเตะฟ้าประทาน) and the basketball-themed comic series Super Dunker (Thai: สตรีทบอลสะท้านฟ้า) have won him numerous accolades, including the Gold Award at the 3rd International Manga Awards in 2009. Another notable Thai comic series is EXEcutional (Thai: เอ็กซีคิวชั่นแนล มหาสงครามออนไลน์ถล่มจักรวาล), a long-running series written and illustrated by Panuwat Wattananukul (Thai: ภานุวัฒน์ วัฒนนุกูล). The series began publication in 2006 and ran until 2022, with 50 volumes, 1 special volume (equivalent to 15.5 volumes), 3 novels, and 8 volumes of Executional Remaster being released. The series has gained a dedicated following and limited editions of the books are highly sought after. In addition to EXEcutional, another standout Thai comic series is Garin's Uncanny File (Thai: การิน ปริศนาคดีอาถรรพ์), published by Punica Comic Publishing. The success of this Thai horror-fantasy themed series led to the creation of their own universe of content, including fantasy and mystery comics, as seen in the anthology series Blacx Magazine.

Other notable Thai cartoonists include Sinad Jaruatjanapat (Thai: สินาด จารุอรรถจนภัทร), known for his skilled illustrations in the Thai comic series Pinto Love in a Lunchbox (Thai: ปิ่นโต). His fine-lined artwork beautifully depicts Thai traditional food. The series has also been adapted into an animation, currently in the works. There is also Skan Srisuwan (Thai: สกาล ศรีสุวรรณ), a veteran CG artist who collaborated with Stan Lee on a graphic novel adaptation of William Shakespeare's Romeo and Juliet titled Romeo & Juliet: The War, a sci-fi adaptation of the classic novel that is planned to be adapted into a movie. Other talented Thai cartoonists include Art Gino, Pitsinee Tangkittinun, and Chalisa Limpipolphaiboon (pen name: Amulin). These are just a few examples of the many talented Thai cartoonists who continue to contribute to the country's rich comic culture.

With the rise of digital platforms such as Comico, Line Webtoon, Meb:E-Book, NEKOPOST, Ookbee comic, WeComics TH, Vibulkij, Facebook pages, and more, Thai comic creators have more avenues than ever to reach a wider audience. Many of these platforms offer both free and paid content, making it easier for readers to access their favorite comics from the comfort of their mobile devices.

== List of Thai comics [th] ==
Series	Author(s)	Volumes	Publication	Publisher
Apaimanee Saga อภัยมณี ซาก้า	Supot Anawatkochakron	16	2001	Nation Edutaiment
Apaimanee Saga: The Pirates Dawn อภัยมณี ซาก้า: รุ่งอรุณแห่งโจรสลัด	Supot Anawatkochakron	17	2007	Nation Edutainment
Apaimanee Saga: The Tales Of Two Brothers	Supot Anawatkochakron	5	2014–present	Nation Edutainment
Black Lion สิงห์ดำ	Raj Leausraung	50	1961	Various
Chaochaiphompthong เจ้าชายผมทอง	Jukk Bieausakul	50	1958	Various
Dying Symphony เสียงสุดท้ายแห่งท่วงทำนอง	Thidaratt Seathang	18 (Complete)	2006	Vibulkij
EXEcutional เอ็กซีคิวชั่นแนล	Panuwat Wattananukul	50 (Complete)	2005–2022	CartoonThai Studio
Fire Head & Beansprout ถั่วงอกกับหัวไฟ	Songsin Theawsomboon	9	2007	a book
Garin's Uncanny File การิน ปริศนาคดีอาถรรพ์	Aii/Black Tohfu	30	2008-2024	Punica Comic
Ghost Wild ป่าผี	Abest Limlamai	34 (Complete)	2002	Vibulkij
hesheit ฮีชีอิท	Wisut Ponnimit	10		B.Boyd.CG
Holiday Howl ฮอลิเดย์ ฮาวล์	Gousin Jieamshuroj	20	2008	Cartoon Thai Studio
Innocent Series	Veerachai Duangpla	1 (Complete)	2007	Let's Comics
JOE the SEA-CRET Agent	Suthichat Saraphaiwanit	10	1998	B.Boyd.CG/Nation Edutainment
Khun Muen ขุนหมื่น	Sawas Jutharop			
Knife 13th มีดที่สิบสาม	Booncherd Champrasert; Nop Withoonthong	82 (Complete)	1994- 2026	Nation Edutainment (Now Self Published)
LaFlora, the Princess Academy ลา ฟลอร่า โรงเรียนป่วนก๊วนเจ้าหญิง	Various	57	2009	E.Q.Plus
My Mania รวมเรื่องสั้นจิตหลุด	Eakasit Thairaat	3	2004-2014	Vibulkij Publishing/ Let's Comic
Ogre King อหังการ์ราชันย์ยักษ์	Montri Kumrean/Aruntiwa Wattcharapornpongsa	21 (Complete)	2009	Cartoon Thai Studio
Send Back เซ็นด์แบ็ค	Nuttapol Kittikunatam	6 (cancel)	2009	Cartoon Thai Studio
Super Dunker สตรีทบอลสะท้านฟ้า	Chakapan Huaiphet	12 (Complete)	2009	Banluesarn
Super Bamboo Shoot ซูเปอร์หน่อไม้ แสบนี้ไม่มีเบรค	Adisak Phongsamphan	47	2001	Vibulkij
The Killer Pass ดาวเตะฟ้าประทาน	Chakapan Huaiphet	Web Comics	2020	TKO Comics
The Mavericks เดอะ มาเวอริคส์	Danai Samutkojorn/Kampol Seeaw	6 (cancel)	2013	Nation Edutainment
The Spirit King ล่าพันธุ์สมิง	Aekkaphop Lakornkeaw	38 (Complete)	2007	Vibulkij
Thunder Knight อัศวินสายฟ้า	Weerakul Thongnoi	19	1957	Various
Watermelon Head หัวแตงโม	Aongart Chaichancheap	5	2003	Self Published

=== Weekly comic books ===
- Kai Hua Roh (ขายหัวเราะ)
- MahaSanook (มหาสนุก)
- Noo Hin Inter (หนูหิ่น อินเตอร์)
- Neoz Magazine (นิตยสาร นีออซ)

== See also ==
- Thai animation
- Manga
