= Kai Hua Roh =

- Categories: Humor comic
- Frequency: Semimonthly
- Founder: Vithit Utsahajit
- Founded: 1973
- Company: Banluesarn
- Country: Thailand
- Language: Thai
- ISSN: 0858-1479

Kai Hua Roh (Thai: ขายหัวเราะ; RTGS: Khai Hua Ro; lit. 'To Sell Laugh') was a Thai comedy comic book launched in 1973 by Editor Vithit Utsahajit. Kai Hua Roh content is a comic strip that offers humorous aspects of life, popular culture, society, politics, entertainment and news. The book also includes several articles, short stories, and a guest article from a public figure.

== History ==
First published in 1973 by Vithit Utsahajit, son of Bunluesarn founder Bunlue Utsahajit, the publication aimed to entertain readers at a time when media options were limited..

The name comes from two words: “Kai” (to sell) and “Hua Roh” (laugh). Before publishing the book, Vithit consulted an artist from that era for the name. Initially, Kai Hua Roh was printed on A4-sized paper but later switched to a pocket-sized format for better portability.

After standing on the shelves for a 48 years, Banluesarn stopped selling comics in print on a regular basis turned in to making e-books and online platform instead. The last issue of kai hua roh that was published as a book was issue 1515, released on 11 May 2021

=== Bor Kor Withit ===
Editor Withit (Bor Kor Withit) is the Mascot that is associates to Kai Hua Roh and Mahasanook for a long time. This character was inspired by the Editor in chief Vithit Utsahajit. The appearance of this character is a fat and strict editor who tortures the artists. Editor Withit always changes the appearance to match the trend and culture of the time.

== Spin-off ==
PangPond

PangPond (Thai: ปังปอนด์) Monthly comic book by Tai (Pakdee Saetaweesuk) Comic about PangPond

A Flowergirl and Banana boy

A Flowergirl and Banana boy (Thai: สาวดอกไม้กะนายกล้วยไข่) Monthly comic book by Arifen Hazanee that contains a parody of television drama and comic about mythology.

Noo-Hin Inter

Noo-Hin Inter(Thai: หนูหิ่น อินเตอร์) Monthly comic book by Oah about Noo-Hin, rural teenager who comes into Bangkok to work as a maid at Kun Milk’s house.

== Mahasanook ==
Two years after the first launch of Kai Hua Roh, Bunluesarn published the Mahasanook comic which includes a short story of comic as an additional con. Nowadays, Mahasanook is end publication on issue 1362 in 2021

== Sources ==
Bunlue Group. (n.d.). Bunlue Gtoup : Contract us. Retrieved January 26, 2017, from Bunlue Grup: http://www.banluegroup.com/web/html/about.php

Lent, J. A. (2014). Southeast Asian Cartoon Art: History, Trends and Problems. Jefferson, North Carolina: McFarland & Company.

Thai Printing Association. (n.d.). ขายหัวเราะ ภารกิจแห่งชาติและรางวัลที่คู่ควร. Retrieved January 26, 2017, from สมาคมการพิมพ์ไทย Thai Printing Association: http://www.thaiprint.org/thaiprint/index.php?option=com_zoo&view=item&item_id=608&Itemid=54%5B%5D

Utsahajit, V. (2013, November 4). เกล็ดแป้งทอด: คุยเรื่องการ์ตูนไทยกับ บก.วิธิต ขายหัวเราะ. (ส. เฮ้งสวัสดิ์, Interviewer)

ขายหัวเราะ. (2017). กรุงเทพมหานคร: บรรลือสาส์น.
