= Thai animation =

Animation from Thailand

Thai animation (Thai: แอนิเมชันไทย) has a rich history, dating back to the 1950s with the production of the first Thai animated shorts. Payut Ngaokrachang is considered the founding father of Thai animation. Over the decades, the industry has flourished, earning both local and international recognition. Today, Thailand has established itself as a popular outsourcing destination for animation work, with 91% of its animation studios providing services to international companies. This has boosted exports and raised the profile of Thai animation, earning recognition from the Japan External Trade Organization (JETRO) as the top animation-related business destination in Southeast Asia in 2016.

== History ==
=== Early beginnings ===
Thai animation has a rich history dating back to the mid-20th century. The first Thai animated shorts were created using traditional hand-drawn animation techniques, with "Amazing Incidents" premiering in 1955 at the Sala Chaloem Thai. This animation, which had a runtime of 10 minutes, caught the attention of the American News Agency (USIS) in Bangkok where Payut Ngaokrachang was working as an art officer. Payut, considered a pioneer of Thai animation and a prominent animator and illustrator, was then invited to visit Toho in Japan to receive training in animated film-making. He went on to create "The New Adventures of Hanuman" in 1957, which had a runtime of 14.43 minutes, and "The Children and the Bear" in 1959, which was 14 minutes long. These two animations were created while Payut was working on animation in Japan for the American News Agency, according to the agency's objective of creating an animated film against communism.

In 1979, Payut created his first full-length animated film "The Adventure of Sudsakorn", which was based on the story of the poet Sunthon Phu and had a runtime of 82 minutes, consisting of 66,000 paintings. The film is widely considered a significant milestone in Thai animation history, and it was the first feature-length animated film produced in Thailand using traditional hand-drawn animation techniques. The film was a huge success, earning 2 million baht at the Athens Ratchathewi theater and making a significant impact on the Thai animation industry.

=== 1999–present ===
In 1999, Broadcast Thai Television adapted Thai literary works into 2D animated TV shows, such as "Pla Boo Thong", "Sang Thong", "Ngo Pa", and "Lok Nithan", which revitalized the Thai animation industry. Three years later in 2002, the Thai 3D animation industry saw the release of "PangPond The Future World Adventure", adapted from a comic, which marked a golden year for the industry. The animation first aired as an episodic series on Channel 3 in April before being edited into the feature film "PangPond The Animation" by Vithita Animation in October. Directed by Chaiporn Panichrutiwong, a rising star in the animation industry, the film was well-received and went on to become one of Thailand's leading animation franchises. It was also the first Thai animation to be shown in IMAX theaters.

In the same year, "King Vikram and Vetal The Vampire", directed by Suthep Tantirooj and Panuthep Sutthepthamrong and animated by Anya Animation studio, was the first Thai 3D computer-animated film. It premiered at the Hiroshima International Animation Festival in Japan in August 2002 before being shown in festivals in Thailand. Despite being the first of its kind in Thailand, it was not until later that it gained recognition as a significant milestone in Thai animation.

In 2007, Vithita Animation released the 2D animated series "Ramakien Mini Animation". Based on the Ramakien epic, the animated series was well-received and has continued to be a favorite among audiences, becoming a phenomenon for the animation industry in Thailand and leading to the sale of character rights for use in advertising and production of copyrighted products.

Other notable TV series animated during this era include "Shelldon", created by Shellhut Entertainment and directed by Jirayuth Chusanachoti with a budget of around 100 million baht. The series debuted in the Thailand Animation Festival in 2005 and later was broadcast on Channel 3 in 2008. It was shown in over 150 countries and its license was purchased in over 16 countries, leading to the creation of three seasons. Another series, "Paddle Pop Adventures", was created by The Monk Studios and was released in 2005, launching in over 33 countries.

Thai animation has come a long way since its early beginnings, and the industry has seen many significant milestones along the way. In 2006, Kantana Animation released the animated film "Khan Kluay", which was a turning point for the industry in terms of both budget and quality. The film, set in the Ayutthaya period, follows the adventures of Khan Kluay and captures the identity and symbols of Thailand. Directed by Kompin Kemgumnird, who has worked with renowned studios such as Walt Disney and Blue Sky Studios, "Khan Kluay" was a commercial success and became the highest-grossing film of the year in Thailand.

Kantana Animation started in 1987 as a subcontractor for Japan's Toei. In 1994, it produced its first Thai animated series, "Twin Witches". In addition to original productions, the company is also known for its outsourcing work, contributing to well-known works such as "Saint Seiya" and "Dragon Ball". Today, Kantana continues to offer outsourcing services to the Japanese animation industry.

2007 saw the release of the 2D computer-animated film "The Life of Buddha". The film, which recounts the story of Lord Buddha, was produced by Media Standard Company and directed by Kritsaman Wattananarong. The technical director, Wisanukorn Kongsomsak, had previously worked for Thai Wang Film Productions, which outsourced work for major studios such as Walt Disney and Warner Bros.

BeboydCG Studio, a subsidiary of True Corporation, and Sahamongkol Film collaborated on the animated film "Nak" which was released in 2008. The film uses both 2D image processing and 3D techniques to create characters and scenes and features the ghost character Mae Nak, based on the figure of the Thai female spirit who has a baby and can stretch her arms. The film was a hit and received praise for its cute and fun story that also conveyed moral themes.

The success of "Khan Kluay" led to the creation of its sequel, "Khan Kluay 2", which was released in 2009. In 2012, Kantana Animation released its third animated film, "Echo Planet", a 90-minute 3D stereoscopic film. Despite a large investment of 170 million baht, the film only earned 17 million baht domestically.

In October 2012, the 3D animated film "Yak: The Giant King" was released. The film, a joint venture worth over 100 million baht by Sahamongkol Film and Ittirit House, was directed by Prapas Cholsaranon and produced by Workpoint Pictures. The film took nearly 6 years and a team of 30 people to create, showcasing the dedication and talent of the Thai animation industry.

With a budget of 230 million baht, "The Legend of Muay Thai: 9 Satra" is a 2018 animated film directed by Pongsa Kornsri, Nat Yoswatananont, and Gun Phansuwon. It was a collaboration between Igloo Studio, Exformat Films, and RiFF Studio, distributed by M Pictures. The film follows the story of a young boy named Ott, who becomes a Muay Thai warrior to save his village from the occupation of Ramthep Nakorn by Asura. Despite generating an impressive 20 million baht in earnings within just the first four days of its release and earning 100 million baht nationwide by the year of its release, it did not recoup its entire budget in the same year. Nevertheless, the film was released on Netflix, allowing it to reach a wider international audience. It is known for its animation, which sets a new standard and demonstrates the growth and development of Thai animation.

As of recently, there has been a new wave of independent animators who create and upload their animated content onto YouTube, such as Pasulol or Pasu Lorpensri, with an emphasis on satire and comedy on the life and traditions within Thai society.

== Studios ==
Studio	Founded	Notes
Alternate Studio	2008	
Anya Animation	2001	
Appreciate Entertainment	2001	
BeboydCG Studio	1997	Became a subsidiary of True Corporation in 2001.
Chardo Animation	2022	
CKA Chiang Mai	2005	Subsidiary of Creative Kingdoms Inc.
EEZ Studios	2016	
Igloo Studio	2007	
Imagimax Studio	1998	
Kantana Animation Studios	1987	Kantana Animation transformed into Kantana Animation Studios Co., Ltd., a subsidiary of Kantana Group, in 2007.
Kyoraku Pictures Thailand	2013	Subsidiary of Japanese Kyoraku Pictures
Lunchbox Studio	2008	
M2 Animation	1998	Subsidiary of Danish M2 Entertainment.
Muffin Animation	2003	
RiFF Studio	2009	
RSU Animation	2014	
Shellhut Entertainment	2007	Subsidiary of Shellhut Co., Ltd.
Studio Kun	2014	
Studio Porta	2014	
Teapot Studio	2007	
The Monk Studios	2006	
Thai Wang Film Productions	1989	Subsidiary of Taiwanese-American Wang Film Productions Co., Ltd.
Vithita Animation	2001	
Yggdrazil Group	2006	
Zurreal Studio	2005	

== Animations ==
=== Animation films ===
Year	Title	Director(s)	Studio	Technique	Notes
1979	The Adventure of Sudsakorn สุดสาคร	Payut Ngaokrachang	–	Traditional animation	First full-length animation film in Thailand.
2002	King Vikram and Vetal The Vampire อภินิหารนิทานเวตาล	Suthep Tantirooj; Panuthep Sutthepthamrong	Anya Animation	CG animation	First 3D computer-animated film in Thailand which was screened at foreign festivals before screening at festivals in Thailand.
2002	PangPond The Animation ปังปอนด์ ดิ แอนิเมชัน ตอน ตะลุยโลกอนาคต	Chaiporn Panichrutiwong	Vithita Animation	CG animation	First Thai animation to be shown in IMAX theaters.
2006	Khan Kluay ก้านกล้วย	Kompin Kemgumnird	Kantana Animation	CG animation	An Indian redubbed version Jumbo was released in 2008.
2007	The Life of Buddha พระพุทธเจ้า	Kritsaman Wattananarong	Media Standard Co., Ltd.	2D animation	
2008	Nak นาค	Natthaphong Ratanachoksirikul	Sahamongkol Film International	CG animation	
2009	Khan Kluay 2 ก้านกล้วย 2	Taweelap Srivuthivong	Kantana Animation	CG animation	An Indian redubbed version Jumbo 2: The Return of the Big Elephant was released in 2011.
2012	Echo Planet เอคโค่ จิ๋วก้องโลก	Kompin Keamkumned	Kantana Animation	CG animation	
2012	Yak: The Giant King ยักษ์	Prapas Cholsaranon	Workpoint Entertainment	CG animation	
2014	The Story of Mahajanaka พระมหาชนก	Kriangkrai Suparasahasrangsi; Thananchanok Suban Na Ayutthaya; Nop Thamwanich	Software Industry Promotion Agency (SIPA); Thai Animation and Computer Graphic Association (TACGA)	3D animation	
2015	Ananta: Light of Hope อนันตา:ศิลาพิชิตมาร	Walpha Phimhthong	Media Standard Co.Ltd	2D animation	
2015	Khun Tong Daeng: The Inspirations คุณทองแดง ดิ อินสไปเรชั่นส์	Nitipat Somsaman; Phanlop Sincharoen; Saksiri Koshpasharin	Dr.Head; Imagimax Studio; The Monk Studios; Workpoint Pictures	CG animation	
2018	The Legend of Muay Thai: 9 Satra; 9 ศาสตรา	Pongsa Kornsri; Nat Yoswatananont; Gun Phansuwon	Exformat Films; Igloo Studio; RiFF Studio	CG animation	
2018	Krut: The Himmaphan Warriors ครุฑ: มหายุทธ หิมพานต์	Chaiporn Panichrutiwong	Rangsit University; RSU Animation	CG animation	
2023	Mantra Warrior: The Legend of the Eight Moons นักรบมนตรา: ตำนานแปดดวงจันทร์	Veerapatra Jinanavin	RiFF Studio	CG animation	
TBA	Black Dust	–	Igloo Studio	CG animation	
TBA	Afterworld: กลับบ้าน	Matt Braly	The Monk Studios	CG animation	In active development. Seeking co-production and financing partners.

=== Animation series ===
Year	Title	Studio	Season(s)	Episode(s)	Technique	Notes
2002	PangPond The Future World Adventure ปังปอนด์ ดิ แอนิเมชั่น ตอน ตะลุยโลกอนาคต	Vithita Animation	1	10	3D animation	
2003–2014	PangPond The Series ปังปอนด์ เดอะซีรีส์	Vithita Animation	3	65	2D animation	
2004	PangPond The Insect World Adventure ปังปอนด์ ดิ แอดเวนเจอร์ ตอน ผจญโลกแมลง	Vithita Animation	1	8	3D animation	
2005	3 Kingdoms Super Fun; 3Kok Mahasanook สามก๊ก มหาสนุก	Vithita Animation	2	52	2D animation	
2005–2016	Paddle Pop Adventures แพดเดิลป๊อป	The Monk Studios	6	72	CG animation	
2006	PangPond The Himmapan Adventure ปังปอนด์ ดิ แอดเวนเจอร์ ตอน ตะลุยป่าหิมพานต์	Vithita Animation	1	8	3D animation	
2006	4 Angies โฟร์แองจี สี่สาวแสนซน	Anya Animation	3	56	3D animation	
2007	Ramakien Mini Animation รามเกียรติ์ มินิ แอนิเมชั่น	Vithita Animation	1	78	2D animation	
2008	4 Comrades; 4 สหายล่าไอเย็น	Vithita Animation	1	13	2D animation	
2008	Bubble Warriors	CKA Chiang Mai	1	?	CG animation	
2008	Shelldon เชลล์ดอน	Shellhut Entertainment	3	78	3D animation	
2008	The Salads เดอะสลัดแก๊งจอมป่วน	Igloo Studio	1	26	3D animation	
2008	Trio Bunnies	CKA Chiang Mai	1	?	CG animation	
2009	DoggaDoop ด๊อกกาดู๊ป	Homerun Entertainment	1	52	CG animation	
2009	Mahosod มโหสถ ปราชญ์น้อยคู่แผ่นดิน	Vithita Animation	1	26	2D animation	
2010	StarDog สตาร์ด๊อก	Broadcast Thai Animation	1	26	2D animation Byrdland	
2011	Byrdland Flying With Byrd เบิร์ดแลนด์ แดนมหัศจรรย์	Shellhut Entertainment	1	52	CG animation	
2011	Dino Master ไดโน มาสเตอร์ ศึกเกมส์การ์ด อสูรล้านปี	Appreciate Entertainment	1	52	3D animation	
2011	Kobutra The Legend of Sun's Son โคบุตร ตำนานบุตรสุริยะ	Vithita Animation	1	26	2D animation	Based on Sunthorn Phu's poem.
2011	Papa Panda: Disruptive Family ป๊ะป๋าแพนด้า ครอบครัวตัวป่วน	BeboydCG Studio	1	26	3D animation	
2012	Ryuji Five/D-5 Warriors ริวจิไฟว์	TIGA	1	26	2D/3D animation	
2011	Papa Panda: As You Grow, Don't Cheat ป๊ะป๋าแพนด้า โตไปไม่โกง	BeboydCG Studio	1	10	3D animation	
2014	Ayupan x Bloody Bunny	2Spot Studio; RiFF Studio	1	5	CG animation	
2014	Khoo Zaa คู่ซ่าท้าสำรวจ	Vithita Animation	1	13	2D animation	
2014	The Ultimate Power	Vithita Animation	1	26	3D animation	
2015	Bloody Bunny: The First Blood	2Spot Studio; RiFF Studio	1	15	CG animation	
2021	Mahanakhon Khanom Thai มหานครขนมไทย	Vithita Animation	1	6	2D animation	
2022–present	Sea of Love	The Monk Studios	1	15	Flash	
2023	My Daemon	Igloo Studio	TBA	TBA	2D animation	Collaboration between Netflix Japan, Hirotaka Adachi aka Otsuichi, and Igloo Studio

=== Short animation ===
Year	Title	Studio	Technique	Type	Notes
2008	Bloody Bunny	2Spot Studio	CG animation	Short film	
2011	Escape of the Gingerbread Man!!!	The Monk Studio	CG animation	Short film	
2014	Coca-Cola vs SF Cinema	The Monk Studio	CG animation	Commercial	
2014	Nine	The Monk Studio	CG animation	Short film	
2014	RADAR Preparing for Disasters with Mr. Radar พี่เรด้าร์เตือนภัย เตรียมพร้อมไว้เมื่อภัยมา	Vithita Animation	CG animation	Short film	
2015	Mahajanaka พระมหาชนก เพื่อผู้พิการทางสายตา	Vithita Animation	CG animation	Short film	
2015	May Who?	RiFF Studio	CG animation	Short film	
2016	Riku	Vithita Animation	3D animation	Commercial	
2017	Midnight Story	RiFF Studio	3D animation	Short film	
2020	Aomori no Kisetsu	Igloo Studio	CG animation	Commercial	
2020	Farmhouse ปิ๊งรักฉบับนายขนมปัง	Igloo Studio	CG animation	Commercial	
2020	KIDS SEE GHOST	Igloo Studio	CG animation	Music video	
2020	MV-ORBIT	Igloo Studio	CG animation	Music video	
2020	The Weather is Lovely	RiFF Studio	CG animation	Short film	
2021	A Town Where We Live วันแห่งฝันคืนแห่งแสง	Igloo Studio	CG animation	Short film	Created to commemorate the 60th anniversary of the Provincial Electricity Authority (PEA).
2021	Popmart Dimoo X JD: Joy Studio	Yggdrazil Group	3D animation	Commercial	
2021	The Golden Crow	Yggdrazil Group	3D animation	Short film	
2022	Nai Khumkrong	Vithita Animation	2D animation	Commercial	
2022	Mariam and Friend	The Monk Studio	CG animation	Short film	
2022	XRB Galaxy	The Monk Studio	3D animation	Game cinematic	

== Animators ==
- Payut Ngaokrachang
- Chaiporn Panichrutiwong
- Kompin Kemgumnird
- Pasulol
- Veerapatra Jinanavin

== See also ==
- Cinema of Thailand
- Anime
