= Runglawan Thonahongsa =

Thai actress

- รุ้งลาวัณย์ โทนะหงษา
- Born: May 30, 1979 (age 47); Nakhon Ratchasima, Thailand
- Other name: Rung (รุ้ง)
- Occupation: Actress
- Years active: 2004–present

Runglawan Thonahongsa (Thai: รุ้งลาวัณย์ โทนะหงษา) is a Thai movie and TV drama actress. She was born on 30 May 1979 in Nakhon Ratchasima (Khorat), She is a Faculty of Arts graduate from Suan Dusit Rajabhat University.

== Career ==
Runglawan became famous throughout Thailand when she played Nu Hin (หนูหิ่น), meaning Rock Rat, a figure of popular Thai comics which was brought to the screen in the 2006 Thai film "Nu Hin: The Movie" (หนูหิ่น เดอะ มูฟวี่). Runglawan received the Thailand National Film Association Award for her role in the movie, as well as two Bangkok Critics Association Awards.

Created in the early 1990s by Thai cartoonist Padung Kraisri, Nu Hin was a character previously well known by Thai audiences: a young and cheeky girl wearing a bob cut, dressed in the traditional daily outfit of rural Isan and speaking in the language of local females from lower-class background. The character's witty and down-to-earth ways and happy-go-lucky attitude lead to comical situations in her interactions with more sophisticated people while working as a housemaid in Bangkok.

Runglawan Thonahongsa is regularly involved in charity work.

=== Thai TV soap operas ===
- Ying Rak Toe, ยิ่งรักเธอ (2004) Channel 3
- Koo Ruk Plick Lock, คู่รักพลิกล็อค (2004) Channel 3, RS
- Khleun Rak Si Khram, คลื่นรักสีคราม (2005) Channel 5, Exact Co.
- 7 Mahatsachan, 7 มหัศจรรย์ (2006) Channel 7, Kantana Group
- Phleng Rak Rim Fan Khong, เพลงรักริมฝั่งโขง (2007) Channel 7 คำพอดี
- Klin Kaeo Klang Chai, กลิ่นแก้วกลางใจ (2007) Channel 3
- Siang Luang Siang Rak, เสี่ยงลวงเสี่ยงรัก (2008) Channel 7 Kantana Group
- Re Rai Luk Sao Pa, เรไรลูกสาวป่า (2008) Channel 7 คำพอดี
- Montra Haeng Rak, มนตราแห่งรัก (2008) Channel 7 Kantana Group
- Ban Ni Mi Rak, บ้านนี้มีรัก; “There is love in this house” (guest star 2008) Channel 9 Exact Co.
- Sap Pu Sa, สาปภูษา (2009) Channel 3
- Nat Kap Nat, นัดกับนัด (guest star 2009) Channel 9 Exact Co.
- Suai Saep Sing, สวย แสบ ซิ่ง (2009) Channel 7 DaraVDO
- Thepphabut Maya Thepthida Cham Laeng, เทพบุตรมายา เทพธิดาจำแลง (2010) Channel 7 Kantana Group
- Phu Kong Chao Sane, ผู้กองเจ้าเสน่ห์ (guest star 2011-2012) Channel 3 Scenario
- Chao Ying Long Yuk, เจ้าหญิงหลงยุค (2011) Channel 7 Mirabilis
- Rak Yu Hon Dai, รักอยู่หนใด (2011) Channel 7 Mirabilis
- Mue Prap Maha Hian, มือปราบมหาเฮี้ยน (2011) Channel 7 มงคลการละคร
- Phut Sao Chai Sane, ภูตสาวเจ้าเสน่ห์ (2012) Channel 3 ดีวัน ทีวี
- Pin Anong ปิ่นอนงค์ (2012) Channel 7 มุมใหม่
- Nen Cha, เณรจ๋า (2013) Channel 7 Zense Entertainment
- Yai Bun Kap Mothuem, ยัยบุญ กับ หมอทึ่ม (2013) Channel 3 BEC-TERO Entertainment, จันทร์ 25
- Khu Rak Phlik Lok, คู่รักพลิกล็อก (2013) Channel 7
- Dom Thong, โดมทอง (2013) Channel 7 ดีด้า วิดีโอ โปรดักชั่น
- Thon โทน (2013) Channel 7 นพพร โปรโมชั่น
- Wiman Maphrao, วิมานมะพร้าว (2013) Channel 7 Phodikham
- 7 Mongkut, 7 มงกุฎ (2014) Channel 7 มาสเตอร์พีซ เอ็นเทอร์เทนเม้นต์
- Chao Sao Sala Tan, เจ้าสาวสลาตัน (2014) Channel 7 Kantana Group
- Khun Na Chai Rak Re คุณชายรักเร่ (2014) Channel 3 BEC-TERO Entertainment, จันทร์ 25
- Susan Khon Pen, สุสานคนเป็น (2014) Channel 7 Kantana Group
- Phrao, พราว (2014) Channel 7 Phodikham (guest star)
- Lan Sao Niranam, หลานสาวนิรนาม (2014) Channel 7 59 ออนแอร์
- Saphai Sai Lap, สะใภ้สายลับ (2015) Channel 3 ควิซ แอนด์ เควส
- Like Mat Sang, ลิเกหมัดสั่ง (2015) Channel 8 มั่งมีศรีสุขโปรดักชั่น
- Rak Re รักเร่ (2015) Channel 7 ฮันนี่ แอนด์ เฟรนด์ เอ็นเทอร์เทนเม้นท
- Thayat Asun ทายาทอสูร (2015) Channel 3 D One TV
- Chan Thana Sam Cha, ฉันทนาสามช่า (2015) Channel 7 Phodikham
- Chao Sao Chaphokit, เจ้าสาวเฉพาะกิจ (2015) Channel 8
- See Mai Karn (2019), สี่ไม้คาน (2019) Channel 7 Mongkol Kan Lakorn
- You Are My Heartbeat (2022), จังหวะหัวใจนายสะอาด (2022) PPTV Act9
- Phuea Mae Phae Bo Dai (2023), เพื่อแม่แพ้บ่ได้ (2023) One 31
- Sapai Sai Strong (2023), สะใภ้สายสตรอง (2023) Ch.3
- Luerd Chao Phraya (2023), เลือดเจ้าพระยา (2023) Ch.3 Arlong Group

=== Movies ===
| Year | Title | Role | Observations |
|---|---|---|---|
| 2006 | Nu Hin: The Movie | Nu Hin | |
| 2007 | Kon Bai The Movie | Ying Rung Mani Siri | cameo appearance |
| 2007 | Sai Lap Chap Ban Lek | | |
| 2011 | Mo Mai Onlaweng | Nurse | |
| 2015 | Last Light of Ehean | Naramphong | |

== See also ==
- Thai comics
