= Supot Anawatkochakorn =

Thai comics artist (born 1972)

- Born: Supot Anawatkochakorn; May 11, 1972 (age 54); Bangkok, Thailand
- Known for: character design, illustration, comics
- Notable work: Apaimanee Saga

Supot Anawatkochakorn (Thai: สุพจน์ อนวัชกชกร, born May 11, 1972), also known under the pen name Supot A, is a Thai comics artist. He is best known for creating the fantasy comics Apaimanee Saga, published in NED Comics' magazine Boom from 2001 to 2006. Apaimanee Saga is the first Thai comic series published in Western countries, such as France under the title Apai Saga by Milan in 2007. It was also adapted in animation and video game.

== Profile ==
Supot Anawatkochakorn has a long established relation with NED Comics' magazine Boom where he published his first comic series named Search. If the first series remains unfinished, its second part named Search 2 was fully completed. Supot A faded from the comics field during a short period of time before launching his most famous series Apaimanee Saga in the magazine Boom under the license of Nation Edutainment Co.Ltd. in Thailand. Its plot was adapted from the Thai novel Phra Aphai Mani by poet Sunthorn Phu. The story takes liberties from the original novel, being adapted in the style of a fantasy adventure comic series and introducing original characters such as demons and monsters. In 2007, he began his current ongoing series, the next part of Apaimanee Saga called The Pirates Dawn, serialized in NED Comics' magazine Boom.

== Works ==
- Search
- Search 2
- Apaimanee Saga (2001–2006)
- Apaimanee Saga: The Pirates Dawn (2007-ongoing)
- Comics Step Vol. 1 (2014)
