= Apaimanee Saga =

Thai comic series by Supot A

- The third volumes of Apaimanee Saga, published in Thailand.

Publication information
- Publisher: (Thailand) NED Comics
- Format: comic books
- Genre: Action/adventureFantasy
- Publication date: 2001
- Main character(s): Apaimanee, Srisuwan

Creative team
- Created by: Supot A and Jilrin.K
- Written by: Supot A
- Artist: Supot A
- Inker: Jilrin K.

Apaimanee Saga (Thai: อภัยมณี ซาก้า; RTGS: Aphaimani Saka) is a Thai comic series written and illustrated by Supot A. penciller and Jirin K. Inker It was originally serialized in Thailand in NED Comics' magazine Boom. The story was adapted from the Thai epic poem Phra Aphai Mani by Sunthorn Phu, a legendary poet.

Apaimanee Saga is the first Thai comic that has been published in the French language.

== Publication history ==
The first series was published in weekly comics Boom in 2001 and published as trade paperback for 16 volume The Pirates Dawn a sequel and second part are published in 2007 and ran for 17 volumes. The third part, called Tales Of Two Brothers, was published for five volumes before Boom Magazine was cancelled in 2014 The series went on hiatus for a while until return as self published comics in 2020

== Summary ==
The story tells the adventure of the two princes Apaimanee and Srisuwan.

== Characters ==
Apaimanee (อภัยมณี)
The first heir of Rattana, he is the first son of Thao Srisutat and Pratumkesorn. He skilled in Pi. He was caged by the water devil and helped by the mermaid clan.
Srisuwan (ศรีสุวรรณ)
The second heir of Rattana, he is the second son of Thao Srisutat and Pratumkesorn. He skilled in Krabong which defeated Thao Utain.
Keawkatesara (แก้วเกษรา)
The princess of Romemajak, she is a lover of Srisuwan.

The second volume of Apaimanee Saga, published in France

Guardian Demon (ผีเสื้อสมุทร)
The queen of the water devil, she born from the soul of 500 virgin girls.
Sinsamoot (สินสมุทร)
The son of Apaimanee and Guardian Demon, he has immense power.
Mira (ไมร่า)
The mermaid leader of dolphins who brought Apaimanee escape Guardian Demon to Ko Kaew Pitsadan. She is a daughter of Uros, the king of the mermaid clan.

== See also ==
- Apaimanee Saga: The Pirates Dawn
- Thai comics
