= Noo Hin: The Movie =

- The Thai movie poster.
- Directed by: Komgrit Triwimol
- Screenplay by: Kongdej Jaturanrasamee
- Story by: Sirapak Paoboonkerd; Nonzee Nimibutr
- Based on: Noo Hin by Vithit Utsahajit and Padung Kraisri
- Produced by: Nonzee Nimibutr; Yod Sukwiwat
- Starring: Runglawan Thonahongsa; Thanyakan Thanakitthananon; Panisa Buacharoen; Adisorn Insee; Nahatai Lekbumrung
- Cinematography: Pramett Chankrasse; Sayombhu Mukdeeprom
- Edited by: Nonzee Nimibutr
- Music by: Chatchai Pongprapaphan; Kongdej Jaturanrasmee
- Distributed by: Sahamongkol Film International
- Release date: 1 June 2006
- Running time: 102 minutes
- Country: Thailand
- Languages: Thai; Lao
- Budget: 40 million baht
- Box office: 51.8 million baht

Noo Hin: The Movie (Thai: หนูหิ่น เดอะ มูฟวี่; RTGS: Nu Hin Doe Mupwi) is a 2006 comedy film based on a popular Thai comic book and graphic novel series about a plucky domestic worker from Isan who's working for an upper class family in Bangkok. It was directed by Komgrit Triwimol and co-produced by Nonzee Nimibutr with a screenplay by Kongdej Jaturanrasamee.

== Plot ==
Noo Hin is a young woman living in Ubon Ratchathani in Northeast Thailand, and as the story opens, she is hunting for something to eat, and she spots a lizard (an animated character), which she chases throughout the countryside, causing a stampede of water buffalo and disrupting a village fair.

Noo Hin, it seems, is a constant troublemaker in the village, which as is typical for Isan is poor, with few prospects for jobs or a productive rice crop. Because Noo Hin is essentially useless, she must be sent to Bangkok to earn money in a factory.

Her departure at the railway station is a cause for celebration. Even the village band turns out to add to festivities.

As she rides on the train, Noo Hin imagines getting a job in a glamorous factory, making trendy bags, T-shirts and shoes. Her fantasy is acted out in a musical song-and-dance number. But at the employment agency, all that's left is a job in a rat-trap factory, which is horrifying to Noo Hin.

But as luck has it, an attractive, tall and large-breasted young woman strides into the agency looking for a new maid, and Noo Hin gets the job.

The young woman's name is Milk (มิลค์), which Noo Hin thinks is funny as the Thai word for milk (นม) has the dual meaning for both milk and breasts.

Noo Hin has troubles adapting to the city right from the start. She has never used a seatbelt in a car before. She is given some insect spray to get rid of bugs in her room. Its odor is pleasing, so she sprays so much that she faints from the fumes.

She also can't understand why Milk and her older sister, Som-O (Pomelo), are so obsessed with their appearance. Som-O is especially concerned, and is constantly exercising, using a piece of equipment or a vibrating belt she hopes will melt away any fat that might be on her waistline. Noo Hin is further mystified by the behavior of urban women, who fight over items in sales bins at Siam Center and use whitening cream to make their underarms sparkle.

The house is bigger than the provincial government building back home, but the resourceful Noo Hin settles in, wearing dust-mops on her feet, a head-dress of feather dusters and twirling a broom as she whips things into shape during another song-and-dance number.

Noo Hin also has time for romance, meeting Tong, who she sees at the house next door, working in the garden. She strikes up a friendship with him and makes him her special som tam. She is disappointed to find out later, however, that he is actually the son of the home's owners, and not a gardener from Isan.

With the housework in order and the family happy, Noo Hin sets her sights on her next project – making Milk and Som-O famous. So Noo Hin secretly enters both the girls in a "super model" contest, an idea that Milk and Som-O are angry about at first, but their social-climbing mother soon warms up to it.

At the contest, the girls catch the eye of a French designer's assistant, much to the dismay of jealous supermodel Sonia. But the event is marred when Noo Hin catches a young man snapping mobile phone camera pictures of Milk in her dressing room. Noo Hin accuses the man, but he turns out to be the son of an influential member of society (a hi-so, in Thai slang), and the case is swept under the rug and Noo Hin forced to apologize.

Still, both Milk and Som-O are sought after by the French designer, and as the sisters are being driven to another modeling appointment, they are kidnapped and held in a love hotel. Noo Hin, meanwhile, is spirited away to a sweatshop factory where Isan women are forced to sew stuffed animals under the supervision of men in black to the beat of a DJ playing techno.

Eventually, Noo Hin is able to charm one of the guards (who turns out to be an Isan native) and mount a rescue of the enslaved factory workers, while neighbor Tong tracks down Milk's and Som-O's whereabouts. They make it to the modelling engagement in time, only to be confronted by supermodel Sonia, who it turns out was the mastermind of the kidnapping. She is further exposed in front of the fashion designer, when it is revealed that she wears silicone falsies.

Milk and Som-O are then chosen to be the lead models for a new line of clothes by the French designer, which it turn out, have been inspired by Noo Hin's indigenous wardrobe. They are to be flown to France for further assignments, and Noo Hin will go along with them, likely stirring up trouble wherever she goes.

== Cast ==
Characters from the film, compared to characters from the comic book. The characters are, front to back: Noo Hin, Som-O, Milk and Tong.

- Runglawan Thonahongsa as Noo Hin (RTGS: Nu Hin)
- Kochakorn Suppakarnkitjakul as Milk
- Panisa Buacharoen as Som-O
- Adisorn Insee as Tong
- Nahatai Lekbumrung as Sonia

== Origins ==
Created around 1994 by cartoonist Padung Kraisri, Noo Hin is a loyal, hard-working domestic worker from Ubon Ratchathani (where Padung Kraisri also hails from). The character first appeared in the Banlue Sarn company's monthly comic book Cartoon Maha Sanook. In 2004, Noo Hin was spun off into her own series of graphic novels (called "pocket book" in Thailand), Noo Hin Inter, a black-and-white publication that sells for 12 baht and the full-color Noo Hin in the City, which sells for 50 baht. They are published by Vithita Animation.

Noo Hin's name in her northeastern Thai dialect suggests a bad smell. She is short with a square face and flat nose – in complete contrast to her employer, Milk, who is tall, with a round face, pointed nose, and light skin, with a name that suggests whiteness and purity.

The humorous situations are usually slapstick in nature have mostly have to do with Noo Hin's ignorance of modern, urban life. But Noo Hin always prevails, thanks to her traditional, rural wisdom and resourcefulness. If she has a superpower, it's an ability to make a delicious som tam and wield her pungent fish sauce as a secret weapon.

In addition, both Milk and her older sister, Som-O (Pomelo), have exaggerated breasts, which is similar to characters in Japanese manga, but the Noo Hin comics are not pornographic nor do they contain violence or sexual innuendo.

Actresses Kochakorn Suppakarnkitjakul and Panisa Buacharoen, who portrayed Milk and Som-O, respectively, wore silicone falsies to boost up their breast sizes, but some fans of the comic complained that the character's breasts weren't prominent enough, compared to the characters in the comic.

== Reception ==
The movie was received poorly by audiences and critics in Thailand. Distributor Sahamongkol Film International hoped to earn 80 million baht. But after a strong opening weekend in which it earned 22 million baht, it left cinemas after earning just 51.8 million. The movie was budgeted at 40 million baht. This was despite the movie being based on a popular comic, having a director who had directed two hit films (Komgrit Triwimol who co-directed Fan Chan and his solo debut Dear Dakanda) and a well-known screenwriter (Kongdej Jaturanrasamee), and produced by an influential filmmaker, Nonzee Nimibutr. A lack of cohesion in the storytelling and inexperienced actors were cited as the main reasons for the disappointing results.

== Soundtrack ==
A soundtrack album of music from film was released by Sony BMG Music Entertainment (Thailand). It includes mor lam and pop songs sung by popular singer-actress Janet Kiew and composed for the film by Kongdej Jaturanrasamee, as well as tracks by the movie's leading actress Runglawan Thonahongsa and Tata Young.
