= Igloo Studio =

Animation studio in Bangkok, Thailand

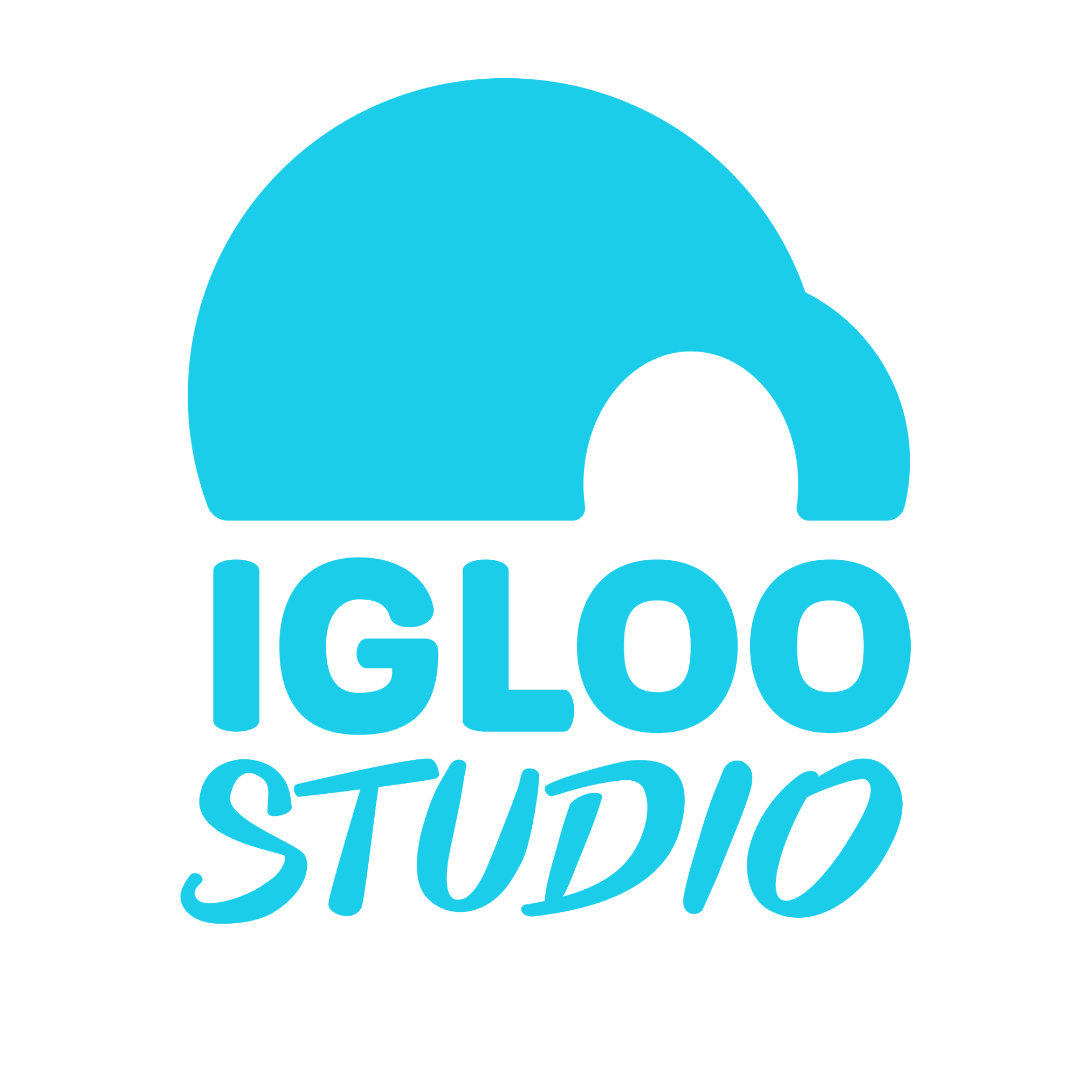
- Company type: Private
- Industry: Animation and production enterprise
- Founded: 6 August 2008; 17 years ago in Bangkok, Thailand
- Area served: Worldwide
- Key people: Nat Yoswatananont (CEO)
- Services: Story, Art, Pre-Production, Animation, Visual Effects, Mixed media
- Number of employees: 176 (as of February 2026)
- Website: www.igloostudio.com

Igloo Studio Co., Ltd. is an animation studio based in Bangkok, Thailand. The business was started in 2007 by Nat Yoswatananont (Thai: ณัฐ ยศวัฒนานนท์), who serves as its CEO, and was registered as a company in 2008. The studio became known in Thailand from the 2018 animated film The Legend of Muay Thai: 9 Satra, though it has also done a variety of work for various clients, mostly in advertising. Its advertising short films A Town Where We Live for the Provincial Electricity Authority and Aomori no Kisetsu for Malee juice brand, both released in 2020, drew attention for their anime style, with A Town Where We Live screened at several international festivals. It has also done work for international clients, and produced the 2023 series My Daemon for Netflix. In 2025, it produced animations for the video game Dispatch.

== See also ==
- Thai animation
