= Pakdee Saentaweesuk =

Thai cartoonist

Pakdee Santaweesuk
- Born: 13 October 1960 (age 64); Bangkok, Thailand
- Education: Rajamangala University of Technology
- Known for: Cartoonist, animator

Pakdee Santaweesuk or Tai Kai-Hua-Roh is a Thai cartoonist. He is a pioneer of Kai-Hua-Roh and Mahasanook cartoons. He is the first publisher of the cartoon named PangPond.

== Early life ==
Santaweesuk was born on October 13, 1960, in Bangkok. He earned his High Vocational Certificate from Rajamangala University of Technology Phranakhon in advertising in 1979.

While Pakdee was studying in the second year of Vocational Certificate, he offered a drawing to Vithit Utsahajit, the editor Ban-Lue-Sarn Publisher. He was accepted as a cartoonist of Mahasanook and Kai-Hua-Roh in 1979. Pakdee drew a picture story in Lai-Rot magazine, which was owned by Banluesarn.

== Career ==
After he graduated, he worked with an advertising company while drawing cartoon for Mahasanook and Kai-Hua-Roh. In 1983 Vithit asked him to work as a full-time editor-assistant.

Pakdee drew a boy with three hairs named Pangpond for the first time on Mahasanook in 1989. The response was enthusiastic; 12 years later, Pangpond appeared in an anime and was on-air via Channel 3 MCOT.

== Personal life ==
Pakdee married Udomporn Santaweesuk (or Koong). He had two children, Pattarakorn Santaweesuk (Pangpond), and Samathi Santaweesuk (Ninja). His child's name was used as a character in Ai-Tua-Lek (Thai: ไอ้ตัวเล็ก), his most popular short cartoon. In 2010, Rajamangala University of Technology Phranakhon offered Pakdee an honorary degree in multimedia technology.

== Work ==
- ไอ้ตัวเล็ก is a well-known cartoon of that later became PangPond
- Cockroach Man is an imitative cartoon based on Mosquito Man a movie in which the main character is a cockroach man
- Duen Khrung Duang is the first cartoon that Noppol Komarachun(link) and Saantaweesuk wrote. They use a celebrity/model as a main character to write a story.
- Two comrades is a short cartoon about two friends, “Tai” and “Nhong”.
- The Editor is a cartoon in which “Awitid”(Vithit Utsahajit) is a main character.
- Graphic novel Lhai-Rod
- A cover page of Kai Hua Roh

=== Pangpond ===
Pangpond is a cartoon series by Saantaweesuk, originally called Ai-Tua-Lek. It was first published in Ma-ha-sa-nuk magazine by Ban-Lue-Sarn in 1989. Pangpond is the main character. He is a 5 year-old with only three hairs. His character was humorous, optimistic and a trouble maker.
