= Garin's Uncanny File =

- The first comic volumes of Garin's uncanny file published in Malaysia.

Publication information
- Publisher: Punica (Thailand)
- Format: comic, novel
- Genre: Dark fantasy
- Publication date: July 2008
- Main character(s): Garin, Lultima

Creative team
- Written by: Aii
- Artist(s): Black Tohfu

Garin's Uncanny File (Thai: การิน ปริศนาคดีอาถรรพ์; RTGS: Karin Pritsana Khadi Athan; lit. 'Garin’s mystery case puzzle') is a Thai horror fantasy comic series written by Aii and illustrated by Black Tohfu . It was originally serialized in Thailand by Punica Publishing.

The series is first debut as novel in 2008 before published as comic book from in a same year and met a success with readers in Thailand before extent in to another country Garin's Uncanny File phenomenon created within one month of sales released and published in Malaysia as FaIL aNEH GaRIN

Garin's Uncanny File has three versions: novel, comic, and BlaCX. There is also a live-action film adaption called Garin X Guardian released in theaters in 2015.

In 2024 the series will come to conclusion with case 16 (กลอุบัติมิคสัญญี) in both Novel and Comics from

== Summary ==
Lultima is a girl with an extraordinary ability. Because of it evil things keep coming to her. She also can read people's minds. She tries to escape from them all the time. After transferring to a new school she met a boy named Garin, who's fond of black magic. Then there was an accident with a student in her class, which Lultima sensed it might be because of Garin when she confront him it may lead them to journey through a dark destiny

== Spin-off ==
There are many spin-offs from the Garin series like Chiean (เชียร) That focus on an immortal magician antagonist of Garin expand into a novel(เชียร พันธนาอัตตานิรันดร์) and web comics series(เชียร ภาคีฑัณฐ์ อาถรรพ์) and Garin's Blacx a stand-alone collection of short stories that published in Blacx Magazine or Wongkot (วงกต เรื่องเฮี้ยนหลังห้อง) that set in the same universe and Garin Junoir a knowledge comic that aim for kids

== Reception ==
Garin's Uncanny File is the best selling book of both Thailand and Malaysia. And now has plan to sign a contract to purchase in many countries. Also South Korea that be next country. with the success of garin it will help punica launch Blacx the anthology comics magazine in 2011 and expand many series and spin off later
