= Apaimanee Saga: The Pirates Dawn =

Publication information
- Publisher: (Thailand) NED Comics
- Format: comic books
- Genre: Action/adventureFantasy
- Publication date: 2007
- Main character(s): Suwanmalee, Sinsamoot

Creative team
- Created by: Supot A.
- Written by: Supot A.
- Artist: Supot A.

Apaimanee Saga: The Pirates Dawn (Thai: อภัยมณี ซาก้า: รุ่งอรุณแห่งโจรสลัด; RTGS: Aphaimani Saka: Rung Arun Haeng Chon Salat) is a Thai comic series written and illustrated by Supot A. It was originally serialized in Thailand in NED Comics' magazine Boom.

A sequel of Apaimanee Saga,

== Characters ==
Apaimanee (อภัยมณี)
The first heir of Rattana, he is the first son of Thao Srisutat and Pratumkesorn. He skilled in Pi. He was caged by the water devil and helped by mermaid clan.
Srisuwan (ศรีสุวรรณ)
The second heir of Rattana, he is the second son of Thao Srisutat and Pratumkesorn. He skilled in Krabong which defeated Thao Utain.
Keawkatesara (แก้วเกษรา)
The princess of Romemajak, she is a lover of Srisuwan.
Sinsamoot (สินสมุทร)
The son of Apaimanee and Guardian Demon, he has immense power.
Mira (ไมร่า)
The mermaid leader of dolphins who brought Apaimanee escape Guardian Demon to Ko Kaew Pitsadan. She is a daughter of Uros, the king of mermaid clan.

== See also ==
- Apaimanee Saga
