= My Daemon =

2023 animated television series

- Promotional poster
- Genre: Fantasy; Science fiction
- Written by: Hirotaka Adachi
- Directed by: Nat Yoswatananont
- Voices of: Miyuri Shimabukuro; Kokoro Kikuchi
- Music by: Pantawit Kiangsiri
- Countries of origin: Thailand; Japan
- Original language: Japanese
- No. of episodes: 13

Production
- Executive producer: Taiki Sakurai
- Running time: 23–31 minutes
- Production company: Igloo Studio

Original release
- Network: Netflix
- Release: November 23, 2023

My Daemon is an anime-influenced fantasy-science fiction television series, produced by Thailand-based Igloo Studio for Netflix. Directed by Nat Yoswatananont, the series was released on November 23, 2023.

== Premise ==
In the near future, after a nuclear explosion has caused the Earth to collide with Hell, elementary student Kento finds a small daemon creature he names Anna, and raises her. The series follows the adventures of Kento and Anna as they embark on a journey to bring his mother back to life.

== Characters ==
=== Main characters ===
- Kento Tachibana (voiced by Miyuri Shimabukuro in Japanese and Cassandra Lee Morris in English) is a young elementary student, and main protagonist, who finds Anna and raises her.
- Anna (voiced by Kokoro Kikuchi in Japanese and Cristina Vee in English) is a small demon creature who was found by Kento after wandering aimlessly in the forest.

=== Other characters ===
- Kaoru Tachibana (voiced by Fumiko Orikasa in Japanese and Amber Lee Connors in English)
- Kaede Houjou (voiced by Ayane Sakura in Japanese and Ryan Bartley in English)
- Kouya Kokonoe (voiced by Wataru Hatano in Japanese and Robbie Daymond in English)
- Kiriko Nanbu (voiced by Naoya Miyase in Japanese and Benjamin Diskin in English)
- Genjiro Houjou (voiced by Jouji Nakata in Japanese and Bill Butts in English)

== Episodes ==
No.	Title	Original release date
1	"The Grave Journey"	November 23, 2023
Young Kento starts raising a tiny daemon Anna with remarkable powers . But everyone is not kind to his new companion.
2	"A Tough Decision"	November 23, 2023
Kento and Anna arrive in a vibrant truck stop town in Shizuoka. But they have trouble finding a place to stay.
3	"Friend or Foe"	November 23, 2023
Kento and Anna arrive in a vibrant truck stop town in Shizuoka. But they have trouble finding a place to stay.
4	"Corrupted Soul"	November 23, 2023
Kento steps up to help when he learns that the child is trapped after being attacked at the shopping center.
5	"The Collector"	November 23, 2023
While Kento and Kaede travel through Nagoya, an aircraft crash-lands nearby, and a giant, spider-like daemon suddenly begins rampaging the area. Kaede is also revealed as a transgender female.
6	"Awakening"	November 23, 2023
Anna suddenly undergoes a transformation while trying to save Kento from the spider daemon. Kaede calls her friend at the Peace Organization.
7	"Impurity of Peace"	November 23, 2023
In Osaka, Kento and Kaede begs to Ichinose to help them get Anna back, But entering into Organization headquarters won't be easy.
8	"Separated"	November 23, 2023
Kaede, Ichinose and Kento works to rescue Anna, But Kaede and her grandfather have a difference of opinion.
9	"The Little Friendship"	November 23, 2023
Kento & Anna were finally together again, with little help from little daemons, he managed to collected coins for the train tickets as to continue to his journey.
10	"Strong-willed"	November 23, 2023
Kento gets a train ticket to Hakata with help from Anna's friends. But the Peace Organization picks up his scent.
11	"For All Departed Souls"	November 23, 2023
Kaede, a transgender female, finds Kento and, alarmed by his living situation, tries to get him to leave with her. But first, she has to deal with his mother.
12	"The Judgement"	November 23, 2023
Kaede finds Kento and, alarmed by his living situation, tries to get him to leave with her. But first, she has to deal with his mother.
13	"At All Cost"	November 23, 2023
As everyone evacuates to escape the rampaging Restoration Daemon, Kento walks back to Hakata to speak to Kiriko directly.

== Production ==
The series was announced during Netflix's virtual Tudum event in September 2022, with Hirotaka Adachi (also known as Otsuichi) penning the scripts and Nat Yoswatananont as director. Thai animation company Igloo Studio handled production.

== Release ==
My Daemon was released worldwide in November 2023 on Netflix.
