= EXEcutional =

Thai comic series

- Characters from EXEcutional.

Publication information
- Publisher: CartoonThai Studio (Siam Inter Comics)
- Format: Manga
- Genre: Action/Adventure/Science Fiction
- Publication date: July 17, 2005 - July 18, 2022 (complete)
- No. of issues: 50

Creative team
- Created by: Panuwut Wattanukul

EXEcutional (Thai: เอ็กซีคิวชั่นแนล มหาสงครามออนไลน์ถล่มจักรวาล; RTGS: Eksikhiochannaen Maha Songkhram Onlai Thalom Chakkrawan; lit. 'Executional: Online’s great war, attack the universe') is a Thai comic written and illustratated by Panuwat Wattananukul (Thai: ภานุวัฒน์ วัฒนนุกูล). The comic is serialized in the magazine that Licence from Shueisha Weekly Shōnen Jump name C-Kids Magazine (Siam Inter Comics) in 2005 When C-kids ceased publication in 2016 the comics is continued as a trade paperback until ending on Vol. 50 in 2022

== Introduction ==
The neo universe is the most popular MMO RPG right now, in which players get a great gaming experience with technology that can take their minds into the game with headphones that will Releasing soft electrical waves Which is guaranteed by many leading companies

The story focuses on the war between the game-masters (GM) group and the anti-game-masters group, to which Ganda, a boy protagonist belongs. The story also touches on how Ganda and his friends are doing and their relationship in the real world. Unlike other online games in which players are separated into different servers, Neo-Universe keeps all 7,000,000 players in one server. In the game, there are four planets on which the players live:

- Laputa: The planet on which Ganda and his friends; the story takes place primarily here
- Vertex: A mysterious planet, full of monsters and dangers
- Reticulum: The planet with the largest trading and marketing area
- Muera: The planet with abundant ores, and with more-advanced technology compared with the other planets

== Plot ==
Ganda, a young secondary-school teenage, who got a popular Neo Universe game from his brother, Vissana. Having participated in the game, hoping to become a GM like his brother. However, Ganda was tricked by an Anti-GM member named Waipoj, and became one of the Anti-GM members. He learned later that the Anti-GMs were not evil as he thought. The real evil were the rebellious GM members (which his brother are part of) who betraying and destroying they former group and use they power as they own free will. Since they could kill any player for their own purposes. The Anti-GM group was the only group brave enough to challenge them, and it became an army with the addition of allies.

Ganda, now assigned as Captain of 1st Anti-GM army division, have been adventuring in this VR world, doing the assigned missions, making new friends in the game, leading into become part of a war between two faction.

== Characters ==
=== Anti-GM Army members ===
Ganda

- Age: 18
- Class/Occupation: Randomizer/High-school student
- ESP Hyper-reaction: Due to his ESP Ganda has greater flexibility than most players, which means he can dodge dangers quicker than they. However, it is unrelated to his speed parameter. Therefore, Ganda is not faster than normal players with the same speed status; he just has a quicker response.
- First appearance: Chapter one

Ganda is the protagonist of EXEcutional. His initial goal was to become a Game Master like his elder brother Vissana (Thai: วิศนะ), but a bizarre encounter with Waipoj makes him leader of the first division of the anti-GM faction. He is energetic, optimistic and full of willpower, making him a likeable figure within the anti-GM army. Throughout his time as commander Ganda has shown great skill in battle (which he owes to his class ability), and has gained the respect of other members of the army. In the real world Ganda studies at Passorn's school, and is in his second year of high school. He lives alone, with his brother absent most of the time. Behind his house is a haunted banana forest, and Ganda had several comical encounters with ghosts when other characters are sleeping over.

- Skills: His ability as a Randomizer grants him the power to summon weapons, spells and items at random. These summonses can range from powerful to useless, or damaging to the user. As Ganda climbs the levels he gains new abilities, which allow him to use more than weapons. His abilities also stabilize, becoming less random:
- Miracle Treasure Box: Ganda's default skill, he summons a treasure box to obtain random weapons.
- Star Treasure Box: Ganda summons a Star Treasure box: a slot machine, which he plays to randomly receive status bonuses or penalties (for example, a free speed boost a poisoning).
- Rainbow Treasure Box: Ganda summons a Rainbow Treasure box, in which he has to match cards within a time limit. Depending on the pairs he gets, Ganda can cast a variety of spells.

The name "Ganda" literally means "beautiful young lady", and is supposed to be a girl's name; the author may have chosen this name ironically.

Passorn

- Age: 17
- Job (In game/Real life): First job: ranger; second job; guardian/High-school student (Ganda's classmate)
- First appearance: Beginning of volume one

Passorn is a cheerful, lively girl, a member of the first unit. She is Ganda's assistant when he joins the army, and uses a long gun skillfully. In the real world, she is a shy girl who is in love with Ganda. She never shows her feelings; she blushes when Ganda is around, and all she can do is look at Ganda from behind him in the classroom. The picture in the infobox shows Passorn above in the game and below in the real world.

Waipoj

- Age: 18
- Job (in game/real-world): Biologist/College student
- First appearance: Beginning of volume one

A wily boy, who lured Ganda to become the first-division captain of the anti-GM army. He is creative, full of strange ideas but good nevertheless. His skill is genetic engineering, creating a new monster to support him in battle by mixing genes from other monsters. He has many monster cards, and when he throws out some of his cards the monsters on the card undergo a fusion reaction to become a new monster (for example, an evil eye, turtle shell, and iron dumbbell become an iron evil eye). After defeating Ghost Master (chief monster in the Winchester house dungeon), he returns to the anti-GM army.

Monsters

- "Rolling Hawkeye": a massive mace-liked ball.
- "Slime Bunker": a well-protected slime wall.
- "Ultra Rolling": a huge size of Rolling Hawkeye.
- "Crab Destroyer": a miniguns pincers crab
- "Royal Queen Lotus Smasher": an enormous sharptooth lotus.
- "Aiming Flower": an eagle-eyed flower.
- "Dragon Vine": a giant dragon-faced vine.
- "Calamity Hand": a metal hand enforced with powerful laser beam.
- "Varient Tank": a new version of Boss Varient, containing guns and missile.

Wiriya

- Age: 14
- Job (in game/real-world): General/Secondary-school student
- First appearance: Beginning of volume one

A muscled rabbit, who also is in the first unit. What everyone does not know is that Mr. Rabbit is really a woman; she is the army's advisor. She seems to like Ganda; whenever she meets him, she greets him with a tight hug. When she improves her class, her name changes to Hero. She uses a spear (a rare item) skillfully, and is a secondary-school student like Kasem, Nanthagorn and Majsha. She is close friends with Majsha (the chief), both in the real world and in the game, but she seems to also owe Majsha something.

Assada

- Age: 19
- Job (in game/real-world): First job: Berserker; second job: Highlander/College Student
- First appearance: End of volume one

Assada is the captain of the second division. He is quiet, and his face does not show much emotion; according to Passorn, he is very shy. His forté are sword tricks. Because of his great battle ability he is respected by everyone in the army (especially his vice-captain, Kasem). Assada was defeated in a conflict with a GM; after a temporary withdrawal from the anti-GMs and a training stint in the Winchester Maze Dungeon, he returns during the Winchester War and defeated a GM.

Kasem

- Age: 14
- Job (in game/real-world): Fighter/Secondary-school student
- First appearance: End of volume one

Assada's vice-captain despite his childishness and hot temper, Kasem is a member of the second unit whose skill is bare-knuckle fighting. Invited to join the army by Assada, Kasem once said that he entered the army because he wanted to live near a person he liked. He is possibly bisexual, always seen near Assada wherever he goes. He is also fond of Passorn, however, although he knows she loves Ganda. In the real world, Kasem is very short (148 cm—four feet eleven inches tall). He attends school with Majsha, Nanthagorn and Wiriya.

Majsha

- Age: 14
- Job (In game/Real-life): Key Master/Middle-school student
- ESP genius: There have been only a few true geniuses, and Majsha is not one of them. However, she is superior to girls her age and to most adults.
- First appearance: Beginning of volume three

Leader of the anti-GM army despite her young age, Majsha is their smartest and strongest member. She is a gifted strategist, and an exceptional leader. Her name means "fish" in Thai. In the first few chapters of the comic, she does not show her face when communicating with the other members; instead, the picture of a goldfish is used as her avatar. In the real world Majsha studies with Wiriya, Nanthagorn and Kasem, and declares her love for Ganda. As one of the twelve Key Masters, her event-horizon weapon is the Justice Ray.

Nanthagorn

- Age: 14
- Job (In game/Real-life): Monster/Middle-school student
- First appearance: Episode seven

Appearing to Ganda as a duck, Nanthagorn says he is a monster controlled by a player but in reality he can change from human to duck at will. He does not get along with Ganda, and competes with him in the army. In real life he studies with Kasem and Wiriya (whom he calls "Fried tofu"). Wiriya does not like Nanthagorn because she knows that he likes her best friend, Majsha. Kasem is his best friend.

- Skills: He use bazooka (or cannon), bombs and wooden signs (for communicating with others and melee fighting) as his weapon.
- Soul Steal: he can steal monster souls, which make him able to use owner soul's abilities.
- Transform: he can transform himself into duck form, that have more stamina. And human form, that more speed.

=== Game Master (GM) ===
Neo Universe differs from other massively multiplayer online role-playing games (MMORPGs) in what a GM can or cannot do. GMs of Neo Universe can do whatever they please, as long as it does not violate the rules. As a result, GMs can abuse their power for their benefit.

Ruler of the World

The Ruler of the World is a program that keeps Neo Universe running; the "Creator" left instructions.

Lettuce

Lettuce is a GM with long blond hair who wears a coat and specializes in using fields created from his weapon. Lettuce fought and killed Assada the first time they met; however, Ganda killed him in the Winchester War. His weapon is the Force of the Century, a device similar to a Nintendo Famicom. Lettuce inserts cartridges into his Force of the Century, creating fields corresponding to each cartridge from which he will gain abilities. For example, the Bomber Cartridge creates a Bomberman-like maze, and Lettuce can use bombs to attack his opponent. These fields can stack; as the battle continues, Lettuce becomes stronger. His strongest weapon can inflict damage valued at 24,000 (24 K). When Lettuce uses his skills, the pupils of his eyes become invisible.

Onion

Onion always wears a cap and eye scope; his weapon is called the Violence Killer. There are two weapons in a set: a flashlight and chopsticks. His flashlight (unlike an ordinary flashlight) produces a dark light to blind his enemies and while his opponent cannot see, Onion will destroy his opponent's weapon with the chopsticks.

Tomato

Tomato is bald, and wears two pairs of glasses: one on his eyes and one on his forehead. He is sadistic, and likes to kill people in the game; he enjoys seeing his opponent's blood and hearing them scream. His weapon, Chainsaw Massacre, is a three-bladed chainsaw. When Tomato takes off his glasses, he becomes more powerful. His death-blow is a power wave with gravity force; opponents cannot evade it unless they have a high-speed move or warp skill.

Lemon

Lemon is an old man with glasses. He is a skilled inventor in the GM group and invented the GMs' transportation, the spaceship Nexus. Lemon always carries a backpack filled with construction blueprints.

Pumpkin

Pumpkin is tricky and full of guile, a classmate of Assada in the real world. In the game, he likes to fool the opponents into thinking they are all on the same side. When the opponent's defenses are down, he moves in. His weapon is Raging Pain (a whip). Pumpkin's appearance and personality are similar to Ichimaru Gin in Bleach.

Carrot

Carrot specializes in magic and is an expert on star magic, which is the rarest and most powerful kind of magic. His older sister is married to Holy Order in the real world. His weapon, Star Bridge, prevents Carrot's spells from being canceled. All damage received during casting, and the knock-back effects from attacks received, will be nullified. His skill is with the Quazar, which sends opponents to the center of the universe where they are killed; since their bodies are far away, it is difficult to resurrect them.

Broccoli

Broccoli is a GM who looks like a boy wearing a lion costume. He acts like a young boy, showing emotion directly, wanting someone to cheer or comfort him and talking a lot. He encountered Majsha in the pass and was almost defeated by her, resulting in his fear of the Justice Ray. His weapon is Spartan X: a small knife whose attack power varies according to how much force Broccoli puts into it.

Holy Order

The master GM, Holy Order appears as a middle-aged man with short blond hair. He seems to enjoy mentally dueling with Majsha. He is relaxed, but can turn serious when needed. His weapon is the Creature Master, which has a touch screen, clam-shell design and a stylus. Holy Order has no offensive skills, only has support ones used through Creature Master (by drawing skill-signs on its screen). His skills include Sacrifice Vision (a risky healing skill) and Chain Vision (which joins attacks).

=== Other characters ===
Mint

- First appearance: Middle of volume three

Mint's job is a monster dealer, being able to buy items from monsters; the items she gets from monsters are always cheaper than market price (and sometimes rare). She is skilled at fast calculations, and becomes a successful investor; she and Ganda invest in the Eric Herb Company. Mint was tricked into joining the GM force after the Winchester War with her code name, GM Mint, and was defeated by Majsha.

Eric Herb Company

- First Appearance: Middle of volume three

Eric Herb Company sells herbs which can increase life points or battle ability. The company's owner is Kan, a sharp-tongued businesswoman accompanied by three boys her age: Kitti (an angry-faced farmer), Ei (a cocky-faced plant researcher) and Samart (a sleepy-faced surveyor).

Browser

- First appearance: Beginning of the story

A bully, who likes to tease weaker players; his first (and last) appearance is in chapter one, where Ganda and Waipoj teach him a lesson.

Merchant Committee and Barbarian Group

- First Appearance: Middle of volume one

The leader of the merchant committee is an intimidating man, approximately 5 metres (16 ft) tall and accompanied by two similar-looking characters. His skills are "Shop remote" (a skill forcing a weaker player to buy him a common item at a high price) and "Shop remote arrange" (forcing a weaker player to sell him their own (possibly rare) item for a low price. His deathblow is "Shop fusion" (making a battle tank with an accomplice).

The Barbarian Group is another belligerent group of merchants appearing in volume one. They have a conflict with the merchant committee, which is invading their trading area. They fight and, with the help of Ganda and his friend, win the battle and get their area back.
