= Vithit Utsahajit =

Thai cartoonist

- Born: Bangkok, Thailand

Vithit Utsahajit is the man who established the Kai-Hua-Roh comic, Mahasanook comic, and is a director of Pee Hua Kard: The Movie. He is also the first pioneer to create a 3D animated film in Thailand. People gave him the nickname "The King of Thai Cartoons". At present, the Bunluesarn's fans know him as "Editor Withit".

== Biography ==
Vithit Utsahajit is the son of Bunlue Utsahajit, the owner and establisher of Bunluesarn Group. He is the first son of the entire family. He graduated secondary school from Chulanak Girl School and later he moved to Rajamangala University of Technology Phanakhon. On this period, Withit has a chance to learn and take an internship in movie field. After that, he decided to continue studying at London Film School and received Diploma of Higher Education (DipHE). Right after he graduated from the university, he continued the business of his dad.

== Vithit and Cartoon in Banluesarn group ==
Vithit had a lot of predilection in cartoon work as he was familiar with his dad's printing house since he was young. Until 1973, when he was 18 years old, he started to draw his first three panel cartoon named “Kai-Hua-Roh”; seeing a chance as these types of cartoon were not popular in the market, and believes that Kai-Hua-Roh will be sellable.

When Kai-Hua-Roh became successful, he published another cartoon in the same category as Kai-Hua-Roh named Mahasanook two years after. Both two comics was very popular til today. Lately, he then published a mini series cartoon of the famous writer in Banluesarn Group, such as Pangpond, Noo Hin Inter, etc.

In 2011, Banluesarn group released Kai-Hua-Roh application for E-magazine download which is usable with tablet, IOS smartphone, and android.

== Personal life ==
Vithit married Chotika or Nok and had five children, three daughters and two sons “the last three are triplets”

- Pimpicha Utsahajit “New”
- Padare Utsahajit “Now”
- Phimadade Utsahajit “Name”
- Phimtouch Utasahajit “Nope”
- Phimnida Utasahajit “Natty”

== Contribution ==
A director of a movie “Pee Hua Kard” in 1978 and contribute in about 20 movies

- “Kai Hua Roh” (since 1973, every two weeks in early years, now a weekly comic book)
- “Maha Sanook” (weekly comic book since 1975)
- “A flower girl and Kluay Khai boy” by Arifen Hazanee (monthly comic book)
- “Noo Hin Inter” (monthly comic book) by Padung Kaisri
- “PangPond” (monthly comic book)
- “PangPond” (TV cartoon) on Channel 3 (Thailand). Sign a signal contact with CCTV a television station in China for a cartoon “PangPond” to On-Air there
- “Sam-kok” (TV cartoon) on Channel 7 (Thailand)
- “Kai Hua Roh Happlication”
- “Edu’toon” (Education Cartoon)
- “Knowledge Cartoon such as Cockroach Hero which tell about cockroach in a cute way, also a life of panda in “Panda Maha Sanook”

== Award ==
- 3rd SMEs National Award 2010 “Creativity and Design”
- TAM “Thai Animation Multimedia” awards 2007 “Pung-Pon Animation won a First Consolation Prize in Best Animation in category of “Long-Form” section
- TAM “Thailand Animation Multimedia” awards 2007 “Ramakian Animation won a Second Consolation Prize in category of “Long-Form” section
- TAM award 2006 “Sam-Kok Maha Sanook won a Best Animation for Television in 2D animated movie
- 2nd TAM Contest “Short Animation on “Chang”
- The Prime Minister TAM Award 2005 “Best Animation For Television Series in 3D Animated Movie “Pung-Pon” in category of “Long-Form” and 3D Animated Movie “Conform Khun *See Chood Mun” in category of Short Form
- TAM Award 2006 “Best Website Design”
- Finalist Asia Image Apollo Awards 2005 “Best 3D Animation For a TVC “Cloth World Version Doctor”
- Finalist AsiaImage Apollo Awards 2005 “Best 3D Animation For a TVC “Cloth World Version Mom”
- 2nd TAM Award 2005 “Best Animation TV Series in 3D Animated Movie “Pung-Pon Animation”
- 2nd TAM Award 2005 “Best Animation TV Series in 3D Animated Movie “Conform Doctor”
- 3rd TAM Award 2005 Best “Animated For Television in 2D Animated Movie “Freedom Frog”
- 2nd TAM Award 2005 “From Contest of Short Animation of Music Video “Yah-lhork-wa-rak”
- Bangkok International ICT Expo 2004 “Remarkable Logo Design”
- B.A.D Award 2003 “Best Art Direction”
- Award for Outstanding Comic for youth 2003 from “Department of Cultural Promotion”
- Pung-Pon awarded to be Friends of Young Ambassador of Virture from 2003–present from Bureau of International Cooperation Ministry of Education Thailand
- Award for Outstanding Benefit for the youth from Social Development and Security office
