= The Legend of Muay Thai: 9 Satra =

- Thai theatrical release poster
- Directed by: Pongsa Kornsri; Nat Yoswatananont; Gun Phansuwon
- Screenplay by: Nat Yoswatananont; Bryan Edward Hill; Daraka Wongsiri
- Story by: Nat Yoswatananont; Supaporn Riensuwan
- Produced by: Sirot Setabandhu; Apisek Wongvasu; Phusanut Kharunwongwat; Krit Kasemsarn
- Starring: Kanokchat Munyad-on; Savitree Suttichanond; Sirichai Charoenkijtanakul; Rachphol Yamsaeng; Vorarit Fuangaromya; Nimit Lugsameepong
- Cinematography: Nat Yoswatananont; Suwandee Jakravoravudh
- Edited by: Nattapol Nak-ngen
- Music by: Ryan Shore
- Production companies: Exformat Films; Igloo Studio; Riff Animation Studio
- Distributed by: M Pictures
- Release dates: January 11, 2018; December 25, 2019 (Netflix)
- Running time: 102 minutes
- Country: Thailand
- Language: Thai
- Budget: ฿230 million
- Box office: ฿52.6 million ฿100 million (worldwide)

The Legend of Muay Thai: 9 Satra (Thai: ๙ ศาสตรา; RTGS: Kao Sattra; lit. '9 weapons') is a Thai animated action-fantasy film released in 2018. It was released on Netflix (Thailand) on December 25, 2019.

The film was named "Film of the Year" at the 2019 Nine Entertain Awards on June 25, 2019.

== Synopsis ==
A yaksha prince, Dehayaksa, has taken reign of the people of Ramthep Nakorn. However, when there is a prophecy that he is to be defeated by a warrior with a knowledge of Muay Thai and a weapon known as the 'Satravuth', he sets out to destroy all schools of Muay Thai and seeks to destroy the Satravuth, while imprisoning the royals of Ramthep Nakorn to prevent the prophecy from coming true.

A young boy named Ott and his stepfather are able to escape to the remote Nok-Aen Islands, where Ott trains in Muay Thai with the hopes of bringing the Satravuth back to Ramthep Nakorn and freeing its people. On his journey, he befriends a monkey prince named Vata, a red yaksha named Maratta, and a Chinese pirate named Xiaolan.

== Characters ==
- Ott, a young man trained in Muay Thai and a citizen of Ramthep Nakorn. He lives with his stepfather on the Nok-Aen Islands, training in Muay Thai with his mute teacher and practicing meditation with the local monk. He is tasked with bringing the Satravuth back to Ramthep Nakorn in order to free the city's people.
- Xiaolan, a female Chinese pirate and the captain of a flying ship. She is headed for Ramthep Nakorn in order to rescue her brother, who is among those imprisoned.
- Vata, a monkey prince whose kingdom has been invaded by yaksha armies. As a result, he is forced to flee and survives by picking pockets. He befriends the red yaksha Maratta.
- Maratta, a red yaksha who has been labeled as a traitor among his kind due to his romance with a human woman. As a result, he has been exiled. Maratta later befriends Vata.
- Dehayaksa, the oppressive yaksa ruler who has taken control of Ramthep Nakorn. When he is made aware of a prophecy that he will meet his demise at the hands of a warrior with a knowledge of Muay Thai and the Satravuth, he destroys all Muay Thai schools and searches for the weapon in order to destroy it as well. As a result of his actions, Muay Thai becomes a lost art form.

== Voice cast ==
- Kanokchat Munyad-on as Ott
- Savitree Suttichanond as Xiaolan
- Sirichai Charoenkijtanakul as Maratta
- Rachphol Yamsaeng as Vata
- Vorarit Fuangaromya as Dehayaksa

== Release ==
The Legend of Muay Thai: 9 Satra received its theatrical release in Thailand on January 11, 2018. It was released in China on June 29, 2018. The film was then given a worldwide release on July 20, 2018.

The film was later released on Netflix on December 25, 2019.

== Awards ==
- 2019 Thailand National Film Association Awards
  - Best Original Score (Ryan Shore)
  - Best Sound Mixing (Richard Hocks)
- 2019 Nine Entertainment Awards
  - Film of the Year
