= Arifen Hazanee =

Thai cartoonist

- Born: June 17, 1957 (age 69) Bangkok, Thailand
- Pseudonym: Fan Studio
- Notable works: A flower girl and Kluay Khai boy; Ramawatarn

Arifen Hazanee, or pen name “Fen Studio” (born on June 17, 1957), was a Thai cartoonist of Banlue Publication, which published Mahasanook, Sao Dokmai Ga Nai Gluaykai, Ram Avtar, and Mahabharata.

== Biography ==
Arifen was a Thai-Muslim man who was born on June 17, 1957, in Bangkok and raised in Yala province in Thailand. He graduated high school from Kanarasdornbumroong Yala School in Yala Province, and was graduated bachelor's degree from Pohchang Academy of Arts (Commercial design).

== Renowned work ==
The first cartoon he drew was made during his time at university. He was inspired to be a cartoonist and wanted to have his own salary for further education, so he started his career from drawing a three panel comedy cartoon. He offered his work to Udomsuksa Publication, and his original work was accepted while he received 15 Baht per page. Due to the recruitment of traditional Thai cartoon drawer, Arifen was persuaded to work as a supportive drawer to earn extra salary after class in the evening.

- In 1978, One Baht Cartoon was very popular in cartoon industry; he then started to draw it and offered his work to Sirisarn publication. Arifen received 500 Baht per one book which has 24 pages. Lately, he moved to work with Samdao publication, the original book price was gradually increased up to 1200 Baht per book. The story is mostly about life, traditional folktale, and more.
- In the middle of 1980, he realized that he wanted to work with the publication of his favorite cartoon “Noo-Ja” and “Baby” that he followed since he was young. He dreamt that he had a chance to work with his favorite cartoonist “Ar Joom Jim” and “Ar Wat”. He then sent his work to Banlue publication. His original work was received and published as a long story cartoon for youth. The cartoon name was Sawasdee Rongrian, and he quit drawing one Baht cartoon since then.
- In 1981, Banlue group had published another more cartoon named Cartoon Lai Rod written by the great cartoonist Triam Chachumporn and Ohm Ratchawet. Many new cartoonists also had a chance to draw this cartoon. Arifen was assigned to draw Miti Cheevit, which was a short-ended story inside the cartoon.
- In 1982, after he graduated from Poh Chang Academy of Arts, he took a chance to be a lecturer in Kasetsart University Demonstration School. He taught arts and craft to the primary student for three years while sending his cartoon work to the publication.
- Until 1986, his friend invited him to work with a small advertising company for two years and still sending his work to the publication. On that time, editor Withit assigned him to write a picture novel on Baby, Kai Hua Roh, and Mahasanook. There was a little bit change of the work; his way of drawing was changed from a big novel picture to a comedy cartoon work with simple drawing. His new cartoon was named Por Mae Look which was very famous toward Mahasanook reader.
- In 1987, his friend invited him to design the cloths for GQ Group for three years, but he still spent time after his work to draw a cartoon. At the same time, he wrote a comedy cartoon Ba Krob Sood in Mahasanook and also drew a long story name Singha Siam.
- In the middle of 1990, he resigned from his work to be a professional cartoonist for Banlue Group. He also had more time to write a cartoon in Mahasanook Pocket Book including Sao Dokmai Ga Nai Gluaykai, etc.
- Until 1994, the editor Vithit Utsahajit saw that Sao Dokmai Ga Nai Gluaykai that was in the Mahasanook comic had a lot of fanclubs, so he published the new monthly book for that story.

== Achievements ==
- 1980 – Sawasdee Rongrian
- 1981 – Miticheevit
- 1982 – Aphiniharn Toktak
- 1988 – Thep Salatun
- 1986 – Pak Tai Ban Rao
- 1989-1992 Bah Krob Sood
- 1990 – Singha Siam
- 1995-1996 – Gong Jom Thep Bah Krob Sood
- 1996-1997 – Gong 191
- 1987-1994 – Por Mae Look Family
- 1996-2001 – Pom Pom Gingka Thewada
- 1997-2005 – Pao Boon Jee
- 1994 – Present – Borisut Ud Pee
- 1995 – Super Corona
- 1991 – Present – Sao Dokmai Ga Nai Gluaykai
- 2005-2006 – Ruam Pon Kon Lakorn
- 2001-2005 – Ram Avtar
- 2004-2008 - Mahabharata
- 2007-2008 - Ramakian Mini Animation
- 2008–Present – Hong Samut Mahudsajun
- 2006-2007 – Mahosot
- 2008-2013 – Thep Apiniharn Tumnarn Greek
- 2013–Present – Kaew Nha Mar

== Work experience ==
- A lecturer at Kasetsart University Demonstration School for three years
- Work in advertising agency (creative) for two years
- Clothing designer at GQ Group for three years
