= PangPond =

- Written by: Pakdee Saentaweesuk
- Country of origin: Thailand
- Original language: Thai

Production
- Producer: Ratchapon Jitpungdham(Thai: รัชพล จิตพึงธรรม)
- Production company: Banlue Group

Original release
- Network: Channel 3 (Thailand)

PangPond (Thai: ปังปอนด์; RTGS: Pangpon) is a Thai cartoon character created by Pakdee Saentaweesuk. He is a five-year-old boy with large round eyes and three strands of hair on his head. He is an ordinary boy with an active imagination and a hyperactive personality. His curiosity often gets him into trouble, but he always finds a way out.

PangPond first appeared in Cartoon Mahasanook, a well-known Thai comic book with a circulation of more than 350,000 copies per week. The character is currently published in his own comic book.

Since 2002, Banlue Group (Banluesarn's head office) has broadcast 3D animated comics featuring PangPond in IMAX and on Channel 3 (Thailand).

== PangPond Animation ==
PangPond the Series was first created and shown in 3d animation in 2002 by Banlue Group on Channel 3 (Thailand) on April 3, 2002. After that, PangPond The Movie was released in IMAX Theaters on the 10th anniversary of PangPond: The Series. This was the first Thai movie created in 3D animation. In March 2008, PangPond was appointed to be a Global Warming Ambassador by the Thai Ministry of Natural Resources and Environment which was a campaign to help inform children and youth about global warming. In September 2008, Net Leader Company distribute the character PangPond to show Thailand's animation Asia Pacific.
